= Beaver Lake =

Beaver Lake may refer to:

== Lakes ==
=== Antarctica ===
- Beaver Lake (Antarctica)

=== Canada ===
- Beaver Lake (Alberta)
- Beaver Lake (Vancouver), British Columbia
- Beaver Lake (Victoria, British Columbia)
- Beaver Lake (Montreal)
- Beaver Lakes (Annapolis), Nova Scotia
- Beaver Lake (Halifax), Nova Scotia, the name of several lakes
- Beaver Lake (Inverness), Nova Scotia
- Beaver Lake (Pictou), Nova Scotia
- Beaver Lake (Queens), Nova Scotia
- Beaver Lake (Shelburne), Nova Scotia
- Beaver Lake (Victoria, Nova Scotia)
- Beaver Lake (Yarmouth), Nova Scotia
- Beaver Lake (Saskatchewan)

=== United States ===
- Beaver Lake (Alaska), site of Beaver Lake Dam
- Beaver Lake (Arkansas)
- Beaver Lake (Newton County, Indiana), now drained
- Beaver Lake (Dexter, Iowa)
- Beaver Lake (Kentucky)
- Beaver Lake, Steele County, Minnesota
- Beaver Lake (Montana), a lake in Missoula County
- Beaver Lake (Nevada)
- Beaver Lake (Hamilton County, New York)
- Beaver Lake (New York), in Lewis County
- Beaver Lake State Park (North Dakota)
- Beaver Lake (Minnehaha County, South Dakota)
- Beaver Lake (Yankton County, South Dakota)
- Beaver Lake (Texas)
- Beaver Lake (Clallam County, Washington), on Washington State Route 113
- Beaver Lake (King County, Washington)

== Places ==
=== Canada ===
- Beaver Lake 131, Alberta
  - Beaver Lake Cree Nation, a First Nations band government
- Beaver Lake, Alberta
- Beaver Lake, Ontario, a community within the city of Greater Sudbury
- Beaver Lake 17, Nova Scotia, a Mi'kmaq reserve

=== United States ===
- Beaver Lake, Michigan, Klacking Township
- Beaver Lake Middle School, in Issaquah School District, Washington
- Beaver Lake Nature Center, Baldwinsville, Onondaga County, New York
- Beaver Lake Park (Washington), a park in Sammamish

== See also ==
- Beaver Dam (disambiguation)
- Beaver Lake Mountains, in Utah, U.S.
- Beaver Lake point, a projectile point of the Paleoindian period
- Beaver Lake Seaplane Base, Alaska, U.S.
- Beaver Lake (1938 HBC vessel), see Boats of the Mackenzie River watershed
- Beaver Woman Lake, in Glacier National Park, Montana, U.S.
