= Flat Lake =

Flat Lake is the name of various lakes and places:

- Flat Lake (Nova Scotia) (section Lakes)
- Flat Lake (British Columbia) in Flat Lake Provincial Park, British Columbia, Canada
- Flat Lake (South Dakota)
- Riggs Flat Lake
- Scotts Flat Reservoir (redirect from Scotts Flat Lake)
- Pine Flat Lake, Nevada

== Places ==
- Flat Lake, Alberta

== Other ==
- Flat Lake Festival
