= List of lakes of Nova Scotia =

This is a list of lakes in Nova Scotia.

== Cape Breton Island ==
=== All Four Counties ===
- Bras d'Or Lake 45°51′37″N 60°46′44″W

=== Cape Breton Regional Municipality ===
- Anse aux Cannes Pond 45°57′41″N 59°48′29″W
- The Barachois 45°55′0″N 59°58′41″W
- Bear Cove Pond 45°48′34″N 60°4′55″W
- Bear Gulch Ponds 45°57′46″N 59°50′39″W
- Beaverdam Pond 46°5′24″N 59°56′22″W
- Belle Lake 45°57′7″N 60°6′16″W
- Bennetts Pond 45°57′8″N 59°49′24″W
- Big Pond 45°56′46″N 59°52′19″W
- Blacketts Lake 46°4′7″N 60°18′28″W
- Bluff Lake 45°47′42″N 60°6′8″W
- Boom Pond 45°59′49″N 59°51′11″W
- Boutellier Lake 46°5′23″N 60°6′59″W
- Bray Lake 46°6′13″N 60°7′35″W
- Buscombe Lake 46°6′13″N 60°7′35″W
- Campbells Pond 45°59′27″N 59°50′47″W
- Canoe Lake 45°52′17″N 60°13′39″W
- Catalone Lake 46°0′2″N 59°57′4″W
- Cavanaghs Lake 45°54′59″N 60°2′22″W
- Cochran Lake 46°5′57″N 59°59′35″W
- Copper Lake 45°54′19″N 60°12′38″W
- Cranberry Pond 46°3′9″N 60°9′47″W
- Cusack Lake 46°6′37″N 60°5′13″W
- Danny MacDonalds Lake 45°58′27″N 60°4′44″W
- Deadman Lake 46°4′25″N 60°9′46″W
- Dixon Lake 45°57′15″N 60°7′36″W
- Dixons Lake 45°55′54″N 59°58′24″W
- Ducker Lake 46°2′28″N 60°8′13″W
- Dumaresq Lake 46°4′27″N 60°8′18″W
- Ferguson Lake 45°58′18″N 60°4′31″W
- Fiddlers Lake 45°53′42″N 60°12′23″W
- Fieldings Lake 45°59′29″N 60°2′15″W
- First Dodds Lake 46°8′25″N 60°2′47″W
- French Village Lake 45°55′8″N 60°15′50″W
- Gabarus Lake 45°48′44″N 60°12′32″W
- Goose Lake 45°45′0″N 60°17′54″W
- Grants Hill Lake 45°48′30″N 60°8′41″W
- Grants Old Lake 45°49′24″N 60°9′12″W
- Gull Lake 46°0′30″N 59°49′42″W
- Hardys Lake 45°48′24″N 60°6′51″W
- Little Ferguson Lake 45°57′8″N 60°6′51″W
- Little MacLeod Lake 45°57′27″N 60°6′20″W
- Lower MacLeod Lake 45°57′21″N 60°7′52″W
- MacInnis Lake 45°57′28″N 60°8′53″W
- MacIntyre Lake 45°58′20″N 60°5′43″W
- MacIsaacs Lake 45°58′18″N 60°7′48″W
- MacLeod Lake 45°56′50″N 60°8′9″W
- MacMullin Lake 45°57′40″N 60°6′37″W
- MacPherson Lake 45°57′32″N 60°5′33″W
- Marsh Lake 46°6′0″N 60°6′54″W
- Shibinette Lakes 45°58′48″N 60°7′8″W
- Slatterys Lake 45°50′11″N 60°9′26″W
- Stewarts Lake 45°56′24″N 60°1′14″W
- Sugar Loaf Lakes 45°48′12″N 60°5′38″W
- Tank Pond 46°1′51″N 59°58′16″W
- Taylors Ponds 45°57′45″N 60°3′7″W
- The Three Ponds 45°57′5″N 59°54′38″W
- Three Stone Lake 45°52′36″N 60°12′29″W
- Twelve Mile Lake 45°54′3″N 60°7′52″W
- Upper Barachois Lake 45°50′25″N 60°8′37″W
- Willis Lake 45°52′26″N 60°12′42″W
- Winging Point Lake 45°47′13″N 60°7′2″W

=== Inverness County ===
- Lake Ainslie 46°7′59″N 61°10′59″W
- Beaver Lake 45°46′45″N 61°10′31″W
- Ballams Pond 45°41′45″N 61°6′19″W
- Beaver Dam Lake 45°38′18″N 61°17′3″W
- Black Charlies Lake 45°50′39″N 61°2′24″W
- Black Lakes 45°47′29″N 61°7′17″W
- Brileys Lake 45°45′11″N 61°24′10″W
- Company Lake 45°50′0″N 61°3′1″W
- Little Beaver Lakes 45°50′44″N 61°1′13″W
- Livingstones Lakes 45°51′45″N 61°6′0″W
- MacArthurs Lake 45°45′49″N 61°14′47″W
- MacAskills Lake 45°50′9″N 61°2′39″W
- MacDonalds Lake 45°50′14″N 61°2′14″W
- MacGregors Lake 45°41′44″N 61°18′52″W
- MacIntyre Lake 45°39′12″N 61°16′49″W
- MacRaes Lakes 45°49′12″N 61°4′34″W

=== Richmond County ===
- Buchanan Lake 45°38′49″N 61°6′9″W
- Donnellys Lake 45°43′58″N 60°58′17″W
- First Lake 45°38′20″N 61°1′0″W
- Hill Lake 45°42′0″N 60°59′46″W
- Lauchlin Lake 45°39′6″N 61°7′39″W
- Loch Lomond 45°44′46.9″N 60°35′22.9″W
- MacMillan Lakes 45°37′59″N 61°9′50″W
- McCarthys Lake 45°37′44″N 61°10′7″W
- McDonald Lake 45°43′13″N 60°57′48″W
- Middle Lake 45°37′52″N 61°9′33″W
- Willis Lake 45°52′25.9″N 60°12′42″W

=== Victoria County ===
- Artemise Lake 46°37′12″N 60°40′7″W
- Beaver Lake 46°43′6″N 60°30′37″W
- Big Lake 46°24′56″N 60°37′48″W
- Black Lake 46.876389°N 60.559722°W
- Boot Lake 46°33′9″N 60°28′38″W
- Boyd Lake 46°40′51″N 60°29′6″W
- Breton Cove Pond 46°27′33″N 60°27′22″W
- Camerons Lakes 46°40′55″N 60°26′45″W
- Canns Lake 46°40′21″N 60°25′55″W
- Caribou Lakes 46°37′17″N 60°36′12″W
- Chéticamp Flowage 46°39′5″N 60°38′16″W
- Clyburn Lake 46°39′58″N 60°34′46″W
- Dauphiney Lake 46°41′57″N 60°31′58″W
- Dundas Lakes 46°42′39″N 60°32′24″W
- Fenton Lake 46°40′24″N 60°35′50″W
- Flint Lake 46°39′5″N 60°36′3″W
- French River Lakes 46°30′52″N 60°32′43″W
- Freshwater Lake 46°38′43″N 60°23′48″W
- Gisborne Flowage 46°33′46″N 60°33′28″W
- McMillan Flowage 46°31′14″N 60°39′2″W
- South Lake 46°32′31″N 60°30′0″W
- Three Mile Lake 46°50′11″N 60°29′56″W
- Two Island Lake 46°39′32″N 60°35′11″W
- Wreck Cove Flowage 46°33′29″N 60°30′29″W

== Halifax Regional Municipality ==
- A Lake 44°49′26.9″N 63°38′2.9″W
- Acadia Lake 44°50′21″N 62°52′12″W
- Albro Lake 44°41′19.9″N 63°34′35.9″W
- Lake Alma, Nova Scotia 44°57′2″N 62°44′10″W
- Anderson Lake- Bedford 44°43′35.9″N 63°37′10.9″W
- Anderson Lake -Hammond Plains 44°44′2.5″N 63°51′51.8″W
- Ash Lake 44°54′2.9″N 63°38′46.9″W
- Ash Lake 44°44′4.9″N 63°51′44″W
- Ash Lake 44°40′45.9″N 63°42′52.9″W
- Ash Lake 44°40′5.9″N 63°51′8.9″W
- Ash Hill Lake 44°56′0″N 63°0′55″W
- Back Rocky Lake 44°50′35″N 62°47′21″W
- Lake Banook 44°40′51.2″N 63°33′24.9″W
- Baptizing Lake 44°43′26.9″N 63°46′1.9″W
- Bare Rock Lake 44°48′2″N 62°47′3″W
- Barrett Lake 44°48′51.9″N 63°41′13.9″W
- Bayers Lake 44°38′31.9″N 63°40′13.9″W
- Bear Lake 44°51′52″N 62°51′28″W
- Beaverbank Lake 44°51′24.9″N 63°40′3.9″W
- Beckwith Lake 44°49′21″N 63°28′38″W
- Beckwood Lake 44°51′4″N 63°27′21″W
- Bell Lake 44°40′29.3″N 63°30′34.1″W
- Bell Lake 44°52′19″N 63°28′32″W
- Big Horseshoe Lake 44°39′54.9″N 63°43′18.9″W
- Big Ass Lake 44°30′00″N 63°20′00″W
- Birch Lake 44°48′38″N 63°30′50″W
- Birch Cove Lake 44°40′5.9″N 63°41′46.1″W
- Bissett Lake 44°39′20.9″N 63°28′15.4″W
- Black Lake - 1 of 5 total 44°42′37″N 63°35′33″W
- Black Lake - 2 of 5 44.7103°N 63.5927°W
- Black Lake - 3 of 5 44°31′00″N 63°39′00″W
- Black Lake - 4 of 5 45.016389°N 62.4691666°W
- Black Lake - 5 of 5 44.799167°N 63.5458333°W
- Blakeney Lake 44°50′4.1″N 62°53′46.8″W
- Blueberry Lake 44°37′18.9″N 63°41′43.9″W
- Boot Lake 44°51′7″N 62°52′1″W
- Bottle Lake 44°43′18.9″N 63°25′16.9″W
- Brandy Lake 44°48′27″N 62°47′20″W
- Bug Lake 44°49′18″N 63°33′4″W
- Campbell Lake 44°41′50.9″N 63°48′49″W
- Camphill Lake 44°51′16.9″N 63°29′37.9″W
- Caribou Lake 44°49′37″N 62°52′18″W
- Carter Lake 44°44′56″N 63°25′9″W
- Catcha Lake 44°44′09″N 63°11′40″W
- Crotched Lake 44°52′14.9″N 63°39′41″W
- Lake Charles 44°43′11.5″N 63°32′59.9″W
- Lake Charlotte 44°46′03″N 62°57′05″W
- Chapman Lake 44°49′15″N 63°31′44″W
- Chezzetcook Lake 44°46′41″N 63°13′49″W
- Chocolate Lake- Armdale 44°38′19.1″N 63°37′21.1″W
- Chocolate Lake -Moser River 44°58′55.3″N 62°19′30.7″W
- Colpitt Lake 44°36′35.9″N 63°35′52″W
- Cow Bay Lake 44°36′54″N 63°26′42″W
- Cox Lake 45°14′34″N 62°45′4″W
- Coxs Lake 44°42′53.9″N 63°48′50.9″W
- Dark Lake- Enfield 44°52′34.9″N 63°33′15.9″W
- Dark Lake -Devon 44°52′25.4″N 63°22′33.2″W
- De Said Lake 44°38′3″N 63°28′59″W
- Doctors Lake

44°49′48″N 62°45′38″W

- Dollar Lake, Nova Scotia 44°55′0″N 63°19′26″W
- East Little Paul Lake 44°51′44″N 62°47′37″W
- Lake Echo 44°43′9″N 63°23′5″W
- Egg Lake 44°49′50″N 63°30′44″W
- Enchanted Lake 44°43′8″N 63°35′33″W
- Feely Lake 44°47′59.9″N 63°41′48.9″W
- Fenerty Lake 44°49′50.9″N 63°43′8.9″W
- Lake Fletcher 44°50′49.9″N 63°36′40.9″W
- First Chain Lake 44°38′18″N 63°38′46″W
- Fox Lake 44°50′56.9″N 63°19′42.9″W
- Fox Lake 44°48′24.7″N 63°30′12.9″W
- Fox Lake 44°40′45.8″N 63°42′18.9″W
- Frenchman Lake 44°41′55.6″N 63°34′35.5″W
- Frog Lake 44°37′34.5″N 63°36′13.5″W
- Frog Lake 44°43′7.9″N 63°24′38.9″W
- Frying Pan Hole 44°49′16″N 63°30′48″W
- Gold Lake 44°55′7″N 62°56′51″W
- Golden Lake 44°52′44.9″N 63°38′29″W
- Governor Lake 45°12′47.9″N 62°39′55.9″W
- Governor Lake Lakeside 44°38′31.9″N 63°42′0″W
- Green Lake 44°51′31″N 62°49′49″W
- Goose Lakes
- Halfway Lake 44°44′42.9″N 63°47′3.9″W
- Hamilton Lake 45°11′36″N 62°51′34″W
- Hamilton Lake 44°51′47″N 62°36′35″W
- Hamilton Lake 44°50′24″N 63°42′22″W
- Hatchet Lake 44°34′8″N 63°43′30″W
- Haunted Lake 44°53′11″N 63°39′2″W
- Hawkin Hall Lake 44°52′29″N 63°43′22″W
- Henry Lake 44°34′7″N 63°37′42″W
- Hobsons Lake 44°41′33″N 63°42′42″W
- Hill Lake 45°14′8″N 62°41′26″W
- Holland Marsh Lake 44.6695°N 63.8189°W
- Holman Marsh Lake 44.5684°N 63.7761°W
- Hurley Lake 44°51′35″N 62°49′29″W
- Jack Lake 44°44′16″N 63°40′43″W
- Kearney Lake 44°41′44″N 63°41′51″W
- Kelly Lake 45°3′6″N 62°19′40″W
- Kelly Lake 44°52′24″N 63°35′7″W
- Kelly Long Lake 44°52′15″N 63°34′2″W
- Kidston Lake 44°35′45″N 63°37′12″W
- King Lake 44°50′59″N 63°31′8″W
- Kinsac Lake 44°49′40″N 63°39′15″W
- Lemont Lake 44°41′21″N 63°31′15″W
- Liscomb Lake Chain 45°14′33.5″N 62°27′40.2″W
- Little Albro Lake 44°41′3″N 63°34′35″W
- Little Cranberry Lake 44°39′33″N 63°42′49″W
- Little Cranberry Lake 44°32′24″N 63°40′36″W
- Little Cranberry Lake 44°50′12″N 62°41′41″W
- Little Pockwock Lake 44°46′10″N 63°51′35″W
- Little Red Trout Lake 44°48′51″N 63°32′37″W
- Lizard Lake near Hammonds Plains 44°45′39″N 63°50′37″W
- Lizard Lake on the Chebucto Peninsula 44°32′38″N 63°40′0″W
- Lizard Lake in Wellington at 44°53′46″N 63°38′15″W
- Lizard Lake in Fletchers Lake 44°50′7″N 63°37′13″W
- Lizard Lake in Timberlea 44°39′54″N 63°47′30″W
- Lovett Lake 44°38′16″N 63°40′59″W
- Lookout Lake 44°48′26″N 63°30′30″W
- Lower Beaver Lake 45°1′7″N 62°45′58″W
- Lower Marsh Lake 44°38′0″N 63°45′55″W
- Major Lake 44°44′38″N 63°29′47″W
- Maple Lake 44°41′18″N 63°47′8″W
- Marsh Lake 44°45′0″N 63°41′55″W
- Marsh Lake 44°39′54.2″N 64°03′32.8″W
- Martin Lake 44°41′31″N 63°34′22″W
- Maynard Lake 44°40′16.8″N 63°33′11.8″W
- McCabe Lake 44°46′33″N 63°45′4″W
- Lake Mic Mac 44°41′35.4″N 63°33′12.1″W
- Middle Beaver Lake45°0′32″N 62°45′51″W
- Miller Lake in Fall River 44°48′52″N 63°35′35″W
- Miller Lake 44°58′24″N 62°50′10″W
- Moon Lake 44°46′1″N 63°32′50″W
- Morris Lake 44°38′58″N 63°29′40″W
- Mountain Lake 44°44′7″N 63°30′44″W
- Murphys Black Duck Lake 44°49′36″N 62°47′42″W
- Niagara Lake 44°50′25″N 62°48′28″W
- Nelson Lake 44°43′24″N 63°25′38″W
- Newcombe Lake 44°48′32″N 62°48′6″W
- Oak Lake 44°47′51″N 63°1′55″W
- Oak Lake 44°54′0″N 63°38′34″W
- Oak Hill Lake 44°53′29″N 62°41′8″W
- Oak Hill Lake 44°35′0″N 63°52′4″W
- Oak Hill Lake 44°53′28″N 62°33′48″W
- Oat Hill Lake 44°40′26″N 63°32′59″W
- Obrien Lake 44°52′6″N 62°46′24″W
- Obrien Lake 44°51′52″N 63°28′39″W
- Porters Lake 44°42′5″N 63°17′23″W
- Porcupine Lake
- Quarry Lake Halifax 44°40′16″N 63°41′29″W
- Quarry Lake Chebucto Peninsula 44°29′10″N 63°42′53″W
- Queen Lake 44°51′1″N 63°30′55″W
- Paces Lake 44°48′57″N 63°12′49″W
- Paul Lake (Nova Scotia) 44°51′42″N 62°48′6″W
- Perry Lake 44°47′46″N 63°37′15″W
- Petpeswick Lake 44°45′33″N 63°11′10″W
- Phillips Boot Lake 44°49′40″N 62°48′51″W
- Pockwock Lake 44°47′57″N 63°50′15″W
- Powder Mill Lake 44°46′29″N 63°36′38″W
- Rabbit Lake 44°51′33″N 62°51′36″W
- Ragged Lake 44°29′55″N 63°39′39″W
- Ragged Lake 44°41′55″N 63°43′44″W
- Ragged Lake 44°37′27″N 63°40′30″W
- Rasley Lake 44°51′24″N 63°41′51″W
- Red Bridge Pond 44°41′26″N 63°32′36″W
- Scots Lake 44°47′29″N 63°10′50″W
- Scraggy Lake 44°57′2″N 62°53′11″W
- Second Chain Lake 44°38′10″N 63°39′8″W
- Seal Cove Lake 44°49′12″N 62°51′7″W
- Seloam Lake 45°10′00″N 62°30′25″W
- Seventeen Mile Lake 45°11′7″N 62°32′44″W
- Settle Lake 44°40′44.9″N 63°30′15.9″W
- Schmidt Lake 44°43′13″N 63°45′27″W
- Sheehan Lake 44°30′3″N 63°37′47″W
- Shingle Lake 44°49′8″N 62°46′20″W
- Shubenacadie Grand Lake 44°55′5.7″N 63°35′40″W
- Six Mile Lake 44°39′5″N 63°42′43″W
- Soldier Lake 44°48′57″N 63°34′11″W
- South Lake 45°14′19″N 62°42′23″W
- Spectacle Lake
- Springfield Lake 44°48′44″N 63°44′18″W
- Square Lake
- Squirrel Lake 44°50′54″N 62°51′11″W
- Sullivan Lake 44°52′55″N 63°34′33″W
- Sullivans Pond 44°40′22″N 63°33′47″W
- Tangier Grand Lake 44°53′29″N 62°50′28″W
- Tangier Island Pond 44°45′40″N 62°39′35″W
- Tangier Lake 44°49′56″N 62°43′57″W
- Taylor Lake 44°44′46″N 63°49′27″W
- Ten Mile Lake 45°8′36″N 62°42′11″W
- Three Mile Lake 44°46′54″N 63°37′31″W
- Three Mile Lake 44°49′3″N 63°30′18″W
- Timber Lake 44°49′33″N 62°45′26″W
- Thomas Lake 44°48′7″N 63°36′29″W
- Third Lake
- Three Finger Lake 44°40′7″N 63°43′12″W
- Tomahawk Lake 44°46′45″N 63°48′13″W
- Topsail Lake 44°41′39″N 63°31′0″W
- Trout Lake 44°49′31″N 62°50′15″W
- Tucker Lake 44°50′28″N 63°41′10″W
- Turf Lake 44°53′48″N 63°28′56″W
- Twin Lakes 44°50′11″N 62°48′21″W
- Upper Beaver Lake 45°0′3″N 62°45′36″W
- Upper Holman Marsh Lake 44°34′50.9″N 63°46′11.5″W
- Upper Marsh Lake 44°38′0″N 63°45′55″W
- Wallace Lake Sable Island 43°55′50.6″N 59°59′9.2″W
- Washmill Lake 44°40′47″N 63°41′5″W
- Webber Lake 44°46′30″N 63°43′35″W
- Webber Lake 44°49′49″N 63°0′18″W
- Weeks Lake 44°48′4″N 62°53′45″W
- West Little Paul Lake 44°51′37″N 62°48′17″W
- Williams Lake 44°37′11.9″N 63°35′43″W
- Williams Lake 44°48′50.9″N 63°26′57″W
- Williams Lake 44°43′2″N 63°3′1″W
- Willis Lake 44°47′38″N 63°35′27.5″W
- Wilson Lake 44°48′47″N 63°42′4″W

== Annapolis County ==
- Beaver Lakes 44°35′12″N 65°3′44″W
- Big Molly Upsim Lake44°37′12″N 65°6′36″W
- Carter Lake 44°43′51″N 65°5′28″W
- Dean Lake 44°26′50″N 65°3′39″W
- Folly Lake 44°43′47″N 64°50′53″W
- Frog Lake 44°33′1.9″N 65°12′57″W
- Hill Lake 44°30′36″N 65°34′30″W
- Kelly Lake 44°37′41″N 65°5′17″W
- Kejimikujik Lake 44°21′40.7″N 65°13′49.2″W
- Little Cranberry Lake 44°38′16″N 65°2′4″W
- Little Grand Lake 44°39′1.6″N 65°29′11.8″W
- Springfield Lake 44°38′9″N 64°51′29″W
- Thomas Lake 44°35′39″N 65°22′17″W

== Antigonish County ==
- Big Loch 45°47′33″N 61°58′50″W
- Greendale Loch 45°47′14″N 62°0′47″W
- Malignant Cove Pond 45°47′14″N 62°4′55″W
- Monks Head Pond 45°40′12″N 61°50′37″W
- North Lake 45°46′49″N 61°55′1″W
- Pomquet Lake 45°37′23″N 61°50′21″W
- South Lake 45°45′56″N 61°55′0″W
- Vincents Lake 45°42′41″N 62°9′19″W

== Colchester County ==
- Bear Lake
- Blakeney Lake 45°31′29.9″N 63°24′48.9″W
- Carter Lake 45°31′51″N 63°34′53″W
- Dean Lake 45°16′1″N 62°45′31″W
- Folly Lake (Colchester) 45°32′15″N 63°32′42″W
- Frog Lake 45°30′48.9″N 63°23′26.1″W
- Hattie Lake 45°17′2″N 62°44′0″W
- Nelson Lake 45°16′34″N 62°43′33″W
- Pictou Lake 45°16′31″N 62°45′1″W
- Slack Lake 45°30′42″N 63°33′8″W
- Stevens Lake 45°32′6″N 63°31′1″W

== Cumberland County ==
- Black Lake (Nova Scotia) 45.47139°N 64.27333°W
- Black Lake (Nova Scotia) 45.703422°N 63.929793°W
- Barber Lake 45°33′0″N 63°33′0″W
- Goose Lake 45°57′0″N 64°7′55″W
- Hart Lake 45°34′32″N 63°31′5″W
- Newville Lake 45°31′16″N 64°20′18″W
- Taylor Lake 45°31′18″N 64°42′4″W
- Williams Lake 45°46′16.9″N 63°40′7.9″W

== Digby County ==
=== Municipality of Clare ===
- Ash Lake 44°9′37.9″N 66°6′26.9″W
- Briar Lake 44°7′49.06″N 65°57′22.81″W
- Second Briar Lake 44°8′0″N 65°56′55″W

=== Municipality of the District of Digby ===
- Little Cranberry Lake 44°19′16″N 65°44′9″W
- Ninth Lake 44°26′43″N 65°33′40″W
- Obrien Lake 44°30′58″N 65°40′34″W
- Porters Lake 44°29′52″N 65°48′18″W

== Guysborough County ==
=== Municipality of the District of Guysborough ===
- Boggy Lake 45°6′1″N 62°18′49″W
- Greenwood Lake 45°18′8″N 61°27′36″W
- Goose Lake 45°11′0″N 61°23′54″W
- First Rocky Lake 45°14′22″N 62°32′16″W
- Frog Lake 45°17′25.9″N 61°54′31.9″W
- Goose Harbour Lake 45°33′0″N 61°24′54″W
- Hart Lake 45°24′33″N 61°34′32″W
- Hart Lake 45°26′18″N 61°27′54″W
- Hattie Lake 45°15′45″N 62°28′35″W
- Hattie Lake 45°21′47″N 62°1′31″W
- Hattie Lakes 45°18′52″N 62°17′29″W
- Kelly Lake 45°14′33″N 62°19′24″W
- King Lake 45°18′8″N 61°27′36″W
- Lake Charles 45°19′11.9″N 61°3′13.9″W
- Indian Harbour Lake 45°8′1.34″N 61°52′38.38″W
- Lower Rocky Lake 45°12′48″N 62°32′35″W
- Jordan Lake 45°11′56.9″N 62°25′2″W
- Hay Marsh Lake 45°21′0″N 61°12′54″W
- Miller Lake 45°2′26″N 62°9′12″W
- Miller Lake 45°1′0″N 62°8′57″W
- Morris Lake 45°4′30″N 62°18′31″W
- Second Cow Lake 45°16′38.3″N 61°16′11.9″W
- Stevens Lake 45°16′13″N 61°11′55″W
- Oak Hill Lake 45°14′1″N 61°38′20″W
- Oak Hill Lake 45°7′14″N 62°23′24″W
- Taylor Lake 45°22′50″N 62°0′0″W
- Second Rocky Lake 45°13′45″N 62°32′57″W
- Seloam Lake 45°10′00″N 62°30′25″W
- Seventeen Mile Lake 45°11′7″N 62°32′44″W
- Sherbrooke Lake 45°8′27.9″N 61°58′0.9″W
- Three Mile Lake 45°20′9″N 61°4′42″W
- Wallace Lake 45°18′55.9″N 62°3′21.9″W

=== Municipality of the District of Saint Mary's ===
- Ash Lake 45°7′16.9″N 62°12′46.9″W
- Lake Henry 45°18′20″N 62°17′14″W
- Long Marsh Lake 45°0′0″N 62°6′55″W
- Marsh Lake 44°59′0″N 62°5′54″W

== Hants County ==
=== Municipality of East Hants ===
- Little Grand Lake 44°57′43.9″N 63°34′30″W
- Nelson Lake 44°58′10″N 63°42′2″W
- Soldier Lake 44°54′5″N 63°52′49″W
- Wallace Lake 45°1′39.9″N 63°43′18.9″W

=== Municipality of the District of West Hants ===
- King Lake 44°54′22″N 63°58′44″W
- Lizard Lake 44°49′41.7″N 64°08′15.6″W
- Miller Lake 44°55′57″N 64°8′20″W
- Panuke Lake 44°47′33.9″N 64°6′46.9″W
- South Lake 44°46′22″N 64°1′59″W
- Taylor Lake 44°56′0″N 64°1′7″W

== Lunenburg County ==
=== Municipality of the District of Lunenburg ===
- Big Mushamush Lake 44°30′5.9″N 64°33′48″W
- Fox Lake 44°25′45.9″N 64°47′55″W
- Marsh Lake 44°17′0″N 64°32′55″W

=== Municipality of the District of Chester ===
- Anderson Lake 44°44′0.9″N 64°13′33.9″W
- Goose Lake 44°41′0″N 64°21′55″W
- Henry Lake 44°36′0″N 64°20′59″W
- Maple Lake 44°38′16″N 64°4′56″W
- Bear Marsh Lake 44°40′0″N 64°30′55″W
- Nine Mile Lake 44°41′54″N 64°17′55″W
- Second Bog Lake 44°42′0″N 64°11′55″W
- Sherbrooke Lake 44°39′27.9″N 64°36′8″W
- Yellow Marsh Lake 44°35′0″N 64°6′55″W

== Kings County ==
- Aylesford Lake 44.941°N 64.664°W
- Fox Lake 44°51′49″N 64°49′5″W
- Gaspereau Lake 44°59′N 64°32′W
- Hamilton Lake 44°49′45″N 64°45′54″W
- Lake George 44°55′26.9″N 64°41′21.9″W
- Tomahawk Lake 44°52′55″N 64°45′0″W

== Pictou County ==
- Beaver Lake 45°23′39″N 62°22′50″W
- Beaver Lake 45°21′6″N 62°30′1″W
- Black Lake 1 of 4 named 45°24′0″N 62°19′0″W,
- Black Lake 2 of 4 45.382778°N 62.6788888°W
- Black Lake 3 of 4 45.398333°N 62.3183333°W
- Black Lake 4 of 4 45.449167°N 62.4133333°W
- Dryden Lake 45°23′29″N 62°46′39″W
- Ellen Brown Lake 45°18′0″N 62°43′16″W
- Forbes Lake (Pictou County) 45.497201°N 62.637773°W
- Maple Lake 45°22′59″N 62°36′29″W
- Robertsons Lake 45°32′10″N 62°13′42″W
- Taylor Lake 45°21′46″N 62°26′0″W

== Region of Queens Municipality ==
- Beaver Lake 44°29′57″N 64°55′14″W
- Beaver Lake 44°15′35″N 65°14′23″W
- Black Lake 44.202835°N 64.983018°W
- Hog Lake 44°22′43.9″N 64°54′53″W
- Lake Rossignol 44°13′3.4″N 65°8′43.2″W
- McGowan Lake 44°25′46″N 65°03′13″W
- Robertsons Lake 43°52′51″N 64°53′43″W
- Second Beaverdam Lake 44°06′09.8″N 64°45′18.6″W
- Second Beaver Lake 44°12′37.8″N 65°19′19.3″W
- Second Christopher Lake 44°19′0″N 64°58′55″W
- Ten Mile Lake 44°10′7″N 64°50′36″W
- Tobeatic Lake 44°11′39.9″N 65°17′2.9″W
- Willis Lake 43°53′47″N 64°49′10.9″W

== Shelburne County ==
=== Municipality of Barrington ===
- Barrington Lake 43°36′44.9″N 65°34′24.9″W
- Beaver Lake 43°49′9″N 65°32′23″W
- Goose Lake 43°36′14″N 65°31′36″W
- Musquash Lake 43°40′34″N 65°33′58″W
- Oak Park Lake 43°36′15″N 65°39′43″W

=== Municipality of the District of Shelburne ===
- Greenwood Lake 43°35′53″N 65°25′39″W
- Jordan Lake 44°4′45.7″N 65°14′14.9″W
- Lily Pond 43°44′9.9″N 65°3′8.9″W
- Little Harbour Lake 43°42′30.1″N 65°3′14.2″W
- Long Beach Pond 43°44′2.9″N 65°0′41.9″W
- Little Lake 43°46′11.9″N 64°59′16″W
- Porterfield Lakes 43°46′37.6″N 65°2′19.5″W
- Sodom Lake 43°45′30.9″N 64°57′30.9″W
- Swims Iceponds 43°43′9.7″N 65°7′3.9″W
- Robs Lake 43°45′29″N 65°5′42″W
- Walls Lake 43°46′29″N 65°4′4″W
- Wallace Lake 44°6′9.9″N 65°21′49″W

== Yarmouth County ==
=== Municipalite Argyle Municipality ===
- East Goose Lake 43°45′0″N 65°48′56″W
- Gavels Lake 43°54′07.5″N 65°56′08.9″W
- Goose Lake (Argyle) 43°46′0″N 66°0′56″W
- Great Barren Lake 43°50′33.9″N 65°44′13.9″W
- Great Pubnico Lake 43°43′5.9″N 65°40′47″W
- Hog Lake 43°53′33.9″N 65°53′22″W
- Kings Lake 43°54′12.3″N 65°54′53.7″W
- Middle Lakes 43°39′4″N 65°37′31″W
- Second Bear Lake 44°6′0″N 65°37′55″W

=== Municipality of the District of Yarmouth ===
- Lake Annis 44°3′10.98″N 66°0′58.17″W
- Beaver Lake 43°59′55″N 66°8′33″W
- Doctors Lake 43°53′8″N 66°5′58″W
- Goose Lake 43°36′0″N 65°31′55″W
- Halfway Lake 43°59′56.9″N 65°51′25″W
- Lake Milo 43°51′40.4″N 66°6′43.4″W
- Raynards Lake 43°57′41.3″N 65°54′54.7″W
- Second Chub Lake 44°26′0″N 65°37′55″W
- Second Lake 43°52′14″N 66°6′33″W
- Lake Vaughan 43°54′29.9″N 65°57′46.0″W

== See also ==
- Beaver Lake
- Crooked Lake
- Cranberry Lake
- Duck Lake
- Flat Lake
- Fourth Lake
- Grand Lake
- Hatchet Lake
- Juniper Lake
- Lewis Lake
- Little Lake
- Long Lake
- Molega Lake
- Oak Lake
- Otter Lake
- River Lake
- Rocky Lake
- Russell Lake
- Sandy Lake
- Second Lake
- Spectacle Lake
- Third Lake
- Whites Lake
