= Brigadoon (disambiguation) =

Brigadoon is a 1947 musical by Alan Jay Lerner and Frederick Loewe, and its fictional setting.

Brigadoon may also refer to:

== Arts ==
- Brigadoon (1954 film), a 1954 American film based on the musical, directed by Vincente Minnelli
- Brigadoon (1966 film), an American television film based on the musical
- Brigadoon (album), by the Ancestors, 1994
- Brigadoon: Marin & Melan, a 2000–2001 Japanese anime series

== Places ==
- Brigadoon, Western Australia, a suburb of Perth, Australia
- Brigadoon Children's Camp, a non-profit recreational facility on Aylesford Lake, Nova Scotia, Canada
- Brigadoon Lodge, a trout-fishing lodge on the Soque River in Georgia, US
- Brigadoon, Lexington, a neighborhood in Lexington, Kentucky, US
- Brigadoon State Nature Preserve, Barren County, Kentucky, US

== See also ==
- Brig o' Doon, a Scottish landmark
- "Germelshausen", an 1860 story by Friedrich Gerstäcker that some believe inspired the 1947 play
- Brigadoon Highland Gathering, an annual festival in Bundanoon, New South Wales, Australia
