= First Lake =

First Lake may refer to:

- First Lake (New York), part of the Fulton Chain of Lakes
- First Lake (Bisby Lakes, New York)
- First Lake (Nova Scotia)
- First Lake (Richmond County, Nova Scotia)
- First Lake, first of four lakes in the Nanaimo Lakes chain
