= River Lake =

River Lake may refer to:

- River Lake (Winter Haven, Florida), a lake in the U.S.
- River Lake (Nova Scotia), several lakes in Canada
- Fluvial lake, a lake on a river

== See also ==
- Rural Municipality of Lake of the Rivers No. 72, Saskatchewan, Canada
- Lake River, a river in the U.S.
- River (disambiguation)
- Lake (disambiguation)
