= Big Molly Upsim Lake =

Lake in Nova Scotia, Canada

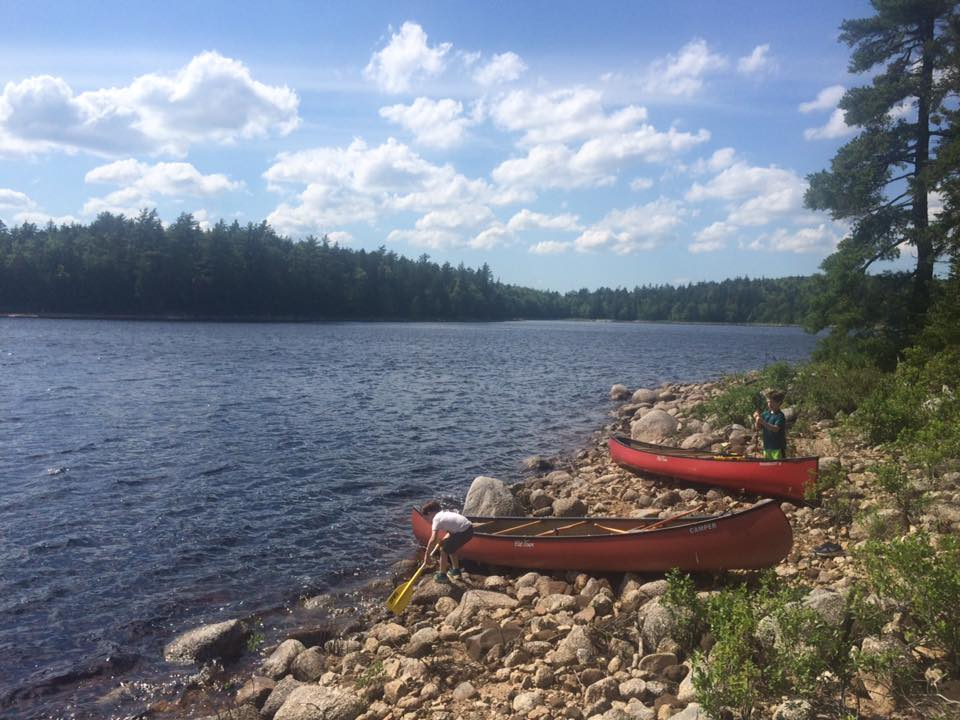
- Canoeing on Big Molly Upsim Lake and stopping on the northern Island.

- Location within Nova Scotia
- Location: Annapolis County, Nova Scotia
- Coordinates: 44.62°N 65.11°W
- Basin countries: Canada

Big Molly Upsim Lake is a lake in Canada. It is located in the province of Nova Scotia, in the southeastern part of the country, 800 km east of the capital Ottawa. Big Molly Upsim Lake is 186 meters above sea level. The area is 5.2 square kilometers. It stretches 5.8 kilometers in the north–south direction, and 3.5 kilometers in the east–west direction.

Water:

- Curl Hole (one water course)
- Kelly Brook (one waterway)
- Lake Fredericks Brook (one waterway)

Lakes:

- Fourth Molly Upsim Lakes (lakes)
- Kelly Lake (lake)
- Little Cranberry Lake (lake)
- Little Molly Upsim Lake (one lake)
- Little Pine Lake (one lake)
- Long Lake (one lake)
- Nineteen Mile Lake (one lake)
- North Lake (one lake)
- Pine Lake (lake)

In the surrounding area of Big Molly Upsim Lake, mainly forests grow.[4] The area around Big Molly Upsim Lake is almost unpopulated, with less than two inhabitants per square kilometer. The tract is part of the hemiboreal climate zone. The annual average temperature in the funnel is 5 °C. The warmest month is July, when the average temperature is 18 °C, and the coldest is January, by −12 °C. Average yearly average is 1,919 millimeters. The rainy month is December, with an average of 297 mm rainfall, and the driest is August, with 81 mm rainfall.
