= Tomahawk Lake =

Tomahawk Lake may refer to:

== Canada ==
- Tomahawk Lake (Halifax), in Nova Scotia
- Tomahawk Lake (Kings), in Nova Scotia

== United States ==
- Tomahawk Lake (New York)
- Tomahawk Lake (Wisconsin)
