= Webber Lake (Eastern Shore) =

Lake in Nova Scotia, Canada

- Location within Nova Scotia
- Location: Halifax Regional Municipality, Nova Scotia
- Coordinates: 44.8303°N 63.0048°W
- Basin countries: Canada
- Surface elevation: 80 m (260 ft)

Webber Lake is a lake of Halifax Regional Municipality, Nova Scotia, Canada.

== See also ==
- List of lakes in Nova Scotia
