= Little Lake =

Little Lake may refer to:

== Communities ==
=== Canada ===
- Little Lake, Ontario in Puslinch, Ontario
- Little Lake (Nova Scotia) in Nova Scotia

=== United States ===
- Little Lake, Inyo County, California
- Little Lake, California, former name of Willits, California
- Little Lake, Michigan in Forsyth Township
- Little Lake, Bedford Township, Michigan, a former settlement

== Lakes ==
=== Canada ===
- Little Lake (Barbara Township, Thunder Bay District), a lake in Barbara Township, Thunder Bay District, Ontario
- Little Lake (Bastard Township, Rideau Lakes), a lake in Bastard Township, Rideau Lakes, Ontario
- Little Lake (Benedickson Township, Algoma District), a lake in Benedickson Township, Algoma District, Ontario
- Little Lake (Blind River), a lake in Blind River, Ontario
- Little Lake (Bruce County), a lake in Bruce County, Ontario
- Little Lake (Frontenac County), a lake in Frontenac County, Ontario
- Little Lake (Simcoe County)
- Little Lake (Gravenhurst), a lake in Gravenhurst, Ontario
- Little Lake (Hanna Township, Cochrane District), a lake in Hanna Township, Cochrane District, Ontario
- Little Lake (Lahontan Township, Thunder Bay District), a lake in Lahontan Township, Thunder Bay District
- Little Lake (Lanark County), a lake in Lanark County, Ontario
- Little Lake (Little Township, Cochrane District), a lake in Cochrane District, Ontario
- Little Lake (Midland), a lake in Midland, Ontario
- Little Lake (Nipissing District), a lake in Nipissing District, Ontario
- Little Lake (Northumberland County), a lake in Northumberland County, Ontario
- Little Lake (Peterborough), in Peterborough, Ontario
- Little Lake (Renfrew County), a lake in Renfrew County, Ontario
- Little Lake (Sioux Lookout), a lake in Sioux Lookout, Ontario
- Little Lake (South Crosby Township, Rideau Lakes), a lake in South Crosby Township, Rideau Lakes, Ontario
- Little Lake (Springwater), a lake in Springwater, Ontario
- Little Lake (Wellington County), a lake in Wellington County, Ontario
- Little Lake (White River), a lake in White River, Ontario

=== United States ===
- Little Lake (Montana), in Missoula County, Montana
- Little Lake (Wisconsin), in the Town of Washington Island, Door County, Wisconsin

== Other ==
- Little Lake School District, California
