= Second Lake =

Second Lake may refer to:

- Second Lake (New York), part of the Fulton Chain of Lakes
- Second Lake (Bisby Lakes, New York)
- Second Lake, Nova Scotia
- Second Lake, second of four lakes in the Nanaimo Lakes chain
