= Maynard Lake (Nova Scotia) =

Lake in Nova Scotia, Canada

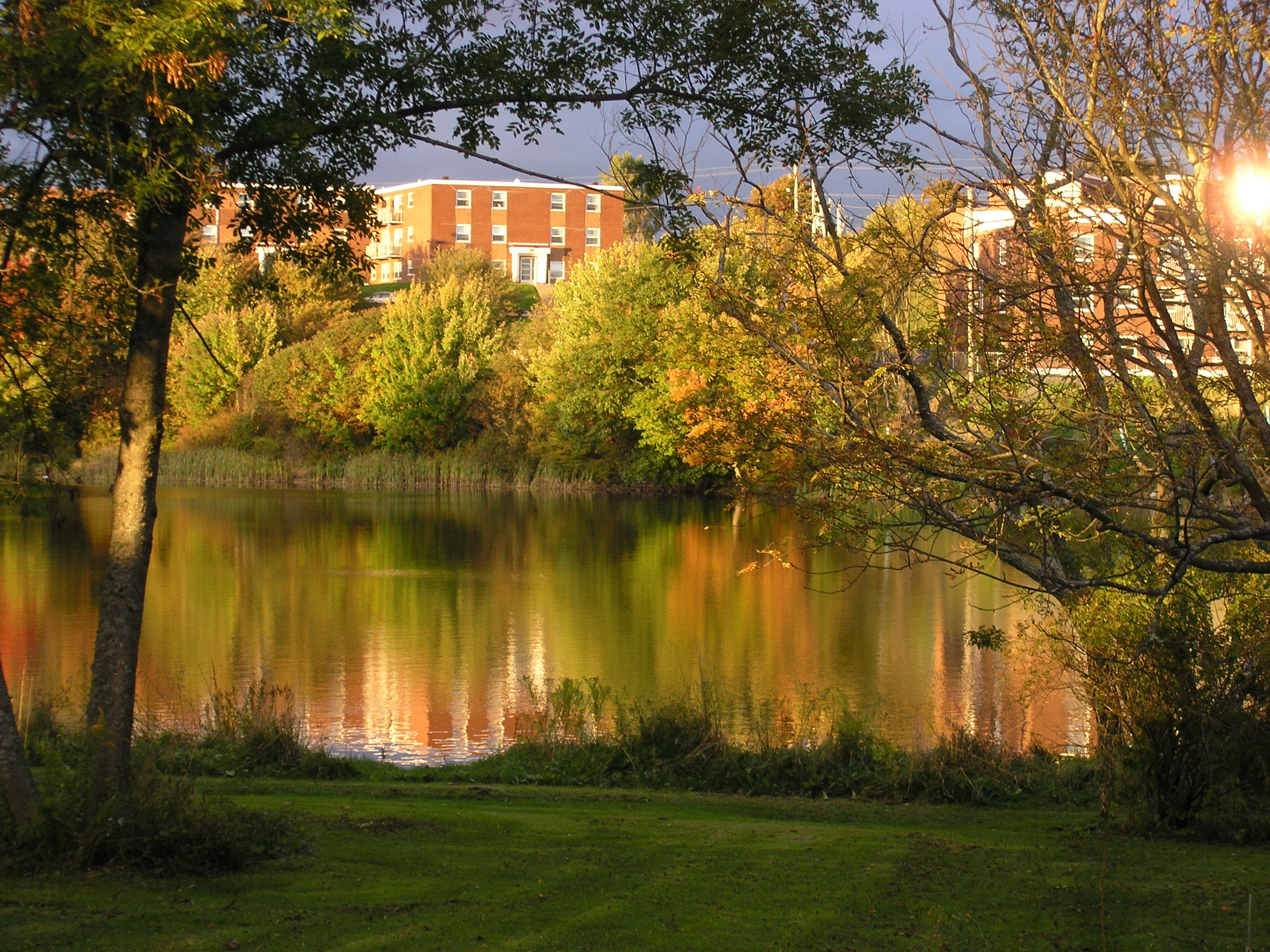
- Maynard Lake, Dartmouth, Nova Scotia in October 2007

- Location within Nova Scotia
- Location: Halifax Regional Municipality, Nova Scotia
- Coordinates: 44°40′16.8″N 63°33′11.8″W
- Basin countries: Canada
- Max. length: 811 m (2,661 ft)
- Max. width: 128 m (420 ft)
- Max. depth: 16 m (52 ft)

Maynard Lake, Nova Scotia is a lake of Halifax Regional Municipality, Nova Scotia, Canada located in Dartmouth.

== See also ==
- List of lakes in Nova Scotia
