= Sullivan Lake =

Sullivan Lake may refer to:

== Lakes ==
In Canada

- Alberta
  - Sullivan Lake (Alberta)
- Nova Scotia
  - Sullivan Lake (Halifax)
- Ontario
  - one of nine lakes with the name, including Sullivan Lake (Cochrane District), the source of the Misema River

In the United States

- Sullivan Lake (Idaho)

== Settlements ==
- Sullivan Lake, a community in the County of Paintearth No. 18, Alberta, Canada
