= Forbes Lake =

Forbes Lake may refer to one of the following:

- Forbes Lake (Saskatchewan)
- Forbes Lake in the Forbes Creek Watershed of Washington State
- Forbes Lake (Pictou County), Nova Scotia, Canada
