= Anderson Lake (Nova Scotia) =

Lake in Halifax, Nova Scotia, Canada

- Location within Nova Scotia
- Location: Halifax Regional Municipality, Nova Scotia
- Coordinates: 44°43′35.9″N 63°37′10.9″W
- Basin countries: Canada

Anderson Lake is a lake of Halifax Regional Municipality, Nova Scotia, Canada.

== See also ==
- List of lakes in Nova Scotia
