= Beaver Lake (Inverness) =

Lake in Inverness County, Nova Scotia, Canada

Beaver Lake Inverness
- Location within Nova Scotia
- Location: Inverness County, Nova Scotia
- Coordinates: 45°46′45″N 61°10′31″W
- Basin countries: Canada

Beaver Lake Inverness is a lake of Inverness County, in north-western Nova Scotia, Canada.

== See also ==
- List of lakes in Nova Scotia
