= Beaver Lake (Shelburne) =

Lake in Nova Scotia, Canada

Beaver Lake Shelburne
- Location within Nova Scotia
- Location: Barrington municipality, Nova Scotia
- Coordinates: 43.819081°N 65.539597°W
- Basin countries: Canada

Beaver Lake Shelburne is a lake of Municipality of the District of Barrington, in Nova Scotia, Canada.

== See also ==
- List of lakes in Nova Scotia
