= Porcupine Lake (Nova Scotia) =

Lake in Nova Scotia, Canada

Porcupine Lake, Nova Scotia
- Location within Nova Scotia
- Location: Aldersville, Lunenburg County, Nova Scotia
- Coordinates: 44.785457°N 63.419250°W
- Basin countries: Canada

Porcupine Lake is located near the community of Aldersville, Lunenburg County, Nova Scotia, Canada. The Porcupine Lake Wilderness Area protects this biologically productive region. It features mature stands of sugar maple, yellow birch, red spruce, and eastern hemlock, along with younger stands. The presence of old forest conditions, including deadwood, makes it a suitable habitat for the American marten, an endangered species in the province.

== See also ==
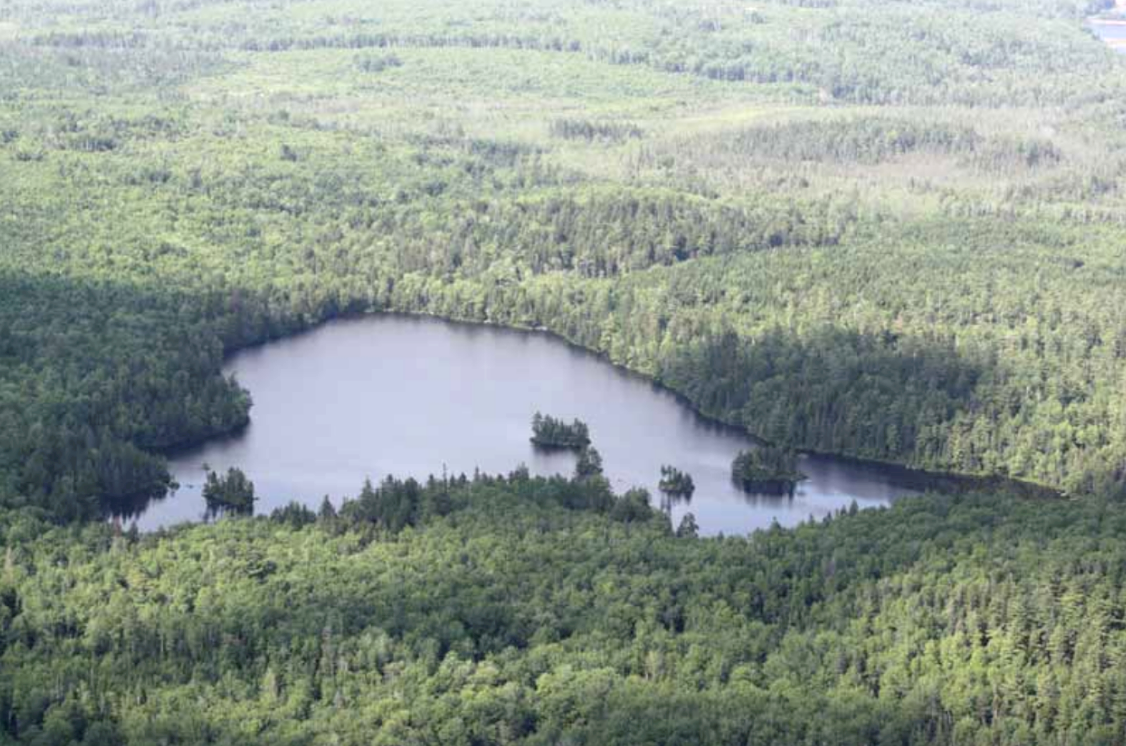
- Porcupine Lake, Lunenburg County, Nova Scotia, Canada
  List of lakes in Nova Scotia
