= Little Albro Lake =

Lake in Nova Scotia, Canada

- Location within Nova Scotia
- Location: Halifax Regional Municipality, Nova Scotia
- Coordinates: 44°41′3″N 63°34′35″W
- Basin countries: Canada

Little Albro Lake is a lake of Halifax Regional Municipality, Nova Scotia, Canada in the community of Dartmouth. Little Albro Lake has a plant named the yellow floating heart that is Invasive to the area.

== See also ==
- List of lakes in Nova Scotia
