= Weeks Lake =

Lake in Halifax County, Nova Scotia

- Interactive map of Weeks Lake
- Location: Halifax County
- Coordinates: 44°48′4″N 62°53′45″W
- Basin countries: Canada
- Max. length: 1,092.87 metres (3,585.5 ft)
- Max. width: 2,336 metres (7,664 ft)

Weeks Lake is a glacial lake in Halifax County, Nova Scotia, Canada. It is situated nearby village of Ship Harbour and a wilderness area named Tangier Grand Lake Wilderness Area. The lake's elevation is 4 metres (13 ft). The lake is approximately 58.66 kilometres (36.45 mi) from Halifax and 69.47 kilometres (43.17 mi) from Truro. The lake was described on December 12, 1939.

== Geography ==
Weeks Lake has 3 inlets and 1 outlets. It is measured 1,092.87 metres (3,585.5 ft) in length and 2,336 metres (7,664 ft) in width. The lake is connected to Second Lake by a small stream. It is also connected to the coast. Near lakes include Lake Charlotte, Little River Lake, Newcombe Lake, Northeast Lake, and Eisans Lake.

== Routes ==
Weeks Lake is situated near Nova Scotia Trunk 7 and Marine Drive, providing direct roadside visibility and access.

== See also ==
- List of lakes of Nova Scotia
- Tangier Grand Lake
- Eastern Shore, Nova Scotia
