= Willis Lake (Waverley) =

Lake in Halifax Regional Municipality, Nova Scotia, Canada

Willis Lake Waverley
- Location within Nova Scotia
- Location: Halifax Regional Municipality, Nova Scotia
- Coordinates: 44°47′38″N 63°35′29″W
- Basin countries: Canada

Willis Lake Waverley is a lake of Halifax Regional Municipality in Waverley, Nova Scotia, Canada.

== See also ==
- List of lakes in Nova Scotia
