= Seloam Lake =

Lake in Nova Scotia and Guysborough County

- Interactive map of Seloam Lake
- Location: Halifax County, Guysborough County
- Coordinates: 45.16691°N 62.50672°W
- Basin countries: Canada

Seloam lake is a lake that crosses Halifax County and Guysborough County. It is connected to Alex Lake by a small stream. It is approximately 97 kilometres (60 mi) from Halifax, and 66 kilometres (41 mi) from Truro. The lake was officially named on December 12, 1939. The lake is adjacent to Nova Scotia Route 374.

== Geography ==
Seloam lake is measured approximately 2,431 metres (7,976 ft) in length, and 1,844.63 metres (6,051.9 ft) in width. Near the lake, there is North Lake, Round Lake, Seventeen Mile Lake, and Moser Lake.

== See also ==
- List of lakes of Nova Scotia
- Seventeen Mile Lake
- Marshall Flowage
