= Little Cranberry Lake (Annapolis) =

Lake in Nova Scotia, Canada

Little Cranberry Lake, Annapolis
- Location within Nova Scotia
- Location: Annapolis County, Nova Scotia
- Coordinates: 44°38′16″N 65°2′4″W
- Basin countries: Canada

Little Cranberry Lake, Annapolis is a lake of Annapolis County, Nova Scotia, Canada.

== See also ==
- List of lakes in Nova Scotia
