= Rocky Lake Chain =

Lake chain in Nova Scotia

- Interactive map of Rocky Lake Chain
- Location: Guysborough County, Nova Scotia, Canada
- Coordinates: 45°13′34.7″N 62°33′03.3″W
- Type: Glacial lake chain
- Primary inflows: Multiple inlets
- Primary outflows: Multiple outlets
- Basin countries: Canada
- Settlements: Caledonia, Trafalgar

Rocky Lake Chain is a glacial lake chain located in Guysborough County, Nova Scotia, Canada, adjacent to the communities of Caledonia and Trafalgar, and near the Rush Lake Nature Reserve. The chain consists of First Rocky Lake, Second Rocky Lake, and Lower Rocky Lake. It is 105 kilometres (65 mi) to Halifax and 68 kilometres (42 mi) to Truro.

== Lakes ==
=== First Rocky Lake ===
First Rocky Lake is the northernmost lake in the Rocky Lake chain. It is connected to Oliphant Lake by a stream. The lake is measures approximately 465 metres (1,526 ft) in length, and 1,264 metres (4,147 ft) in width. It has four inlets and one outlet.

=== Second Rocky Lake ===
Second Rocky Lake is located at the centre of the lake chain. It measures approximately 927 metres (3,041 ft) in length, and 885 metres (2,904 ft) in width. The lake has two inlets, and one outlet.

=== Lower Rocky Lake ===
Lower Rocky Lake is the southernmost lake in the chain. It is connected to Princess Pine Lake, MacDonald Lake, and Round Lake. The lake is measured approximately 2,935 metres (9,629 ft) in length and 917 metres (3,009 ft) in width. It has two inlets and one outlet.

== Access ==
The lake can be accessed via Nova Scotia Route 374 from Sanctuary Road, as well as several minor forest trails.

== See also ==
- List of lakes of Nova Scotia
