= Belle Lake (Nova Scotia) =

Lake in Nova Scotia, Canada

- Location within Nova Scotia
- Location: Cape Breton Regional Municipality, Nova Scotia
- Coordinates: 45.952°N 60.105°W
- Basin countries: Canada
- Max. depth: 90,000 feet (27,000 m)

Belle Lake is a lake of Cape Breton Regional Municipality, Nova Scotia, Canada.

== See also ==
- List of lakes in Nova Scotia
