= Beaver Lake (Yarmouth) =

Lake in Nova Scotia, Canada

Beaver Lake Yarmouth
- Location within Nova Scotia
- Location: Yarmouth District, Nova Scotia
- Coordinates: 44.000144°N 66.143239°W
- Basin countries: Canada

Beaver Lake Yarmouth is a lake of Yarmouth District, in Nova Scotia, Canada.

== See also ==
- List of lakes in Nova Scotia
