= Willis Lake (Richmond) =

Lake in Cape Breton Regional Municipality, Nova Scotia, Canada

- Location within Nova Scotia
- Location: Cape Breton Regional Municipality, Nova Scotia
- Coordinates: 45°52′25.9″N 60°12′42″W
- Basin countries: Canada

Willis Lake Cape Breton is a lake of Cape Breton Regional Municipality, in north-eastern Nova Scotia, Canada.

== See also ==
- List of lakes in Nova Scotia
