= Beaver Lake (Queens) =

Lake in Nova Scotia, Canada

Beaver Lake Queens
- Location within Nova Scotia
- Location: Region of Queens Municipality, Nova Scotia
- Coordinates: 44.259636°N 65.240190°W
- Basin countries: Canada

Beaver Lake Queens is a lake of the Region of Queens Municipality, in Nova Scotia, Canada.

== See also ==
- List of lakes in Nova Scotia
