= Beaver Lake (Victoria, Nova Scotia) =

Lake in Victoria County, Nova Scotia, Canada

Beaver Lake Victoria
- Location within Nova Scotia
- Location: Victoria County, Nova Scotia
- Coordinates: 46°43′6″N 60°30′37″W
- Basin countries: Canada

Beaver Lake Victoria is a lake of Victoria County, in north-eastern Nova Scotia, Canada.

== See also ==
- List of lakes in Nova Scotia
