= South Lake (Victoria) =

Lake in Victoria County, Nova Scotia, Canada

- Location within Nova Scotia
- Location: Victoria County, Nova Scotia
- Coordinates: 46°32′31″N 60°30′0″W
- Basin countries: Canada

South Lake is a lake of Victoria County, in north-eastern Nova Scotia, Canada.

== See also ==
- List of lakes in Nova Scotia
