= Baptizing Lake (Nova Scotia) =

Lake in Nova Scotia, Canada

- Location within Nova Scotia
- Location: Halifax Regional Municipality, Nova Scotia
- Coordinates: 44°43′26.9″N 63°46′1.9″W
- Basin countries: Canada

Baptizing Lake is a lake of Halifax Regional Municipality, Nova Scotia, Canada.

== See also ==
- List of lakes in Nova Scotia
