= Bayers Lake =

Lake in Nova Scotia, Canada

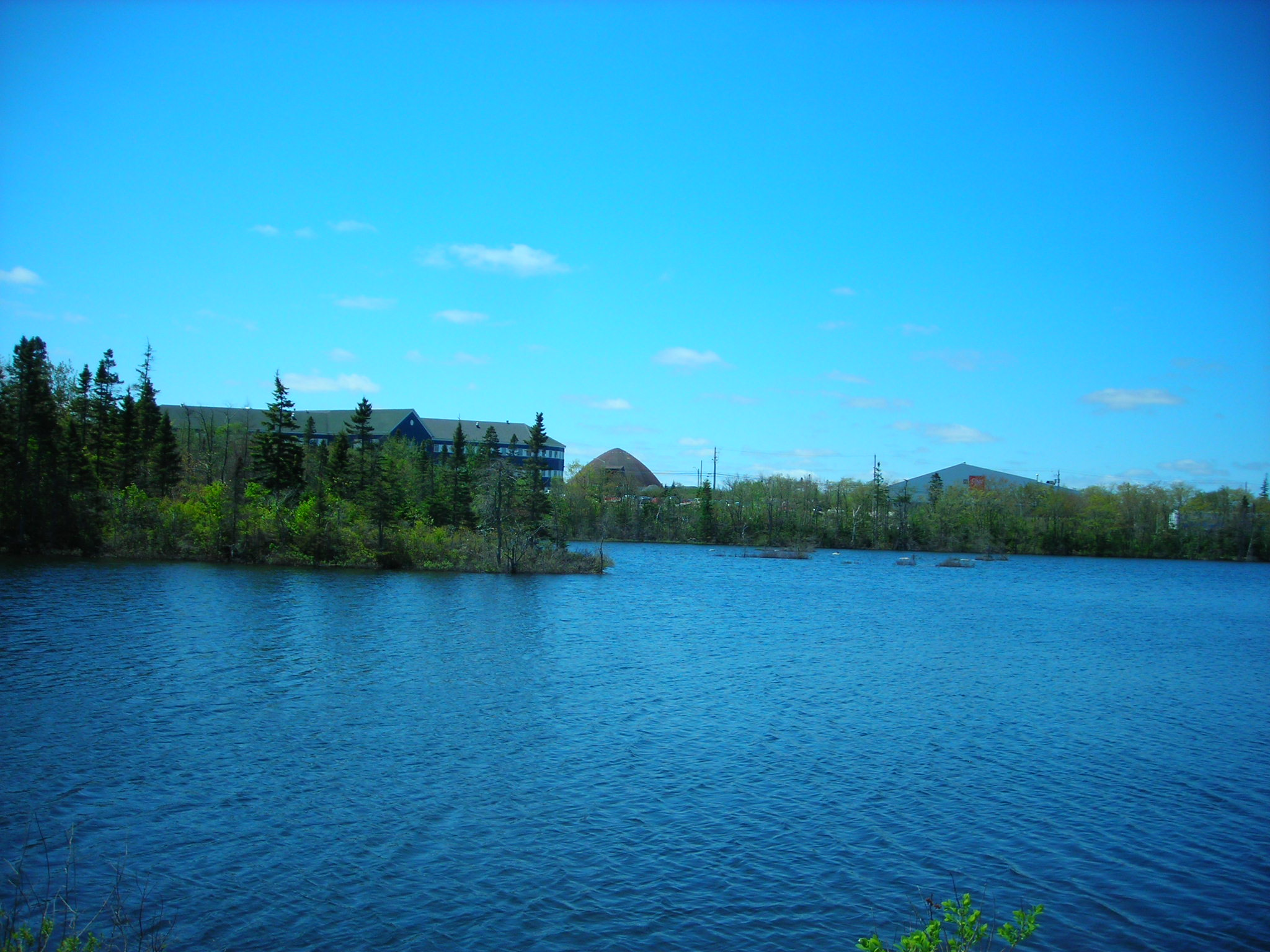
- Picture from the east shore of the lake

- Location within Nova Scotia
- Location: Halifax Regional Municipality, Nova Scotia
- Coordinates: 44°38′31.9″N 63°40′13.9″W
- Basin countries: Canada

Bayers Lake is a lake of Halifax, Nova Scotia, Canada. It is located west of the Halifax Peninsula and the intersection of highways 102 and 103, and in the centre of Bayers Lake Business Park. The historic Halifax and Southwestern Railway ran along the lake's north shore and the railway maintained a siding called "Summit" beside the lake, so named because it was the highest point on the line.

== See also ==
- List of lakes in Nova Scotia
