= Beaver Lake (Pictou) =

Lake in Pictou County, Nova Scotia, Canada

Beaver Lake Pictou
- Location within Nova Scotia
- Location: Pictou County, Nova Scotia
- Coordinates: 45.351°N 62.496°W
- Basin countries: Canada

Beaver Lake Pictou is a lake of Pictou County, in Nova Scotia, Canada.

== See also ==
- List of lakes in Nova Scotia
