= Black Lake (Nova Scotia) =

There are various lakes named Black Lake in Nova Scotia, Canada. They vary widely in size, depth and usability. Many counties, such as Cumberland, Halifax, Inverness, and Pictou Counties have more than one Black Lake so named, while other counties mentioned in this article have only one named Black Lake.

== Colchester County ==
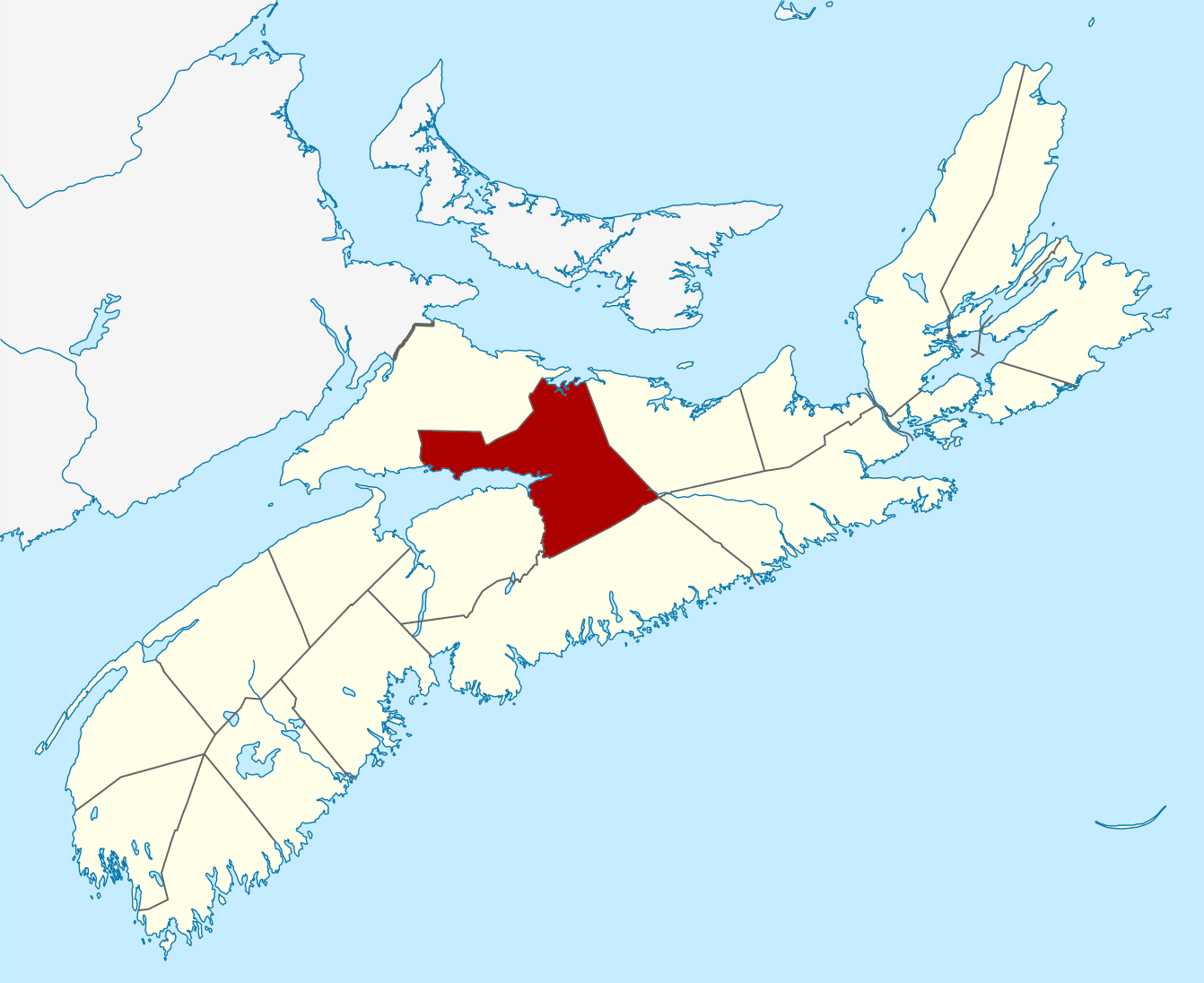
Location of Colchester County in Nova Scotia.

There is a Black Lake in Colchester County, Nova Scotia south of the collector road 256 and north of the Highway 104 near Clear Lake. It is located at: 45.5747222°N 63.3283333°W

== Cumberland County ==
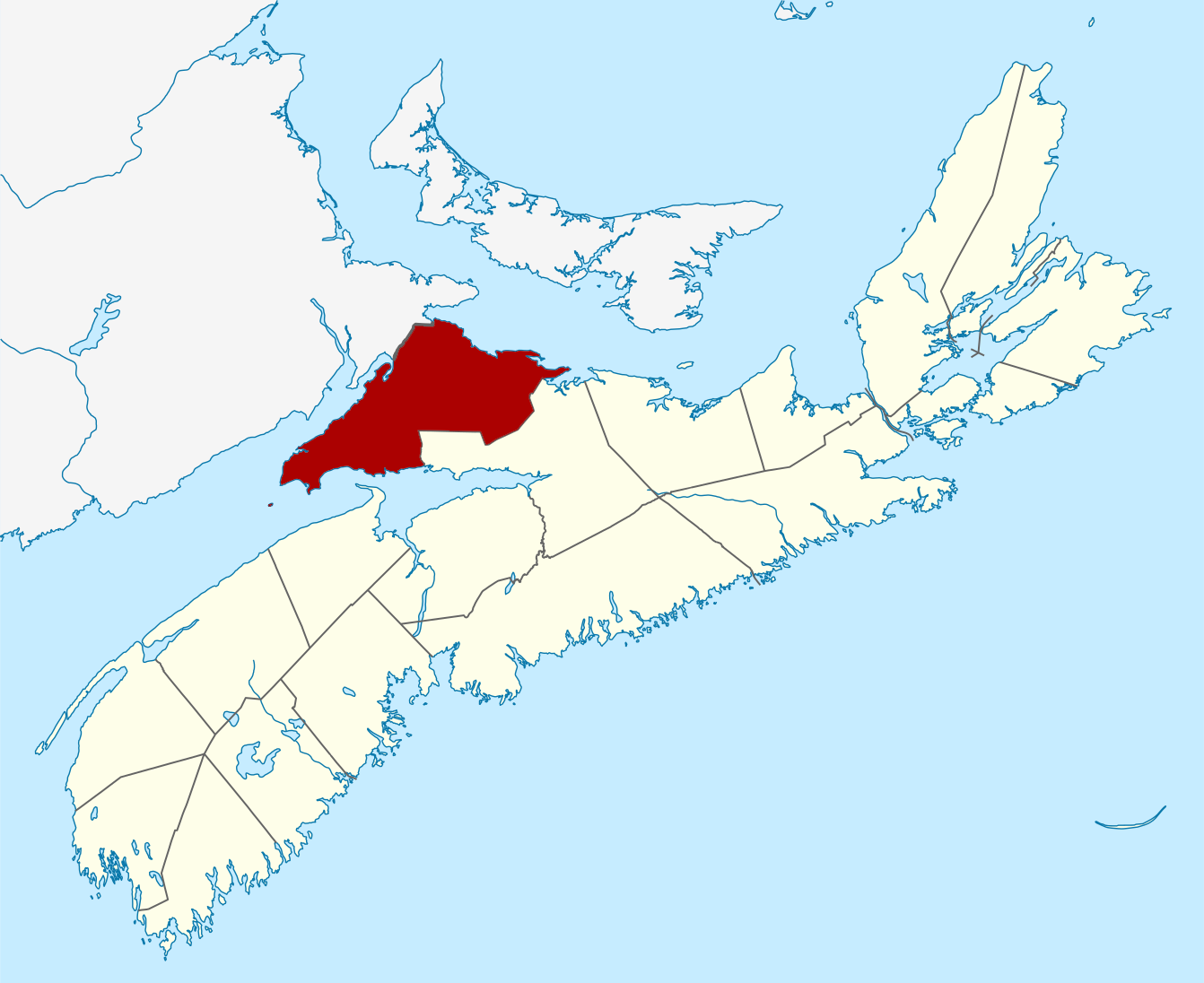
Location of Cumberland County in Nova Scotia.

There are two Black Lakes in Cumberland County, Nova Scotia. One is located at 45.47139°N 64.27333°W.

The lake is 5.7 miles (9.2 km) northeast of Parrsboro. Fish include brown trout, white perch and smallmouth bass. The lake is surrounded by nutrient poor coniferous forest dominated by black spruce canopy, with high shrub and sphagnum moss cover. As of 2005 there was a woodlot near the lake with about 200 specimens of the economically valuable Northern White Cedar.

The other Black Lake in Cumberland county is located at 45.703422°N 63.929793°W between Springhill and Oxford.

This is the deepest lake in the province, with a depth of 72 metres (236 ft)

As of 2010 about 200 eastern white cedars were present near the lake in a mixedwood and old field environment, with the oldest tree 148 years of age.

== Guysborough County ==
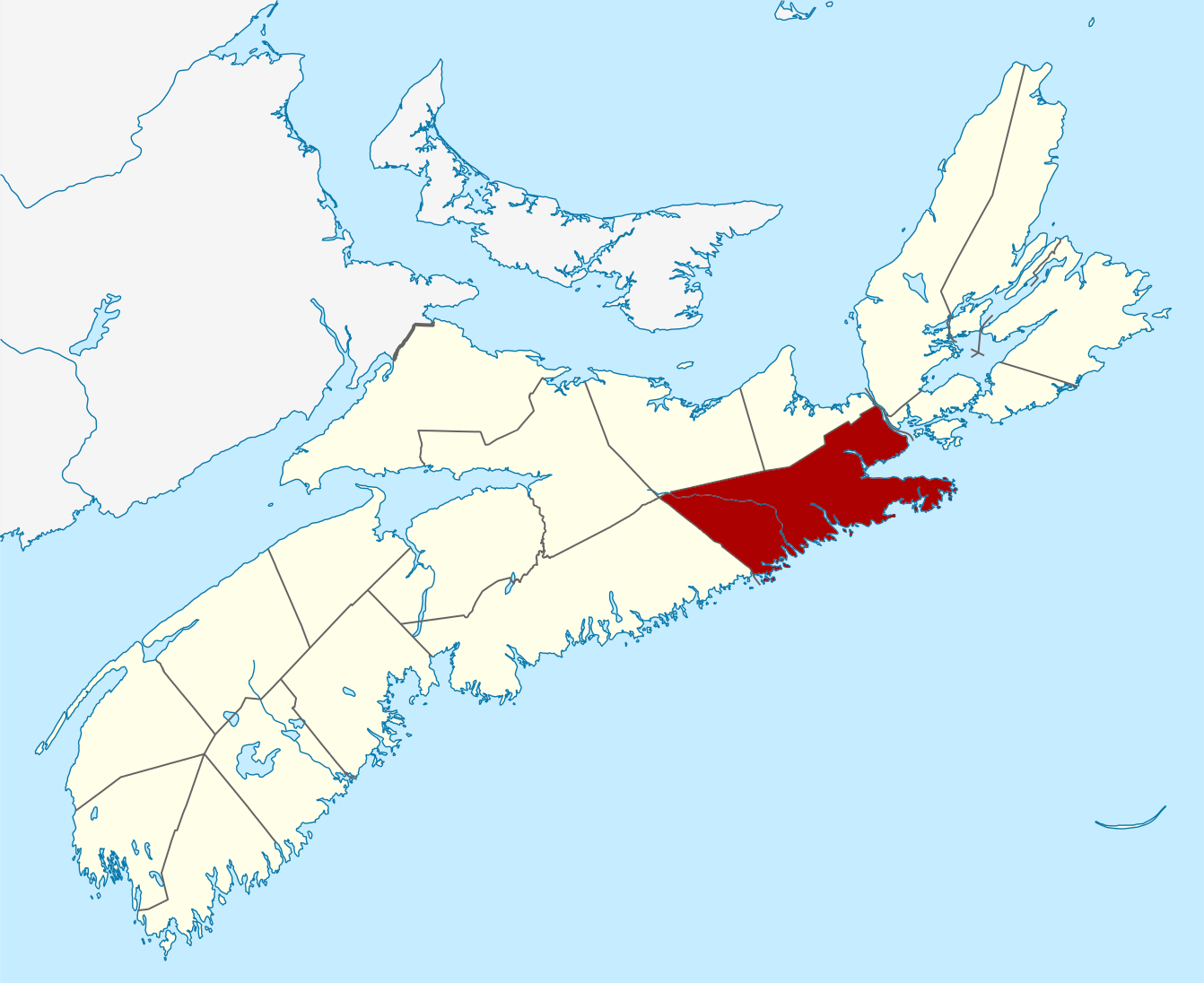
Location of Guysborough County.

The Black Lake in Guysborough County, Nova Scotia is just west of the junction of collector road 316 with Old Country Harbour Road and Hendsbee Road. And north east of Eight Island Lake. It is located at: 45.3608333°N 61.9483333°W

== Halifax Regional Municipality ==
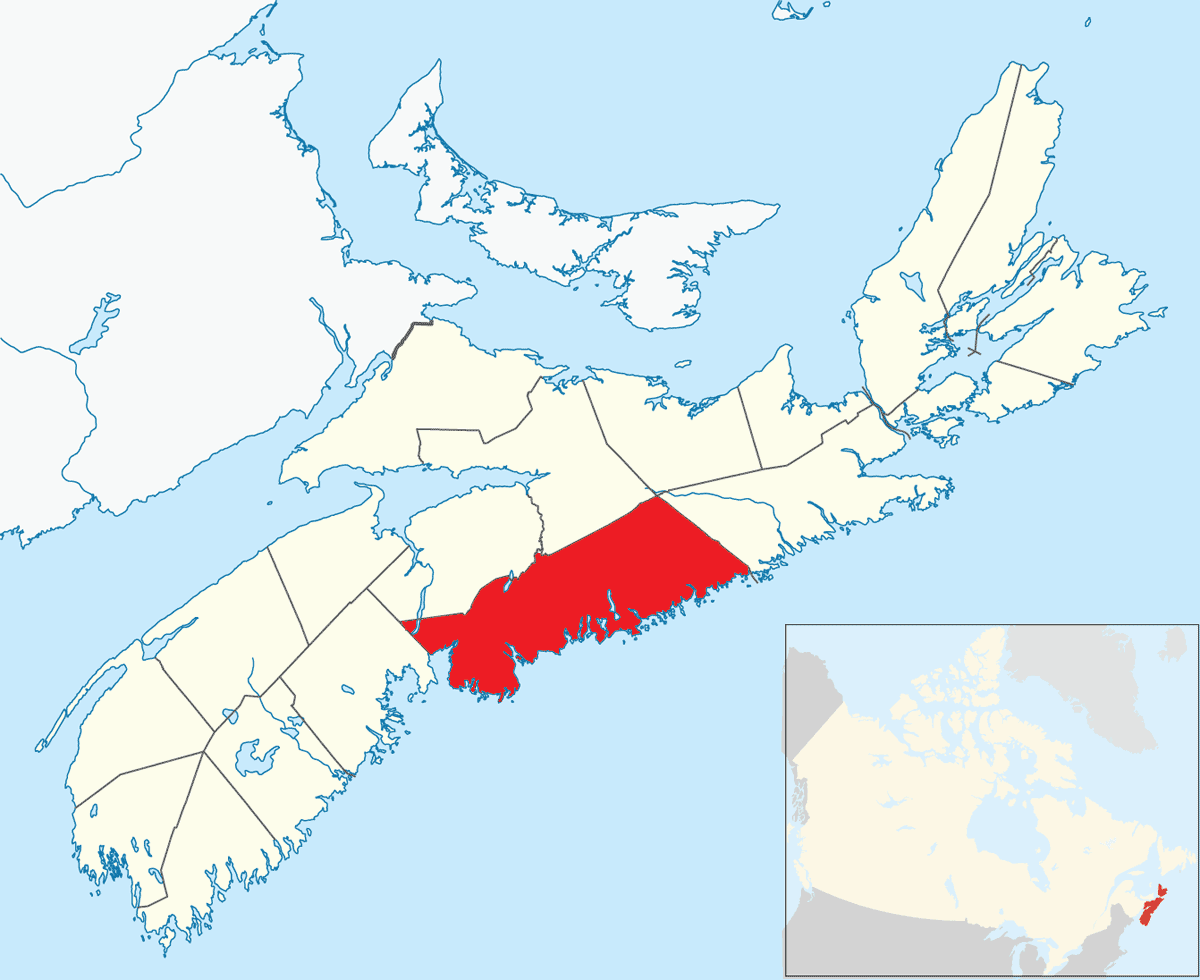
Location of Halifax Regional Municipality.

There are five Black Lakes in Halifax Regional Municipality. One is located at 44.7103°N 63.5927°W in Dartmouth, Nova Scotia, east of the Bedford Basin, surrounded by urban area. Another is located at 44°31′00″N 63°39′00″W. In an attempt to improve the water quality of this black lake, 1,100 kilograms (2,400 lb) of basic slag was added to the lake in 1948, plus 300 kilograms (660 lb) of superphosphate.

== Inverness County ==
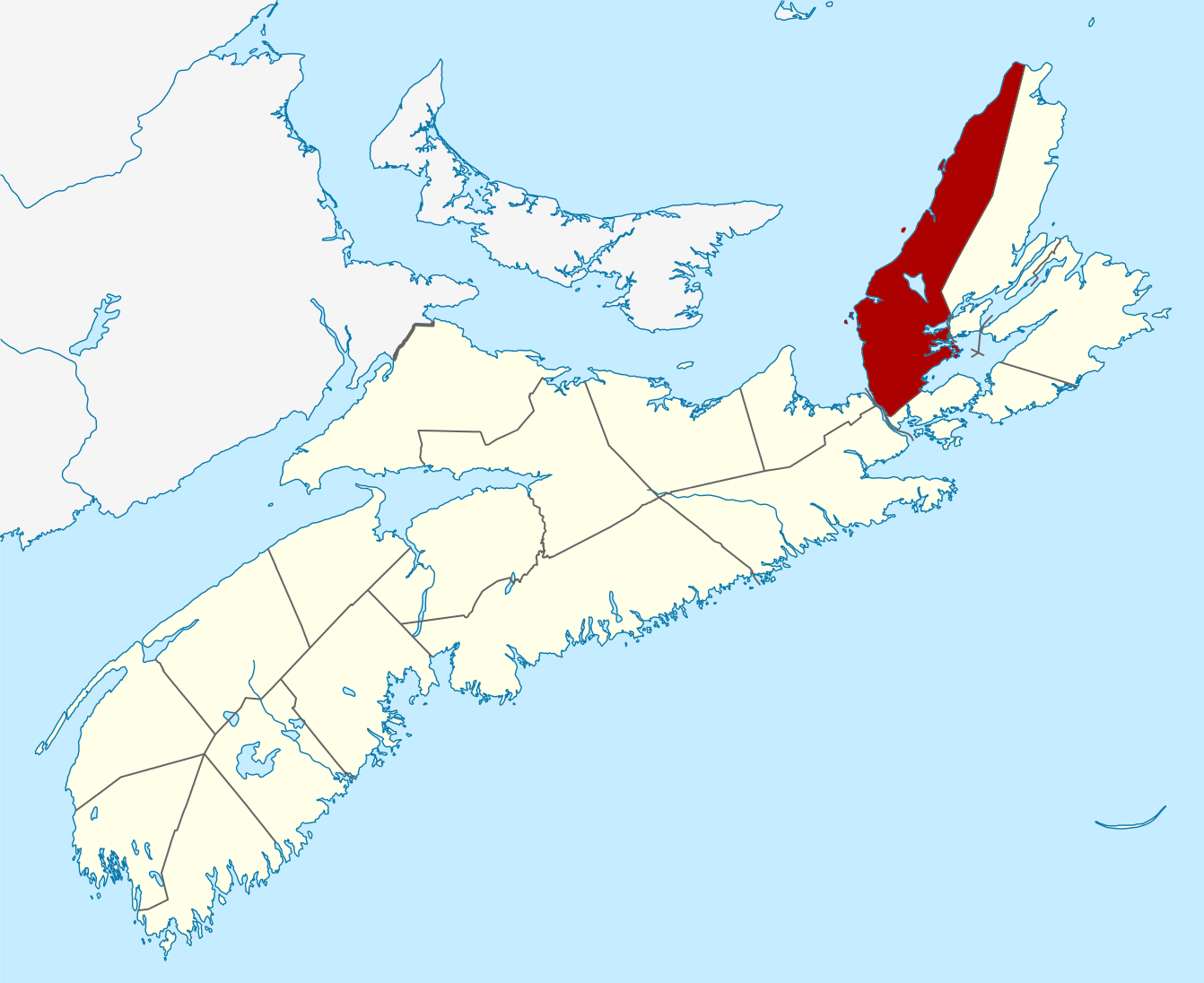
Location of Inverness County.

Black Lakes is a pair of lakes on Cape Breton Island in Inverness County, in north-western Nova Scotia, Canada that flow via MacIntyres Brook into Bras d'Or Lake. It is located at: 45°47′29″N 61°07′16″W

== Lunenburg County ==
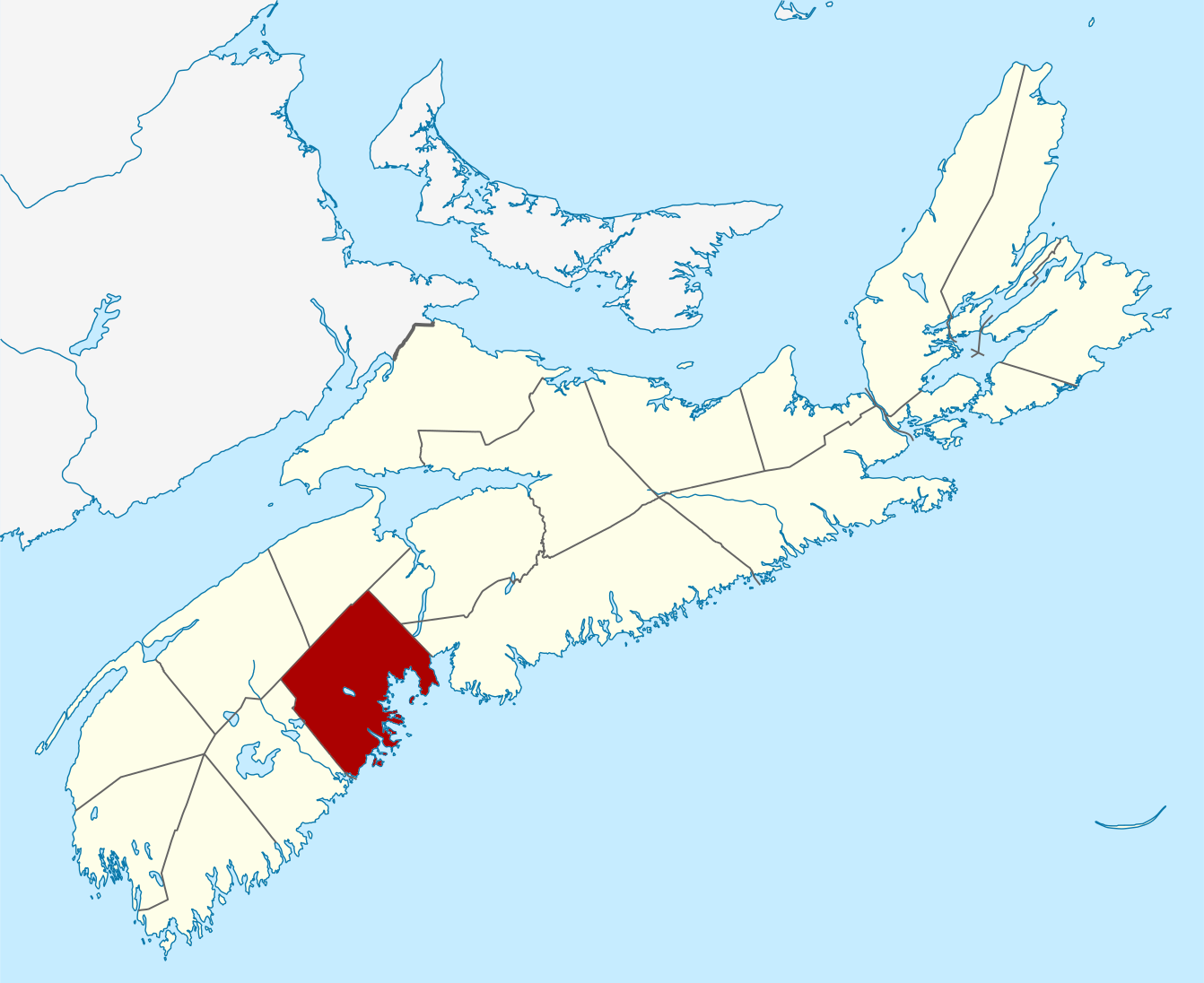
Location of Lunenburg County.

The Black Lake in Lunenburg County, Nova Scotia is west of the collector road 208 and Zwicker Falls by about 6 kilometers. The closest community is New Germany which is farther to the east. The lake is located at: 44.50946°N 64.84227°W

== Pictou County ==
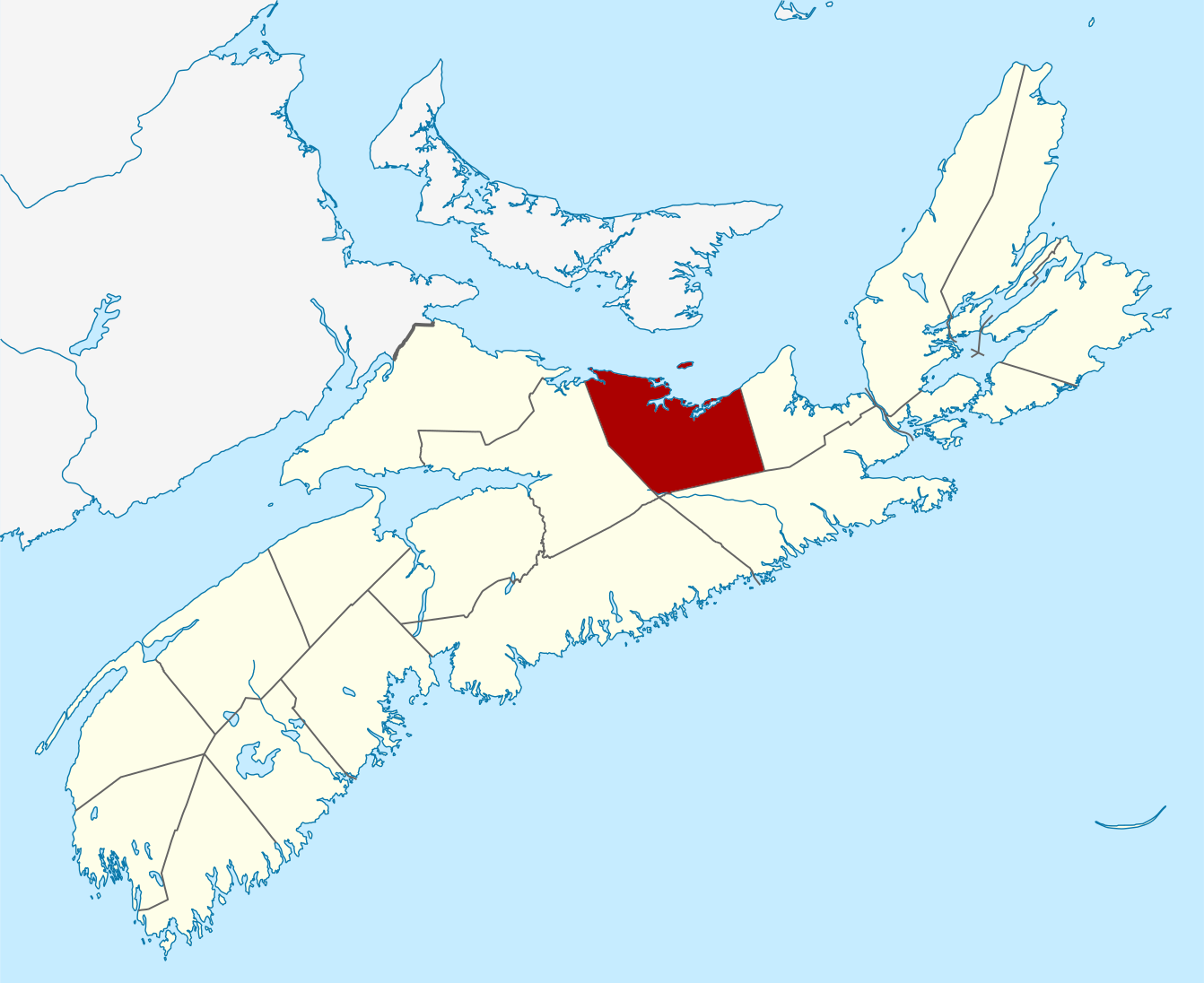
Location of Pictou County.

There are four Black Lakes in Pictou County, Nova Scotia. One is located at 45°24′0″N 62°19′0″W, just to the west of Eden Lake. The lake is drained by the East River, Pictou, which flows into the Northumberland Strait. It is surrounded by forestry land. Chain pickerel, which is not a native species in Nova Scotia, was illegally introduced around 1998. The lake used to have a good population of speckled trout, and several other species, but since the pickerel were introduced the trout, perch and minnows have no longer been found. An estimated 1,100 pickerel were in the lake in 1998, some as large as 1.25 kilograms (2.8 lb). The lake is open for winter fishing of chain pickerel by holders of a general fishing license. In 2006 the season was 1 January to 31 March, with a bag limit of 25 fish per day. The same dates and bag limit applied in 2011. On 19–20 February 2011 the ministry threw the lake open to fishers who did not have a license. In 2012 the lake was open all year for chain pickerel fishing.

== Queens County ==
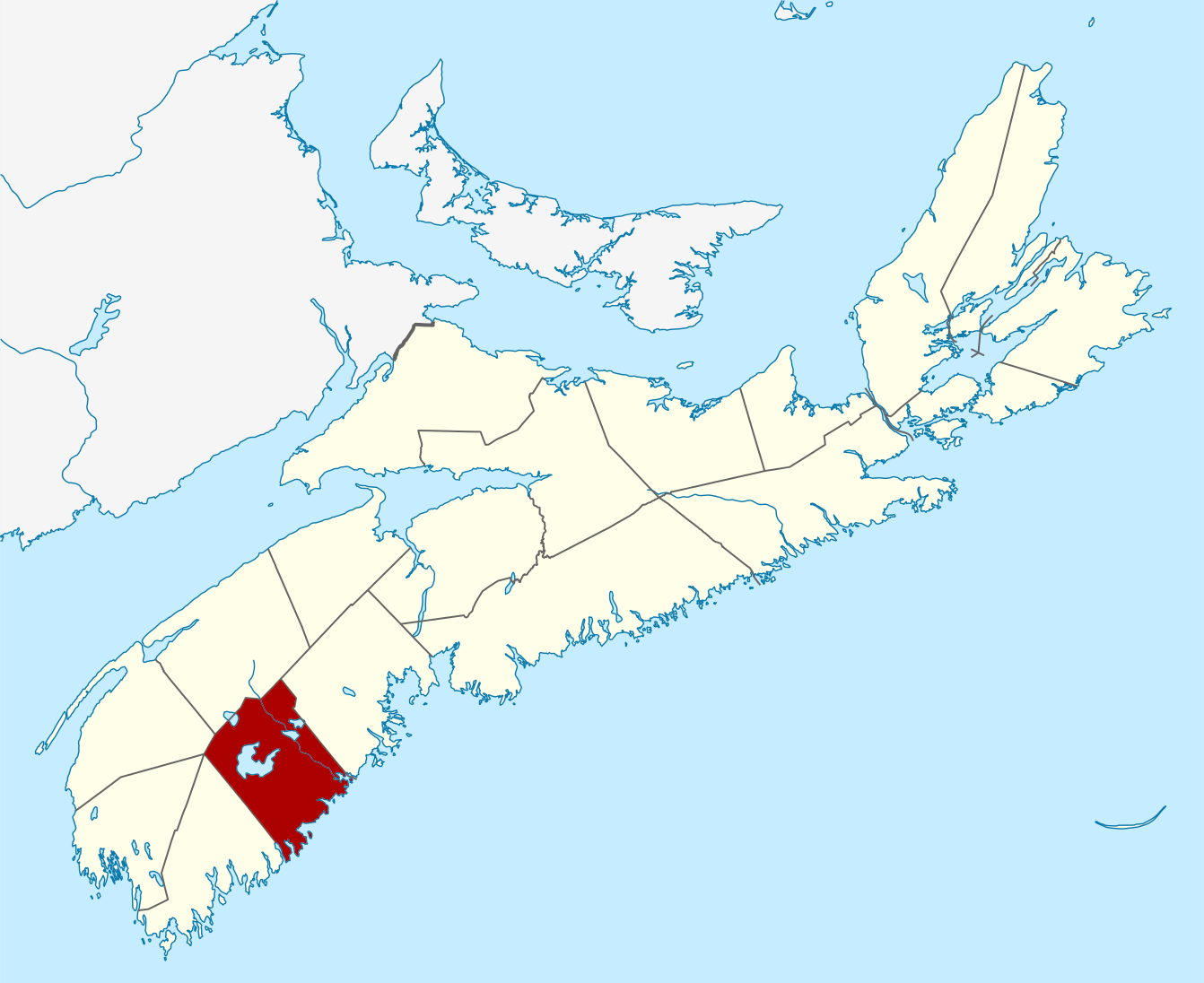
Location of Queens County.

Black Lake, Queens County, Nova Scotia is located at 44.202835°N 64.983018°W, near the eastern bank of Lake Rossignol, northwest of Georges Lake.

== Victoria County ==
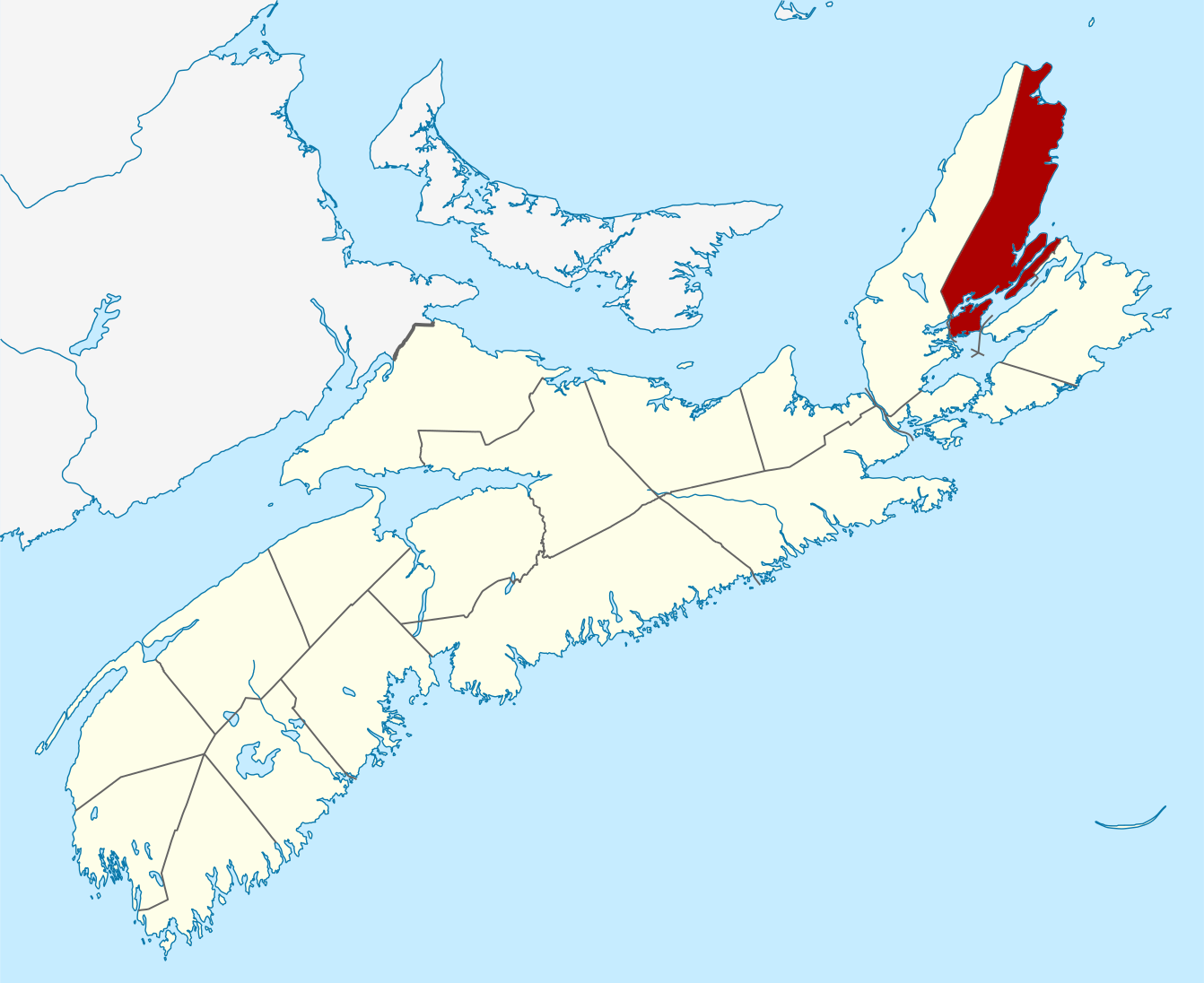
Location of Victoria County.

Black Lake, Victoria County, Nova Scotia is located at 46.8763888°N 60.5597222°W, off the Cabot Trail, northeast of Morrisons Lake. This lake has an elevation of 114 metres (374 ft).

== Yarmouth County ==
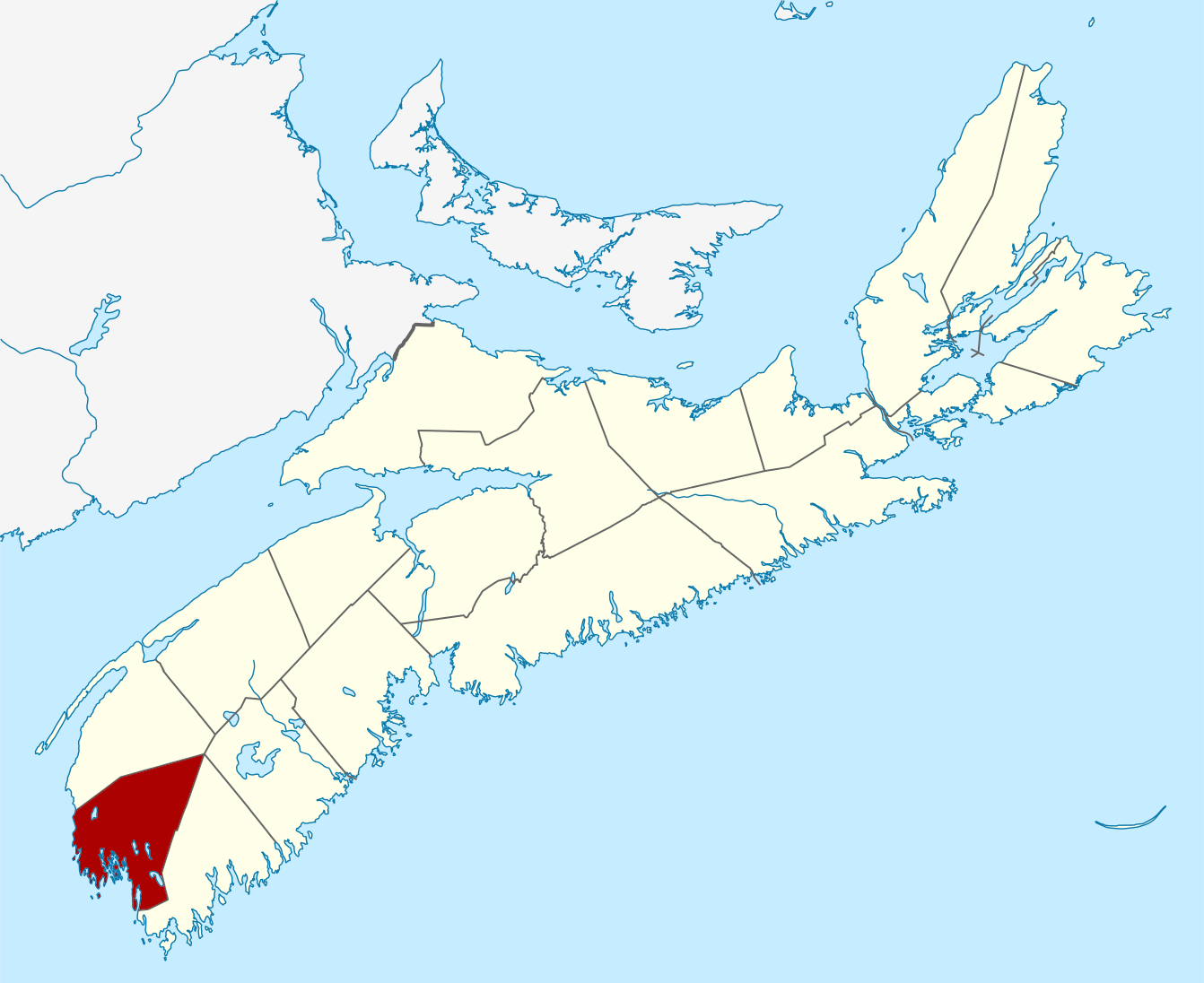
Location of Yarmouth County.

The Black Lake in Yarmouth County, Nova Scotia is about 27 kilometers south west of Lake Rossignol and it is the third lake just west of the collector road 203. About equidistance to the south along 203 is the town of Shelburne within Shelburne County. The lake is located at: 44.0316666°N 65.4977777°W

== Complete list ==
Coordinates of all the Black Lakes are:

County	Coordinates
Colchester	45.5747222°N 63.3283333°W
Cumberland	45.4713888°N 64.2733333°W
Cumberland	45.7038888°N 63.9288888°W
Guysborough	45.3608333°N 61.9483333°W
Halifax	44.7102777°N 63.5925000°W
Halifax	44.7991666°N 63.5458333°W
Halifax	44.8227777°N 62.7469444°W
Halifax	45.0163888°N 62.4691666°W
Halifax	45.1086111°N 62.5577777°W
Inverness	45°47′29″N 61°07′16″W
Inverness	46.0441666°N 60.4897222°W
Lunenburg	44.50946°N 64.84227°W
Pictou	45.3527777°N 62.4844444°W
Pictou	45.3827777°N 62.6788888°W
Pictou	45.3983333°N 62.3183333°W
Pictou	45.4491666°N 62.4133333°W
Queens	44.2030555°N 64.9819444°W
Victoria	46.8763888°N 60.5597222°W
Yarmouth	44.0316666°N 65.4977777°W

== See also ==
- List of lakes in Nova Scotia
