= Enchanted Lake =

Lake in Nova Scotia, Canada

- Location within Nova Scotia
- Location: Halifax Regional Municipality, Nova Scotia
- Coordinates: 44°43′8″N 63°35′33″W
- Basin countries: Canada

Enchanted Lake is a lake of Halifax Regional Municipality, Nova Scotia, Canada, in the southeastern part of the country, 1,000 km east of the capital Ottawa. Enchanted Lake is 48 meters above sea level. The highest point nearby is 84 meters above sea level, 1.0 km east of Enchanted Lake.

It is densely populated around Enchanted Lake, with 1,056 inhabitants per square kilometre.

Average annual temperature in the neighbourhood is 7 °C . The warmest month is August, when the average temperature is 20 °C, and the coldest is January, about -6 °C. Average annual rain is 1,826 mm. The rainy month is December, with an average of 299 mm rainfall, and the driest is May, with 84 mm rainfall.

== See also ==
- List of lakes in Nova Scotia
