= Fox Lake (Devon) =

Lake in Halifax, Nova Scotia, Canada

- Location within Nova Scotia
- Location: Halifax Regional Municipality, Nova Scotia
- Coordinates: 44°50′56.9″N 63°19′42.9″W
- Basin countries: Canada

Fox Lake is a lake of Halifax Regional Municipality, Nova Scotia, Canada.

== See also ==
- List of lakes in Nova Scotia
