= Sheehan Lake =

Lake in Nova Scotia

- Interactive map of Sheehan Lake
- Location: Williamswood, Halifax County
- Coordinates: 44°30′3″N 63°37′47″W
- Etymology: Family of early residents
- Basin countries: Canada
- Max. length: 673.13 metres (2,208.4 ft)
- Max. width: 559.6 metres (1,836 ft)

Sheehan Lake is a glacial lake in Halifax County, Nova Scotia, Canada. The lake was named after a family of early residents. It is 16.86 kilometres (10.48 mi) from Halifax and 100 kilometres (62 mi) from Truro.

== Geography ==
Sheehan Lake is in the community of Williamswood. It is connected by Grand Lake and Grover Lake by an unnamed stream. The lake is measured 673.13 metres (2,208.4 ft) in length, and 559.6 metres (1,836 ft) in width. Near lakes include Ragged Lake, Little Trout Lake, Little Pond, and Burnt Hill Lake.

== Access ==
The lake is adjacent to Old Sambro Road, providing direct roadside visibility and access.

== See also ==
- List of lakes of Nova Scotia
- Nova Scotia Route 306
- Long Lake Provincial Park
