= Springfield Lake (Annapolis) =

Lake in Annapolis County, Nova Scotia, Canada

- Location within Nova Scotia
- Location: Annapolis County, Nova Scotia
- Coordinates: 44°38′0″N 64°51′29″W
- Basin countries: Canada

Springfield Lake is a lake of Annapolis County, in Nova Scotia, Canada.

== See also ==
- List of lakes in Nova Scotia
