= Seventeen Mile Lake =

Lake in Nova Scotia, Canada

- Interactive map of Seventeen Mile Lake
- Location: Halifax County, Guysborough County
- Coordinates: 45°11′07″N 62°32′44″W
- Basin countries: Canada

Seventeen Mile Lake is a lake in both Halifax County and Guysborough County, Nova Scotia, Canada. It was named on September 10, 1953. The lake is approximately 101.86 kilometres (63.29 mi) from Halifax, and 62.42 kilometres (38.79 mi) from Truro.

== Geography ==
Seventeen Mile Lake is measured approximately 1,087 metres (3,566 ft) in length and 249 metres (817 ft) in width. The lake has inlets on its northwestern and southeastern sides, while an outlet is located on the western side.

== See also ==
- List of lakes of Nova Scotia
- Seloam Lake
- Liscomb Sanctuary
