= Boggy Lake =

Lake in Nova Scotia, Canada

- Location within Nova Scotia
- Location: Guysborough District, Nova Scotia
- Coordinates: 45°5.93′N 62°18.908′W
- Basin countries: Canada
- Surface area: 1.1 km^{2} (0.42 sq mi)

Boggy Lake is a lake of Guysborough District, in Nova Scotia, Canada. It also extends into Halifax County. This natural area is characterized by well-defined drumlins with mature to immature old-growth sugar maple, yellow birch, and beech forests, that sit in a matrix of well-drained coniferous hummocky terrain.

== See also ==
- List of lakes in Nova Scotia
