= South Lake (Hants) =

Lake in Hants County, Nova Scotia, Canada

- Location within Nova Scotia
- Location: West Hants, Nova Scotia
- Coordinates: 44°46′22″N 64°1′59″W
- Basin countries: Canada

South Lake is a lake of West Hants, in Nova Scotia, Canada.

== See also ==
- List of lakes in Nova Scotia
