= Ellen Brown Lake =

Lake in Nova Scotia, Canada

- Location within Nova Scotia
- Location: Pictou County, Nova Scotia
- Coordinates: 45.300°N 62.721°W
- Basin countries: Canada

Ellen Brown Lake (Note: Not to be confused with Little Ellen Brown Lake, located at 45.345833°N 62.748611°W a few miles to the north) is a lake of Pictou County, in Nova Scotia, Canada.

Ellen Brown Lake is in the headwaters of the West Branch of St. Mary's River. The lake lies just north of the Nelson River, a tributary of the St. Mary's. Environment Canada collected water quality data in the lake in 1997. Selected findings were alkalinity 2 mg/L CaCO_{3}, pH 6.29, total nitrogen 0.112 mg/L and total phosphorus 0.0049 mg/L.

== See also ==
- List of lakes in Nova Scotia

== Sources ==
- King, M.S. (2005). "Airborne total field VLF-EM (Line Component) Map for part of NTS 11W/07, Hopewell Area, Nova Scotia" (PDF). Nova Scotia Department of Natural Resources, Mineral Resources Branch.
- Mitchell, Sean C. (2011-10-14). "Water Quality of the St. Mary's River Watershed. A Detailed Analysis" (PDF). St. Mary’s River Association. Archived from the original (PDF) on 2015-10-02.
