= South Lake (Halifax) =

Lake in Halifax Regional Municipality, Nova Scotia, Canada

South Lake, Halifax
- Location within Nova Scotia
- Location: Halifax Regional Municipality, Nova Scotia
- Coordinates: 44.774337°N 64.032377°W
- Basin countries: Canada

South Lake, Halifax is a lake of Halifax Regional Municipality, Nova Scotia, Canada.

== See also ==
- List of lakes in Nova Scotia
