= Chezzetcook Lake =

Lake in Nova Scotia

- Interactive map of Chezzetcook Lake
- Location: Nova Scotia
- Coordinates: 44°46′41″N 63°13′49″W
- Type: Glacial lake
- Etymology: Chillincook
- Primary inflows: Chezzetcook River
- Primary outflows: Chezzetcook River
- Basin countries: Canada
- Max. length: 3.8 kilometres (2.4 mi)
- Max. width: 1 kilometre (0.62 mi)

Chezzetcook Lake (IPA: /ˈtʃɛz.ɪt.kʊk leɪk/) is a glacial lake located in Halifax County, Nova Scotia, Canada. The lake has an associated river named Chezzetcook river. It measures approximately 28 kilometres (17 mi) to Halifax and 68.5 kilometres (42.6 mi) to Truro.

== Etymology ==
Chezzetcook Lake is named after Chezzetcook, an older spelling of “Chillincook.” The name was historically associated with and included within Musquodoboit. It is derived from the Mi’kmaq word Sesetkook or Tcesetkook, meaning “flowing rapidly in many channels.”

== Geography ==
Chezzetcook Lake measures approximately 3.8 kilometres (2.4 mi) in length and 1 kilometre (0.62 mi) in width. It is fed by two inlets and drains through a single outlet. Other nearby lakes include Paces Lake, Scots Lake, Conrod Lake, and Petpeswick Lake.

== Access ==
Chezzetcook lake can be accessed via Nova Scotia Highway 7 on Marine Drive and Nova Scotia Route 107. It is also accessible via minor forest trails.

== See also ==
- List of lakes of Nova Scotia
