= Oak Lake (Nova Scotia) =

Oak Lake (Nova Scotia) could mean the following lakes:

== Annapolis County ==
- Oak Lake (Annapolis County, Nova Scotia) located at 44°31′26″N 65°24′18″W

== Digby County ==
- Oak Lake (Digby County, Nova Scotia) located at 44°20′55″N 65°48′3″W

== Guysborough County ==
- Oak Lake (Guysborough County, Nova Scotia) located at 45°18′32″N 62°16′40″W

== Halifax Regional Municipality ==
- Oak Lake located at 44°47′51″N 63°1′55″W
- Oak Lake located at 44°54′0″N 63°38′34″W

== Kings County ==
- Oak Lake (Kings County, Nova Scotia) located at 44°51′40″N 64°45′31″W
