= Tomahawk Lake (Halifax) =

Lake in Nova Scotia, Canada

- Location within Nova Scotia
- Location: Halifax Regional Municipality, Nova Scotia
- Coordinates: 44.778°N 63.803°W
- Basin countries: Canada
- Surface elevation: 100 m (330 ft)

Tomahawk Lake (Halifax) is a lake of Halifax Regional Municipality, Nova Scotia, Canada. The Tomahawk Lake watershed is approximately 1550 hectares and is managed by the Halifax Regional Water Commission as a potential future source of expansion to the municipality's drinking water supply.

== See also ==
- List of lakes in Nova Scotia
