= Third Lake (Nova Scotia) =

Third Lake (Nova Scotia) could refer to one of many lakes:

== Annapolis County ==
- Third Lake located at 44°47′20″N 65°11′2″W

== Cape Breton Regional Municipality ==
- Third Lake located at 45°59′32″N 59°52′54″W

== Digby County ==
- Third Lake located at 44°22′43″N 65°43′57″W
- Third Lake located at 44°9′28″N 66°5′12″W

== Guysborough County ==
- Third Lake located at 45°16′9″N 61°19′7″W
- Third Lake located at 45°8′44″N 61°57′31″W
- Third Lake located at 45°8′59″N 61°55′0″W
- Third Lake located at 45°12′17″N 61°26′42″W

== Halifax Regional Municipality ==
- Third Lake located at 44°47′35″N 63°38′2″W
- Third Lake located at 44°51′13″N 62°40′53″W
- Third Lake located at 44°57′27″N 62°20′31″W
- Third Lake located at 44°31′25″N 63°43′30″W
- Third Lake located at 44°30′30″N 63°54′56″W

== Richmond County ==
- Third Lake located at 45°0′58″N 62°24′30″W

== Shelburne County ==
- Third Lake located at 43°40′14″N 65°38′30″W

== Victoria County ==
- Third Lake O'Law located at 46°14′55″N 60°57′0″W

== Yarmouth County ==
- Third Lake located at 43°59′8″N 65°49′38″W
