= Sullivan Lake (Halifax) =

Lake in Nova Scotia, Canada

- Location in Nova Scotia
- Location: Halifax Regional Municipality, Nova Scotia
- Coordinates: 44°52′56″N 63°34′34″W
- Primary outflows: Unnamed creek to Bennery Lake
- Basin countries: Canada
- Max. length: 260 metres (850 ft)
- Max. width: 100 metres (330 ft)
- Surface elevation: 68 metres (223 ft)

Sullivan Lake is a lake in Halifax Regional Municipality, Nova Scotia, Canada. The primary outflow is an unnamed creek to Bennery Lake that flows via Bennery Brook and the Shubenacadie River to Cobequid Bay on the Minas Basin, part of the Bay of Fundy.

== See also ==
- List of lakes in Nova Scotia
