= Squirrel Lake =

Lake in Oneida County, Wisconsin

- Location within Wisconsin Location within the United States
- Location: Vilas County and Oneida County, Wisconsin
- Coordinates: 45.8687299°N 89.8947645°W
- Type: reservoir
- Basin countries: United States
- Surface area: 1,309 acres (530 ha)
- Max. depth: 46 feet (14 m)

Squirrel Lake is a 1,309 acres (530 ha) lake in Vilas County and Oneida County, Wisconsin. It has a maximum depth of 46 feet. Several species of fish inhabit the lake and fishing is accessible via a public boat launch. Writer Winifred Dunn spent time during her youth on an island at Squirrel Lake. Minocqua, Wisconsin and the community of Bo-Di-Lac border the lake. The max depth is 46 feet (14 m).

A 1918 edition of Field and Stream discussed camping by Squirrel Lake as part of a canoe trips. Water levels in the lake have been managed by Wisconsin Valley Improvement Company (WVIC). The lake has been noted for its water quality and waterfowl.

In 1900, Squirrel Lake was included in a surveyor's report.
