= Brigadoon Lodge =

Trout-fishing lodge in Northeast Georgia

Coordinates: 34.710772°N 83.572970°W

Brigadoon Lodge is a privately owned trout-fishing lodge located on the Soque River in Northeast Georgia. A strict catch-and-release policy and diligent upkeep of the river fauna have kept this stretch of the river clean and cool, which has led to one of the highest fish counts per riverfront in North America. Brigadoon Lodge has been ranked No. 1 trout fishery in North America by ESPN.com, and has appeared in such periodicals as Field And Stream and Outdoor Traveler Magazine.

The property on Brigadoon Lodge is also known for its abundant and robust hemlock population, which is monitored and up-kept by the University of Georgia Forestry Department.
