= Beaver Lake point =

Type of American paleoindian projectile point

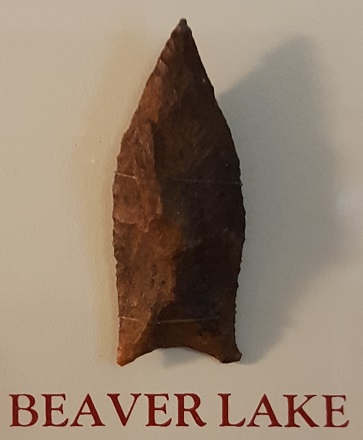
Beaver Lake projectile point collected in Florida by Julius Alvin Hendrix, on display in the Matheson History Museum

The Beaver Lake point is a projectile point of the Paleoindian period, found in the United States. Archaeologists have related this point to the Dalton tradition and to the Simpson point.

Beaver Lake points are lanceolate (leave-shaped), narrow, and side-notched. They are 4.1 to 5.1 centimetres (1.6 to 2.0 in) long, 1.7 to 2.1 centimetres (0.67 to 0.83 in) wide, and 0.4 to 0.5 centimetres (0.16 to 0.20 in) thick.

Beaver Lake points are found in the Ohio and Tennessee river valleys and to a lesser extend in adjacent areas and much of the Southeastern United States.
