= Otter Lake (Nova Scotia) =

Otter Lake is the name of a number of lakes, rives and a community in Nova Scotia).

== Lakes ==
=== Cape Breton Regional Municipality ===
- Otter Lake at 45°55′19″N 60°19′8″W
- Otter Lake at 45°52′14″N 60°24′27″W

=== Cumberland County ===
- Otter Lake at 45°28′0″N 64°13′0″W

=== Guysborough County ===
- Otter Lake at 45°18′19″N 61°47′27″W
- Otter Lake at 45°12′58″N 61°25′57″W
- Otter Lake at 45°3′56″N 62°4′54″W
- Otter Lake at 45°9′7″N 62°4′4″W
- Otter Lake at 45°6′54″N 62°5′26″W
- Otter Lake at 45°19′58″N 61°58′12″W

=== Halifax Regional Municipality ===
- Otter Lake at 44°45′42″N 63°23′49″W
- Otter Lake at 45°12′31″N 62°41′22″W
- Otter Lake at 45°11′15″N 62°35′4″W
- Otter Lake at 44°50′22″N 62°51′10″W
- Otter Lake at 44°53′39″N 63°17′52″W
- Otter Lake at 44°51′26″N 63°18′49″W
- Otter Lake at 44°54′50″N 62°52′21″W
- Otter Lake at 44°48′4″N 63°6′41″W
- Otter Lake at 44°37′34″N 63°43′31″W
- Otter Lake at 44°32′20″N 63°51′35″W
- Otter Lakes at 44°49′29″N 62°49′19″W

=== Lunenburg County ===
- Otter Lake at 44°41′12″N 64°31′9″W
- Otter Lake at 44°40′45″N 64°10′26″W
- Otter Lake at 44°29′59″N 64°50′59″W

=== Victoria County ===
- Otter Lakes at 46°46′31″N 60°37′47″W

=== Yarmouth County ===
- Otter Lake at 44°6′32″N 65°35′11″W

== Rivers ==
- Otter Lake Brook in Halifax Regional Municipality at 44°59′0″N 62°46′57″W
- Otter Lake Brook in Halifax Regional Municipality at 44°36′0″N 63°42′57″W
- Otter Lake Brook in Hants County at 44°49′0″N 64°15′57″W

== Community ==
- Otter Lake, Nova Scotia an unincorporated area in the Halifax Regional Municipality 44°37′23″N 63°43′50″W
