= First Lake (Nova Scotia) =

First Lake (Nova Scotia) could refer to one of the following :

== Annapolis County ==
- First Lake located at 44°46′40″N 65°11′34″W
- First Lake located at 44°41′42″N 65°29′6″W
- First Lake located at 44°29′57″N 65°13′1″W

== Guysborough County ==
- First Lake located at 45°11′38″N 61°26′26″W
- First Lake located at 45°15′50″N 61°19′18″W
- First Lake located at 45°7′8″N 62°6′2″W
- First Lake located at 45°1′52″N 62°2′52″W

== Halifax Regional Municipality ==
- First Lake located at 44°30′9″N 63°54′31″W
- First Lake located at 44°56′15″N 62°21′6″W
- First Lake located at 44°49′54″N 62°38′56″W
- First Lake located at 44°46′18″N 63°39′43″W

== Inverness County ==
- First Lake O'Law located at 46°16′41″N 60°57′39″W

== Region of Queens Municipality ==
- First Lake located at 44°7′14″N 65°5′32″W
- First Lake located at 44°3′5″N 65°0′6″W

== Richmond County ==
- First Lake located at 45°39′29″N 60°45′24″W
- First Lake located at 45°38′20″N 61°1′0″W

== Yarmouth County ==
- First Lake located at 43°38′39″N 65°37′5″W
