= Spectacle Lake (Nova Scotia) =

Spectacle Lake (Nova Scotia) could mean the following :

== Annapolis County ==
- Spectacle Lakes at 44°42′37″N 65°9′10″W

== Cape Breton Regional Municipality ==
- Spectacle Lakes at 45°53′28″N 60°5′50″W

== Municipality of the District of Chester ==
- Spectacle Lake at 44°40′38″N 64°20′32″W
- Spectacle Lakes at 44°34′6″N 64°14′6″W

== Municipality of Clare ==
- Spectacle Lake at 44°16′33″N 66°3′48″W

== Municipality of East Hants ==
- Spectacle Lakes at 44°56′12″N 63°49′57″W

== Halifax Regional Municipality ==
- Spectacle Lake at 44°48′58″N 62°48′25″W
- Spectacle Lake at 44°42′9″N 63°34′53″W
- Spectacle Lakes at 44°58′54″N 62°42′8″W
- Spectacle Lakes at 45°5′27″N 62°31′42″W

== Kings County ==
- Spectacle Lake at 44°42′51″N 64°45′20″W

== Region of Queens Municipality ==
- Spectacle Lake at 44°25′7″N 65°4′50″W
- Spectacle Lakes at 44°16′15″N 64°43′1″W

== Lunenburg County ==
- Spectacle Lakes at 44°15′25″N 64°36′31″W
- Spectacle Lakes at 44°22′40″N 64°23′2″W

== Shelburne County ==
- Spectacle Lake at 44°8′36″N 65°22′19″W

== Yarmouth County ==
- Spectacle Lake at 44°1′29″N 66°5′41″W
