= First Lake (Richmond County, Nova Scotia) =

Lake in Nova Scotia, Canada

- Location within Nova Scotia
- Location: Richmond County, Nova Scotia
- Coordinates: 45°38′20″N 61°1′0″W
- Basin countries: Canada

First Lake is a lake of Richmond County, in north-eastern Nova Scotia, Canada.

== See also ==
- List of lakes in Nova Scotia
