= Flat Lake Provincial Park =

Provincial park in British Columbia

- IUCN category II (national park)
- Location within British Columbia
- Interactive map of Flat Lake Provincial Park
- Location: Lillooet Land District, British Columbia, Canada
- Nearest city: 100 Mile House, BC
- Coordinates: 51°30′02″N 121°30′47″W
- Area: 4,275 ha (10,560 acres)
- Established: July 13, 1995
- Governing body: BC Parks

Flat Lake Provincial Park is a provincial park in British Columbia, Canada. It features a number of interconnected lakes referred to as the "Davis Lake Chain" by locals. The park is located southwest of the municipalities of 100 Mile House and Lone Butte.

== See also ==
- Chasm Provincial Park
- Moose Valley Provincial Park
