= Beaver Lake Nature Center =

Natural area in New York, United States

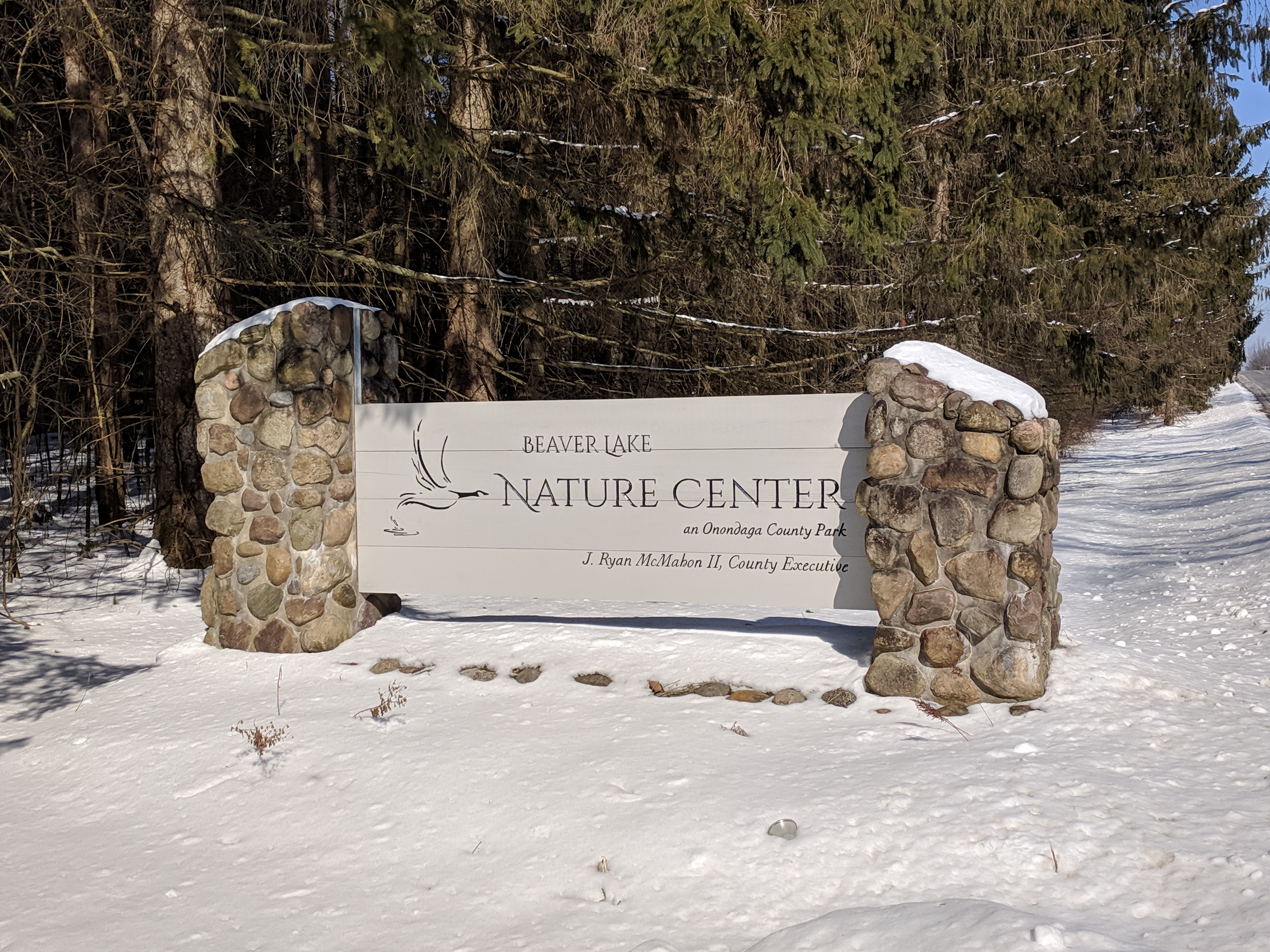
- Interactive map of Beaver Lake Nature Center
- Type: Nature center
- Location: Lysander, New York
- Nearest city: Syracuse, New York
- Coordinates: 43°10′52″N 76°24′28″W
- Operator: Onondaga County, New York

Beaver Lake Nature Center is a 661-acre (2.67 km^{2}) natural area located four miles (6.4 km) west of Baldwinsville, New York. The Nature Center is an Onondaga County Parks facility and is meant to expose visitors to a variety of outdoor experiences.

The nature center is open year-round (except Thanksgiving and Christmas) from 7:30 a.m. to near dusk. There is a $5 per vehicle admission fee for visiting (2025). Dogs, except service animals are not permitted at the Park. Fishing and bikes are also not permitted in the Park.

Ten miles (16 km) of trails allow people to explore the diverse habitats which can be found at the center. It also serves as an environmental educational facility with as many as 12,000 school children visiting each year. The year-round operation of the facility makes the outdoor experience available to a wide range of people.

In summer months canoes and kayaks are available to rent. In spring and fall the lake serves as a migratory stop for thousands of ducks and Canada geese. The park is also opened in the winter with the trails used for cross-country skiing and snowshoeing. When snow conditions allow, the park also rents snowshoes for adults and children.

The Nature Center serves to enhance the appreciation, awareness, and understanding of the natural world for visitors of all ages.

Beaver lake is supported by the not-for-profit Friends of Beaver Lake, Inc. This membership-based organization provides financial and volunteer support to the community Nature Center.
