= Brigadoon, Lexington =

Brigadoon
- Neighborhood of Lexington, Kentucky
- Interactive map of Brigadoon
- Coordinates: 37.987°N 84.521°W
- Country: United States
- State: Kentucky
- County: Fayette
- City: Lexington

Area
  - Total: .205 sq mi (0.53 km^{2})
  - Water: 0 sq mi (0.0 km^{2})

Population (2000)
  - Total: 664
  - Density: 3,238/sq mi (1,250/km^{2})
- Time zone: UTC-5 (Eastern (EST))
  - Summer (DST): UTC-4 (EDT)
- ZIP code: 40517
- Area code: 859

Brigadoon is a neighborhood in southeastern Lexington, Kentucky, United States. its boundaries are Reynolds Road to the north, Lansdowne Drive to the east, Wilson Downing Road to the south, and Nicholasville Road to the west.

== Neighborhood statistics ==
- Area: 0.205 square miles (0.53 km^{2})
- Population: 664
- Population density: 3,238 people per square mile
- Median household income: $46,211
