= River Lake (Winter Haven, Florida) =

- Location within Florida Location within the United States
- Location: Winter Haven, Florida
- Coordinates: 27.9825°N 81.6690°W
- Type: natural freshwater lake
- Basin countries: United States
- Max. length: 1,560 feet (480 m)
- Max. width: 1,260 feet (380 m)
- Surface area: 26.98 acres (11 ha)
- Surface elevation: 135 feet (41 m)

River Lake is a Y-shaped natural freshwater lake on the southeast side of Winter Haven, Florida. It has a 26.98-acre (109,200 m^{2}) surface area. This lake is as much a swamp as a lake, as at least half the surface area is covered with swampy vegetation. On the north and west residences line the lake's shore. On the southwest is a wooded area and on the south is a grove of citrus trees. To the east is a swampy area. Just east of the swampy area is a natural freshwater pond.

While there is no public access to this lake, the Hook and Bullet website says River Lake contains largemouth bass, bluegill and crappie.
