= Riggs Flat Lake =

Waterbody in Graham County. Arizona

- Location within Arizona
- Location: Graham County, Arizona, United States
- Coordinates: 32°42′28″N 109°57′58″W
- Type: Reservoir
- Basin countries: United States
- Surface area: 11 acres (4.5 ha)
- Average depth: 45 ft (14 m)
- Surface elevation: 9,000 ft (2,700 m)

Riggs Flat Lake is a reservoir located near the top of the Pinaleño Mountains, in the Coronado National Forest and Graham County, Arizona.

It is located 40 miles (64 km) southwest of Safford.

== Fish species ==
- Rainbow Trout
- Brown trout
