= Liscomb Lake Chain =

Lake chain in Nova Scotia

Coordinates: 45°14′33.5″N 62°27′40.2″W

Liscomb Lake Chain (Nova Scotia)

Liscomb Lake Chain is a glacial lake chain in Guysborough County, Nova Scotia, Canada. It consists of Big Liscomb Lake and Little Liscomb Lake. The nearest settlement to the lake chain is Caledonia. Liscomb Lake Chain is approximately 110.17 kilometres (68.46 mi) from Halifax and 66.33 kilometres (41.22 mi) from Truro. It is between Chisholm Lake and Rush Lake.

== Lakes ==
=== Big Liscomb Lake ===
As the name suggests, Big Liscomb Lake is the biggest lake in the lake chain. It is connected to Prince Arthur Lake, Hungry Lake, and Little Liscomb Lake by a small stream. It is approximately 3,033.17 metres (9,951.3 ft) in length and 2,124.5 kilometres (1,320.1 mi) in its widest point. The lake has 5 inlets and 1 outlets. Big Liscomb Lake has many islands, but all islands are unnamed.

=== Little Liscomb Lake ===
Little Liscomb Lake is the smallest lake in the lake chain. It is measured approximately 1,984.58 metres (6,511.1 ft) in length and 546.4 metres (1,793 ft) in width. It is only connected to Big Liscomb Lake by a small stream.
