= North Lake (Nova Scotia) =

Lake in Nova Scotia, Canada

- Location within Nova Scotia
- Location: Antigonish County, Nova Scotia
- Coordinates: 45.780298°N 61.917934°W
- Primary inflows: North Lake Stream
- Primary outflows: Georges Bay, Atlantic
- Basin countries: Canada

North Lake (Nova Scotia) is a lake of Antigonish County, Nova Scotia, Canada. It is fed by the North Lake stream and exits into George's Bay in the Atlantic Ocean.

== See also ==
- List of lakes in Nova Scotia
