= Springfield Lake =

- Location within Nova Scotia
- Location: Middle Sackville, Nova Scotia
- Coordinates: 44°48′47″N 63°44′17″W
- Catchment area: 4.98 km^{2} (1.92 sq mi)
- Basin countries: Canada
- Max. length: 1,832 m (6,010 ft)
- Max. width: 853 m (2,799 ft)
- Surface area: 90 ha (220 acres)
- Average depth: 3.2 m (10 ft)
- Max. depth: 4.6 m (15 ft)
- Water volume: 2.56×10^{6} m^{3} (2,080 acre⋅ft)
- Shore length^{1}: 5.6 km (3.5 mi)
- Surface elevation: 103 m (338 ft)
- ^{1} Shore length is not a well-defined measure.

Springfield Lake is a small lake located in Middle Sackville, Halifax Regional Municipality. The shoreline perimeter is 5.6 km, the mean depth is 3 m and the maximum depth is 5 m (Mandaville 2000). Springfield is a headwater lake that is fed solely by underground springs and runoff. Located in the Shubenacadie watershed, it ultimately feeds into the Bay of Fundy. It lies in pyretic slate bedrock that is high in hydrogen and sulphur (Kerekes et al. 1986). The shoreline is fully developed (lined by private homes and cottages) with over 530 houses in the 500 ha watershed. Homes on streets adjacent to the lake receive municipal sewage treatment. There is a HRM Water Pollution Control Plant (secondary sludge activation), constructed in 1987, that discharges effluent into a stream outflowing at the north end of the lake. There is a public beach at the northwestern end of the Lake.

== Details ==
- Average width: 431 m (1,414 ft)
- Basin permanence index: 0.46 m^{3}/km (0.97 cu yd/mi)
- Approximate flushing rate: 2.1 volumes per year
- Relative depth: 0.43%
- Shoreline development index: 1.70
- Volume development index: 2.1
- In-lake total phosphorus retention index: 0.7
