= Aylesford Lake =

Lake in Kings County, Nova Scotia, Canada

- Location in Nova Scotia
- Location: Kings County, Nova Scotia
- Coordinates: 44.941°N 64.664°W
- Type: Dystrophic
- Primary inflows: Lake George, Loon Lake
- Primary outflows: Gaspereau River
- Basin countries: Canada
- Max. length: 6.3 km (3.9 mi)
- Max. width: 1.9 km (1.2 mi)
- Surface area: 190 ha (470 acres)

Aylesford Lake is a natural, fresh-water, dystrophic lake located in Kings County, Nova Scotia, Canada, that is part of the Gaspereau Watershed. The lake encompasses approximately 190 hectares, and is surrounded by the South Mountain Rolling Plain area. Much of the lake is privately owned, making it a major recreational area for the Annapolis Valley.

Aylesford Lake offers a man-made public beach which opened in 1990 and features a boardwalk, parking lot, a public boat launch, boat docks, walking trails, canteen/concession area, male and female change houses, drinking water, clean portable washrooms, a grass open field and playgrounds. The lake is also home to the Aylesford Lake Yacht Club, and the Brigadoon Children's Camp, a non-profit recreational facility catering to children and youth living with a chronic illness, condition or special need in the Maritimes.
