= Forbes Lake (Pictou County) =

Lake in Nova Scotia, Canada

Coordinates: 45.497201°N 62.637773°W

Forbes Lake is a lake in Pictou County, Nova Scotia, Canada, at an elevation of about 90m. It was developed into a 72ha reservoir in 1912, and now supplies the towns of New Glasgow and Westville with water. The areas surrounding it are a provincially protected water area. The lake reaches a depth of 14m.
