= River Lake (Nova Scotia) =

River Lake (Nova Scotia) is the name of many lakes including the following:

== Halifax Regional Municipality ==
- River Lake located at 44°40′41″N 63°57′33″W
- River Lake located at 45°11′14″N 62°48′36″W
- River Lake located at 45°0′58″N 62°44′27″W

- River Lake located at 44°55′23″N 62°44′29″W
- River Lake located at 44°50′59″N 63°16′46″W
