= Little Lake (Nova Scotia) =

Little Lake (Nova Scotia) could mean the following :

== Lakes ==
=== Antigonish County ===
- Little Lake at 45°37′1″N 61°50′6″W
- Little Lake at 45°45′48″N 61°54′29″W

=== Cape Breton Regional Municipality ===
- Little Lake at 45°45′5″N 60°15′19″W
- Little Lake at 45°50′4″N 60°8′13″W
- Little Lake at 46°7′40″N 59°55′56″W

=== Colchester County ===
- Little Lake at 45°24′52″N 63°1′49″W
- Little Lake at 45°28′50″N 63°6′53″W
- Little Lake at 45°34′22″N 63°22′1″W

=== Cumberland County ===
- Little Lake at 45°45′25″N 64°0′44″W

=== Digby County ===
- Little Lake at 44°26′31″N 65°51′33″W
- Little Lake Doucette at 44°6′38″N 66°3′28″W

=== Guysborough County ===
- Little Lake at 45°11′35″N 61°22′23″W
- Little Lake at 45°8′39″N 61°55′35″W
- Little Lake at 45°20′10″N 61°38′52″W
- Little Lake at 45°19′35″N 61°22′25″W
- Little Lake at 45°13′29″N 61°33′45″W
- Little Lake at 45°14′45″N 61°20′42″W
- Little Lake at 45°13′38″N 61°6′30″W
- Little Lake at 45°13′5″N 61°58′17″W
- Little Lake at 45°20′35″N 61°19′49″W

=== Halifax Regional Municipality ===
- Little Lake at 44°30′45″N 63°33′2″W
- Long Lake at 44°29′48″N 63°43′18″W
- Little Lake at 44°33′17″N 63°54′10″W
- Little Lake at 44°47′43″N 63°0′3″W
- Little Lake at 44°47′6″N 63°2′17″W
- Little Lake at 44°47′25″N 62°46′39″W
- Little Lake at 44°45′38″N 63°54′49″W
- Little Lake at 44°45′41″N 63°10′32″W
- Little Lake at 44°46′30″N 63°2′47″W
- Little Lake at 44°43′17″N 63°37′14″W
- Little Lake at 44°41′58″N 63°11′42″W
- Little Lake at 44°40′6″N 63°56′10″W
- Little Lake at 44°39′8″N 63°19′31″W
- Little Lake at 44°45′19″N 63°26′26″W
- Little Lake at 44°44′42″N 63°15′56″W
- Little Lake at 44°44′30″N 63°5′26″W
- Little Lake at 45°9′41″N 62°41′31″W
- Little Lake at 45°3′10″N 63°2′15″W
- Little Lake at 44°53′59″N 62°33′1″W
- Little Lake at 44°48′25″N 63°41′53″W
- Little Lake at 44°47′59″N 63°9′8″W
- Little Lake at 45°14′48″N 62°40′22″W
- Little Lake at 44°50′50″N 63°25′52″W

=== Kings County ===
- Little Lake at 45°0′9″N 64°20′8″W
- Little Lake at 44°57′22″N 64°39′4″W

=== Pictou County ===
- Little Lake at 45°23′11″N 62°35′38″W

=== Region of Queens Municipality ===
- Little Lake at 43°58′44″N 64°57′40″W

=== Lunenburg County ===
- Little Lake at 44°26′24″N 64°29′8″W
- Little Lake at 44°21′55″N 64°33′48″W
- Little Lake at 44°32′34″N 64°3′17″W

=== Richmond County ===
- Little Lake at 45°43′26″N 60°51′16″W
- Little Lake at 45°43′39″N 60°16′32″W

=== Shelburne County ===
- Little Lake at 43°36′22″N 65°24′44″W
- Little Lake at 43°46′12″N 64°59′16″W

=== Victoria County ===
- Little Lake at 46°22′6″N 60°34′56″W

=== Yarmouth County ===
- Little Lake at 44°7′5″N 65°46′32″W
- Little Lake at 44°0′6″N 65°54′10″W
- Little Lake at 43°56′30″N 66°9′5″W

== Rivers ==
- Little Lake Brook in Region of Queens Municipality at 43°59′0″N 64°55′57″W
- Little Lake Brook in Kings County at 44°54′0″N 64°29′57″W
