= Beaver Lake (Halifax) =

Beaver Lake in Halifax, Nova Scotia may refer to one of the following lakes:

- Beaver Lake at 45°8′49″N 62°44′7″W
- Beaver Lake at 44°56′50″N 63°11′37″W
- Beaver Lake at 44°56′17″N 63°28′0″W
- Beaver Lake at 44°46′19″N 63°48′30″W
- Beaver Lake at 44°45′12″N 63°46′52″W

== See also ==
- Beaver Lake 17 a Mi'kmaq reserve in Halifax County
