= Flat Lake (Nova Scotia) =

Flat Lake (Nova Scotia) could refer to the following lakes:

== Antigonish County ==
- Flat Lake located at 45°26′8″N 61°52′47″W

== Halifax Regional Municipality ==
- Flat Lake a lake near the Burnside Industrial Park in Dartmouth at 44°43′15″N 63°35′51″W
- Flat Lake a lake near Stillwater Lake at44°42′10″N 63°51′5″W
- Flat Lake a lake near Upper Hammonds Plains at44°42′57″N 63°47′55″W
- Flat Lake a lake in Timberlea at 44°39′36″N 63°43′6″W
- Flat Lake a lake in Spryfield at 44°35′58″N 63°35′0″W
- Flat Lake a lake on the Chebucto Peninsula at 44°34′0″N 63°41′14″W
- Flat Lake a lake near Herring Cove 44°32′53″N 63°36′26″W
- 'Flat Lakes' a lakes in the Eastern Shore Area at 44°52′21″N 63°3′6″W

== Region of Queens Municipality ==
- Flat Lake a lake in the Kejimkujik National Park of Canada at 43°52′55″N 64°49′59″W

== Yarmouth County ==
- Flat Lake a lake at 44°2′25″N 65°39′41″W
