= Second Lake, Nova Scotia =

Second Lake (Nova Scotia) could mean the following

== Annapolis County ==
- Second Lake at 44°47′4″N 65°11′17″W
- Second Lake at 44°41′7″N 65°28′53″W

== Argyle ==
- Second Lake at 44°1′47″N 65°42′42″W
- Second Lake at 43°56′48″N 65°34′6″W
- Second Lake at 43°39′33″N 65°37′47″W

== Cape Breton Regional Municipality ==
- Second Lake at 46°0′2″N 59°52′8″W

== Municipality of Clare ==
- Second Lake at 44°22′53″N 65°44′43″W

== Municipality of the District of Chester ==
- Second Lake at 44°38′42″N 64°19′22″W

== Municipality of the District of Guysborough ==
- Second Lake at 45°15′56″N 61°19′7″W
- Second Lake at 45°14′57″N 61°20′39″W
- Second Lake at 45°12′6″N 61°26′24″W

== Halifax Regional Municipality ==
- Second Lake at 45°0′10″N 62°17′12″W
- Second Lake at 44°56′34″N 62°21′2″W
- Second Lake at 44°52′7″N 62°37′49″W
- Second Lake at 44°49′40″N 62°42′15″W
- Second Lake at 44°47′41″N 62°55′44″W
- Second Lake at 44°46′54″N 63°39′4″W
- Second Lake at 44°43′6″N 63°46′30″W
- Second Lake at 44°30′18″N 63°54′42″W
- Second Lake at 44°50′26″N 62°39′19″W

== Inverness County ==
- Second Lake O'Law at 46°15′27″N 60°57′16″W

== Region of Queens Municipality ==
- Second Lake at 44°3′47″N 65°1′38″W
- Second Lake at 44°6′44″N 65°5′47″W

== Richmond County ==
- Second Lake at 45°39′49″N 60°45′23″W
- Second Lake at 45°38′37″N 61°1′36″W

== Municipality of the District of Staint Mary's ==
- Second Lake at 45°8′36″N 61°53′58″W
- Second Lake at 45°8′30″N 61°57′27″W
- Second Lake at 45°6′22″N 62°6′28″W
- Second Lake at 45°2′15″N 62°3′20″W

== Municipality of the District of Yarmouth ==
- Second Lake at 43°52′14″N 66°6′33″W

== Rivers ==
- Second Lake Brook in the Halifax Regional Municipality at 44°42′0″N 63°46′57″W
