= Amalgamation of the Halifax Regional Municipality =

Map of Halifax showing its 4 predecessor municipalities

The current municipal boundaries of Halifax, Nova Scotia, Canada, were formed on April 1 1996, when four pre-existing municipalities amalgamated to form the Halifax Regional Municipality.

== First amalgamation ==
The current boundaries of Halifax County were established in 1908. Owing to the need for a more efficient county-wide government, the Municipality of the County of Halifax was incorporated in 1962, including all areas in the county outside of the cities of Halifax and Dartmouth. The City of Halifax gradually grew to occupy the entire Halifax Peninsula by the end of World War II. The late 1960s was a period of significant change and expansion of the city when surrounding areas of Halifax County were amalgamated into Halifax: Rockingham, Clayton Park, Fairview, Armdale, and Spryfield were all added in 1969.

The biggest change to Dartmouth came in 1955 when the Angus L. MacDonald Bridge opened, connecting Dartmouth to Halifax. Unprecedented suburban growth led In 1961 the communities of Woodlawn, Woodside and Westphal along with the area of the town of Dartmouth joined together to become the "City Of Dartmouth" the city was the third largest city in Nova Scotia, after Halifax and Sydney. The A. Murray MacKay Bridge opened in 1970, furthering growth and leading to the economic integration of what many were terming Nova Scotia's "twin cities".

Bedford was organized as an unincorporated rural community in 1921 and underwent rapid suburban growth during the post-war years. One of the largest unincorporated municipalities in Nova Scotia by the 1970s, Bedford incorporated as the Town of Bedford in 1980.

== Second amalgamation ==
=== Precursor to amalgamation ===
In 1993, the Progressive Conservative provincial government of Nova Scotia began to consider merging the cities of Halifax and Dartmouth with the town of Bedford and Halifax County. Halifax, Dartmouth and Bedford were relatively densely populated while Halifax County was largely rural with large areas of wilderness. Amalgamating these regions had been proposed as far back as 1974.

Bill Hayward, a consultant, was hired by the government of Premier Don Cameron to prepare a report on the potential savings resulting from the merger of municipalities in Halifax County and Cape Breton County. Before the report was completed, Cameron's party was defeated in a provincial general election and a former mayor of Dartmouth, John Savage, won the election.

Savage had previously declared his opposition to regional amalgamations, but he relented and his administration backed the creation of the Cape Breton Regional Municipality in August 1995 to solve a funding and demographic short-fall facing several communities in Cape Breton County. The merger was controversial but appeared to achieve the predicted economic goals in the short-term so Savage's government opted to proceed with the Halifax County merger; Bill Hayward was retained to oversee the process on behalf of the government.

Hayward's report had predicted that a regional amalgamation in Halifax County would save over $20 million annually, through reductions in duplicate services and by eliminating duplicate high-level administrative positions for the population of 350,000. Many residents in Halifax County municipalities were against the merger with rural areas tending to generate the most opposition; those residents feared that they would be forced to pay higher taxes and follow urban standards without receiving a higher level of municipal services.

Hayward's predicted cost savings were widely criticized as unrealistic, with many feeling that he had arbitrarily determined the figures. Politicians were equally divided on the merger, as many saw the influence of their local constituencies being reduced in a larger municipality, which would be dominated by the former cities of Halifax and Dartmouth.

The actual public debate over the planned amalgamation was fairly muted, with a few sparsely-attended public information sessions and some discussion in various media. The prevailing attitude among residents and outside observers was that amalgamation would be inevitable and could not be stopped. The New Democratic Party called unsuccessfully for a plebiscite on the matter.

=== Incorporation ===
In 1995, an Act to Incorporate the Halifax Regional Municipality received Royal Assent in the provincial legislature and the Halifax Regional Municipality was established on April 1, 1996, the same day all former municipalities were dissolved.

In 1996 the provincial government amalgamated all municipal governments within Halifax County to create HRM, a regional municipality comprising approximately 200 individual communities or placenames for civic addressing grouped into eighteen planning areas for zoning purposes.

It is one of the newest municipalities in the Canadian province of Nova Scotia, in terms of incorporation.

It was formed on April 1, 1996, by dissolving and amalgamating the following municipalities:

- City of Halifax
- City of Dartmouth
- Town of Bedford
- Municipality of the County of Halifax

All municipal services and staff were merged into the new municipal unit. The awkward name of the municipality was quickly shortened by media, residents and politicians to the informal "HRM," which is commonly heard.

With the creation of HRM, the Municipality of the County of Halifax was officially dissolved, however the geographic division of Halifax County continues to exist and the boundaries of HRM are contiguous with the county, except for several First Nations reserves. The provincial government designated the area occupied by the former Cities of Halifax and Dartmouth as the Halifax Metropolitan Area, and the area occupied by the former Town of Bedford as the Bedford (Urban Community).

=== Aftermath of amalgamation ===
Several problems with the amalgamation were noted, with the most obvious being that many of the predicted cost savings did not materialize. Some savings to be achieved by eliminating duplicate jobs were offset by the fact that staff from rural areas now demanded to paid at the same rate as their urban counterparts, forcing the cost for amalgamation to double from initial estimates.

Small scandals such as the purchase of $1,000 chairs for the new Halifax Regional Council cast a negative light on the process, and unflattering articles in the national media portrayed the Halifax amalgamation as an example of how not to merge municipalities. Halifax was repeatedly referenced as a scenario to avoid when the Government of Ontario was looking at amalgamating municipalities in the Greater Toronto Area during the late 1990s.

Since amalgamation, the municipality has experienced dramatic growth and prosperity, mainly resulting from HRM benefiting from a much-delayed urban growth in Atlantic Canada – this being one of the last regions in North America to urbanize. Critics have pointed out that the majority of economic development has benefited the former cities of Halifax and Dartmouth, with many rural areas of HRM continuing to experience economic stagnation and decline.

The term Haligonian refers specifically to residents of the former City of Halifax. Since amalgamation, there have been attempts to apply the term more broadly to all residents of HRM, but most citizens in Dartmouth, Bedford and other communities in the municipality tend to avoid its use. Despite amalgamation, residents of the municipality and maps and Canada Post still refer to the names of the pre-amalgamation municipalities to describe the geographic area and when referring to their specific groupings of citizens.

In 2004, there was some discussion in the Eastern Shore area of applying to the province of Nova Scotia to form their own municipality because of the perceived lack of services to and representation from that part of HRM.
