= Crichton Park, Nova Scotia =

Crichton Park
- neighbourhood
- Location within Nova Scotia
- Coordinates: 44°40′52″N 63°34′3.1″W
- Country: Canada
- Province: Nova Scotia
- Municipality: Halifax Regional Municipality
- Community: Dartmouth
- Community council: Harbour East - Marine Drive Community Council

Area
  - Total: 1.31 km^{2} (0.51 sq mi)
- Telephone Exchanges: 902
- GNBC code: CAIKQ

Crichton Park is a residential neighbourhood in the Dartmouth area of the Halifax Regional Municipality, Nova Scotia. It is located in the north end of Dartmouth close to the MacDonald and MacKay bridges, Brightwood Golf and Country Club, Mic Mac Mall and Lake Banook. Crichton Park is home to Crichton Park Elementary school.

In January 2004, Crichton Park became the first residential area to receive natural gas service in Nova Scotia. Prior to that date, Nova Scotia relied on petroleum, coal, hydro, and wood.
