= Nantucket, Nova Scotia =

Nantucket
- Neighborhood
- Location within Nova Scotia
- Coordinates: 44°40′21.67″N 63°31′4.36″W
- Country: Canada
- Province: Nova Scotia
- Municipality: Halifax Regional Municipality
- Community: Dartmouth
- Community council: Harbour East - Marine Drive Community Council
- District: 6 - Harbourview - Burnside - Dartmouth East
- Postal code: B2W
- Area code: 902

Nantucket is an upper middle income residential neighborhood in the Woodlawn area in the community of Dartmouth within the Halifax Regional Municipality Nova Scotia. The area was built in early 1970s across Portland Street (Route 207) from Portland Estates. It was named after the Nantucket Whaling Company which was once situated on Halifax Harbour. There is an historic home, the Quaker House, built 1785 at 57 Ochterloney Street in the neighborhood.
