= Portland Hills, Nova Scotia =

Portland Hills
- Subdivision
- Location within Nova Scotia
- Coordinates: 44°39′50.80″N 63°30′37.39″W
- Country: Canada
- Province: Nova Scotia
- Municipality: Halifax Regional Municipality
- Community: Dartmouth
- Community council: Harbour East - Marine Drive Community Council
- District: 3 - Dartmouth South - Eastern Passage

Area
  - Total: 1.33 km^{2} (0.51 sq mi)
- Postal code: B2W
- Area code: 902

Portland Hills is a subdivision in Dartmouth, Nova Scotia, part of the Halifax Regional Municipality. Located east of Morris Lake and Portland Estates, it was formed in 2001 to 2008 as an extension of the community of Portland Estates along Portland Street (Route 207). The neighbourhood is home to the Portland Hills Centre. Birches Park runs through the area, which includes the 2.2-kilometre (1.4 mi) Portland Hills Greenway trail.

== Geography ==
Portland Hills is about 6 km (3.7 mi) from Downtown Dartmouth and has a landmass that isapproximately 133 ha (330 acres).

== Transportation ==
Portland Hills Terminal, at the corner of Portland Street and Portland Hills Drive, is a hub for Halifax Transit bus services.

== Schools ==
- Elementary (grades primary to 6) - Portland Estates Elementary School
- Junior High (grades 7-9) -- Ellenvale Junior High School
- High Schools (grades 10-12)
  - English, with optional International Baccalaureate (IB) Diploma program - Prince Andrew High School
  - French Immersion - Dartmouth High School
  - French Immersion International Baccalaureate - Cole Harbour District High School
