= Shannon Park, Nova Scotia =

Shannon Park
- Neighbourhood
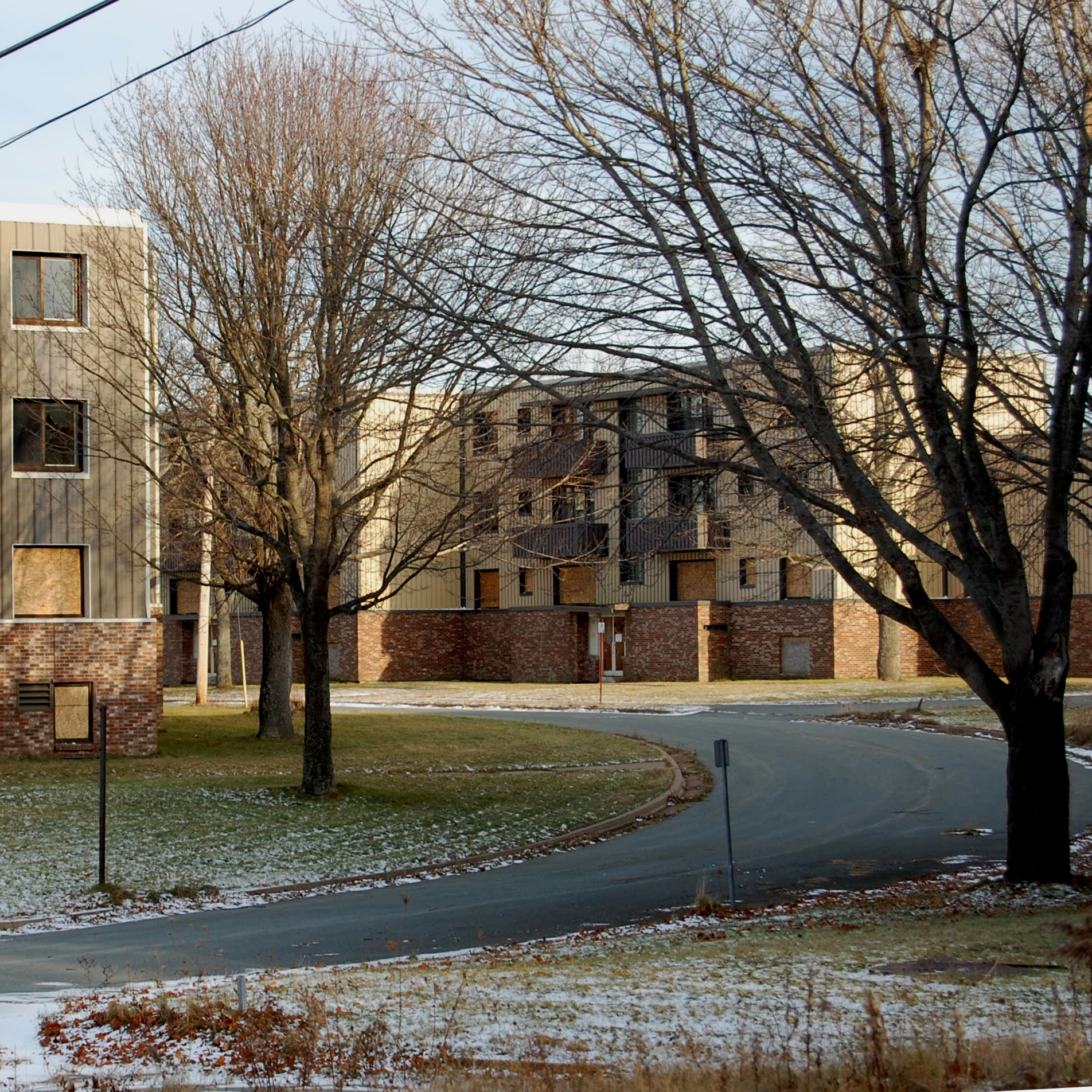
- Shannon Park in 2008

- Location within Nova Scotia
- Coordinates: 44°40′50″N 63°36′15″W
- Country: Canada
- Province: Nova Scotia
- Municipality: Halifax Regional Municipality
- Community: Dartmouth
- Community council: Harbour East - Marine Drive Community Council
- District: 6 - Harbourview - Burnside - Dartmouth East

Area
  - Total: 34.8 ha (86 acres)
- Postal code: B3A
- Area code: 902
- GNBC code: CBIFY

Shannon Park is an urban neighbourhood and former national defence site in the north end of Dartmouth on the eastern shore of Halifax Harbour in the Halifax Regional Municipality (HRM) in Nova Scotia, Canada. It is immediately south of the A. Murray MacKay Bridge in the community of Dartmouth. It straddles Highway 111, a CN Rail freight line, and Halifax Harbour. It is bordered on the south by Tuft's Cove.

== History ==
Shannon Park, along with the adjacent former national defence site of Wallis Heights, housed the families of personnel serving with the Royal Canadian Navy. It was built in the 1950s to remedy the shortage of housing which plagued sailors and their families in Halifax during World War Two. The community was named after HMS Shannon, the Halifax-based frigate which won a notable victory in the War of 1812.

With defence cutbacks reducing the number of personnel serving in the navy and expanded housing available on the civilian market, Shannon Park and Wallis Heights were closed in 2004 and remaining residents were moved to military housing at Willow Park.

All buildings have been demolished as of 2018.

Immediately north of the neighbourhood on the Bedford basin adjacent to the MacKay bridge lies the Bedford Institute of Oceanography, a Canadian Coast Guard communication centre, and a Canadian Food Inspection Agency laboratory.

Until the HRM withdrew its bid for the 2014 Commonwealth Games, urban planners envisioned Shannon Park to be used for locating the proposed sports stadium, athletes' village and several additional venues. Disposal of the land is being negotiated between National Defence and the Canada Lands Company crown corporation. Mi'kmaq from the Millbrook Reserve near Truro have applied for a portion of the land. Shannon Park now has a French immersion school.

Although unused, Shannon Park remains part of CFB Halifax. The Department of National Defence disposed of Shannon Park in three pieces.

== Present ==
In 2014, the Canada Lands Company (CLC) bought approximately 34.8 ha (86 acres) of land, at a cost of $4 million. Also in 2014, the CLC bought 1.89 ha (4.7 acres) of land that includes an elementary school, at a cost of $313,000.

Another approximately 3.6 ha (8.9 acres) was transferred to Indigenous Services Canada, to then be transferred to Millbrook First Nation. The Millbrook First Nation has an outstanding land claim on a portion known as Turtle Cove, which was the site of a former Mi'kmaq settlement.

A stadium for the Atlantic Schooners, the proposed Canadian Football League franchise, has been discussed as a location.

As of 16 May 2021, there are plans to develop the 34.8 ha (86 acres) of land to eventually have 3,000 residential units.

== Transportation ==
Shannon Park can be reached by Halifax Transit bus route "51 Windmill", which connects to the Bridge Terminal. In the past, route 51 travelled into Shannon Park (via Nootka Avenue), but buses now stop on Windmill Road only.

The municipal government's Rapid Transit Strategy (adopted in 2020) proposes to establish a new ferry route connecting Shannon Park to downtown Halifax.
