= Morris Lake (Nova Scotia) =

Lake in Nova Scotia, Canada

- Location within Nova Scotia
- Location: Halifax Regional Municipality, Nova Scotia
- Coordinates: 44°39′19″N 63°30′01″W
- Type: Eutrophic
- Primary inflows: Russell Lake Bell Lake, Ellenvale Brook, Lamont Lake
- Primary outflows: Cow Bay River
- Catchment area: 17.495 km^{2} (6.755 sq mi)
- Basin countries: Canada
- Max. length: 3.55 km (2.21 mi)
- Max. width: 0.83 km (0.52 mi)
- Surface area: 6.4 km^{2} (2.5 sq mi)
- Average depth: 3.7 m (12 ft)
- Max. depth: 13 m (43 ft)
- Water volume: 5,920,000 m^{3} (4,800 acre⋅ft)
- Residence time: 4.1 months
- Shore length^{1}: 10.1 km (6.3 mi)
- Surface elevation: 28 m (92 ft)
- Frozen: 2 months
- Islands: 4
- Settlements: Dartmouth, Shearwater, Cole Harbour
- ^{1} Shore length is not a well-defined measure.

Morris Lake is the longest and deepest lake in Dartmouth, Nova Scotia's Halifax Regional Municipality, reaching a maximum depth of 15 metres (49 ft), with a typical depth of 4 to 8 metres (13 to 26 ft) throughout. It borders the communities of Dartmouth, Shearwater and Cole Harbour.

The lake is bounded by Shearwater and Portland Estates on the west, Cole Harbour on the east and south, and Portland Hills on the north. The shoreline is mostly developed on the northwest end. The closed Dartmouth Refinery on the shore of Halifax Harbour once drew water from the lake for cooling. CFB Shearwater also uses a portion of the lake for helicopter practice manoeuvres and it also maintains a small recreational beach.

== Recreational areas ==
- Macdonalds Beach CFB Shearwater
- Portland Lakes Greenway
- Kiwanis Park Beach

== Other lakes of the same name in Nova Scotia ==
- Guysborough County at 45°4′30″N 62°18′31″W
