= CJHS =

CJHS may refer to:

- Caledonia Junior High School
- Chicagoland Jewish High School, now Rochelle Zell Jewish High School
- Cornwallis Junior High School
- Carl Junction High School
- Churchill Junior High School
