= Nick Eh 30 =

Canadian streamer and YouTuber (born 1995)

- Nick Eh 30's channel icon
- Born: Nicholas Amyoony; March 14, 1995 (age 31); Halifax, Nova Scotia, Canada
- Education: Dalhousie University (dropped out)
- Occupations: Live streamer; YouTuber

Instagram information
- Page: Nick Eh 30
- Years active: 2015–present
- Followers: 3.6 million

TikTok information
- Page: Nick Eh 30
- Years active: 2019–present
- Followers: 7.4 million

Twitch information
- Channel: NickEh30
- Years active: 2019–present
- Genre: Gaming
- Game: Fortnite
- Followers: 5.8 million

X information
- Handle: @NickEh30
- Display name: Nick Eh 30
- Years active: 2014–present
- Followers: 1.7 million

YouTube information
- Channels: Nick Eh 30; Nick Eh 30 Shorts; Nick Eh 30 VODs
- Years active: 2014–present
- Genre: Gaming
- Subscribers: 8.76 million (main channel); 4.39 million (Nick Eh 30 Shorts); 184 thousand (Nick Eh 30 VODs)
- Views: 1.6 billion (main channel); 3.8 billion (Nick Eh 30 Shorts); 1.2 million (Nick Eh 30 VODs)
- Last updated: 29 August 2026

Nicholas Amyoony (born March 14, 1995), known online as Nick Eh 30, is a Canadian online streamer, YouTuber and professional gamer. Amyoony began making gaming videos as a student at Dalhousie University, and later dropped out to pursue his gaming and streaming career as he received online success while starting to play Fortnite Battle Royale in late 2017. Amyoony is particularly known for being family-friendly.

== Early life ==
Nicholas Amyoony was born on March 14, 1995 and is of Lebanese Canadian descent. He was raised in Halifax, Nova Scotia and became interested in video games at a young age, particularly The Last of Us. He attended Prince Andrew High School in Dartmouth, Nova Scotia. During his high school years, Amyoony received high grades while actively participating in taekwondo, guitar lessons, and football. With aspirations to become a doctor, Amyoony dedicated much of his time focusing on his studies, leading him to give up extracurricular activities and spending time with his friends. Whenever he needed a break, Amyoony would play on his PlayStation 3. His name "Nick Eh 30" comes from "Nick" being a part of his name, the "Eh" originating from the first letter of his last name, A, as a nod to the Canadian "Eh" stereotype, and the "30" coming from his high school football jersey number.

== Career ==
Amyoony launched his "Nick Eh 30" YouTube channel in December 2014, although he started earlier under a different channel. He initially created gaming videos primarily focused on The Last of Us, while also exploring other titles such as Uncharted 4 and Resident Evil 7. His father, who now serves as his manager, granted Amyoony one year to pursue his gaming career. In March 2016, he received a shout-out from PewDiePie. The following year, in 2017, he started streaming professionally and began playing Fortnite in December. Despite previously studying for his Bachelor of Science at Dalhousie University, Amyoony decided to drop out and pursue his gaming career full-time. In 2018, Amyoony, as well as Facebook gaming streamer StoneMountain64, signed with the Creative Artists Agency (CAA).

Starting from September 1, 2019, Amyoony, as a Fortnite streamer, made the switch from livestreaming on YouTube to Twitch, as a result of his signing onto the platform. While being a popular YouTube streamer at that time, Amyoony continued to create videos on the platform. Subsequently, he earned a spot on the Forbes 30 Under 30 Games category for the 2020 list. On November 11, 2020, Amyoony signed with Luminosity Gaming, as announced during the Enthusiast Gaming Live Expo. Later on, he parted ways with the organization on August 29, 2022. On November 22, 2020, Amyoony partnered with Epic Games to host his own Fortnite tournament titled the "Nick Eh 30 Cup". In 2023, he joined forces with Mainframe Studios to produce Endurathon, an animated series created in Unreal Engine 5. In August 2023, Amyoony hosted a $50,000 Fortnite Twitch Rivals tournament.

Amyoony, who is particularly well-known for being family-friendly, currently lives with his parents in Halifax, who both assist him in his streaming career. Unlike with most online creators, he actively includes his parents to participate in his online content and career. In a 2018 video, Amyoony unboxed his 1 million YouTube Play Button alongside his parents. Amyoony also has a brother, who has also assisted with work surrounding his online content.

On June 11, 2024, Fortnite released a purchasable outfit depicting Amyoony.

== Awards and nominations ==
Year	Award	Category	Result	Ref.
2020	Forbes 30 Under 30	Games	Included	

== See also ==
- List of most-followed Twitch channels
