= Westphal, Nova Scotia =

Community in Nova Scotia, Canada

Westphal
- Locality
- Interactive map of Westphal
- Location within Nova Scotia
- Coordinates: 44°41′08″N 63°32′29″W
- Country: Canada
- Province: Nova Scotia
- Municipality: Halifax Regional Municipality
- Community: Dartmouth
- Community council: Harbour East - Marine Drive Community Council
- District: 6 - Harbourview - Burnside - Dartmouth East
- Postal code: B2W
- Area code: 902, 782
- GNBC code: CBOIS

Westphal
- Community
- Interactive map of Westphal
- Country: Canada
- Province: Nova Scotia
- Municipality: Halifax Regional Municipality
- Community council: Harbour East - Marine Drive Community Council
- District: 4 - Cole Harbour - Westphal
- Telephone Exchanges: 902, 782

Westphal is an unincorporated community located in and adjacent to Dartmouth, Nova Scotia. Some of Westphal is considered part of Dartmouth, while some of it is considered separate from Dartmouth. The area is bound by Port Wallace in the north, Waverley Road (Route 318) in the west, Lake Major Road in the east, and Main Street (Trunk 7) in the south. The area also includes the watershed and water filtration plant for the Halifax Regional Water Commission that supplies drinking water for the residents of Dartmouth and surrounding communities east of Halifax Harbour.

== History ==
Westphal was originally settled by farmers in the late 1700s. Its original name was Preston Road. In 1935, the Women's Institute petitioned to rename the area after George and Philip Westphal, two brothers born near Salmon River who eventually became Royal Navy admirals and who returned to the area from time to time.

Like Woodlawn, Westphal was mostly a rural community until the building boom of the late 1940s and 1950s. St. Luke's Anglican Church began in 1948 to accommodate the growing population, originally running out of a poultry house owned by Peter Dooks on Tacoma Drive. It then moved to Admiral Westphal Elementary School for two years, before a dedicated church building was built in 1954. St. Thomas More Church was established in the early 1950s, originally near the juncture of Waverley Road and the Eastern Shore highway. After the provincial government acquired the land to build a new highway, the church moved to the corner of Main Street and Caledonia Road, where it remains today. Stevens Road United Baptist Church started in 1956, originally under the name of Westphal Mission Baptist Church. The current building was built in 1959.

== Area neighbourhoods ==
- Tam O'Shanter Ridge

== Schools ==
- Elementary
  - Admiral Westphal Elementary School
  - Ian Forsyth Elementary School
- Junior High
  - Caledonia Junior High School
- High School
  - Auburn Drive High School
