= Manor Park =

Manor Park may refer to:

== Canada ==
- Manor Park, Nova Scotia, a neighbourhood in Dartmouth
- Manor Park, Ottawa, a neighbourhood in Ottawa

== New Zealand ==
- Manor Park, New Zealand, a suburb of Lower Hutt

== United Kingdom ==
- Manor Park, London
  - Manor Park (ward)
- Manor Park, Sutton
- Manor Park, a park in Hither Green, London
- Manor Park, an area in Manor, South Yorkshire, part of Sheffield
- Manor Park, Nuneaton, a football stadium in Warwickshire
- Manor Park Country Park, in Kent

== United States ==
- Manor Park, Larchmont, in New York
- Manor Park, Washington, D.C., a neighborhood
