= Tam O'Shanter Ridge =

- Neighbourhood
- Interactive map of Tam O'Shanter Ridge
- Location within Nova Scotia
- Coordinates: 44°41′21″N 63°31′37″W
- Country: Canada
- Province: Nova Scotia
- Municipality: Halifax Regional Municipality
- Community: Dartmouth
- Community council: Harbour East - Marine Drive Community Council
- District: 6 - Harbourview - Burnside - Dartmouth East
- Postal code: B2W
- Area code: 902
- GNBC code: CBLID

Tam O'Shanter Ridge is a mostly residential neighbourhood in the Dartmouth area of Halifax Regional Municipality, Nova Scotia. It is located in the east end of Dartmouth on the outer fringe of Westphal, north of Commodore Park.

== History ==
Tam O'Shanter Ridge was established as a subdivision in 1960 by the Commodore Development Company, with houses ready for occupancy by 1961.
