= Mary Lawson =

Mary Lawson may refer to:

- Mary Lawson (novelist) (born 1946), Canadian novelist
- Mary Lawson (actress) (1910–1941), British actress
- Mary Lawson (baseball) (1924–1997)
- Mary Camilla Lawson (1865–?), British politician
- Mary Gloria Lawson, Louisiana's first African American female lawyer
- Mary Lawson Elementary in Grahams Corner, Nova Scotia

== See also ==
- Maria Lawson (disambiguation)
