= Southdale, Nova Scotia =

Southdale
- Neighbourhood
- Location within Nova Scotia
- Coordinates: 44°39′58″N 63°32′29″W
- Country: Canada
- Province: Nova Scotia
- Municipality: Halifax Regional Municipality
- Community: Dartmouth
- Community council: Harbour East - Marine Drive Community Council
- District: 5 - Dartmouth Centre
- Postal code: B2Y
- Area code: 902
- GNBC: CBJOA

Southdale is a neighbourhood located between the neighbourhoods of Woodside and Manor Park in the community of Dartmouth, in the Halifax Regional Municipality, Nova Scotia. The primary street is Portland Street which forms part of Route 207. A small lake called Maynard Lake is located within the neighbourhood .

== Schools ==
- Dartmouth South Academy
