= Scott Cameron =

Scott Cameron may refer to:

- Scott Cameron (cricketer) (born 1996), Scottish cricketer
- Scott Cameron (swimmer) (born 1976), Olympic swimmer from New Zealand
- Scotty Cameron (born 1962), American golf club maker
- Scotty Cameron (ice hockey) (1921–1993), Canadian ice hockey player
- Scott Frederick Cameron, Canadian Surgeon General
