= Caledonia Junior High School =

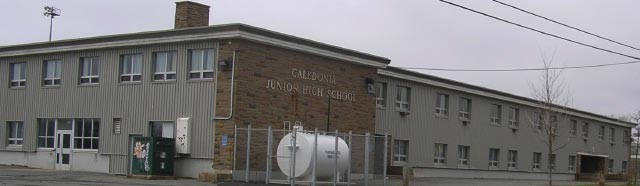

Location
- 38 Caledonia Road; Dartmouth, Nova Scotia, B2X 1B5; Canada; 44°41′11.9″N 63°31′50.8″W

Information
- School type: Junior High School
- Motto: "Follow Our Pride"
- Founded: 1963
- School board: Halifax Regional School Board
- School number: HRSB ID 119
- Principal: Gary Miller
- Vice Principal: Audrey Davison
- Grades: 7-9
- Enrollment: 312 (September 2011)
- Language: English, French immersion
- Colours: Black & Yellow
- Mascot: Wolf
- Team name: Caledonia Wolves
- Feeder schools: Ian Forsyth Elementary School; Michael Wallace Elementary School; Admiral Westphal Elementary School
- Website: caledonia.ednet.ns.ca
- Last updated: September 18, 2011

Caledonia Junior High School is a Canadian public school in Dartmouth, Nova Scotia. It is operated by the Halifax Regional Centre for Education (HRCE). The school opened in 1963.

Caledonia Junior High offers the grade 7 late entry French immersion program. After grade 9 students will continue their studies at Prince Andrew High School, or at Dartmouth High School if they wish to continue Late French Immersion.

The school takes students from Ian Forsyth Elementary School, Michael Wallace Elementary School and Admiral Westphal Elementary School.
