= Wallis Heights, Nova Scotia =

Wallis Heights
- Subdivision
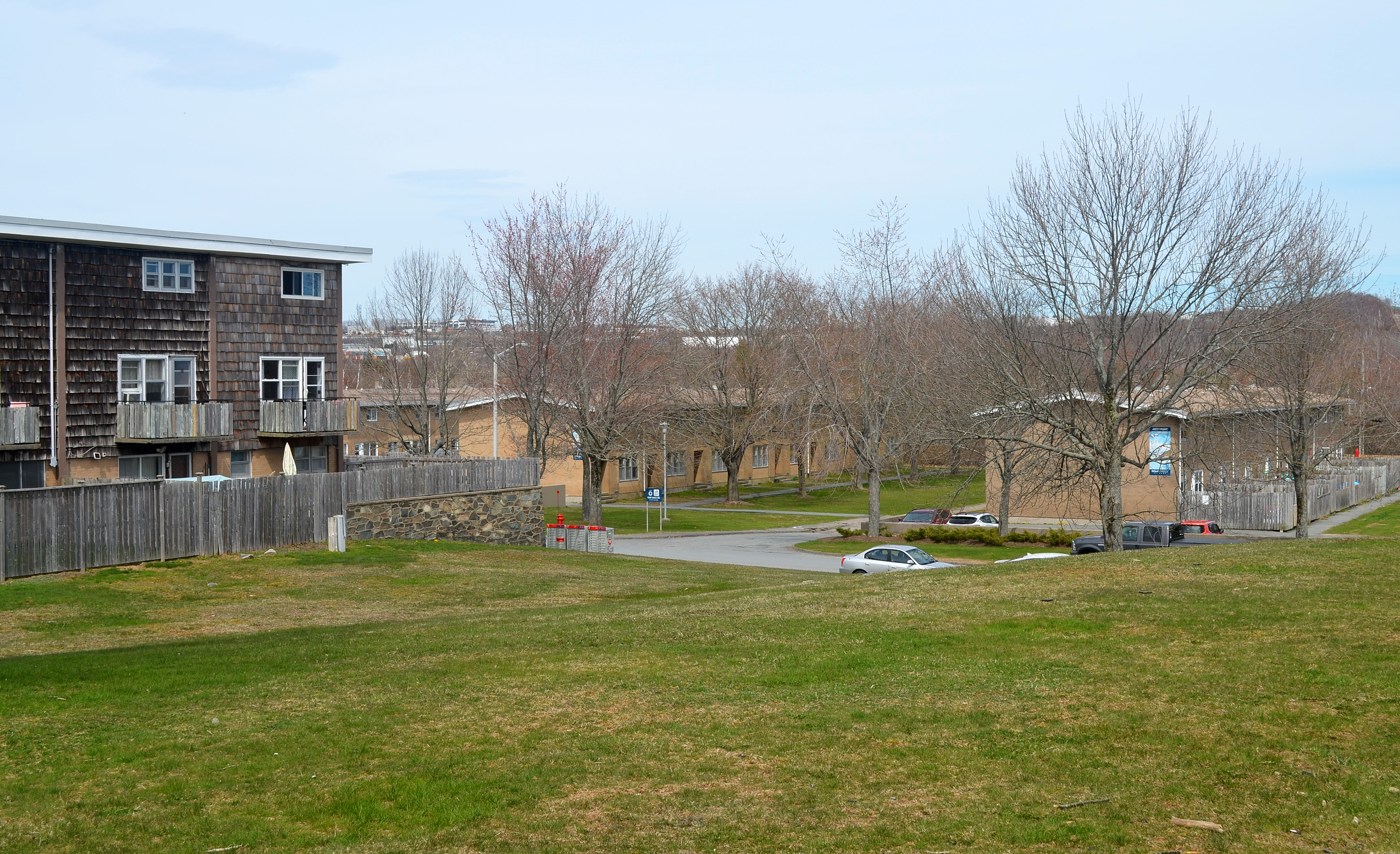

- Location within Nova Scotia
- Coordinates: 44°41′11″N 63°36′22″W
- Country: Canada
- Province: Nova Scotia
- Municipality: Halifax Regional Municipality
- Community: Dartmouth
- Community council: Harbour East - Marine Drive Community Council
- District: 6 - Harbourview - Burnside - Dartmouth East
- Postal code: B3A
- Area code: 902
- GNBC code: CBNJH

Wallis Heights is a Canadian urban neighbourhood in Nova Scotia's Halifax Regional Municipality.

Wallis Heights is situated immediately north of Shannon Hill at the Northeastern end of the Bedford Basin, around the northern side of the A. Murray MacKay Bridge, also known as 'the new bridge', in the former city of Dartmouth. It was established by the Department of National Defence in 1963 to house Royal Canadian Navy personnel attached to the Halifax naval base. The community is named after Provo Wallis.

Defence cutbacks to the Canadian Forces budget in the mid-1990s coupled with rising real estate maintenance costs saw DND not renewing the 30 year lease on the property. Wallis Heights was then sold to a private developer. Some units have been renovated and the entire neighbourhood has been resettled by civilians. It is now called Ocean Breeze Estates.

== Bedford Institute of Oceanography and Canadian Coast Guard Station ==
On the opposite side of Hudson Way is the Bedford Institute of Oceanography opened in 1962.

Canadian Coast Guard Base Dartmouth supports berthing for larger ship of the CCG Atlantic Region and search and rescue base (supported by CCGS Corporal Teather C.V. and CCGS G. Peddle S.C.).

== Transportation ==
Wallis Heights is served by a public bus route, Halifax Transit route 51. It runs seven days a week, linking Wallis Heights to the Bridge Terminal via Windmill Road.
