= Ellenvale, Nova Scotia =

Ellenvale
- Neighbourhood
- Interactive map of Ellenvale
- Location within Nova Scotia
- Coordinates: 44°40′37″N 63°31′24″W
- Country: Canada
- Province: Nova Scotia
- Municipality: Halifax Regional Municipality
- Community: Dartmouth
- Community council: Harbour East - Marine Drive Community Council
- District: 6 - Harbourview - Burnside - Dartmouth East

Area
  - Total: 0.81 km^{2} (0.31 sq mi)
- Postal code: B2W
- Area code: 902
- GNBC code: CALFE

Ellenvale is a mostly residential neighbourhood in the Dartmouth area of Halifax Regional Municipality, Nova Scotia. It is located in the east end of Dartmouth in the Woodlawn area.

== History ==
Along with other residential subdivisions in the Woodlawn area, the Ellenvale subdivision was established in the mid-1950s. By 1955, 400 building lots had been set aside.

In 1967, Ellenvale Junior High School was established, followed by Brookhouse Elementary School in the subsequent year.

== Geography ==
Ellenvale is a relatively small neighbourhood of 81 ha (200 acres).

== Schools ==
- Brookhouse Elementary School
- Ellenvale Junior High School
