= Bel Ayr Park, Nova Scotia =

Bel Ayr Park
- Neighbourhood
- Interactive map of Bel Ayr Park
- Location within Nova Scotia
- Coordinates: 44°40′32″N 63°30′20″W
- Country: Canada
- Province: Nova Scotia
- Municipality: Halifax Regional Municipality
- Community: Dartmouth
- Community council: Harbour East - Marine Drive Community Council
- District: 3 - Dartmouth South - Eastern Passage
- Postal code: B2W
- Area code: 902
- GNBC code: CACOA

Bel Ayr Park is a mostly residential neighbourhood in the Dartmouth community of Halifax Regional Municipality, Nova Scotia, Canada. It is located in the east end of Dartmouth in the Woodlawn area. The houses in this area mostly made of brick.
