= Commodore Park, Nova Scotia =

Commodore Park
- Neighbourhood
- Interactive map of Commodore Park
- Location within Nova Scotia
- Coordinates: 44°40′49″N 63°31′48″W
- Country: Canada
- Province: Nova Scotia
- Municipality: Halifax Regional Municipality
- Community: Dartmouth
- Community council: Harbour East - Marine Drive Community Council
- District: 6 - Harbourview - Burnside - Dartmouth East
- Postal code: B2W
- Area code: 902, 782
- GNBC code: CAHPX

Commodore Park is a mostly residential neighbourhood in the Dartmouth community of the Halifax Regional Municipality, Nova Scotia. It is located in the east end of Dartmouth in the Woodlawn area. Prince Andrew High School is located within this area.

== History ==
Commodore Park was established as a subdivision during the general housing boom in Dartmouth in the 1950s. By 1955, 200 building lots had been set aside and 50 houses had been built. The subdivision was developed by Commodore Company Limited. The land comprising the area was originally owned by various landowners, including Bert C. Farquharson and Allison R. Morash. Their names are reflected in the area's Farquharson Street and Morash Pond.

Prince Andrew High School was built in 1960, shortly before the town and county areas of Dartmouth (including Woodlawn) were amalgamated into the City of Dartmouth in 1961.

== Street names ==
Many of the streets in Commodore Park were named for Canadian naval ships that were lost during the Second World War:

Street	Ship	Date commissioned	Date lost	Crew lost	Ref.
Athabaskan Lane	HMCS Athabaskan	February 3, 1943	April 29, 1944	129	
Guysborough Avenue	HMCS Guysborough	April 22, 1942	March 17, 1945	51	
Louisburg Lane	HMCS Louisburg	October 2, 1941	February 6, 1943	59	
Margaree Parkway	HMCS Margaree	September 6, 1940	October 22, 1940	142	
Shawinigan Road	HMCS Shawinigan	September 19, 1941	November 25, 1944	91	
Skeena Street	HMCS Skeena	June 10, 1931	October 25, 1944	15	
Spikenard Street	HMCS Spikenard	December 6, 1940	February 11, 1942	57	
Weyburn Road	HMCS Weyburn	November 26, 1941	February 22, 1943	12	
