= Greenough, Nova Scotia =

Greenough
- Area
- Location within Nova Scotia
- Coordinates: 44°41′08″N 63°30′29″W
- Country: Canada
- Province: Nova Scotia
- Municipality: Halifax Regional Municipality
- Community: Woodlawn
- HRM District: District 3
- Postal code: B2W
- Area code: 902

Greenough is a mostly-residential neighbourhood in Dartmouth, Nova Scotia. It is located in the east end of Dartmouth in the Woodlawn area.
