= Portland Estates, Nova Scotia =

Portland Estates
- Subdivision
- Location within Nova Scotia
- Coordinates: 44.665°N 63.515°W
- Country: Canada
- Province: Nova Scotia
- Municipality: Halifax Regional Municipality
- Community: Dartmouth
- Community council: Harbour East - Marine Drive Community Council
- District: 3 - Dartmouth South - Eastern Passage

Area
  - Total: 85 ha (210 acres)
- Postal code: B2W
- Area code: 902

Portland Estates is a suburban neighbourhood in Woodlawn, an area of eastern Dartmouth in the Halifax Regional Municipality, Nova Scotia. It reaches from Eisener Blvd. in the west, all the way to Portland Hills in the east, and is located to the south of Portland Street (Route 207).

== Geography ==
A relatively small neighbourhood, the size of Portland Estates is about 85 ha (210 acres).

== Transportation ==
Portland Estates is currently not served by Metro Transit (Halifax). One of the municipality's newer bus rapid transit routes has a terminus in Portland Hills.

== Shopping ==
Adjacent to Portland Estates

- Real Atlantic Superstore

Within a couple kilometres

- Woodlawn Shopping Centre
- Penhorn Plaza

== Schools ==
- Elementary (grades primary to 5) - Portland Estates Elementary School
- Junior High (grades 6-9) -- Ellenvale Junior High School
- High Schools (grades 10-12)
  - English, with optional International Baccalaureate (IB) Diploma program - Woodlawn High School
  - French Immersion - Dartmouth High School
  - French Immersion International Baccalaureate - Cole Harbour District High School

== Postal Code ==
- B2W ...

== History ==
- 1980's - Portland Estates opens
- 2000 - Portland Estates Elementary School opens
- 2001-2008 - Portland Hills opens
- 2006-2008+ - Russell Lake and Russell Lake West opens
