= Lindell Wigginton =

Canadian basketball player (born 1998)

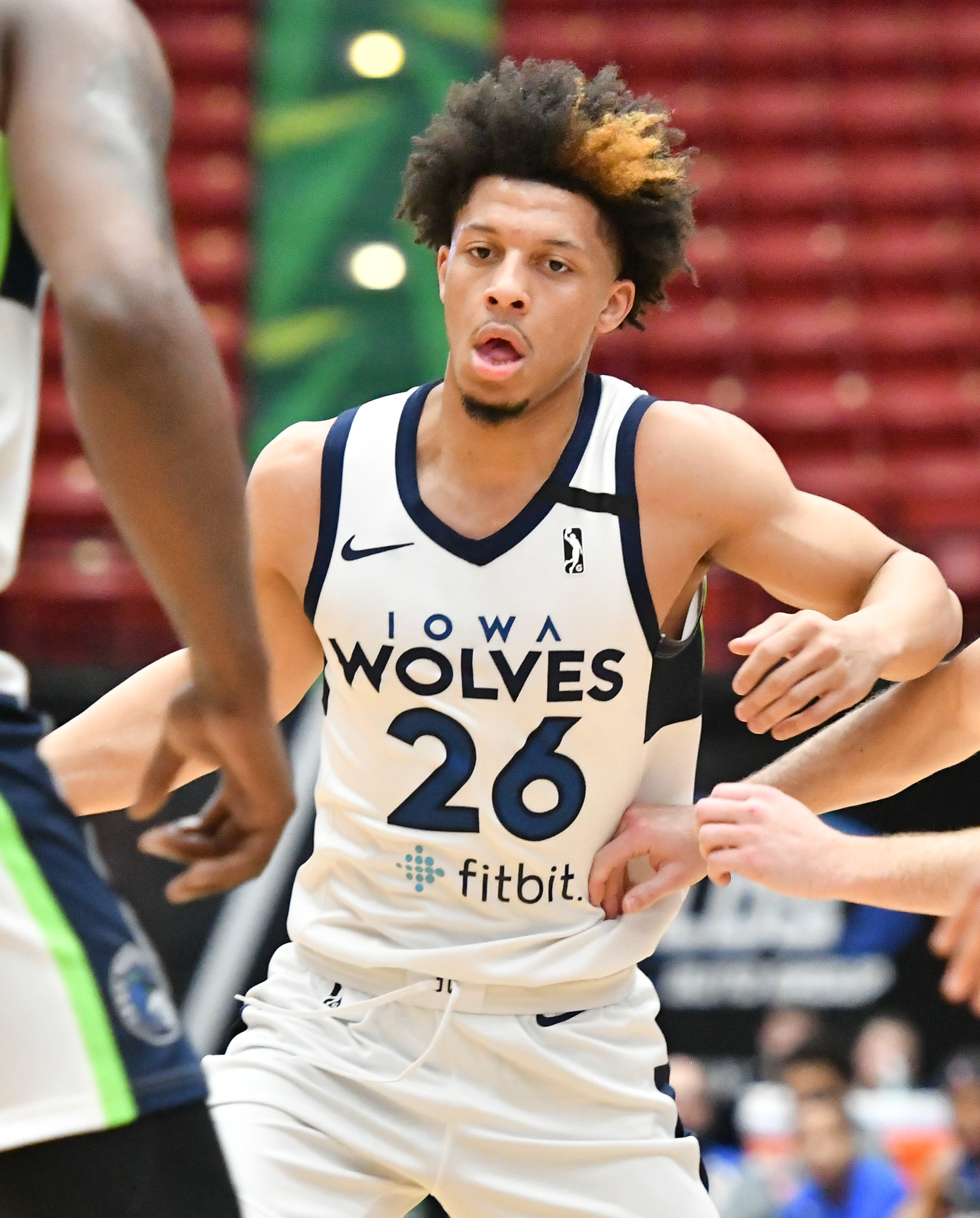
- Wigginton with the Iowa Wolves in 2020

No. 28 – Shanxi Loongs
- Position: Point guard
- League: CBA

Personal information
- Born: March 28, 1998 (age 28) Halifax, Nova Scotia, Canada
- Listed height: 6 ft 2 in (1.88 m)
- Listed weight: 200 lb (91 kg)

Career information
- High school: Prince Andrew (Dartmouth, Nova Scotia); Oak Hill Academy (Mouth of Wilson, Virginia)
- College: Iowa State (2017–2019)
- NBA draft: 2019: undrafted
- Playing career: 2019–present

Career history
- 2019–2021: Iowa Wolves
- 2020: Ironi Nes Ziona
- 2021: Hamilton Honey Badgers
- 2021–2023: Wisconsin Herd
- 2022–2024: Milwaukee Bucks
- 2022–2024: →Wisconsin Herd
- 2024: Xinjiang Flying Tigers
- 2024: Shandong Hi-Speed Kirin
- 2025–2026: Guangzhou Loong Lions
- 2026–present: Shanxi Loongs

Career highlights
- All-CEBL First Team (2021); Big 12 Sixth Man of the Year (2019); Big 12 All-Newcomer Team (2018)
- Stats at NBA.com
- Stats at Basketball Reference
Medals
Men's basketball
Representing Canada
FIBA Under-19 World Cup
| Gold medal – first place | 2017 Egypt |

Lindell Shamar Wigginton (/lɪnˈdɛl/ lin-DEL; born March 28, 1998) is a Canadian professional basketball player for the Shanxi Loongs of the Chinese Basketball Association (CBA). He played college basketball for the Iowa State Cyclones.

== High school career ==
Wigginton's mother grew up in Halifax's Uniacke Square and his father is from North Preston. He played one year at Prince Andrew High School in his native Dartmouth, Nova Scotia for Coach Ken Cooper before moving to the United States to join Oak Hill Academy in Mouth of Wilson, Virginia at the age of 15.

A four-star recruit in ESPN's ranking, he committed to Iowa State in October 2016, choosing the Cyclones over schools such as Arizona State and Oregon. Representing the World Select Team, Wigginton saw 22:16 minutes of action at the 2017 Nike Hoop Summit, scoring eleven points and handing out a team-high seven assists.

College recruiting
| Name | Hometown | School | Height | Weight | Commit date |
|---|---|---|---|---|---|
| Lindell Wigginton; G | Dartmouth, NS | Oak Hill Academy (VA) | 6 ft 1 in (1.85 m) | 165 lb (75 kg) | Oct 21, 2016 |
| Lindell Wigginton; G | Recruit ratings: Rivals: 247Sports: ESPN: | | | | |
Overall recruit ranking: Rivals: 24 ESPN: 39, 3 (VA), 9 (G)
Note: In many cases, Scout, Rivals, 247Sports, On3, and ESPN may conflict in their listings of height and weight.; In these cases, the average was taken. ESPN grades are on a 100-point scale.; Sources: "Iowa State 2017 Basketball Commitments". Rivals.; "ESPN". ESPN.; "2017 Team Ranking". Rivals.

== College career ==
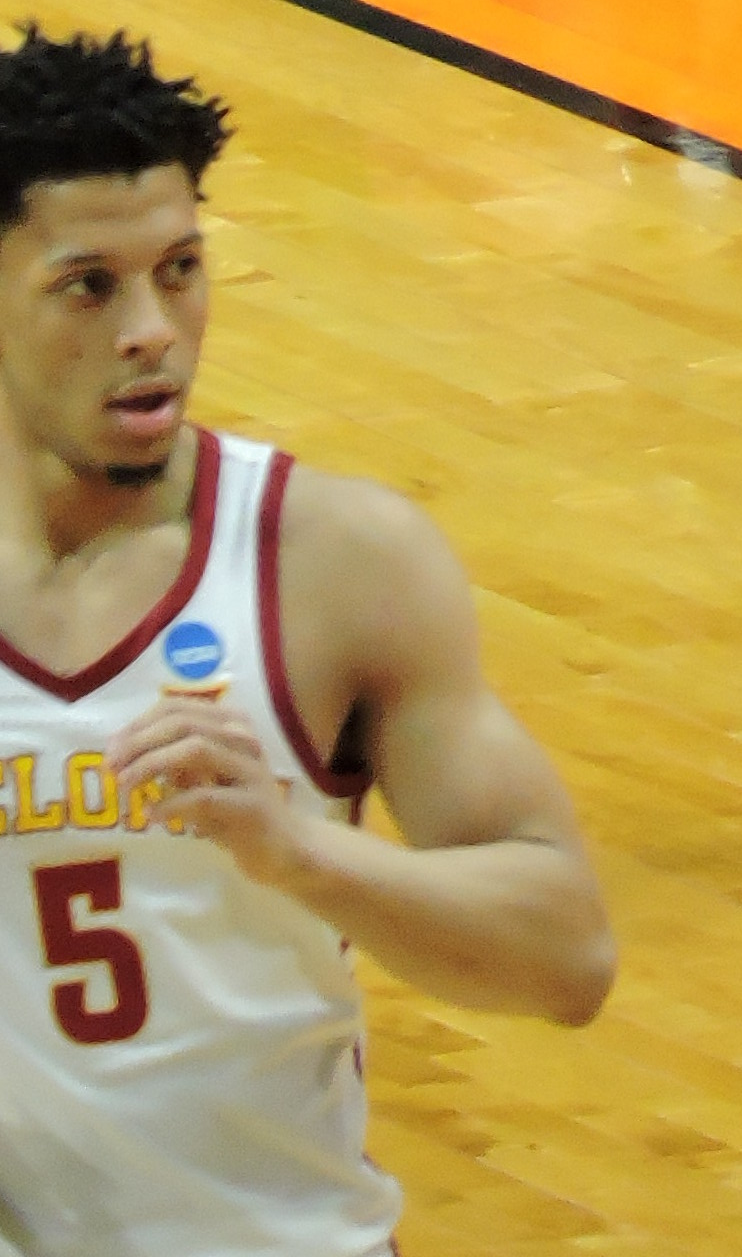
Wigginton with Iowa State

As a freshman, Wigginton was one of the best players for Iowa State, averaging 16.7 points, 3.7 rebounds and 2.8 assists per game. However, he struggled with turnover problems, losing possession 92 times on the year. After the season, Wigginton declared himself eligible for the 2018 NBA draft but did not hire an agent and ultimately returned to school. In his sophomore season, he averaged 13.4 points, four rebounds and 2.1 assists in 26 minutes per game and was named the Big 12 Conference Sixth Man of the Year. He started the first game of the season before suffering a foot injury, eventually starting two of 26 games. Following the season, he hired an agent and declared for the 2019 NBA draft

== Professional career ==
=== Iowa Wolves (2019–2020) ===
After going undrafted in the 2019 NBA draft, Wigginton joined the Toronto Raptors for the 2019 NBA Summer League.

On September 4, 2019, Wigginton signed an Exhibit 10 contract with the Minnesota Timberwolves. Under the deal, he ultimately landed with the Timberwolves’ NBA G League affiliate, the Iowa Wolves. On November 8, he tallied 24 points, seven assists, and six rebounds off the bench in a loss to the Sioux Falls Skyforce. Wigginton averaged 15.3 points, 3.7 rebounds and 3.6 assists per game in the G League.

=== Ironi Nes Ziona (2020) ===
On May 18, 2020, Wigginton signed with Ironi Nes Ziona of the Israeli Premier League where he averaged 8.6 points while shooting .550 from the field.

=== Return to Iowa (2021) ===
On January 25, 2021, Wigginton re-signed with the Iowa Wolves. In 17 games, he averaged 17.1 points, 5.2 assists, 4.1 rebounds and 34.9 minutes while shooting .549 from the field.

=== Hamilton Honey Badgers (2021) ===
On June 14, 2021, Wigginton signed with the Hamilton Honey Badgers of the Canadian Elite Basketball League.

=== Wisconsin Herd (2021–2022) ===
In October 2021, Wigginton joined the Wisconsin Herd after being acquired in a trade.

=== Milwaukee Bucks (2022) ===
On January 13, 2022, Wigginton signed a two-way contract with the Milwaukee Bucks. On April 10, Wigginton scored 18 points and recorded 8 assists during Milwaukee's final regular season game, a loss to the Cleveland Cavaliers.

On July 8, 2022, Wigginton re-signed with the Bucks. Wigginton joined the Bucks' 2022 NBA Summer League roster. In his Summer League debut for the Bucks, Wigginton scored seventeen points and seven assists in a 94–90 win over the Brooklyn Nets. On July 18, 2022, Wigginton was named to the All-NBA Summer League Second Team.

=== Return to Wisconsin (2022–2023) ===
On November 3, 2022, Wigginton was named to the opening night roster for the Wisconsin Herd.

=== Return to the Bucks (2023–2024) ===
On March 7, 2023, Wigginton signed a two-way contract with the Milwaukee Bucks. On January 7, 2024, he was waived by the Bucks.

=== Xinjiang Flying Tigers (2024) ===
On February 5, 2024, Wigginton signed with the Xinjiang Flying Tigers of the Chinese Basketball Association.

=== Shandong Hi-Speed Kirin (2024) ===
On August 24, 2024, Wigginton signed with Shandong Hi-Speed Kirin of the Chinese Basketball Association.

=== Shanxi Loongs (2026–present) ===
On August 16, 2026, Wigginton signed with the Shanxi Loongs of the Chinese Basketball Association.

== National team career ==
In 2016, Wigginton helped lead Team Canada to a silver medal at the FIBA Americas Under-18 Championship in Valdivia, Chile and played a crucial role in Canada's run to gold at the 2017 FIBA Under-19 World Cup in Cairo, Egypt, as he averaged 12.4 points, 7.0 rebounds and 4.2 assists per game during the tournament. He missed the quarter and semi final due to concussive symptoms, but was back for the championship game against Italy, scoring eleven points while tallying three rebounds and three assists.

== Career statistics ==
Legend
| GP | Games played | GS | Games started | MPG | Minutes per game |
| FG% | Field goal percentage | 3P% | 3-point field goal percentage | FT% | Free throw percentage |
| RPG | Rebounds per game | APG | Assists per game | SPG | Steals per game |
| BPG | Blocks per game | PPG | Points per game | **Bold** | Career high |

=== NBA ===
| Year | Team | GP | GS | MPG | FG% | 3P% | FT% | RPG | APG | SPG | BPG | PPG |
|---|---|---|---|---|---|---|---|---|---|---|---|---|
| 2021–22 | Milwaukee | **19** | 0 | 10.5 | .426 | **.346** | .543 | **1.3** | 1.2 | **.3** | .1 | 4.2 |
| 2022–23 | Milwaukee | 7 | **1** | **12.4** | **.486** | .333 | .889 | 1.0 | **2.0** | .0 | **.3** | **7.1** |
| 2023–24 | Milwaukee | 3 | 0 | 2.5 | .400 | .000 | **1.000** | .0 | .0 | .0 | .0 | 2.0 |
| Career | | 29 | 1 | 10.1 | .447 | .326 | .630 | 1.1 | 1.3 | .2 | .1 | 4.7 |

=== College ===
| Year | Team | GP | GS | MPG | FG% | 3P% | FT% | RPG | APG | SPG | BPG | PPG |
|---|---|---|---|---|---|---|---|---|---|---|---|---|
| 2017–18 | Iowa State | **31** | **31** | **33.0** | **.414** | **.401** | .660 | 3.7 | **2.8** | **.9** | **.4** | **16.7** |
| 2018–19 | Iowa State | 25 | 2 | 26.0 | .413 | .390 | **.720** | **4.0** | 2.1 | .8 | **.4** | 13.4 |
| Career | | 56 | 33 | 29.8 | .414 | .397 | .687 | 3.9 | 2.5 | .8 | .4 | 15.2 |
