= Maria Lawson (disambiguation) =

Maria Lawson (born 1979) is a British singer.

Maria Lawson may also refer to:

- Maria Lawson (album), her eponymous 2006 debut album
- Maria Lawson, actress in The 25th Annual Putnam County Spelling Bee

== See also ==
- Ana Maria Lawson, Miss Maryland Teen USA 2008
- Mary Lawson (disambiguation)
