= Angus L. Macdonald Bridge =

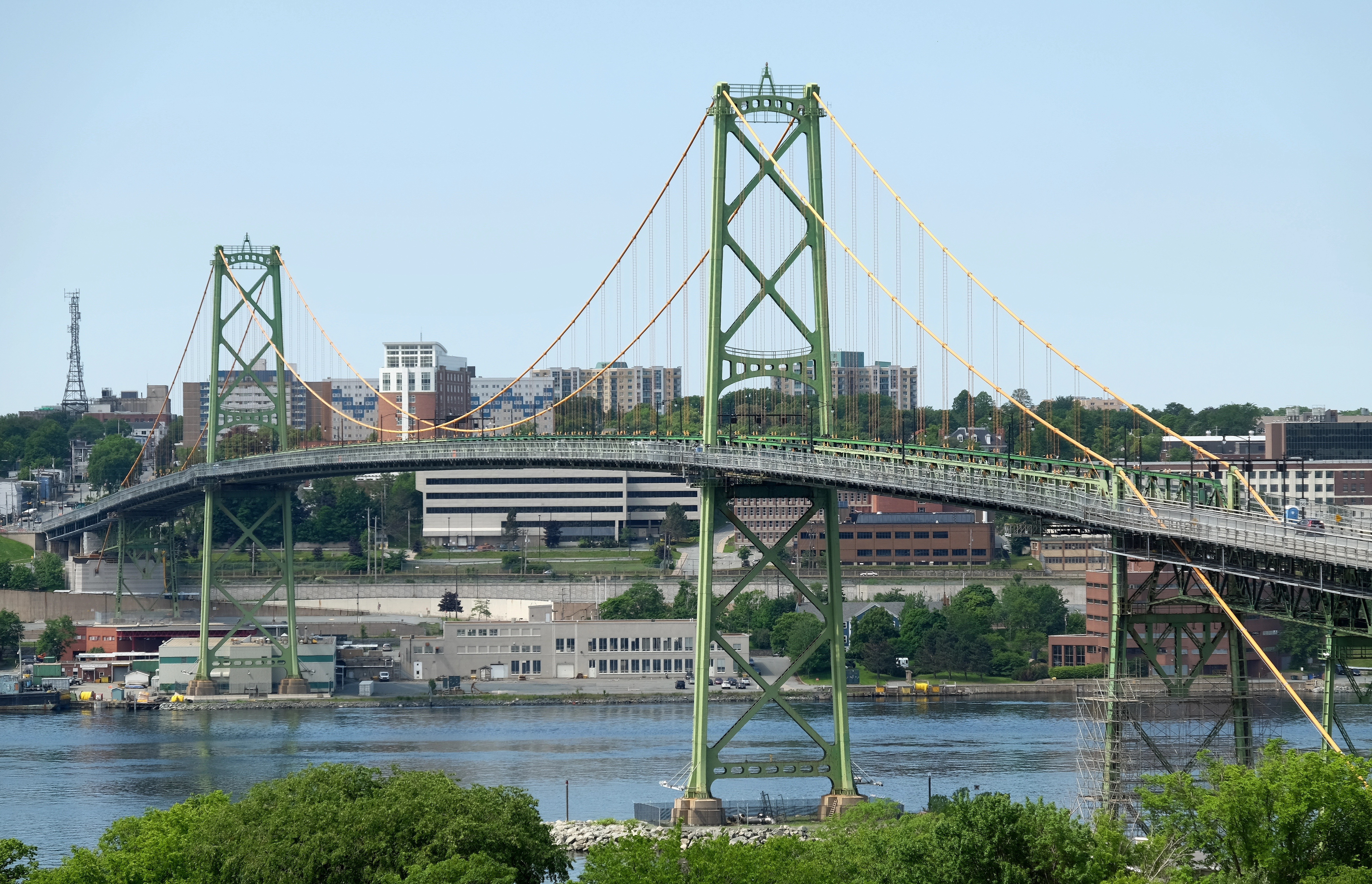
- The Macdonald Bridge in July 2015.
- Coordinates: 44.6637°N 63.5846°W
- Carries: Motor vehicles, pedestrians, and bicycles
- Crosses: Halifax Harbour
- Locale: Halifax Regional Municipality (Halifax — Dartmouth)
- Official name: Angus L. Macdonald Bridge
- Other name(s): Macdonald Bridge; The Old Bridge
- Maintained by: Halifax-Dartmouth Bridge Commission
- MMSI: 16261

Characteristics
- Design: Suspension bridge
- Total length: 1.3 kilometres (0.81 mi)
- Width: 11.5 metres (34.8 feet)
- Height: 102.9 metres (337.69 feet)
- Longest span: 441 metres
- Clearance above: 4 metres (13.1 ft)
- Clearance below: 46.9 metres (153.87 ft) at centre-span

History
- Designer: Philip Louis Pratley; Henry Hugh Lewis Pratley; Charles Nicholas Monsarrat
- Construction start: 1952
- Opened: April 2, 1955

Statistics
- Daily traffic: 44,000 (2012)
- Toll: none/free (as of March 14, 2025)

Location
- Interactive map of Angus L. Macdonald Bridge

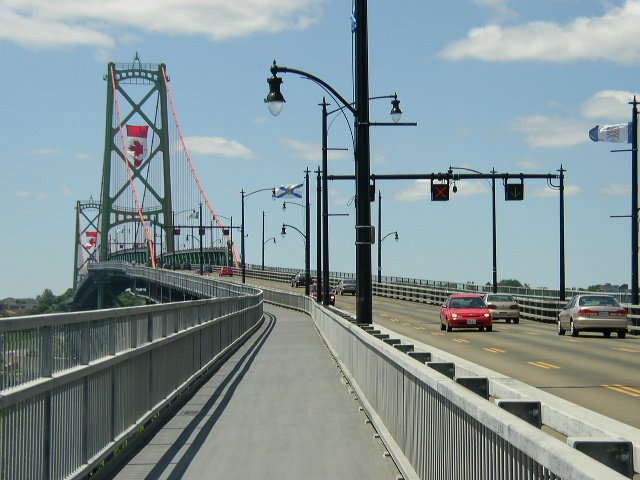
Angus L. Macdonald Bridge on Canada Day

The Angus L. Macdonald Bridge is a suspension bridge crossing Halifax Harbour in Nova Scotia, Canada; it opened on April 2, 1955.

The bridge is one of two suspension bridges linking the Halifax Peninsula to Dartmouth in the Halifax Regional Municipality.

It is named after the former premier of Nova Scotia, Angus L. Macdonald, who had died in 1954 and had been instrumental in having the bridge built. The bridge was designed by Philip Louis Pratley, one of Canada's foremost long-span bridge designers who had also been responsible for the Lions Gate Bridge in Vancouver. The bridges have a similar design, which is most notable in the towers. The contractor was Dominion Bridge Company Ltd.

The bridge regularly experiences traffic congestion during rush hours as a result of the structure's proximity to the downtown cores of Halifax and Dartmouth, as well as its narrow width. Large commercial vehicles are not permitted to cross and must use the wider MacKay Bridge to the northwest. Public transit buses are allowed to cross and the bridge links several Halifax Transit routes. In 2014/15 the average number of vehicle crossings per month was 1,183,095.

As of January 3, 2022 the toll charge to cross for regular passenger vehicles was $1.25 cash or $1.00 with the MACPASS electronic toll system. The original toll, when the Macdonald opened in 1955, was 40 cents plus 5 cents per passenger. There was also a separate toll for trucks, cyclists, pedestrians, motorcycles and horses/rider. This bridge is now toll-free (as of March 14, 2025).

== History ==
Construction of the bridge took place between 1952 and 1955. Caissons were used for underwater work. Five workers died falling from catwalks during construction. The bridge opened on April 2, 1955, and originally cost $11.5 million.

== 1999 modernization ==
A modernization project was undertaken in the late 1990s and completed in 1999 which saw the original two lanes and one sidewalk and utility corridor expanded to three lanes, with the centre lane being reversible to assist with traffic flow during peak periods.

To reduce the weight of the roadway, asphalt and concrete were removed and special steel plating (an orthotropic deck) was used in its place. This deck is 35% lighter than the old one. New pedestrian and bicycle lanes were attached to the outside of the structure to replace the original sidewalks.

External aesthetic lights were added during the modernisation project which saw the bridge's towers lit for the first time on a continuous basis every evening from sunset until midnight. Critics derided the effort as a waste of electricity, given Halifax Harbour's frequent foggy weather conditions. The lighting was estimated by the bridge authority to cost in excess of $50,000 a year in 1999.

== Safety barriers ==
The Angus L. Macdonald Bridge has attracted media attention as the spot where well known environmental activist Tooker Gomberg is believed to have committed suicide on March 3, 2004.

In June 2004 the Department of National Defence filed a lawsuit against the Bridge Commission alleging that snow, ice, bottles and other debris rained down on HMC Dockyard below, endangering staff. The DND first sought $527,000 in damages for its efforts to protect employees, an amount that was later increased to $1.04 million. The lawsuit claimed that the issue had been exacerbated when chain link fencing on the bridge had been removed during the 1999 modernization. In July 2007, as part of the settlement, barriers were installed along 22% of the pedestrian lane at the bridge's western end (Halifax abutment) to prevent suicide attempts and protect navy staff below.

Initially, the Halifax-Dartmouth Bridge Commission was concerned that the structure was not capable of handling the additional weight of installing safety barriers along the entire span of the bridge. Subsequent computer modeling eliminated the previous concerns, and on May 13, 2009 the general manager and CEO of the Halifax-Dartmouth Bridge Commission, Steve Snider, announced that a tender for the long-called for extension of the barriers along the full length of the bridge would be issued in June 2009. By March 2010, the remaining sections of the safety barrier had been installed. The bridge now has safety barriers installed along 100% of its pedestrian walkways.

== 2015 "Big Lift" project ==
Beginning in 2015 another major renovation of the bridge started which saw the temporary removal of the pedway and bike lanes. At a cost of $150 million, every piece of steel that makes up the suspended spans, except the towers and two main cables, were replaced; the non-suspended approach spans remained. New vertical cables were required due to the relocation of the stiffening trusses from above deck level to below deck level. Construction mostly occurred overnight with the bridge open to traffic during the day, but many full-weekend closures were necessary. The replacement portion of the project was completed in February 2017.

After the Lion's Gate Bridge, this was only the second time that a suspension bridge had its suspended spans completely replaced while continuing to allow regular traffic flow during the daytime. Principal engineering work for the project was done by the same firm that managed the work on the Lion's Gate Bridge.

During the Big Lift project Halifax Transit continued to run its regularly scheduled conventional bus service across the Macdonald bridge, except during times when the bridge was closed. During scheduled closures, Halifax Transit operated a shuttle service using the MacKay Bridge.

Halifax Harbour Bridges also operated a free, 24-hour-a-day shuttle service during construction to accommodate the bridge's pedestrian and bicycle users. It operated on a load-and-go basis during the weekday morning and afternoon rush hours, and on a 30-minute schedule at all other times of the day and overnight.

== See also ==
- A. Murray MacKay Bridge – A newer suspension bridge crossing Halifax Harbour.
- Halifax Harbour Bridges
- List of bridges in Canada
