= Brightwood, Nova Scotia =

Brightwood
- Neighbourhood
- Location within Nova Scotia
- Coordinates: 44.6752°N 63.5721°W
- Country: Canada
- Province: Nova Scotia
- Municipality: Halifax Regional Municipality
- Community: Dartmouth
- Community council: Harbour East - Marine Drive Community Council
- District: 5 - Dartmouth Centre
- Postal code: B3A
- Telephone Exchanges: 902

Brightwood is a neighbourhood in Dartmouth, and part of District 5 of the Halifax Regional Municipality in Nova Scotia, Canada.

Brightwood is located between Thistle Street and Woodland Avenue (Highway 118), and contains the Brightwood Golf Course. The primary streets of the small neighbourhood are Victoria Road (Route 322) and Slayter Street. The course also borders on Crichton Park and Thistle Street

== See also ==
- Dartmouth High School
