= Halifax Harbour Bridges =

Nova Scotia Crown corporation

Coordinates: 44°40′7.8″N 63°34′37.1″W

- Type: Division of Link Nova Scotia
- Founded: 1950
- Headquarters: Dartmouth, NS, Canada
- Area served: Halifax Regional Municipality
- Key people: Tony Wright, Executive Director
- Owner: Province of Nova Scotia
- Website: halifaxharbourbridges.ca

Halifax Harbour Bridges (HHB) is a division of Link Nova Scotia responsible for the operation, maintenance, and management of the two suspension bridges crossing Halifax Harbour in the Halifax Regional Municipality of Nova Scotia, Canada. The organization operates the Angus L. Macdonald Bridge, opened in 1955, and the A. Murray MacKay Bridge, opened in 1970, vital transportation links between Halifax and Dartmouth. HHB's mandate is to provide safe, efficient, and reliable cross-harbour transportation infrastructure.

History The organization began as the Halifax Dartmouth Bridge Commission, a Nova Scotia Crown corporation established in 1950 to build and operate a permanent harbour crossing between Halifax and Dartmouth. The Angus L. Macdonald Bridge opened April 2, 1955. To support growing traffic and regional development, a second crossing, the A. Murray MacKay Bridge, opened July 10, 1970. The Commission operated as an independent Crown corporation before becoming part of Link Nova Scotia, the provincial transportation authority, in 2026. Halifax Harbour Bridges continues to manage the two harbour crossings and related transportation infrastructure.

Operations Halifax Harbour Bridges maintains and operates:

• Angus L. Macdonald Bridge – a 1.3-kilometre suspension bridge connecting downtown Halifax and downtown Dartmouth. The bridge carries vehicle traffic, pedestrians, and cyclists.

• A. Murray MacKay Bridge – a 1.2 -kilometre suspension bridge connecting the north end of Halifax with the north end of Dartmouth and Highway 111. It is the only Halifax Harbour crossing for commercial vehicles.

Together, the bridges accommodate more than 38 million vehicle crossings annually and form a key component of the transportation network of Atlantic Canada's largest urban area.

Major Projects HHB has undertaken several significant rehabilitation and preservation projects, including the Big Lift (2015–2017), which replaced the suspended structure of the Macdonald Bridge while keeping the bridge in service. The project involved the installation of a new, lighter bridge deck and supporting components.

In 2023, two 10,000-kg steel deck sections of the MacKay Bridge were replaced over two weekends in an intricate operation that required the use of a100-tonne crane that spanned nearly the entire width of the bridge. The project won multiple awards and national recognition.

In 2025, HHB launched Project LifeSpan, a multi-year preservation program involving the removal of decades of accumulated paint from the Macdonald Bridge towers, detailed structural inspections, repairs, and recoating to extend the life of the structure.

In 2026, an RFP was awarded to a consultant to evaluate viable long-term transportation options across Halifax Harbour Narrows, in expectation that the MacKay Bridge will have to be replaced or undergo major rehabilitation by 2040.

Toll Removal From their openings until 2025, both harbour bridges operated as toll crossings. Following a decision by the Government of Nova Scotia, toll collection ended in March 2025. The toll plazas on both bridges were subsequently removed, allowing for free-flowing traffic.

Governance Halifax Harbour Bridges is a division of Link Nova Scotia and is led by an executive director and senior management team. The organization is responsible for bridge operations, maintenance, engineering, asset management, safety, and customer service.

Community Involvement HHB organizes two annual public events on Natal Day weekend, Harbour Hustle and Bridgewalk, during which the Macdonald Bridge is temporarily closed to vehicle traffic and opened to runners/pedestrians. Its garden logo and banner programs help local organizations publicize milestones and special events and its key partnership program provides one community nonprofit organization the opportunity to partner with HHB to raise awareness of its mission each year. HHB also supports active transportation initiatives through the operation of the Macdonald Bridge's sidewalk and bicycle lane.
