= Grahams Corner, Nova Scotia =

Neighbourhood in Dartmouth

Grahams Corner
- Neighbourhood
- Location within Nova Scotia
- Coordinates: 44°40′45″N 63°33′03″W
- Country: Canada
- Province: Nova Scotia
- Municipality: Halifax Regional Municipality
- Community: Dartmouth
- Community council: Harbour East - Marine Drive Community Council

Area
  - Total: 0.84 km^{2} (0.32 sq mi)
- Area code: 902
- GNBC: CAOBT

Grahams Corner is a mostly residential neighbourhood located on the eastern shore of Lake Banook in Dartmouth area of Halifax Regional Municipality, Nova Scotia.

== Geography ==
About 2.2 km (1.4 mi) from Downtown Dartmouth, Grahams Corner has about 84 ha (210 acres) of landmass.

== Schools ==
- Alderney Elementary
