= Dartmouth High School (Nova Scotia) =

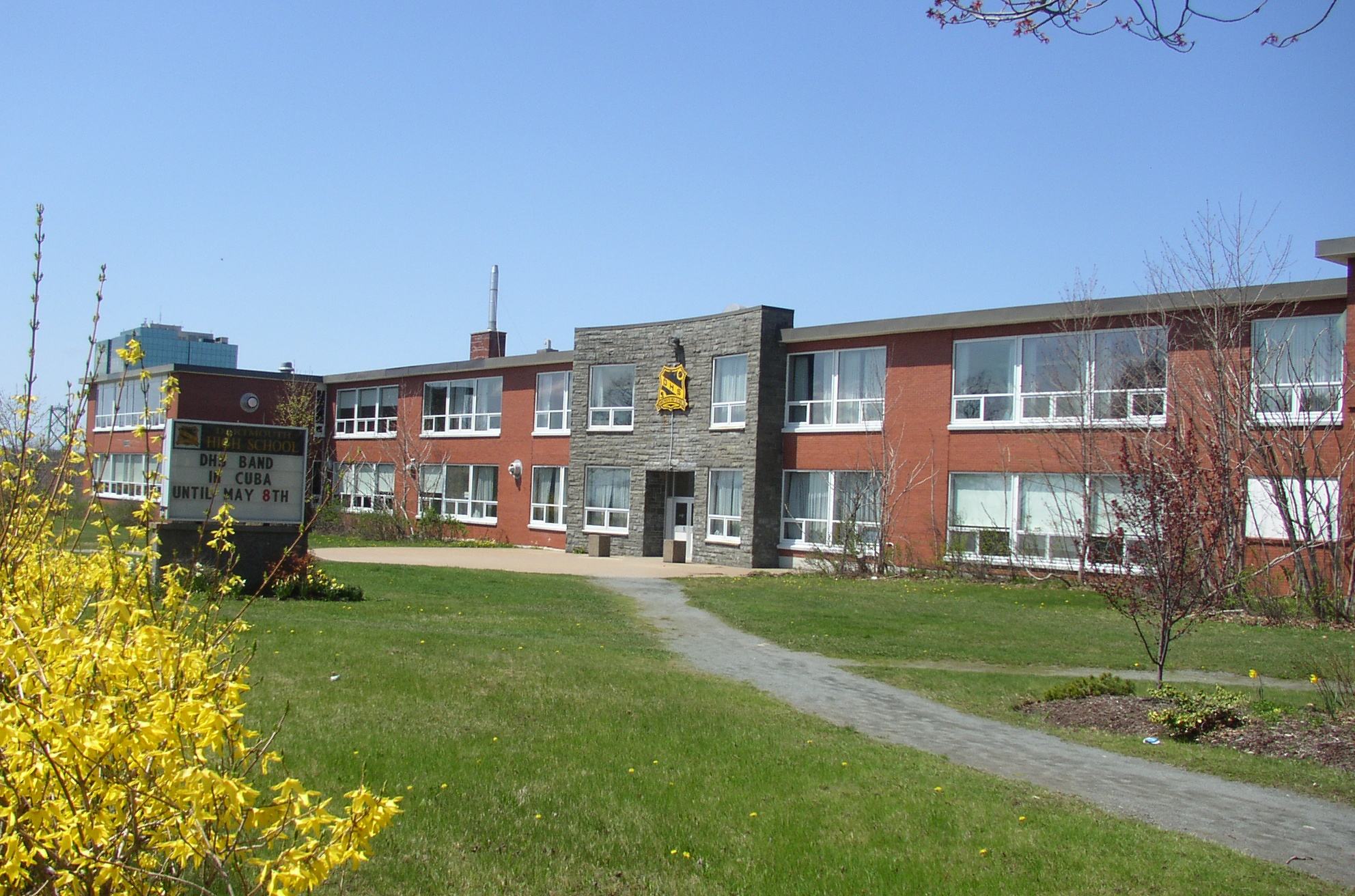

Location
- 95 Victoria Road; Dartmouth, Nova Scotia, B3A 1V2; Canada; 44.671598°N 63.572474°W

Information
- School type: High school
- Motto: Home of the Spartans
- Founded: 1959, additions 1961, 1967, 2012
- School board: Halifax Regional Centre for Education
- School number: HRSB ID 518
- Administrator: Angela Scott
- Principal: Eartha Monard
- Grades: 9-12
- Enrollment: 1021 (September 2019)
- Language: English, French immersion
- Colours: Gold and Black
- Mascot: Spartan
- Team name: Spartans
- Website: dhs.hrce.ca

Dartmouth High School is a Canadian public high school located in the Brightwood neighbourhood of Dartmouth, Nova Scotia, Canada. Encompassing grades 9 through 12, Dartmouth High School has always had a diverse student body with many ethnic groups, along with a wide variety of courses and educational opportunities for students. Along with English, the school also offers the French immersion program. Dartmouth High overlooks the Halifax Harbour, which can be seen from about one sixth of the rooms in the building.

== Staff ==
During the 2005–2006 school year, Dartmouth High School has had a teaching staff of roughly 60, with about 12 support staff. Due to changes in the teacher pension plan in Nova Scotia, 19 retired in 2006.

The school's former principal, Phil Legere, was honoured with the SAA "Distinguished Principal's Award" in 2005. He retired in 2008. The principal is now Eartha Monard.

== The Arts ==
=== Music Department ===
In 2001, 2003 and 2006, the school's concert band went to Cuba to help promote music and perform in the country. The concert band usually goes on lengthy and distant trips each year, though in 2007, they went on a smaller scale trip to Cape Breton for the Cape Breton Music Festival. In 2008 the band visited several European countries including Austria and the Czech Republic, and played in the Atlantic Music Festival. Following this trip, the band not go far in 2009, instead taking part in an Arts night, sponsored by the HRSB. The band went to Boston, Massachusetts in 2010. The School also has a Choral Group, Jazz Band, Ska Ensemble, and other smaller scale ensembles. The event known as "A Battle of the Bands" is held regularly in support of the Music Department.

=== Theater ===
The drama department stages a large scale production each year, usually in conjunction with the school's band or the Halifax Regional Arts, a division of the Halifax Regional Center For Education.

== Athletics ==
Dartmouth High School has competitive teams in all the major high school sports, most distinctively excelling in cross country and track and field where they have won many Metro banners. The Spartans have also won many recent Metro Boys Rugby titles, and Tier II Football titles in 1995, 2004, 2010 and current champions in 2018. The last Tier I Football Championship was won in 1971.

Dartmouth High School maintains a sports rivalry with cross-town school Prince Andrew High School, who they play each Thanksgiving in football, called the Turkey Bowl. The Turkey Bowl was suspended for the 2010 season due to vandalism of the playing field and fan violence.

== School renovations ==
In March 2011 demolition started of northeast side of the school for the construction of new gymnasium facility and an entire wing under the direction of the Nova Scotia Department of Education. The new gymnasium was completed in 2012, fully equipped with renovated locker rooms and a storage room. The project is expected to take 3 years and it required the offices of the Nova School Boards Association to be relocated . In the fall of 2010 school wide electrical upgrades started as well as a new roof.

== Transportation ==
Dartmouth High School is located next to the Bridge Terminal, a major bus station in the Halifax Transit system. In 2021, Halifax Transit launched a pilot program to provide high school students with free transit passes. The program aims to provide youth with convenient transportation and encourage the use of public transit. Dartmouth High School was chosen as one of four schools where the program is being piloted over the 2021/22 school year.

== Notable alumni ==
=== Entertainment ===
- Pat Stay – battle rapper and hip hop artist
- Allan Bundy - the first Black Canadian combat pilot
- Isaac Adeyemi-Bergland - professional football player
