= Woodlawn, Nova Scotia =

Woodlawn
- Locality
- Interactive map of Woodlawn
- Location within Nova Scotia
- Coordinates: 44°40′50″N 63°31′17″W
- Country: Canada
- Province: Nova Scotia
- Municipality: Halifax Regional Municipality
- Community: Dartmouth
- Community council: Harbour East - Marine Drive Community Council
- District: 6 - Harbourview - Burnside - Dartmouth East
- Postal code: B2W
- Area code: 902, 782
- GNBC code: CBPEB

Woodlawn is an area of eastern Dartmouth, Nova Scotia in the Halifax Regional Municipality, Nova Scotia that is mainly residential and retail. It is situated within an area with Highway 111 on the west, Portland Street (Route 207) on the east and Main Street (Trunk 7) on the North side. The first three digits of the postal code are B2W.

== History ==
Settlement in the Woodlawn area began as early as 1754 when the road between the Dartmouth ferry and the community of Lawrencetown was under construction. Some of the first settlers were United Empire Loyalists who moved to Nova Scotia after the American Revolution. The area initially got its name from the Woodlawn Cemetery, established by Ebenezer Allen in the late 1700s for local residents. Among those buried in the graveyard are Jane and Margaret Meagher, otherwise known as the "Babes in the Woods", who disappeared from their home in 1842. After an exhaustive search of the surrounding woods, they were found dead several days later and were subsequently interred in the cemetery. Woodlawn Methodist Church was built in the area in 1884. It became Woodlawn United Church in 1925, following church union.

Until the 1950s, Woodlawn had mainly been a rural farming community before the general subdivision boom of the late 1940s and 1950s reshaped the areas surrounding Dartmouth.

== Area neighbourhoods ==
- Bel Ayr Park
- Commodore Park
- Ellenvale
- Greenough Settlement
- Portland Estates

== Schools ==
- Elementary
  - Bel Ayr Elementary School
  - Brookhouse Elementary School
  - Mount Edward Elementary School
- Junior High
  - Ellenvale Junior High School
  - Eric Graves Memorial Junior High School
- High School
  - Prince Andrew High School
