= Manor Park, Nova Scotia =

Manor Park
- Neighbourhood
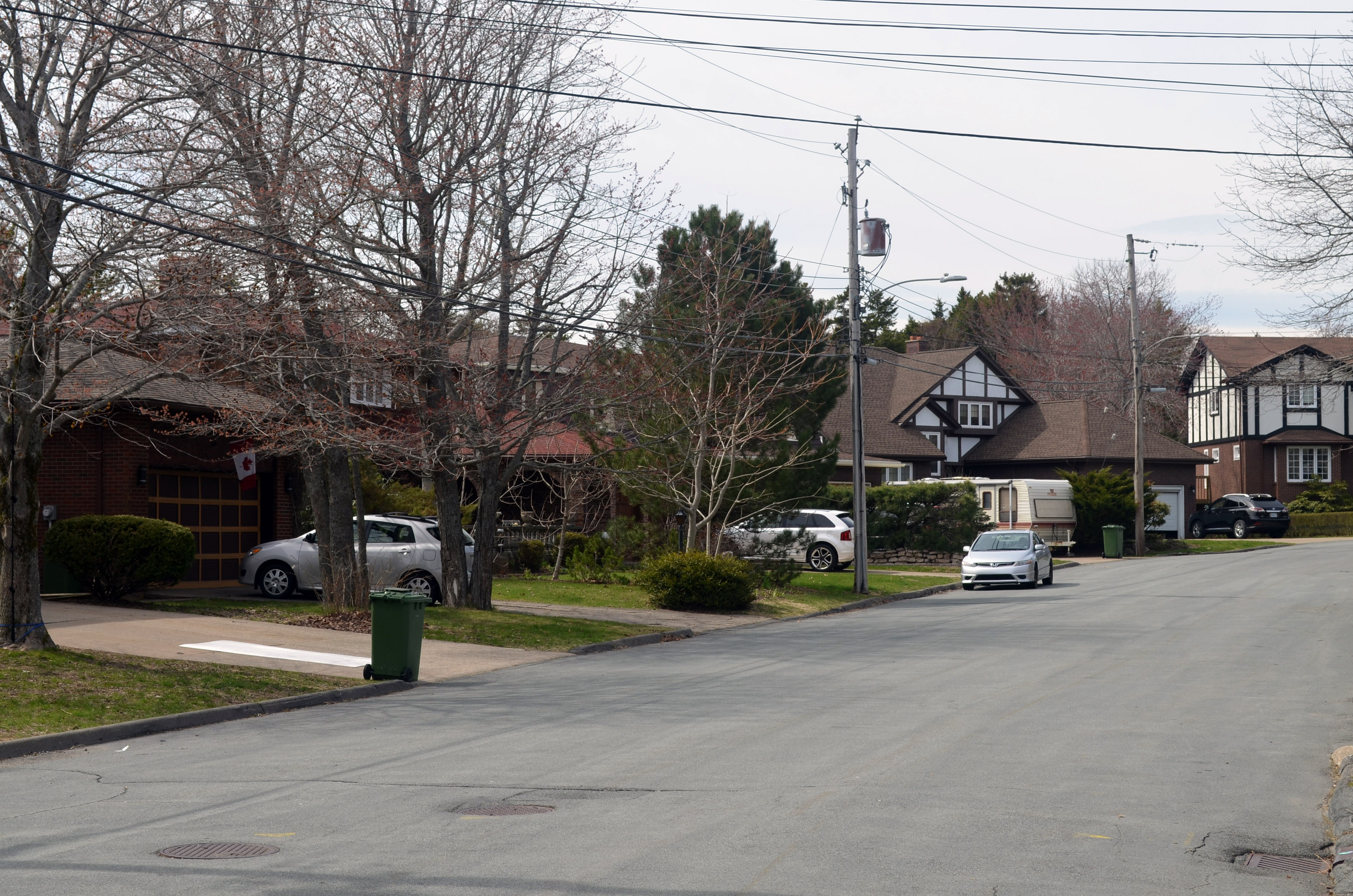
- Oathill Crescent

- Location within Nova Scotia
- Coordinates: 44°40′13.83″N 63°32′39.72″W
- Country: Canada
- Province: Nova Scotia
- Municipality: Halifax Regional Municipality
- Community: Dartmouth
- Community council: Harbour East - Marine Drive Community Council
- District: 5 - Dartmouth Centre

Area
  - Total: 54 ha (130 acres)
- Postal code: B2Y
- Area code: 902

Manor Park is a neighbourhood of Dartmouth, Nova Scotia, Canada. The main entrance to the neighbourhood is from the east on Portland Street (Route 207). A secondary entrance, from the west, is by way of Celtic Drive, rising from the low-lying area around Lake Banook.

Within this neighbourhood is Brownlow Park, one of Dartmouth's local parks. The park, named after Dan Brownlow, a former Mayor of Dartmouth, includes two tennis courts, a basketball court, a soccer field, a children's playground, and a pathway for joggers. The area also abuts Oathill Lake, which is surrounded by a wooded area with a walking trail. This lake is enjoyed by many including fishermen and swimmers.

== Transportation ==
The Manor Park neighbourhood is served by a Halifax Transit route, the 62 Grahams Grove, which connects the Penhorn Terminal and the Bridge Termonal via Downtown Dartmouth and the Alderney Gate ferry terminal.
