= Scott Frederick Cameron =

Colonel S.F. Cameron OMM, CD, QHP, MD was the 35th Canadian Surgeon General.

Scott F. was educated at Dalhousie University, where he graduated with a Medical Degree in 1980.

Cameron joined the military with the Medical Officer Training Plan (MOTP) while attending medical school, in 1977. His first posting was as a Medical Officer to Her Majesty's Canadian Ship (HMCS) Preserver "followed by a four year posting at Canadian Forces Base Gagetown, New Brunswick during which time he served a General Duty Officer, Flight Surgeon and Surgical Resident." During this period of time, Cameron was also promoted, in 1985, "to the rank of Major and appointed Base Surgeon."

In 1986, he was posted as Medical Officer to Canadian Forces Station Masset in the Queen Charlotte Islands, British Columbia. He remained in the position until 1988; at which time, he was posted as Medical Officer to Canadian Forces Base Winnipeg. The following year, he was promoted to Lieutenant-Colonel and posted as Senior Staff Officer, Regional Medicine at Air Command Headquarters, Winnipeg, Manitoba.

Subsequently, Cameron "assumed command of 1 Field Ambulance in Calgary, Alberta". in 1991. During this positing, he also "held the role of Brigade Surgeon." In 1994, he was posted as Commandant to the Canadian Forces Medical Services School at Canadian Forces Base Borden near Barrie, Ontario. Two years later, he went on "a tour as Force Medical Officer with the United Nations Mission in Haiti from April to August of 1996."

Upon returning to Canada in 1996, he was posted as the Medical Advisor to the Chief of Land Staff in Ottawa, Ontario. The following year, he was promoted to the rank of Colonel and posted as Director of Health Operations at Canadian Forces Medical Group Headquarters, remaining in the position until his "appointment as Director of Medical Policy on the staff of the Director General of Health Services." Following this position, he was appointed Surgeon General in 2000.
