= A. Murray MacKay Bridge =

Bridge in Halifax, Nova Scotia, Canada

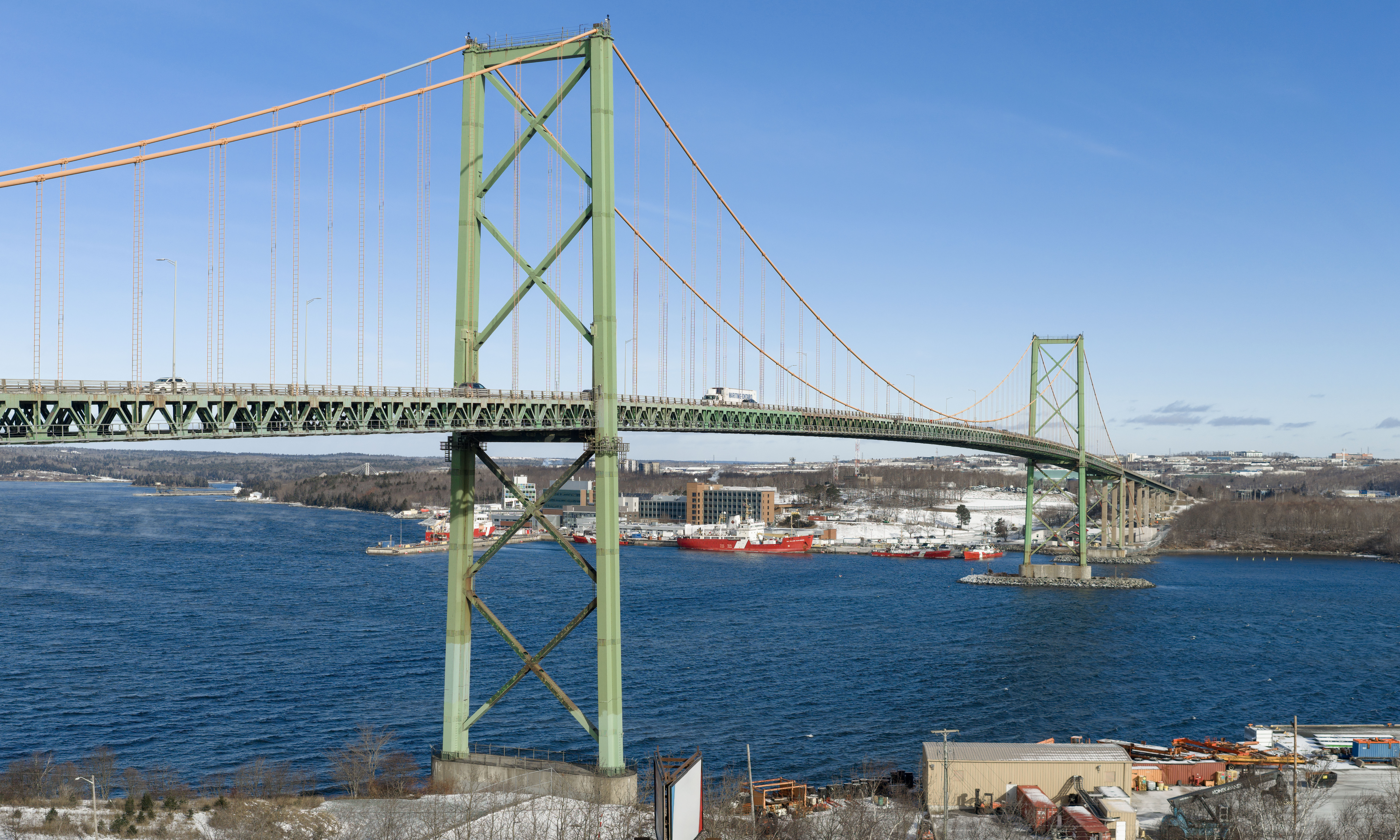
- MacKay Bridge as viewed from Halifax
- Coordinates: 44.6778°N 63.6119°W
- Carries: Motor vehicles
- Crosses: Halifax Harbour
- Other name: The new bridge
- Maintained by: Halifax Harbour Bridges

Characteristics
- Design: Suspension bridge
- Total length: 1,200 metres (3,937 ft)
- Height: 96 metres (315 ft)
- Longest span: 426 metres (1,398 ft)
- Clearance below: 46.9 metres (153.9 ft)
- No. of lanes: 4

History
- Constructed by: Canadian Bridge Division
- Construction start: 29 June 1967
- Opened: 10 July 1970

Statistics
- Daily traffic: 66,000 (2012)
- Toll: none/free (as of March 14, 2025)

The A. Murray MacKay Bridge, known locally as "the new bridge", is a suspension bridge linking the Halifax Peninsula with Dartmouth, Nova Scotia, and opened on July 10, 1970. It is one of two suspension bridges crossing Halifax Harbour. Its counterpart, the Angus L. Macdonald Bridge, was completed in 1955. The bridge carries on average 52,000 vehicle crossings per day, and is part of Nova Scotia Highway 111.

As of January 3, 2022, the toll charge to cross for regular passenger vehicles was $1.25 cash, or $1.00 with the MACPASS electronic toll system. Larger vehicles had higher tolls proportional to the number of axles. Tolls were removed as of March 14, 2025. The A. Murray MacKay Bridge is the only harbour bridge that permits semi-trailers and large trucks. Pedestrians and bicycles are not permitted on the A. Murray MacKay Bridge; they may instead use dedicated lanes on the Angus L. Macdonald Bridge.

== History ==
=== Planning ===
The Macdonald Bridge, the older of the two suspension bridges spanning Halifax Harbour, opened in 1955. By the early 1960s, growing traffic between Halifax and Dartmouth prompted the government to hire Montreal consulting firm Pratley and Dorton to carry out a study on the construction of an additional bridge (or bridges). Their report, the Halifax Area Bridge Study, was submitted in 1963 and explored two possible sites for a new cross-harbour bridge. The provincial government and the Halifax-area municipalities could not reach agreement on which site was best, so the province asked the bridge commission to make a decision. The site at the Narrows was subsequently chosen.

=== Africville ===
Political controversy preceded construction of the MacKay Bridge when the city of Halifax expropriated residents from the black community of Africville near the Halifax abutment.

=== Construction ===
The first construction contract; for the bridge piers, abutments, and cable anchorages; was signed with Halifax contractor Robert McAlpine Ltd. in April 1967. A sod-turning ceremony, marking the beginning of construction, was carried out on 29 June 1967 by Nova Scotia premier Robert Stanfield.

A contract for the bridge superstructure – including the two bridge towers, suspended spans, approach spans, and concrete decking on the approach spans – was awarded in August 1967 to the Canadian Bridge Division of DOSCO, a subsidiary of Hawker Siddeley Canada.

The Adhesive Engineering Company, based in San Carlos, California, was awarded the contract to apply an epoxy asphalt surface to the bridge's orthotropic deck.

=== Opening ===
The bridge was formally inaugurated by premier George Isaac Smith, in the company of lieutenant governor Victor de Bedia Oland, on 10 July 1970 with a ribbon-cutting ceremony that began at 2:30 pm at the Dartmouth toll station. The bridge opened to traffic later that afternoon. Speaking at the event, Premier Smith described the bridge as "another important milestone in the development of these historic communities".

The bridge is named after Alexander Murray MacKay, chairman of the Halifax-Dartmouth Bridge Commission from 1951 to 1971 and past chief executive officer of MT&T. MacKay was instrumental in having both the Angus L. Macdonald Bridge and his namesake structure built during his tenure at the commission.

=== Proposed renaming ===
Following the death of former Nova Scotia premier Robert L. Stanfield in 2003, there was a motion made to rename the MacKay Bridge to honour Stanfield, but the Stanfield family did not want any current structures already named for persons to be changed for Stanfield's sake. In 2007, the Halifax International Airport was renamed Halifax - Robert L. Stanfield International Airport; several new schools and other institutional buildings are also under consideration for Stanfield's name.

=== Financing ===
A decision was made to finance the construction of the bridge with low-interest loans denominated in foreign currencies, saving money in the short term and allowing the tolls to be kept low. In 1969, the bridge commission issued a 10-year bond of 100 million Deutsche Marks in West Germany. In 1973, the bridge commission obtained a loan of C$12.2 million from a Swiss bank.

However, the subsequent decline in the value of the Canadian dollar against the German Mark and the Swiss franc cancelled out the interest cost advantage and caused a massive increase in annual debt servicing costs. At its peak, the commission's debt amounted to nearly $125 million, nearly triple the approximate $42 million combined cost of construction for both harbour bridges.

== Design ==
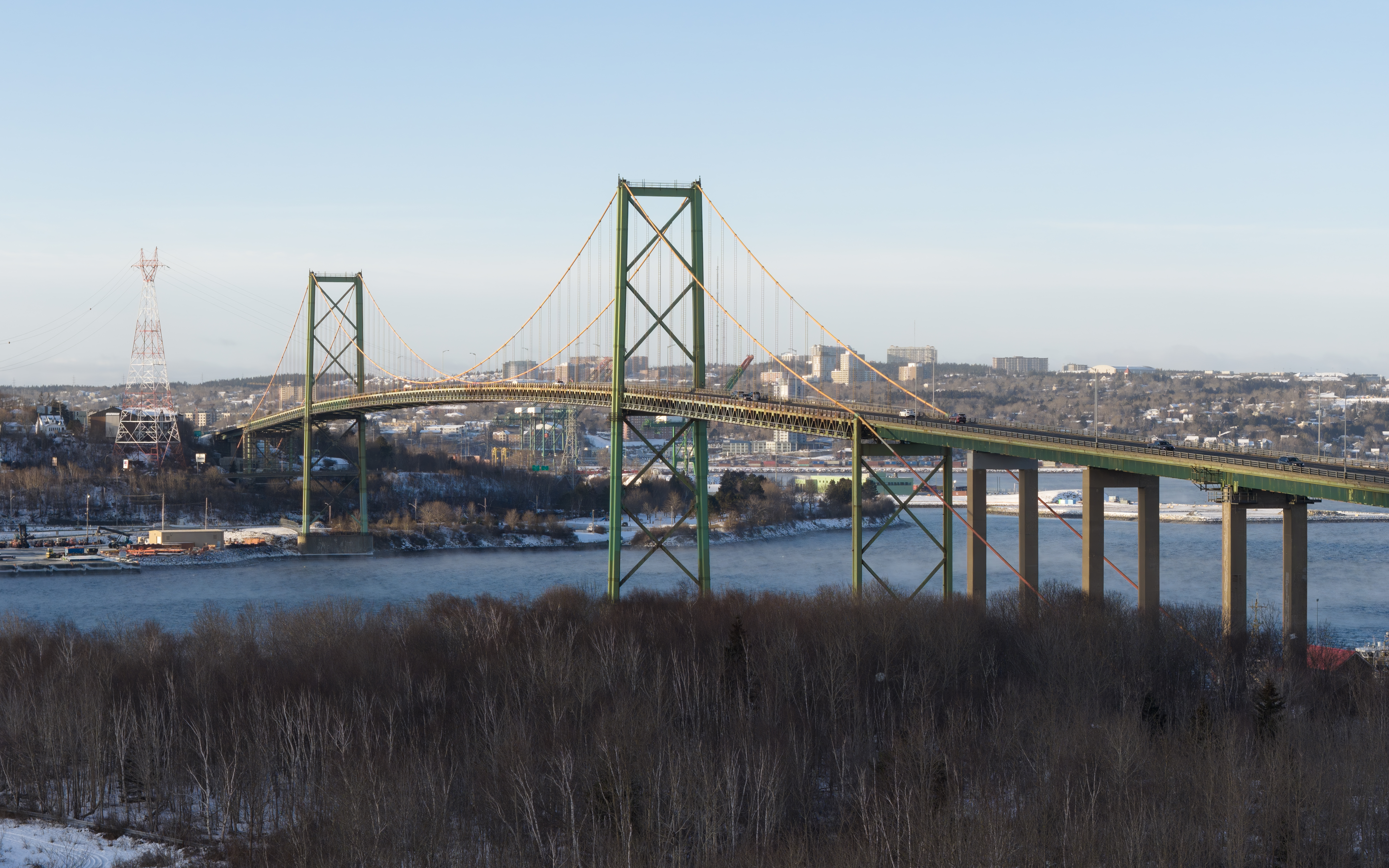
MacKay Bridge viewed from Dartmouth

The bridge measures 1,200 m (3,900 ft), with the total of all suspended spans being 739.9 m (2,427 ft) in length, carrying four traffic lanes with posted speed limits of 70 km/h (43 mph). It was designed with a maximum road gradient of 4 per cent. It is notable as having been the first bridge built in North America using an orthotropic steel deck, which yielded a completed structure having half the overall mass of the nearby Macdonald Bridge. The bridge's engineering also pioneered the use of wind tunnel testing, which considered the impact of winds on the structure both during construction and when complete.

In 2021 an engineer's report into the status of both the MacKay and Macdonald bridges indicated that the Mackay was approaching the end of its service life, and the need for either a major refurbishment or complete replacement was anticipated within a 20 year time frame. It also concluded that certain elements of the original design such as tight tolerance on the load capacity, and the emergence since the bridge was first built of a better understanding about fatigue in orthotropic decks, would make a re-decking project similar to the Angus L. Macdonald Bridge "Big Lift" impractical: To meet current code, a new deck would weigh more. This would mean that the replacement deck would necessitate a more extensive overhaul of other components such as the main suspension cables and support structures.

== Impact on development ==
The building of the MacKay Bridge, along with Highway 111, initiated a development boom in Dartmouth which eclipsed that created by the Macdonald Bridge during the 1950s and 1960s. The Burnside Business Park, the Mic Mac Mall shopping centre, and several residential developments in the Albro Lake neighbourhood in Dartmouth's north end during the 1970s are directly attributable to the bridge's construction.

== See also ==
- List of bridges in Canada
