= Woodlawn High School (Nova Scotia) =

Coordinates: 44°40′55.02″N 63°31′34.67″W

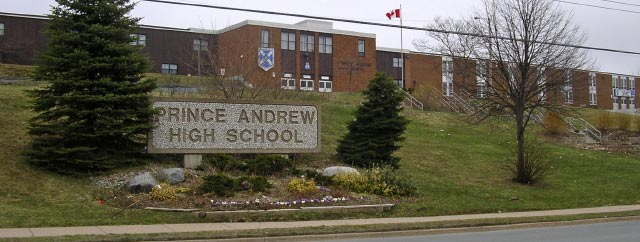
- Front of the school in 2006, featuring its former name

Location
- 31 Woodlawn Road; Dartmouth, Nova Scotia, B2W 2R7; Canada

Information
- School type: High school
- Founded: 1960
- School number: HRSB ID 127
- Principal: Craig Campbell
- Grades: 10-12
- Enrollment: 796 (2017)
- Language: English
- Area: 1,100 m^{2} (12,000 sq ft)
- Colours: Blue, Black and White
- Mascot: Panther
- Team name: Woodlawn Panthers
- Renovations: 1970, 1978, 1986, 2014
- Website: wdn.hrce.ca

Woodlawn High School (formerly Prince Andrew High School) is a Canadian public school, in Dartmouth, Nova Scotia. It is operated by the Halifax Regional Centre for Education (HRCE) (formerly the Halifax Regional School Board) and is an International Baccalaureate (IB) world school, offering the Diploma program. It also offers the O2 program (options and opportunities).

As of 2017, 796 students attend, and graduating classes consist of approximately 250-300 students.

The school was opened in 1960 and has gone through numerous renovations throughout the years, and also a second gymnasium was added in renovations. Additionally, upgrades to the cafeteria has given it a more modern design.

== History ==
The school was built for the 1960-1961 school year. In 1970 an addition to the school created a second gym, now known as the new gym, and a new wing. The additions in 1978 and 1986 added on wings, an auditorium, and expanded the library. Woodlawn High School's unofficial rival school is Dartmouth High School.

Woodlawn High School celebrated its 50th anniversary in 2010, when its 50th class graduated.

Formerly named in honour of Prince Andrew, Duke of York, the school was reported in 2019 to be considering a name change due to his allegations of sexual abuse, and because the name "no longer reflects the values of the community." In June 2022, the school was renamed to 'Woodlawn High School'.

== Fine arts ==
Woodlawn High School's Fine Arts program has a wide variety of courses including audio recording, theatre, visual art, film & video, band, dance, and drama.

== Courses ==
In the 2019-2020 school year the departments at Woodlawn High School include Languages, Fine Arts and Technology, Business and Social Studies, Math, Science, and Wellness. There are four levels of courses available within these departments— Essential, Foundation, Academic and Advanced.

Woodlawn High School is an IB World School. It has been offering the International Baccalaureate Diploma Programme since 2007, with its first graduates matriculating in 2009.

== Sports ==
Some of the sports offered at Woodlawn High School include Canadian football, ice hockey, basketball, rugby union, track and field, volleyball, soccer, field hockey, badminton, table tennis, softball, cross country, skiing, golf, and snowboarding.

== Notable alumni ==
- Eli Goree, actor
- Lindell Wigginton (born 1998), basketball player in the National Basketball Association
- Nick Eh 30, gaming youtuber and streamer
- Arnaud Durandeau, professional ice hockey player
- Sarah Conrad, Olympic Snowboarder, Nova Scotia Sport Hall of Fame Inductee
- James Tupper, Hollywood actor
