= Dartmouth, Nova Scotia =

Community in Nova Scotia, Canada

Dartmouth
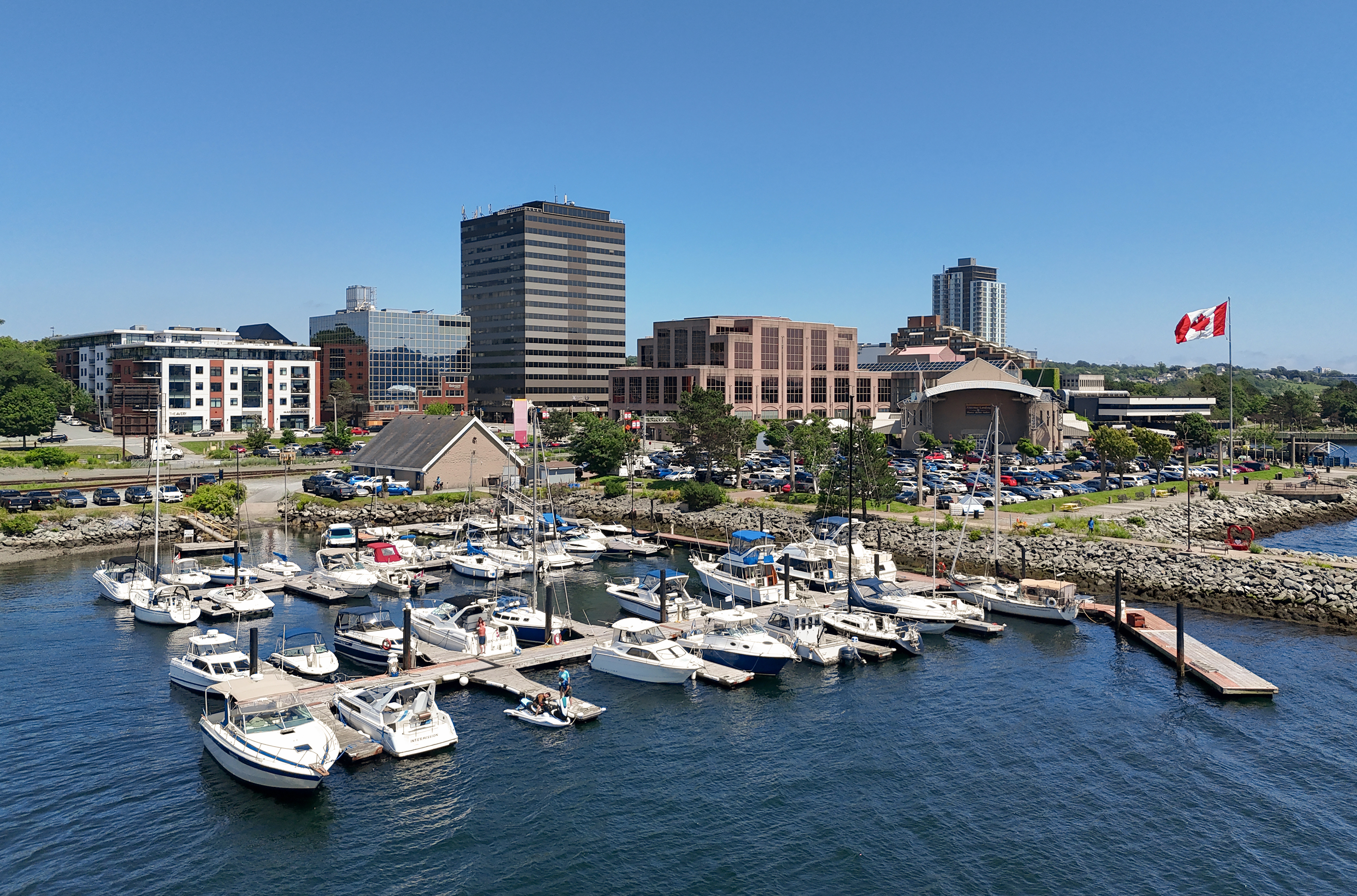
- Downtown Dartmouth skyline in 2025
- Nicknames: City of Lakes, "The Darkside"
- City of Dartmouth before amalgamation

- Location of Dartmouth, Nova Scotia Dartmouth (Canada)
- Coordinates: 44°40′0″N 63°34′0″W
- Country: Canada
- Province: Nova Scotia
- Municipality: Halifax
- Founded: 1750
- Incorporated City: January 1, 1961
- Amalgamated with Halifax: April 1, 1996
- Neighbourhoods: Albro Lake, Bell Ayr Park, Brightwood, Burnside, Commodore Park, Crichton Park, Crystal Heights, Downtown Dartmouth, Ellenvale, Grahams Corner, Greenough Settlement, Harbourview, Highfield Park, Imperoyal, Keystone Village, Lancaster Ridge, Manor Park, Montebello, Nantucket, Port Wallace, Portland Estates, Portland Hills, Shannon Park, Southdale, Tam O'Shanter Ridge, Tufts Cove, Wallace Heights, Woodlawn, Woodside

Government
  - Governing Body: Halifax Regional Council
  - Community Council: Harbour East - Marine Drive Community Council
  - Districts: 3 - Dartmouth South - Eastern Passage 5 - Dartmouth Centre 6 - Harbourview - Burnside - Dartmouth East

Area
  - Total: 60.339 km^{2} (23.297 sq mi)
- Highest elevation: 113 m (371 ft)
- Lowest elevation: 0 m (0 ft)

Population (2021)
  - Total: 72,139
  - Density: 1,195/km^{2} (3,100/sq mi)
- Demonym: Dartmouthian
- Time zone: UTC−04:00 (AST)
  - Summer (DST): UTC−03:00 (ADT)
- Postal code span: B2V to B2Z, B3A-B
- Area code: 902
- Telephone Exchanges: 433-5, 460-6, 468-9, 481
- NTS Map: 11D12 Halifax
- GNBC Code: CAIYJ
- Part of a series about Places in Nova Scotia

Dartmouth (/ˈdɑːrtməθ/ DART-məth) is a built-up community of the Halifax Regional Municipality, Nova Scotia, Canada. Located on the eastern shore of Halifax Harbour, Dartmouth has 72,139 residents as of 2021.

== History ==
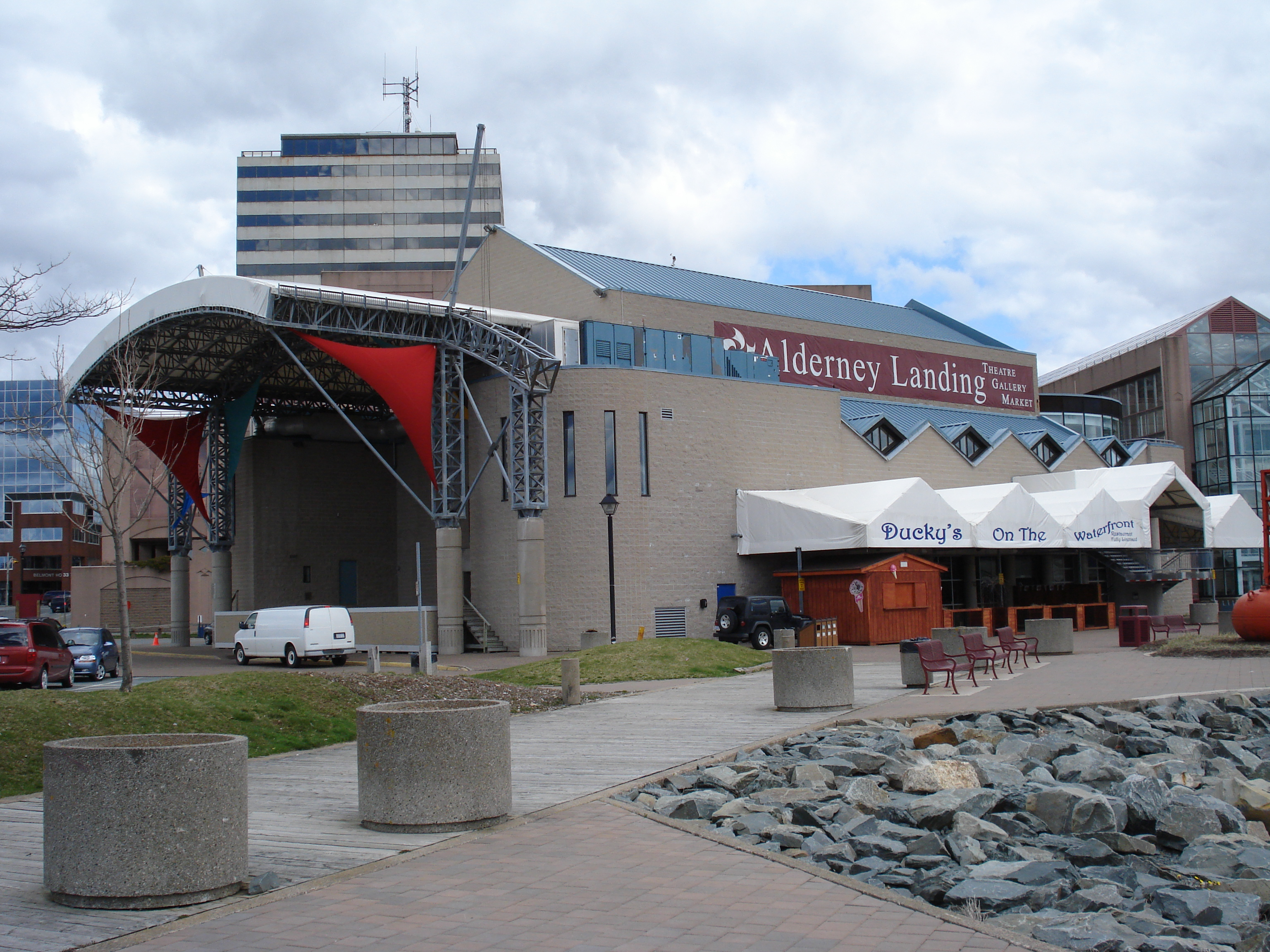
Alderney Landing, Dartmouth, Nova Scotia

=== 18th century ===
Father Le Loutre's War began when Edward Cornwallis arrived to establish Halifax with 13 transports on June 21, 1749. Many Mi'kmaq thought that the British were violating earlier treaties signed after Father Rale's War by unilaterally establishing Halifax. The British quickly began to build other settlements. To guard against Miꞌkmaq, Acadian, and French attacks on the new Protestant settlements, British fortifications were erected in Halifax (1749), Dartmouth (1750), Bedford (Fort Sackville) (1751), Lunenburg (1753), and Lawrencetown (1754).

In 1750, the sailing ship Alderney arrived with 151 immigrants. Municipal officials at Halifax decided that these new arrivals should be settled on the eastern side of Halifax Harbour. During the early years, eight Acadian and Miꞌkmaq raids were made on the new British settlement, such as the Raid on Dartmouth (1751).

The original settlement was made in an area the Miꞌkmaq called Ponamogoatitjg (Boonamoogwaddy), which has been varyingly translated as "Tomcod Ground" or "Salmon Place" in reference to the fish that were presumably caught in this part of Halifax Harbour. The community was later given the English name of Dartmouth in honour of William Legge, 1st Earl of Dartmouth, who was a former secretary of state. By 1752, 53 families consisting of 193 people lived in the community.

The oldest structure in Dartmouth is the house of William Ray, a Quaker and cooper from Nantucket who moved to Dartmouth in 1785-86 as a whaler. Its materials and construction methods closely resemble Quaker architecture in Nantucket, such as the asymmetrical façade design and stone foundation. It is located at 59 Ochterloney Street, and is believed to have been built around 1785 or 1786. Today, it is a museum, furnished as a typical modest dwelling of a merchant of that time.

=== 19th century ===
Dartmouth was initially a sawmill and agricultural outpost of Halifax. In the mid-19th century, though, it grew, first with the construction of the Shubenacadie Canal and more importantly with the rise of successful industrial firms such as the Dartmouth Marine Slips, the Starr Manufacturing Company, and the Stairs Ropeworks.

In 1873, Dartmouth was incorporated as a town, and a town hall was established in 1877.

=== 20th century ===
In 1955, the town was permanently linked to Halifax by the Angus L. Macdonald Bridge, which led to rapid urban growth.

Dartmouth's city hall was built in the early 1960s on the waterfront adjacent to the Alderney Ferry Terminal. The building was declared surplus and sold to Starfish Properties, and was to be redeveloped.

On 1 January 1961, the Town of Dartmouth officially amalgamated with several neighbouring villages into the City of Dartmouth.

The A. Murray MacKay Bridge opened in 1970, furthering commercial and residential growth.

The Dartmouth General Hospital officially opened on 14 January 1977, at 325 Pleasant Street. The hospital provides care to a catchment area of approximately 120,000 people.

On April 1, 1996, the provincial government amalgamated all the municipalities within the boundaries of Halifax County into a single-tier regional government named the Halifax Regional Municipality (HRM). Dartmouth and its neighbouring city of Halifax, the town of Bedford and the Municipality of the County of Halifax were dissolved. The city of Dartmouth forms part of the urban core of the larger regional municipality and is officially designated as part of the "capital district" by the Halifax Regional Municipality. At the time that the City of Dartmouth was dissolved, the provincial government altered its status to a separate community to Halifax; however, its status as part of the metropolitan "Halifax" urban core existed prior to municipal reorganization in 1996.

Dartmouth is still an official geographic name that is used by all levels of government for legal purposes, postal service, mapping, 9-1-1 emergency response, municipal planning, and is recognized by the Halifax Regional Municipality as a civic addressing community. The official place name did not change, due to the confusion with similar street names, land use planning set out by the former "City of Dartmouth", and significant public pressure. Today the same development planning for Downtown Dartmouth and the rest of the region is still in force, as well as specific bylaws created prior to April 1, 1996.

== Geography ==
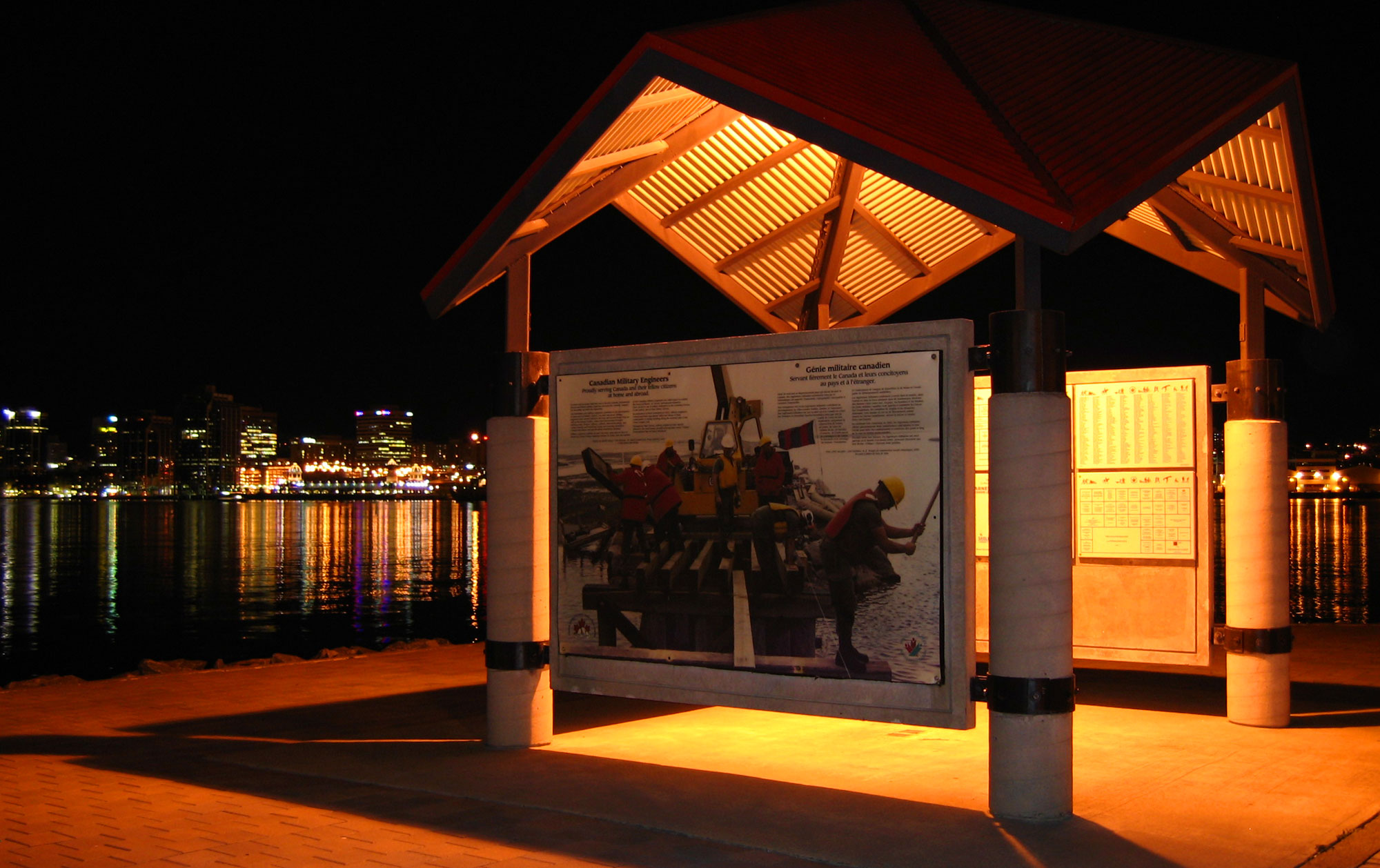
Display on Dartmouth waterfront, Dartmouth, Nova Scotia.

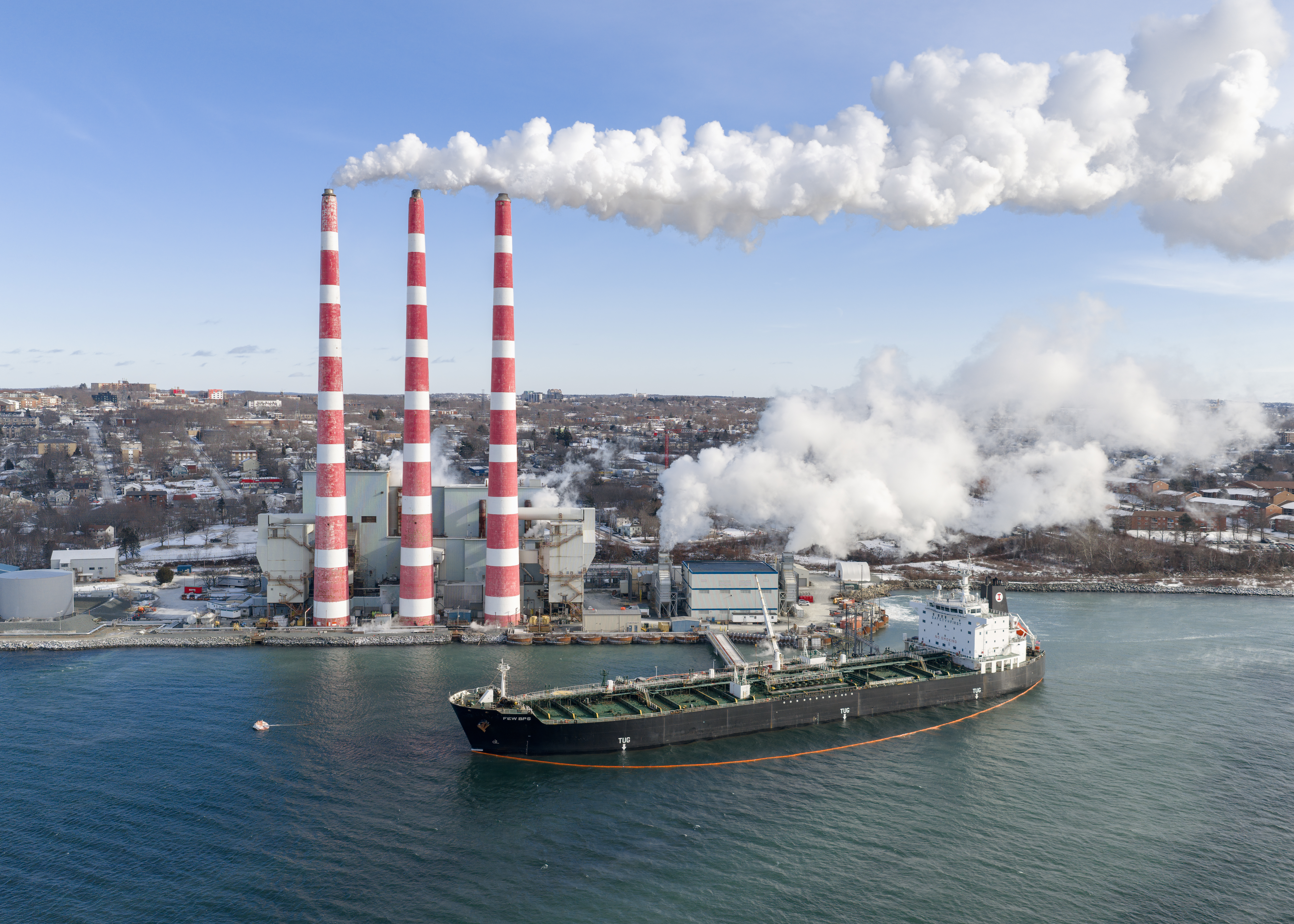
Tufts Cove Generating Station

Dartmouth covers an area of 60.339 km^{2} (23.297 sq mi).

Dartmouth boasts twenty-three lakes within its boundaries, Dartmouthians take pride in the chain of lakes within the community boundaries that form part of the Shubenacadie Canal. Most famous amongst these is Lake Banook, which provides an excellent location for recreation and attractive vistas. Dartmouth's most historic body of water is the artificial Sullivan's Pond, located north-east of the downtown area on Ochterloney Street. It was dug in the 1830s as part of the Shubenacadie Canal to connect Halifax Harbour with Cobequid Bay on the Bay of Fundy.

Neighbourhood	Land area	Notes	References
Albro Lake	147 ha (360 acres)		
Austenville	29 ha (72 acres)		
Bel Ayr Park	120 ha (300 acres)		
Brightwood			
Burnside	1,376 ha (3,400 acres)		
Commodore Park			
Cranberry			
Crichton Park	131 ha (320 acres)		
Crystal Heights			
Dartmouth Crossing	207 ha (510 acres)		
Downtown	36 ha (89 acres)		
Ellenvale	81 ha (200 acres)		
Graham's Corner	84 ha (210 acres)		
Greenough Settlement			
Harbourview	15 ha (37 acres)		
Hawthorne	32 ha (79 acres)		
Highfield Park	43 ha (110 acres)		
Imperoyal			
Lakefront	11 ha (27 acres)		
Manor Park	54 ha (130 acres)		
Montebello			
Nantucket			
Notting Park			
Park Avenue	25 ha (62 acres)		
Port Wallace			
Portland Estates	85 ha (210 acres)		
Portland Hills	133 ha (330 acres)		
Russell Lake West	251 ha (620 acres)		
Shannon Park	34.8 ha (86 acres)		
Southdale			
Tam O'Shanter	60 ha (150 acres)		
Tuft's Cove	76 ha (190 acres)		
Wallace Heights			
Westphal	77 ha (190 acres)		
Wildwood Lake	98 ha (240 acres)		
Woodlawn	114 ha (280 acres)		
Woodside	528 ha (1,300 acres)		

Map of Burnside Park.

== Government ==
Dartmouth is represented municipally in Halifax Regional Council by these three districts:

- District 3: Dartmouth South - Eastern Passage
- District 5: Dartmouth Centre
- District 6: Harbourview - Burnside - Dartmouth East

The community council that represents Dartmouth is the Harbour East - Marine Drive Community Council. The community council is held in various locations on the first Thursday of every month.

== Economy ==
In the early 19th century, there was a molasses plant. John P. Mott & Co. was established by John Prescott Mott sometime in 1844, and they made soap as well as other products.

On 11 June 1963, Prince Bertil inaugurated the Volvo Halifax Assembly factory in Dartmouth. Between 1963 and 1998, the plant built almost 350,000 cars.

Dartmouth also had the first IKEA store in Canada and the Americas, which operated between 1975 and 1988. IKEA returned to Dartmouth in 2017 in a new location, billed as IKEA Halifax.

== Transportation ==
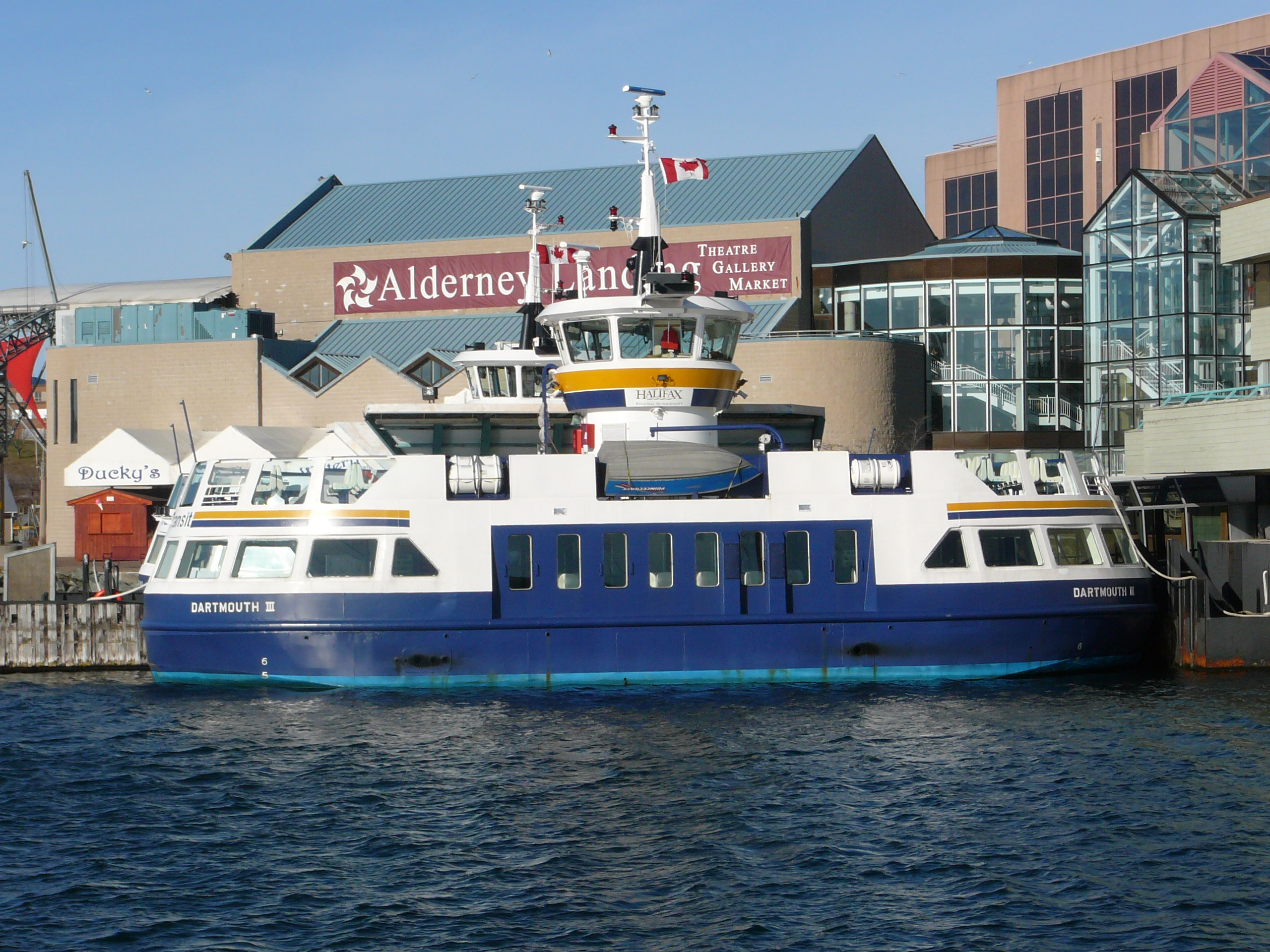
Ferry running between Halifax and Dartmouth, docked at Dartmouth Ferry Terminal.

Dartmouth is linked to Halifax by the oldest continuously operating saltwater ferry service in North America with the first crossing having taken place in 1752. Early ferries were powered by horses, which were replaced with steam engines in 1830. During the early 20th century, ferries shuttled pedestrians and vehicles between the downtown areas of Halifax and Dartmouth.

A railway trestle was built across Halifax Harbour in the late 19th century to bring rail service to Dartmouth, but it was destroyed by a storm, requiring the present railway connection built around Bedford Basin.

During the early 1950s, construction began on the Angus L. Macdonald Bridge, a suspension bridge crossing Halifax Harbour. It opened in 1955, ushering in an unprecedented development boom in Dartmouth. New subdivisions, shopping centres, office buildings, and industrial parks have been built in recent decades. A second bridge, the A. Murray MacKay Bridge, was opened in 1970 and the Highway 111 Circumferential Highway was built around Dartmouth to Woodside at this time.

== Demographics ==
The community of Dartmouth is coterminous with the former City of Dartmouth. After 1 April 1996, the former city was turned into a community of the Halifax Regional Municipality. The former city (and current community) consists of census tracts 2050100.00 to 2050114.00. As of 2021, the community has over 72,000 people within its boundaries.

Census Tract	Land area (km^{2})	2021 population	2016 population	2021 population Density (people per km^{2})	Population change (%)
2050100.00	5.84	4,352	3,855	745	▲12.89
2050101.00	1.672	3,476	3,343	2,078	▲3.97
2050102.00	1.32	4,979	4,623	3,771	▲7.7
2050103.00	1.893	4,281	4,228	2,261	▲1.25
2050104.01	1.245	1,976	2,015	1,587	▼1.98
2050104.03	2.345	3,116	2,943	1,328	▲5.87
2050104.04	1	2,628	2,549	2,628	▲3.09
2050104.05	1.5	2,862	3,030	1,908	▼5.55
2050105.01	1.191	3,129	3,082	2,627	▲1.52
2050105.02	2.107	4,569	4,613	2,168	▼0.96
2050106.01	1.56	3,758	3,538	2,408	▲6.21
2050106.02	8.962	5,117	5,106	570	▲0.21
2050107.00	1.538	3,166	3,000	2,058	▲5.53
2050108.00	2.269	4,859	4,769	2,141	▲1.88
2050109.00	1.267	3,316	3,200	2,617	▲3.62
2050110.00	0.805	1,819	1,481	2,259	▲22.82
2050111.00	0.971	3,328	3,132	3,427	▲6.25
2050112.00	1.646	2,505	2,014	1,521	▲24.37
2050113.00	3.052	1,397	1,317	457	▲6.07
2050114.00	18.156	7,506	6,569	413	▲14.26
Total	60.339	72,139	68,407	1,195	▲5.45

Historical population
Year	Pop.	±%
1762	10	—
1881	3,786	+37760.0%
1891	6,252	+65.1%
1901	4,806	−23.1%
1911	5,058	+5.2%
1921	7,899	+56.2%
1931	9,100	+15.2%
1941	10,847	+19.2%
1951	15,037	+38.6%
1956	21,093	+40.3%
1961	46,966	+122.7%
1966	58,745	+25.1%
1971	64,770	+10.3%
1976	65,341	+0.9%
1981	62,333	−4.6%
1986	65,243	+4.7%
1991	67,798	+3.9%
1996	65,629	−3.2%
2001	65,741	+0.2%
2006	65,634	−0.2%
2011	67,094	+2.2%
2016	68,407	+2.0%
2021	72,139	+5.5%
Population figures reflect the 1961 amalgamation.

== Military ==
Dartmouth has been home to several Canadian Forces installations:

- CFB Shearwater, located on the southern border of Dartmouth, is an air force base, formerly known as Naval Air Station Halifax, RCAF Station Dartmouth, RCAF Station Shearwater, HMCS Shearwater, and RCNAS Shearwater.
- HMC Naval Radio Station Albro Lake is a radio transmitter/receiver facility.
- CFB Halifax adjunct is an area on the Dartmouth waterfront opposite HMC Dockyard.
- Wallace Heights is a former military housing area in north-end Dartmouth.
- Shannon Park is an unused military housing area in north-end Dartmouth.
- Canadian Forces Ammunition Depot Bedford is a munitions magazine for Maritime Forces Atlantic, located on the border between Dartmouth and Bedford.

== Culture ==
=== Events ===
Dartmouth celebrates a number of festivals throughout the year, including the Ice Festival in January, Dart Music Fest in May, the Maritime Fiddle Festival in July, and the Christkindlemarket in December.

==== Natal Day ====
Dartmouthians celebrate a civic holiday known as Natal Day since August 1895. The concept originated as a means to celebrate the arrival of the railway, but construction of the railway tracks was incomplete on the appointed day. Since all the preparations for the festivities were ready, organizers decided to go ahead with a celebration of the municipality's birthday instead.

In 1941, the Dartmouth Natal Committee decided to erect a cairn in honour of the spirit and courage of the first English settlers to Dartmouth's shore. It is situated in Leighton Dillman Park, part of the common lands left to the community by the Quakers, and it overlooks the harbour where the first settlers built their homes. The monument stands 3 m (9.8 ft) high and is constructed from rocks gathered on Martinique Beach. A plaque in front of the cairn is inscribed and describes the arrival of the Alderney "on August 12, 1750 with 353 settlers."

==== Sports ====
The community hosted the ICF Canoe Sprint World Championships in 1997, 2009, and 2022. Dartmouth co-hosted the initial Canada Summer Games in 1969.

The communities main sport centre is the Dartmouth (Zatzman) Sportsplex which hosts a pool, walking track, gym, and community spaces.

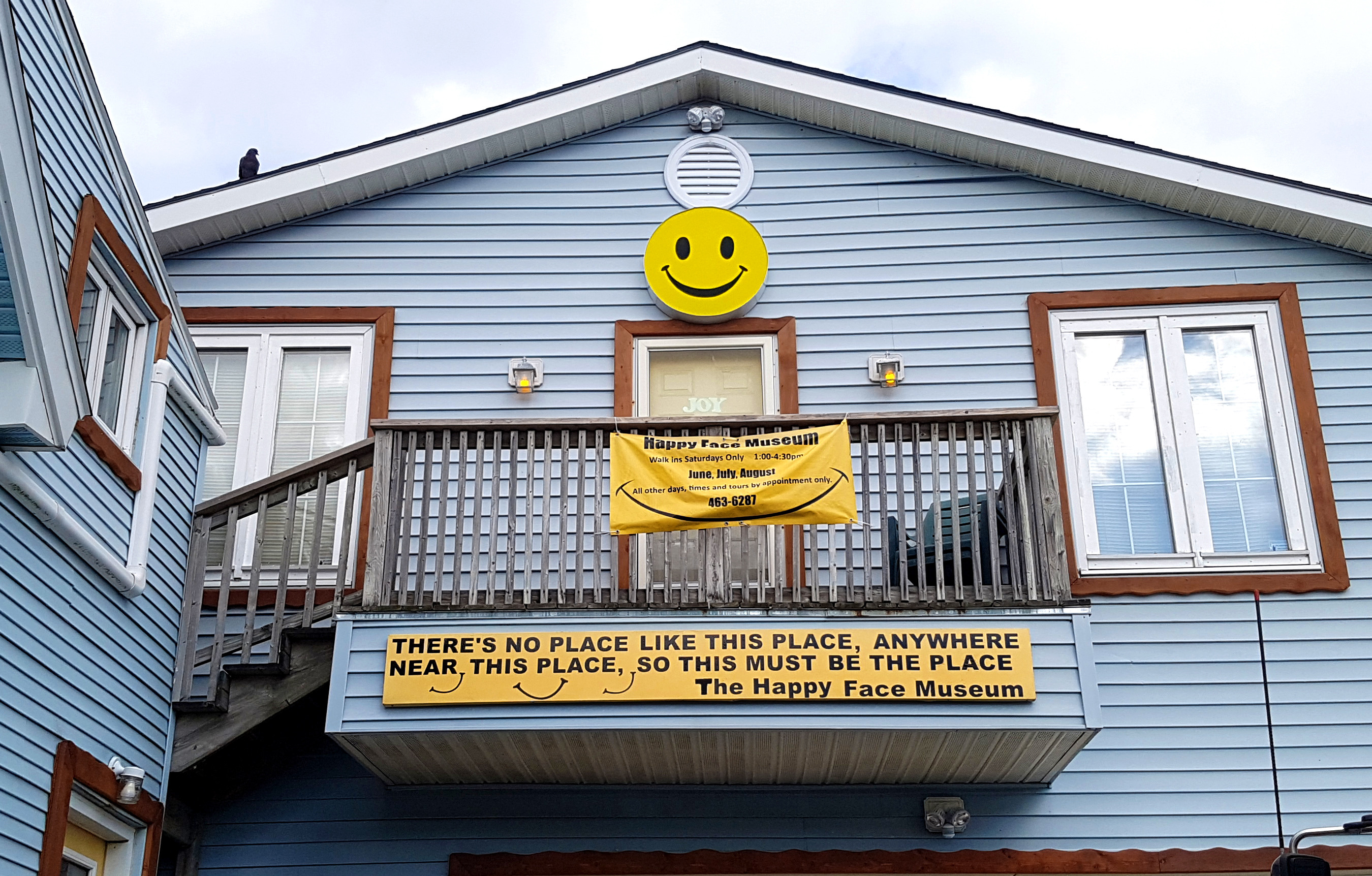
Signs outside The Happy Face Museum were photographed in 2017.

=== Media ===
Diggstown was filmed in and around Dartmouth.

The television show Trailer Park Boys was set in a fictional Dartmouth trailer park and was filmed in Dartmouth and its environs. The show featured actors (such as Robb Wells) and writers from Dartmouth. A documentary film about the creation and production of the Trailer Park Boys series is entitled Hearts of Dartmouth.

The Happy Face Museum previously was open on 22 Wentworth Street, and contained ephemera and information about the smiley face.

=== Symbols ===
The City of Dartmouth Seal, located on a police badge.

Flag of the former City of Dartmouth

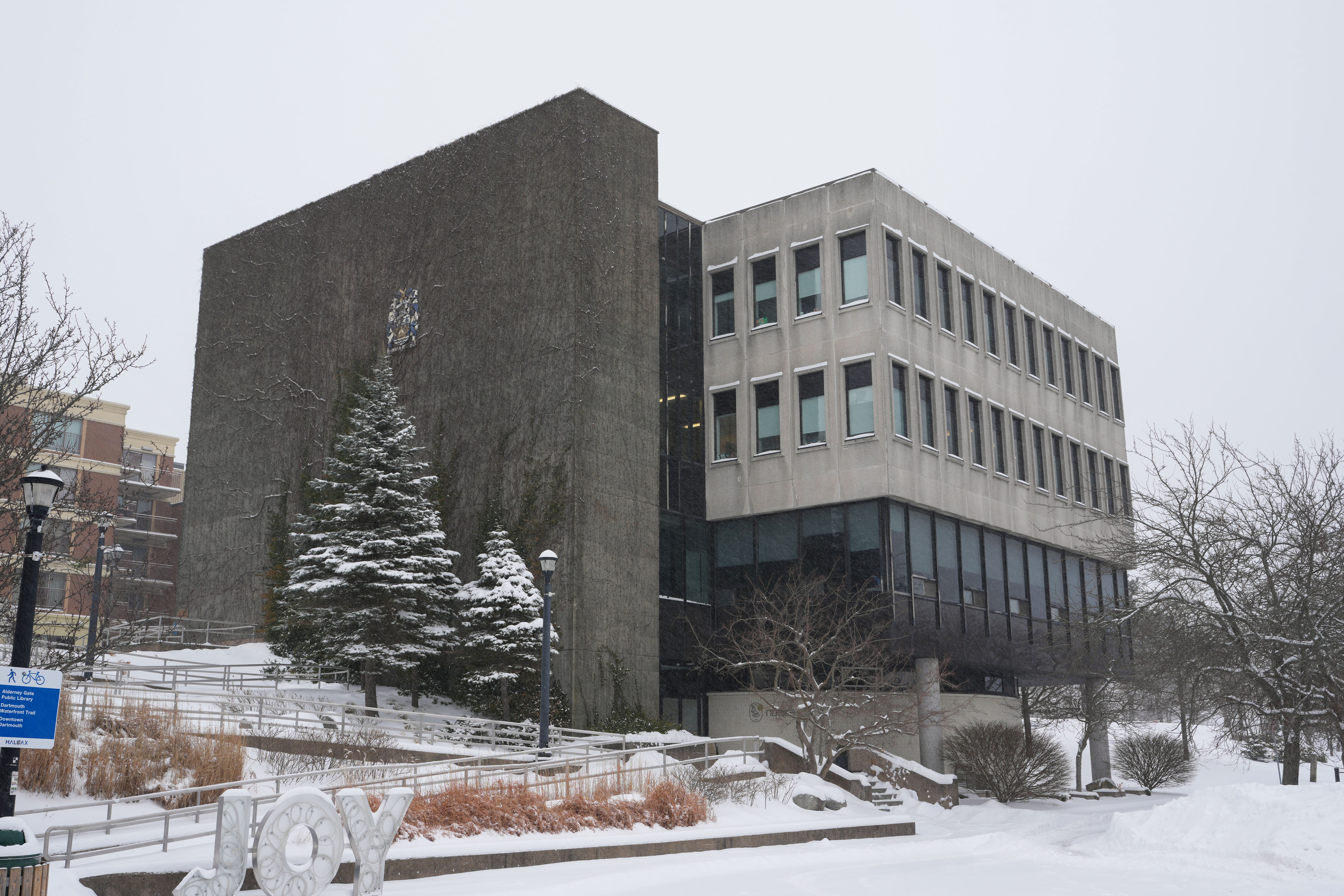
Former City Hall

With twenty-three lakes within the community, Dartmouth is nicknamed The City of Lakes. Dartmouth's community flower is the orchid, and its latin motto is Amicitia Crescimus, which is located on its community crest.

=== Ties ===
Before the 1996 amalgamation, Dartmouth was Halifax's sister city.

== Notable people ==
- Bobby Bass, professional wrestler
- Scott Frederick Cameron, 35th Canadian surgeon general
- Custio Clayton, boxer
- Steve Giles, Olympic paddler
- Vince Horsman, former MLB pitcher
- Michael Jackson, actor in Trailer Park Boys
- Mike Johnston, NHL/WHL hockey coach
- Ruby Keeler, 1930s Hollywood starlet
- Chris Kelades, mixed martial arts and UFC fighter
- Don Koharski, former NHL referee
- Wendy Lill, playwright, represented Dartmouth as a two-term New Democratic Party member of Parliament
- Kevin MacMichael, musician, Cutting Crew guitarist, attended Dartmouth High School
- Matt Mays, indie rock musician
- Christian Murray, actor, writer
- Arnie Patterson, broadcaster (CFDR and Q104 radio) and former press secretary to Prime Minister of Canada Pierre Trudeau
- Constance Piers (1866–1939), journalist, poet, editor
- Joel Plaskett, indie rock musician
- Andrew Russell, Olympic sprint canoeist
- Pat Stay, battle rapper
- John Paul Tremblay, actor in Trailer Park Boys
- James Tupper, actor
- Maxine Tynes, poet
- Robb Wells, actor in Trailer Park Boys
- Lindell Wigginton, basketball player in the National Basketball Association
- Aisling Chin-Yee, film director, writer, and producer.
