= Parks in Halifax, Nova Scotia =

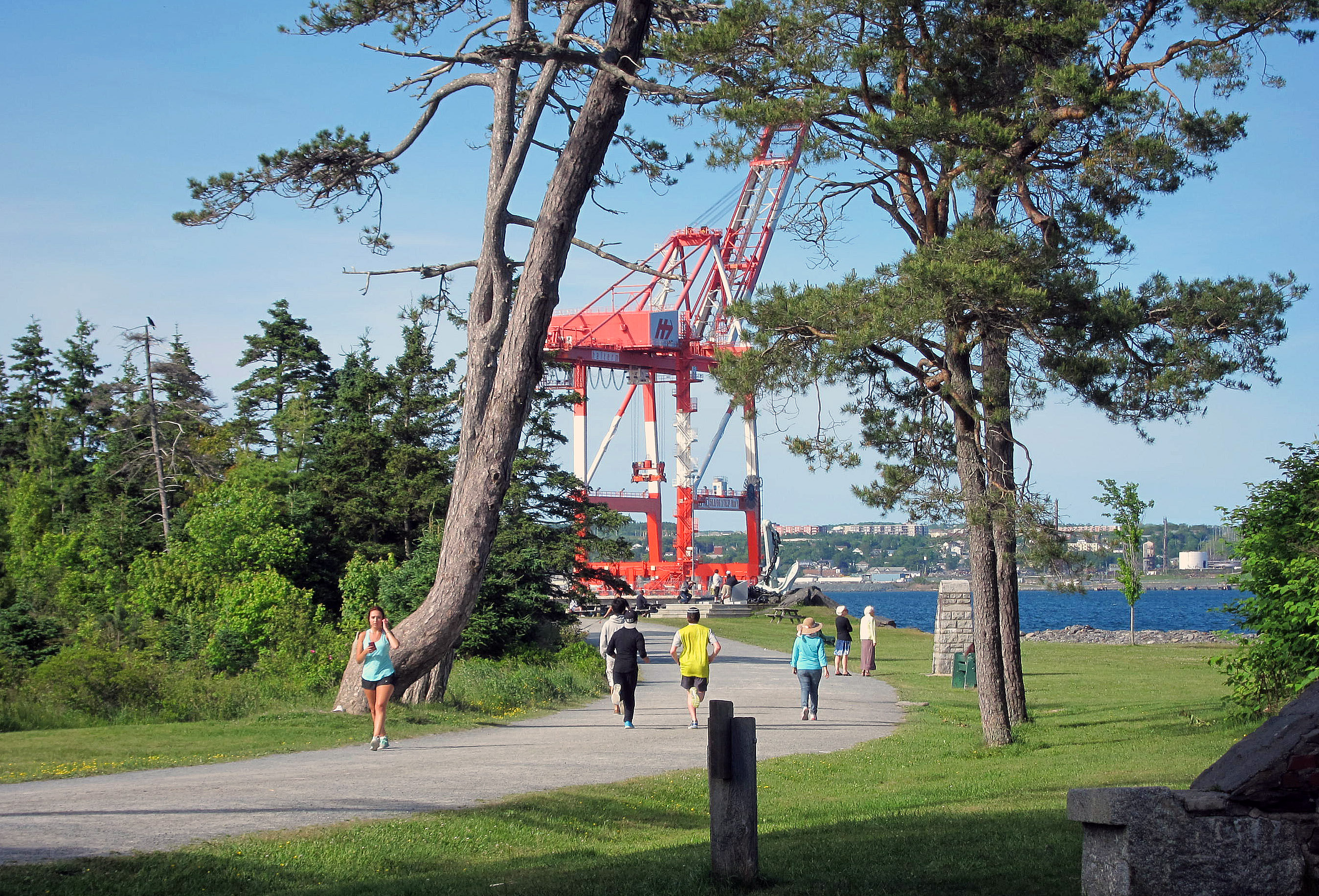
Point Pleasant Park

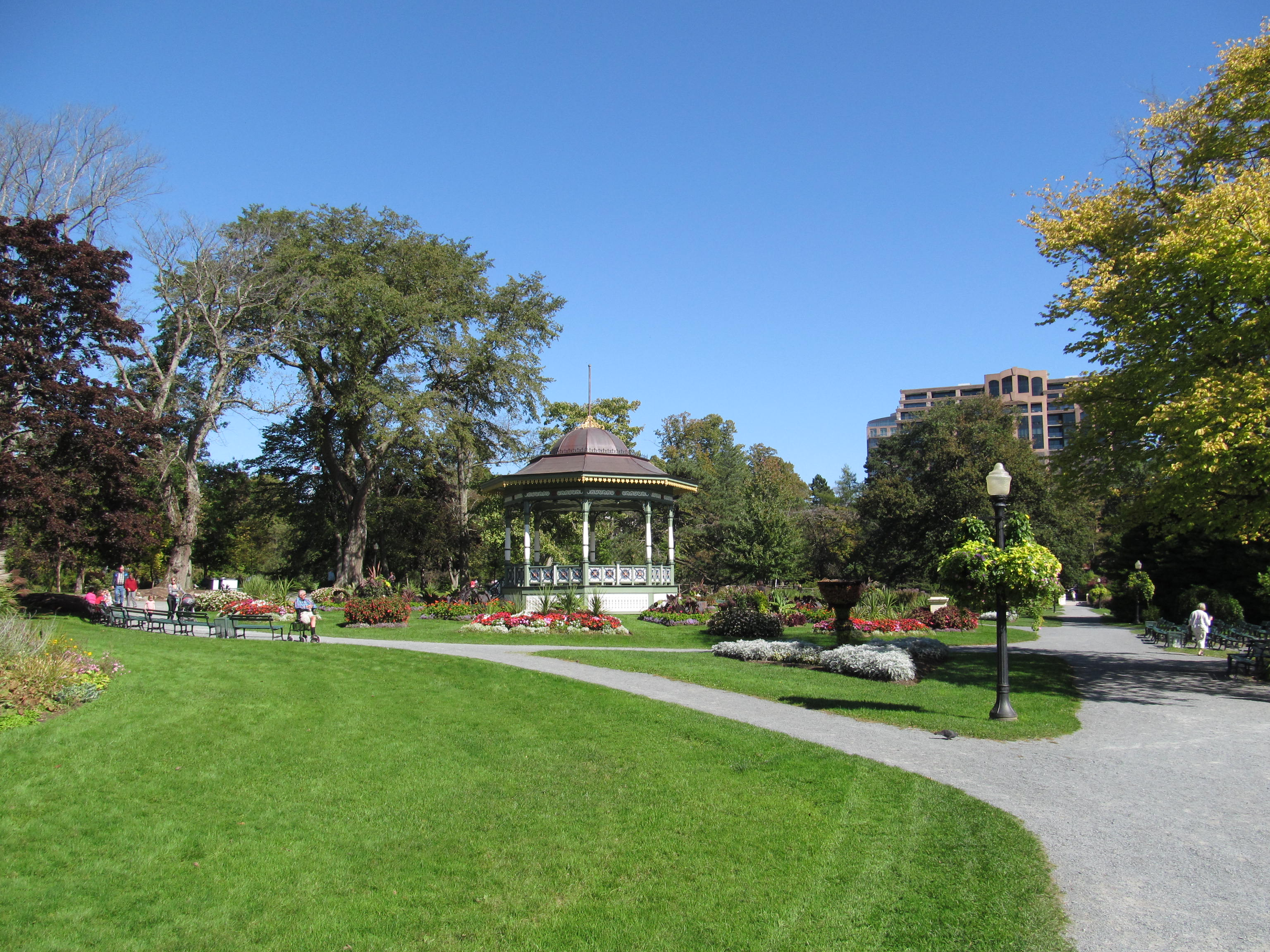
Halifax Public Gardens

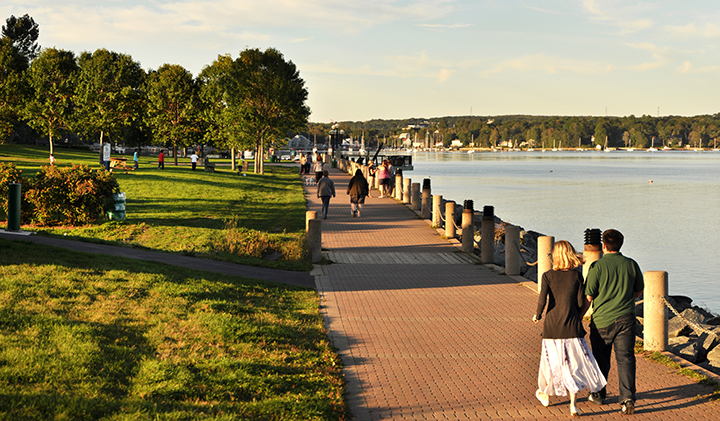
Dewolf Park

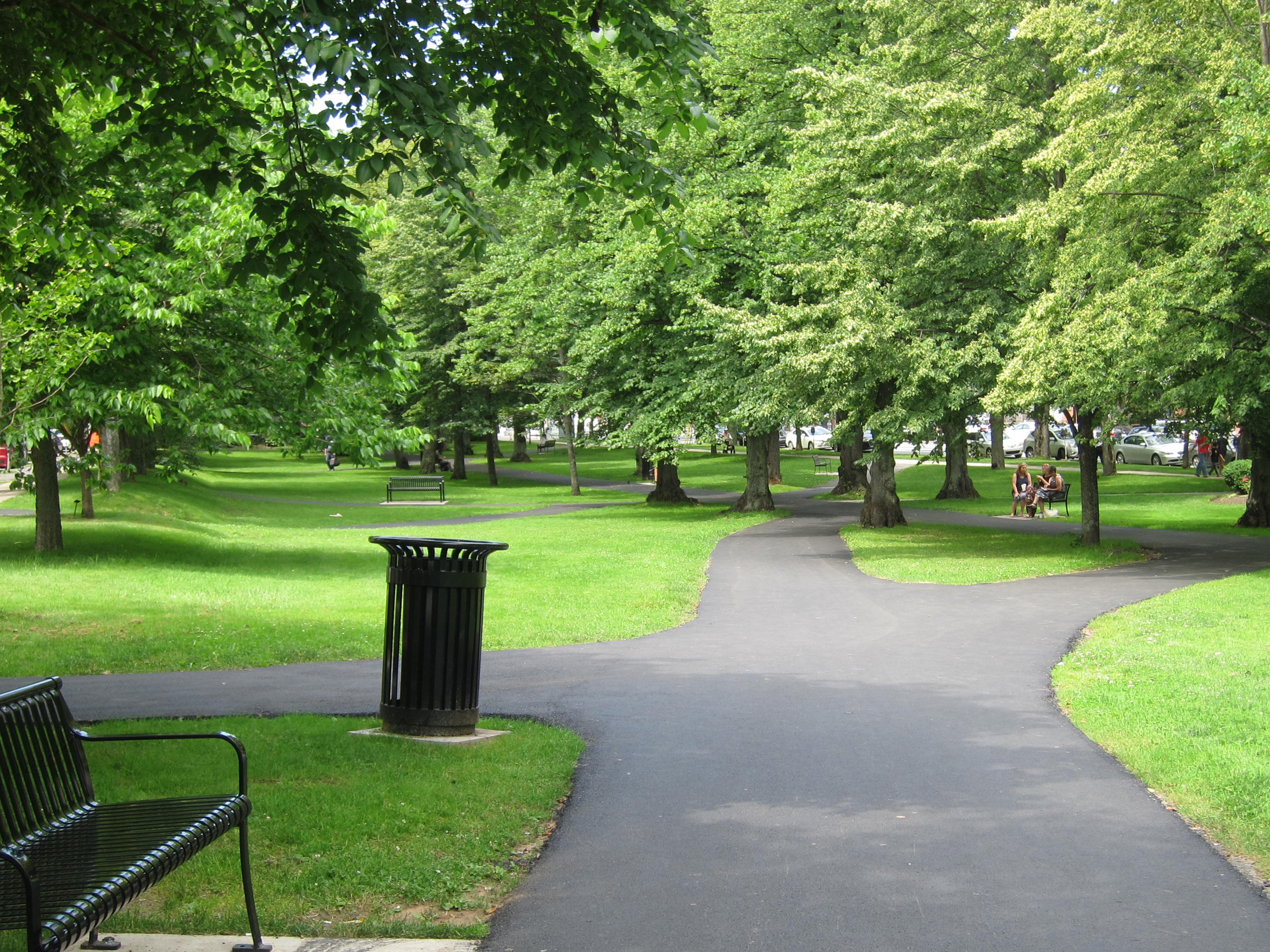
Victoria Park

The Halifax Regional Municipality has a number of parks and recreation areas in urban and rural settings.

== Urban and suburban parks ==
Park	Address	Neighbourhood	Community	Coordinates	Land area	Notes	References
Admiral's Cove Park	18 Snowy Owl Drive	East Bedford	Bedford	44°43′1.8″N 63°39′6″W			
Africville Park	5795 Africville Road	North End	Halifax	44°40′29.7″N 63°37′7″W	1 ha (2.5 acres)		
Albro Lake Park	1 Sea King Drive	Albro Lake	Dartmouth	44°41′10.6″N 63°34′31.9″W	1.9 ha (4.7 acres)		
Arnold Whitworth Park	Chadwick Street-Whitworth Street	Southdale	Dartmouth	44°39′33.09″N 63°32′52.53″W			
Beazley Park	50 Caledonia Road	Westphal	Dartmouth	44°41′14.7″N 63°31′56.8″W			
Bell Lake Park	Dorothea Drive	Ellenvale	Dartmouth	44°40′37.2″N 63°30′34.9″W			
Birch Cove Park	44 Oakdale Crescent	Crichton Park	Dartmouth	44°40′46.6″N 63°33′42.3″W			
Bissett Lake Park	348 Colby Drive	Colby Village	Cole Harbour	44°39′30.2″N 63°27′47.3″W	20.4 ha (50 acres)		
Brownlow Park	32 Bow Street	Manor Park	Dartmouth	44°40′18.1″N 63°32′36.3″W	2.5 ha (6.2 acres)		
Charlie Park		West Bedford	Bedford	44°47′19.2″N 63°36′45.6″W			
Ashley Cheeseman Memorial Park			Lakeside	44°40′34.8″N 63°35′28″W	0.8 ha (2.0 acres)		
Chocolate Lake		Melville Cove	Halifax	44°38′18.5″N 63°37′25.3″W	1.6 ha (4.0 acres)		
Mary Clayton Memorial Park	274 Willett Street	West Clayton Park	Clayton Park				
Conrose Park (The Horsefields)	6510 Jubilee Road	South End	Halifax	44°38′19.7″N 63°36′4.3″W			
Admiral Harry DeWolf Park	150 Waterfront Drive	Central Bedford	Bedford	44°42′59.1″N 63°40′15″W			
Ferry Terminal Park	88 Alderney Drive	Downtown	Dartmouth	44°39′47.8″N 63°34′4″W			
Halifax Common	5816 Cogswell Street	Central	Halifax	44°38′57.86″N 63°35′21.39″W	19 ha (47 acres)		
Crathorne Park	4 Jamieson Street	Harbourview	Dartmouth	44°40′12.7″N 63°35′4.8″W			
Deadman's Island Park	24 Pinehaven Drive		Melville Cove	44°38′5.95″N 63°36′36.09″W			
Eastern Passage Common	110 Oceanview School Road		Eastern Passage	44°36′29.1″N 63°28′29.5″W	29 ha (72 acres)		
Findley Community Centre Park	26 Elliot Street	Manor Park	Dartmouth	44°40′19.3″N 63°33′38.8″W			
Flinn Park	6990 Armview Avenue	South End	Halifax	44°38′30.3″N 63°36′46.1″W			
Cole Harbour Common	Auburn Drive	Forest Hills	Cole Harbour	44°41′5.2″N 63°29′18″W			
Farrell Street Park	Farrell Street	Harbourview	Dartmouth	44°40′33.9″N 63°35′23.2″W	1.41 ha (3.5 acres)		
Sir Sandford Fleming Park	260 Dingle Road	South Armdale	Armdale	44°37′41.1″N 63°36′7.2″W	38.44 ha (95.0 acres)		
Gorsebrook Park		South End	Halifax	44°38′03.8″N 63°34′55.9″W	7.68 ha (19.0 acres)		
Kiwanis Grahams Cove Park	45 Grahams Grove	Grahams Cove	Dartmouth	44°40′51.6″N 63°32′59.8″W	2.19 ha (5.4 acres)		
Graves-Oakley Memorial Park	104 Leiblin Drive	Northern Leiblin Park	Leiblin Park	44°35′48.6″N 63°37′37.4″W			
Hemlock Ravine Park	40 Kent Avenue	Kent Park	Halifax	44°41′20.9″N 63°40′3.3″W	80.93 ha (200.0 acres)		
Horseshoe Island Park	6936 Tupper Grove	West End	Halifax	44°38′23″N 63°36′46.6″W			
Jason MacCullough Park	102 Pinecrest Drive	Albro Lake/Highfield Park	Dartmouth				
Larry O'Connell Field	6729 Chebucto Road	West End	Halifax	44°38′45.2″N 63°36′31.4″W	1.05 ha (2.6 acres)		
Mainland Common	210 Thomas Raddall Drive	West Clayton Park	Clayton Park	44°39′24.9″N 63°39′46.3″W	2.02 ha (5.0 acres)		
Maybank Park	1115 Micmac Boulevard	Crichton Park	Dartmouth	44°41′8.1″N 63°34′1.2″W			
Merv Sullivan Park	Kencrest Avenue-Novalea Drive-Newbery Street	North End	Halifax	44°40′16.9″N 63°36′39.1″W			
Miller's Mountain Park	13 Cranbrook Street	Westphal	Dartmouth	44°41′28.9″N 63°32′27.6″W			
Northbrook Park	1 Chapman Street	Harbourview	Dartmouth	44°40′30.8″N 63°34′54.3″W			
Oat Hill Lake Park	Beckfoot Drive-Bow Street-Cranston Avenue-Fairfield Avenue-Lorne Avenue-	Manor Park	Dartmouth				
Oleary Drive Park	Oleary Drive	South Beaver Bank	Beaver Bank	44°48′26.1″N 63°40′13.2″W			
Owl's Nest Island	On Lake Micmac	Crichton Park-Westphal	44°41′19.5″N 63°33′3.5″W				
Peace and Friendship Park	Hollis Street	South End	Halifax	44°38′23″N 63°34′10.4″W	0.79 ha (2.0 acres)		
Penhorn Lake Beach Park	70 Penhorn Drive	Manor Park	Dartmouth	44°40′32.3″N 63°32′22.8″W			
Perrin Drive Park	off Perrin Drive	West Miller Lake	Fall River	44°49′41.9″N 63°35′1.4″W			
Pinehill Lookoff Park				44°41′16″N 63°35′6″W			
Point Pleasant Park	5530 Point Pleasant Drive	South End	Halifax	44°37′22″N 63°34′9″W	75 ha (190 acres)		
Public Gardens	Spring Garden Road & Summer Street	Downtown	Halifax	44°38′34″N 63°34′56″W	6.5 ha (16 acres)		
Russell Lake Park		North, West Russell Lake	West Russell Lake	44°40′6.2″N 63°31′34.1″W			
Sandy Lake Park	110 Smiths Road	North Bedford	Bedford	44°44′10.5″N 63°41′42.6″W			
Saunders Park	off Chebucto Road	West End	Halifax	44°38′45.2″N 63°36′40″W			
Schwarzwald Park	291 Howe Avenue	Central Fall River	Fall River	44°50′6.5″N 63°35′55.4″W			
Shubie Park	54 Locks Road	Montebello	Dartmouth	44°42′5.3″N 63°33′26.7″W	16 ha (40 acres)		
Cyril Smith Golden Acres Park		Lancaster Ridge	Dartmouth	44°41′26.9″N 63°34′31.2″W			
Sullivan's Pond	Crichton Avenue-Hawthorne Street-Ochterloney Street-Prince Albert Road	Downtown	Dartmouth	44°40′18.8″N 63°33′48″W	2 ha (4.9 acres)		
Tremont Plateau Park	57 Eliza Ritchie Crescent	Bridgeview	Rockingham	44°40′30.8″N 63°39′23.6″W			
Victoria Park	5720 Spring Garden Road	Downtown	Halifax	44°38′27.9″N 63°34′46.6″W	0.8 ha (2.0 acres)		
J. Albert Walker Sports Field	51 Mountain Road	Central Cowie Hill	Cowie Hill	44°37′42.4″N 63°37′28.2″W			
Yetter Park	285 Windmill Road	Harbourview	Dartmouth	44°40′34.8″N 63°35′28″W			

== Wilderness areas ==
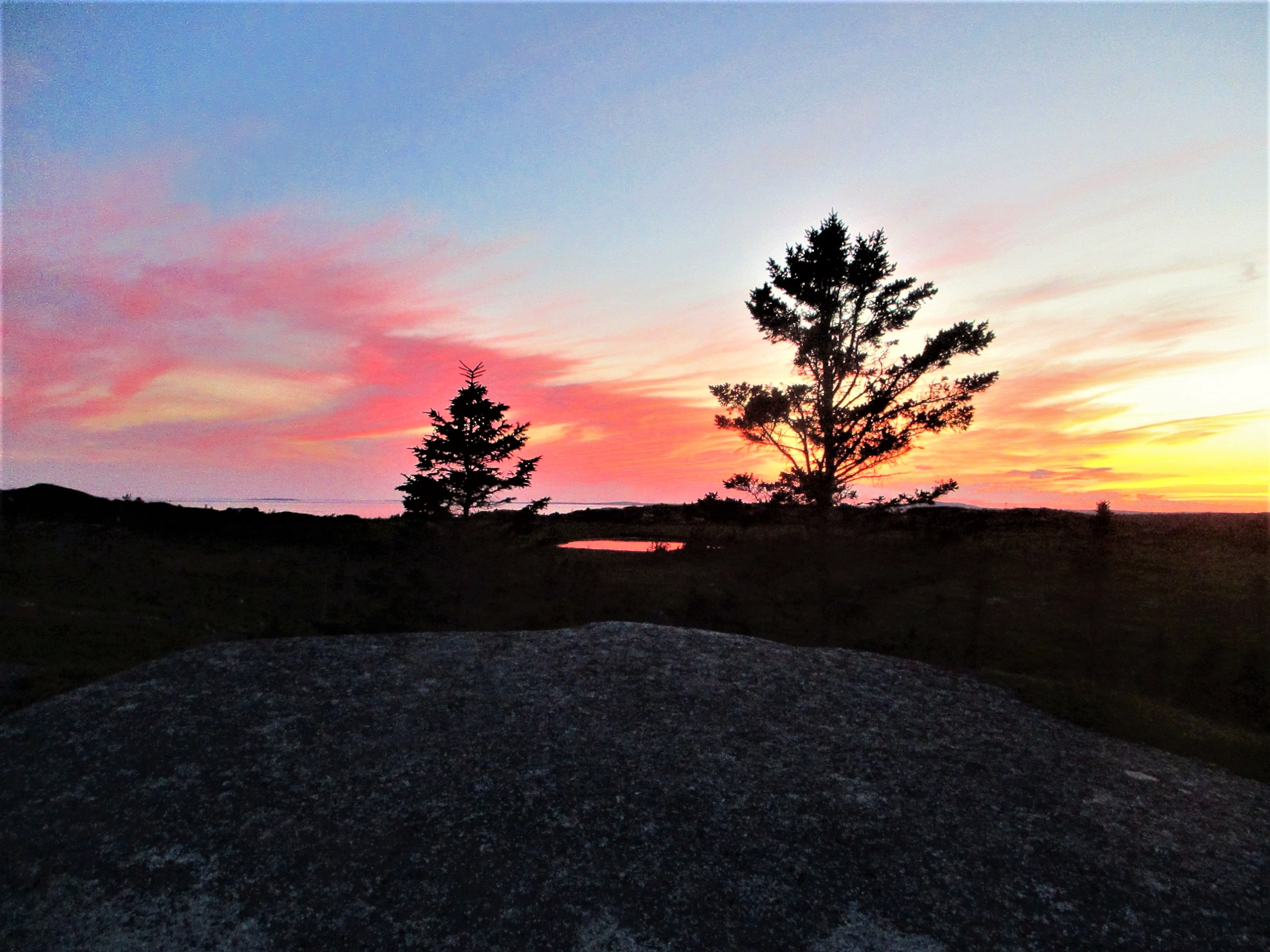
Peggys Cove Preservation Area

- Blue Mountain-Birch Cove Lakes Wilderness Area
- Boggy Lake Wilderness Area 45°5′21″N 62°18′36″W
- Clattenburgh Brook Wilderness Area 44°51′54.7″N 63°24′53.1″W
- Peggys Cove Preservation Area44°29′55.8″N 63°55′4.6″W
- Ship Harbour Long Lake Wilderness Area 44°50′17″N 63°04′32″W
- Tangier Grand Lake Wilderness Area 44°52′26.5″N 62°48′20.2″W
- Terence Bay Wilderness Area 44°32′45.2″N 63°41′6.6″W
- Waverley-Salmon River Long Lake Wilderness Area 44°47′17″N 63°27′37″W
- White Lake Wilderness Area 44°51′28.7″N 63°9′30″W

== Game sanctuaries ==
- Liscomb Game Sanctuary 45°5′0″N 62°25′54″W
- Waverley Game Sanctuary 44°49′29″N 63°32′10″W

== National parks ==
- Sable Island National Park Reserve 43°57′00″N 59°54′57″W

== Provincial parks ==
- Clam Harbour Beach Provincial Park 44°43′53″N 62°53′28″W
- Cleveland Beach Provincial Park 44°39′5″N 63°59′59″W
- Cole Harbour -Lawrencetown Coastal Heritage Park System
  - Salt Marsh Trail 44°40′6.6″N 63°25′21.6″W
  - Lawrencetown Beach Provincial Park 44°38′39″N 63°20′27″W
  - Rainbow Haven Beach Provincial Park 44°38′58″N 63°25′4″W
- Crystal Crescent Beach Provincial Park 44°27′36″N 63°37′12″W
- Dollar Lake Provincial Park 44°55′49″N 63°19′7″W
- Elderbank Provincial Park 44°58′49″N 63°12′58″W
- Gibraltar Rock Provincial Park Reserve44°48′16.73″N 63°10′29.97″W
- Herring Cove Provincial Park Reserve
- Laurie Provincial Park 44°53′2″N 63°36′6″W
- Lewis Lake Provincial Park 44°41′21″N 63°50′46″W
- Long Lake Provincial Park 44°37′2.89″N 63°38′7.03″W
- Martinique Beach Provincial Park 44°41′34″N 63°7′50″W
- McCormack Beach Provincial Park 44°36′28.4″N 63°29′32.3″W
- McNabs Island Provincial Park 44°37′0″N 63°31′57″W
- Moose River Gold Mines Provincial Park 44°58′52″N 62°56′27″W
- Musquodoboit Valley Provincial Park 45°3′18″N 63°6′44″W
- Oakfield Provincial Park 44°54′55″N 63°35′14″W
- Porters Lake Provincial Park 44°41′16″N 63°18′5″W
- Powder Mill Lake Provincial Park 44°46′29″N 63°36′38″W
- Queensland Beach Provincial Park 44°38′8″N 64°1′35″W
- Taylors Head Provincial Park 44°49′22″N 62°34′30″W
- William E. Degarthe Provincial Park 44°29′37″N 63°54′51″W

== Rural ==
- Kidstone Lake/ Rockingstone Park 44°35′48.3″N 63°37′8.3″W
- Moser River Seaside Park 44°58′19.7″N 62°15′15.1″W
- Oceanic Drive Park 44°38′47.5″N 63°19′49.2″W
- Second Lake 44°46′12.9″N 63°38′54.6″W
- West River Sheet Harbour Picnic Park 44°55′40.1″N 62°32′48.7″W

== National historic sites ==
- Halifax Citadel National Historic Site (The Citadel)44°38.9′N 63°34.8′W
- Fort Charlotte National Historic Site 44°38′28.6″N 63°33′35″W
- Fort McNab National Historic Site 44°36′0.8″N 63°30′53.5″W
- York Redoubt National Historic Site 44°35′47.7″N 63°33′8.78″W
- Prince of Wales Tower National Historic Site of Canada 44°37′15″N 63°34′5″W

== Trails ==
- Atlantic View Trail 44°38′41.2″N 63°20′7.5″W
- Beechville Lakeside Timberlea Rails to Trails 44°39′59.3″N 63°46′35.2″W
- Bissett Road Trail 44°38′10.7″N 63°27′23.3″W
- Blueberry Run Trail 44°40′5.3″N 63°15′38.6″W
- Chain of Lakes Trail
- Dartmouth Harbourfront Walkway 44°39′17.9″N 63°33′9.4″W
- DeWolfe Park Boardwalk 44°42′55.4″N 63°40′18.2″W
- Fort Sackville Walkway44°44′29.8″N 63°39′31.6″W
- Frog Pond Trail 44°37′33.4″N 63°36′13.6″W
- Little Sackville River Greenway 44°43′48″N 63°39′42.5″W
- Lake Charles, Nova Scotia Trail 44°42′54.1″N 63°33′6.9″W
- Mainland North Linear Parkway 44°39′38.3″N 63°39′40.2″W
- McCurdy Woodlot Trails 45°2′58.7″N 63°8′39.5″W
- Moser River Interpretive Trail 44°57′27.3″N 62°14′55″W
- Musquodoboit Trail System 44°47′37.1″N 63°9′2.1″W
- Nova Scotia Coastal Water Trail 44°38′27.1″N 64°4′1.1″W
- Old Annapolis Road Hiking Trail 44°41′52.2″N 63°53′17.1″W
- Pennant Point Trail 44°26′52.1″N 63°37′23.2″W
- Polly's Cove Trail 44°29′24.5″N 63°53′24.7″W
- Portland Lakes Trail 44°40′7.2″N 63°31′38.1″W
- Salmon River Trail 44°45′44.4″N 63°24′0.5″W
- Salt Marsh Trail 44°40′6.6″N 63°25′21.6″W
- Spider Lake Trail 44°44′46.4″N 63°32′19.2″W
