= Burnside Drive =

Road in Dartmouth, Nova Scotia

Coordinates: 44°42′20.93″N 63°35′10.65″W

Burnside Drive is a four-lane divided roadway, with a speed limit of 80 km/h, that serves the Burnside Business Park in the Halifax Regional Municipality (HRM) community of Dartmouth, Nova Scotia. The road parallels Highway 118, running north from exit 3 of Highway 111 to Akerley Boulevard, a western extension of Highway 107. Although some maps produced by the province show Burnside Drive, as well as a portion of Akerley Boulevard, as part of Highway 107, these roads are actually maintained by the HRM, and Highway 107 becomes Akerley Boulevard about halfway between Highway 118 and Burnside Drive.

== History ==
Burnside Drive, between Highway 111 and Akerley Boulevard, opened to traffic during the 1980/81 fiscal year.

As part of the Sackville-Bedford-Burnside Connector project, commonly known as the Burnside Expressway, Burnside Drive is being extended northward by approximately 1.2 km to meet the new expressway, which is an extension of Highway 107. Tree-clearing began in 2019, and construction is scheduled to be completed in late 2023.

== Intersections ==
- Akerley Boulevard (becomes Highway 107)
- Wright Avenue
- Commodore Drive/Ronald Smith Avenue
- Highway 111 at exit 3

Preceded by Hwy 111	Burnside Drive; Nova Scotia	Succeeded by Akerley Boulevard Hwy 107
