= Dartmouth Crossing =

- Urban Neighbourhood
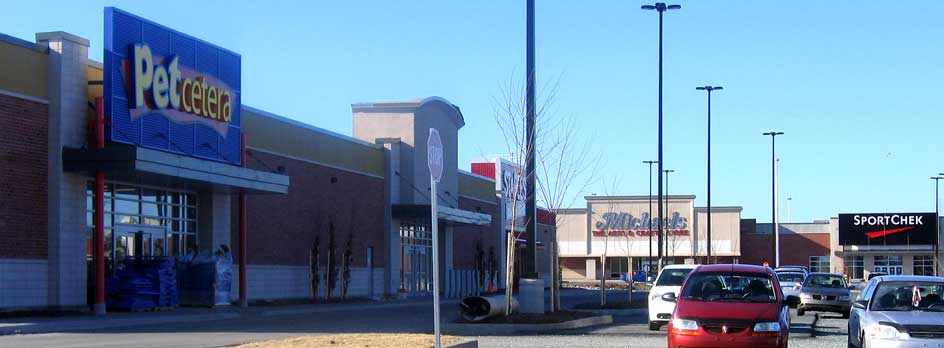
- Picture of a store in Dartmouth Crossing

- Location within Nova Scotia
- Country: Canada
- Province: Nova Scotia
- Municipality: Halifax Regional Municipality
- Community: Dartmouth
- Community council: Harbour East - Marine Drive Community Council
- District: 6 - Harbourview - Burnside - Dartmouth East

Area
  - Total: 2.07 km^{2} (0.80 sq mi)
- Postal code: B3B
- Telephone Exchanges: 902 468
- GNBC code: CAFMT

Dartmouth Crossing is a commercial real estate development in Dartmouth, a part of Halifax Regional Municipality, Nova Scotia, Canada.

== Background ==
Dartmouth Crossing is a C$280 million commercial development owned by North American Development Group. When it was first being developed, it was the largest retail construction project in Canada east of Calgary.

It is located north of the interchange between Highway 111 and Highway 118 in Dartmouth. The centre is adjacent to the Burnside Industrial Park, the largest business park in Atlantic Canada.

The site comprises 207 hectares (511 acres), and more than 81 hectares (200 acres) will be allotted to its retail component. By 2009, Dartmouth Crossing is anticipated to contain approximately 204,000 square metres (2.2 million square ft) of retail space. When it is fully built-out, the centre will contain an additional 46,500 square metres (500,000 sq ft) of hotel and office space, and will provide as many as 15,000 jobs.

The site is bisected by two waterways, Grassy and Frenchman's Brooks, and contains a number of walking and cycling trails that connect the centre to Burnside Park, nearby Shubie Park and residential areas in the vicinity.

== Shops and businesses ==
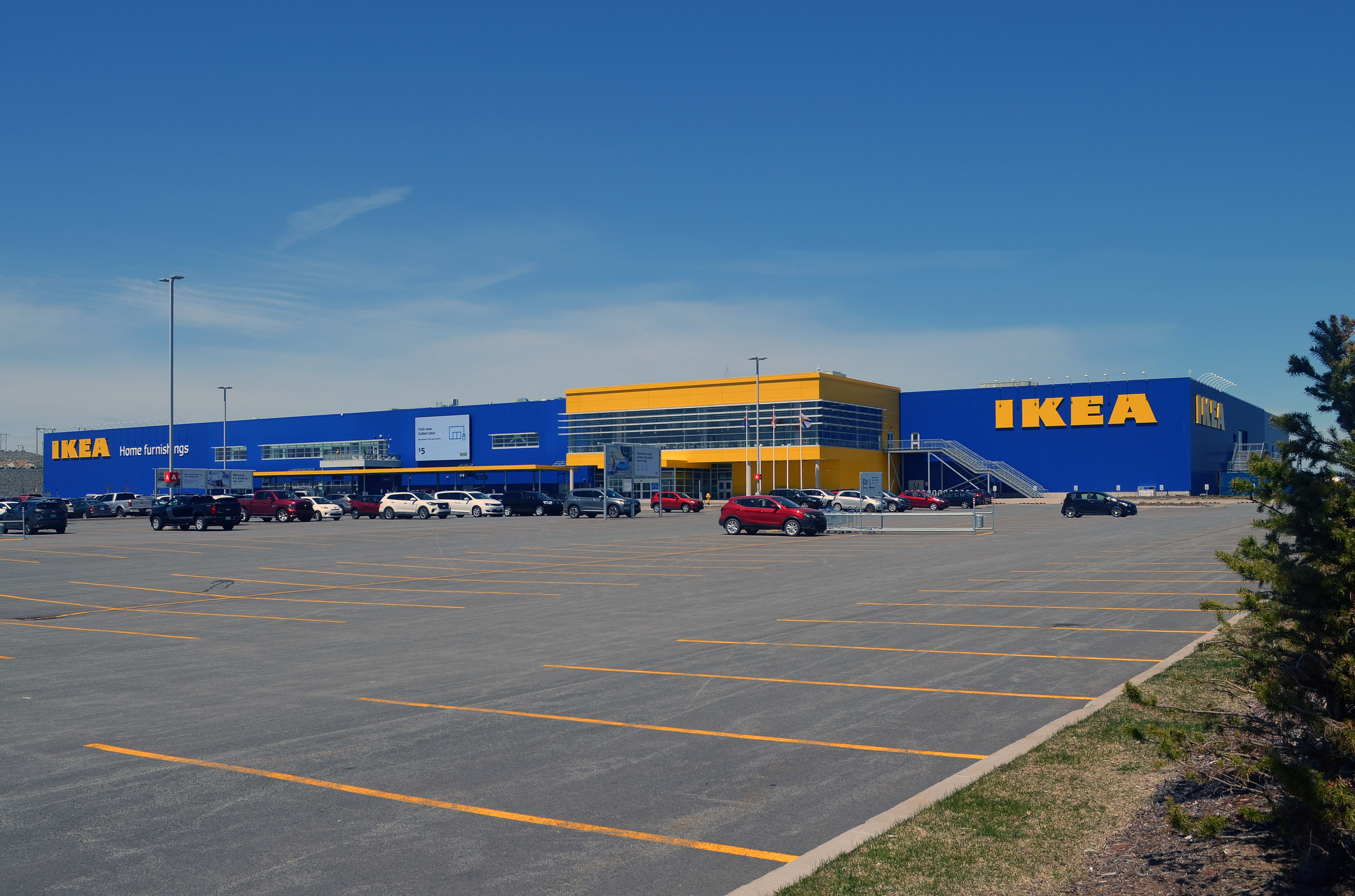
IKEA Halifax, pictured in 2019

Once completed, Dartmouth Crossing will consist of four components:

- A "big box" district, made up of large and medium retailers, including the largest Canadian Tire store in Nova Scotia;
- A "main street" district containing smaller, fashion-oriented stores, known as 'The Village Shops at Dartmouth Crossing';
- An entertainment district containing restaurants and anchored by a 12-screen Cineplex Cinemas movie theatre. The movie theatre had been owned by Empire Theatres and Famous Players.
- A district containing businesses, including banks and gas stations, intended to serve the nearby business park.
- A residential area.

Dartmouth Crossing is connected to Burnside Industrial Park directly via Commodore Drive and indirectly via Wright Avenue.

Overall, the centre is planned to house 20 big box stores, 40 shops, 15 boutiques, 20 restaurants, 10 service uses, two hotels, a movie theatre and 9,300 square metres (100,000 sq ft) of office space.

Anchor tenants of Dartmouth Crossing include IKEA, Walmart, Home Depot, Costco, Kent Building Supplies, Canadian Tire and Cineplex Cinemas.

== Transportation ==
Dartmouth Crossing is served by two Halifax Transit bus routes:

- 56 Dartmouth Crossing
- 72 Portland Hills

== See also ==
- Bayers Lake Business Park
