= Port Wallace, Nova Scotia =

Port Wallace
- Neighbourhood
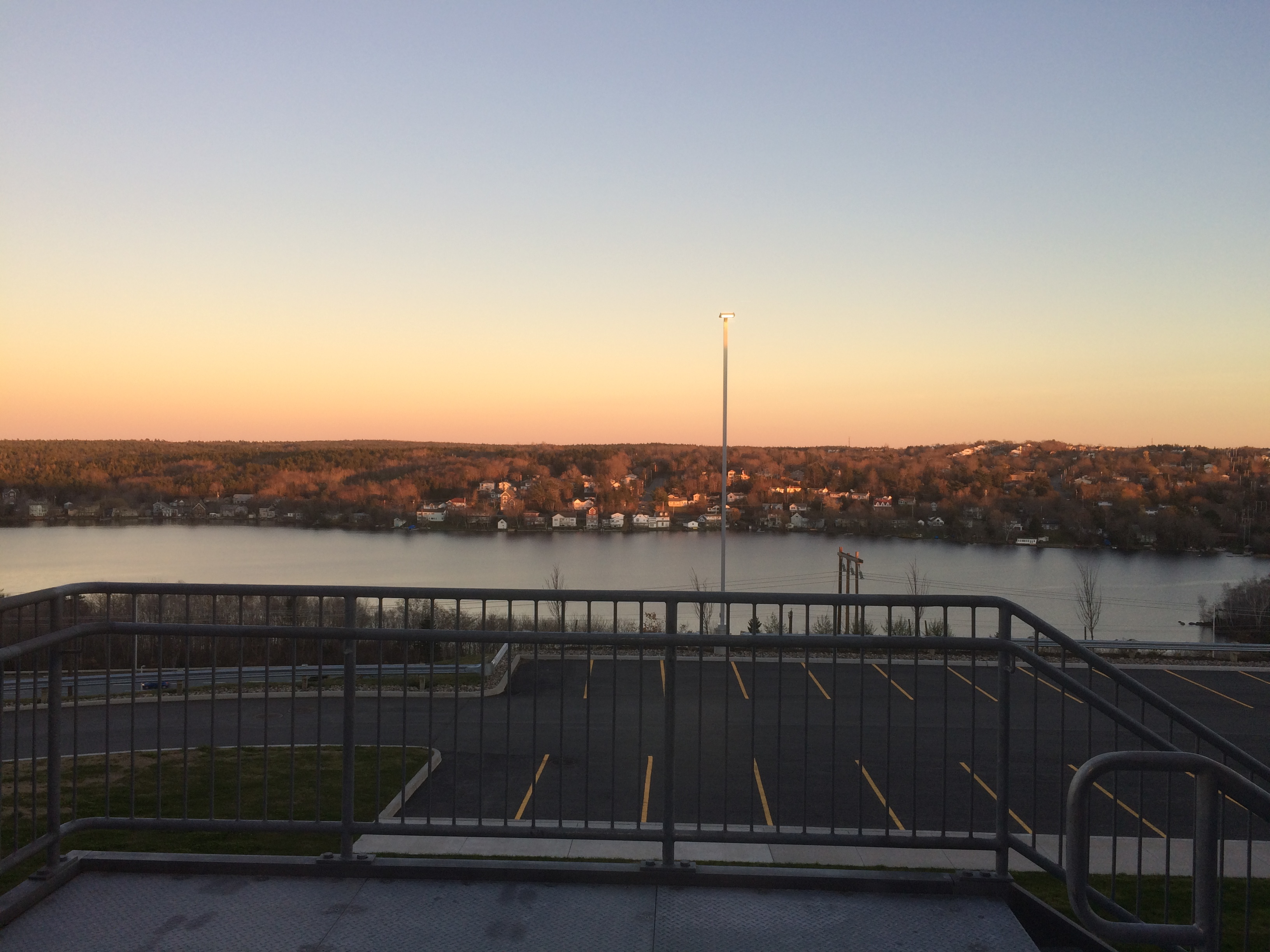
- Port Wallace viewed from the opposite side of Lake Charles
- Interactive map of Port Wallace
- Location within Nova Scotia
- Coordinates: 44°41′56″N 63°32′52″W
- Country: Canada
- Province: Nova Scotia
- Municipality: Halifax Regional Municipality
- Community: Dartmouth
- Community council: Harbour East - Marine Drive Community Council
- District: 6 - Harbourview - Burnside - Dartmouth East
- Postal code: B2W, B2X
- Area code: 902, 782
- GNBC code: CBRRA

Port Wallace is an urban locality within Halifax Regional Municipality, Nova Scotia, Canada.

It is located on the northeastern edge of the community of Dartmouth and lies midway between Lake Micmac and Lake Charles.

Its main street is Route 318, with portions being named Waverley Road and Braemar Drive. Shubie Park is a local municipal park which preserves part of the historic Shubenacadie Canal between the two lakes.

== History ==
Port Wallace was established in 1861 and is named after the Honourable Michael Wallace, a colonial administrator and former President of the Shubenacadie Canal Company. The canal's eventual completion in 1861 resulted in the present-day community being named after Wallace, who died in 1831 at the time of the canal company's bankruptcy. His legacy continues today with an elementary school in the community being named after him.

After Wallace's death, the name of the community was erroneously changed from Port Wallace to Port Wallis, after Admiral Provo Wallis. The new name was officially approved on 3 December 1953, only to be returned to the present Port Wallace on 18 February 1963.

Port Wallace was home to a Mi'kmaq village, located on the banks of Lake Micmac, close to the eventual location of the canal. Some of the most significant canal work took place around Port Wallace, and many of the canal workers resided in the camp here.

The first church established in Port Wallace was St. Andrew's Anglican Church in 1935. The following year, a church building was constructed on Locks Road, where it remains to this day. As the population increased in the late 1940s, the United Church of Canada began services led by student ministers, first in the community centre on Waverley Road in February 1950, followed by the schoolhouse in June of the same year. Eventually, the congregation bought the schoolhouse and it was converted into a proper church.
