= Nova Scotia Highway 118 =

Highway in Nova Scotia

Highway 118
- Lakeview Drive
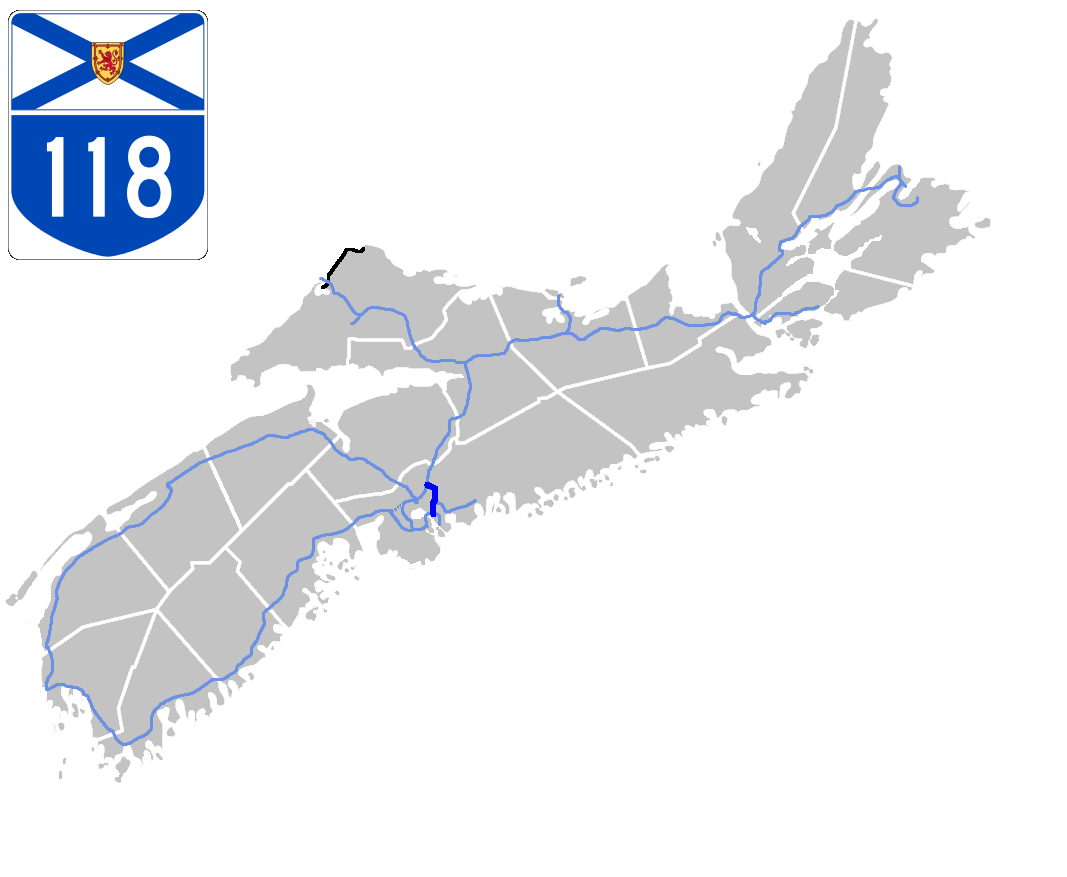

Route information
- Maintained by Nova Scotia Department of Public Works
- Length: 14.2 km (8.8 mi)
- Existed: 1971–present

Major junctions
- South end: Victoria Road in Dartmouth
- Hwy 111 near Dartmouth; Hwy 107 near Burnside
- North end: Hwy 102 near Fall River

Location
- Country: Canada
- Province: Nova Scotia

Highway system
- Provincial highways in Nova Scotia; 100-series
| ← Hwy 113 | → Hwy 125 |

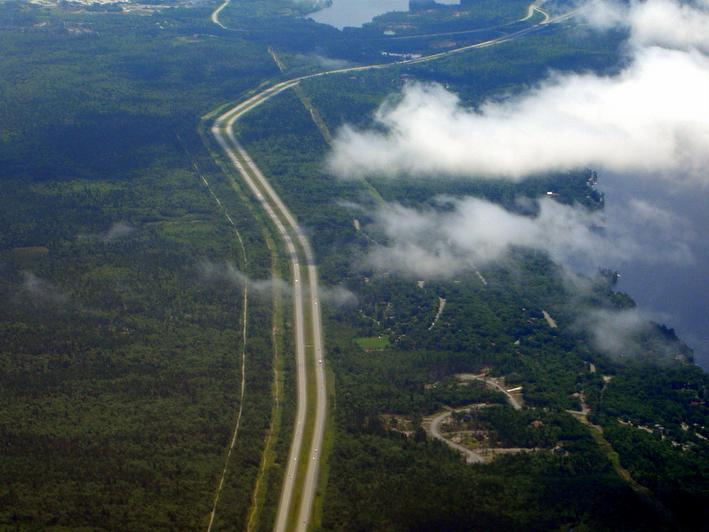
Highway 118, north of Dartmouth at the village of Waverley.

Highway 118 is a divided highway connecting Dartmouth with Highway 102 at Fall River, 14 kilometres (8.7 mi) to the north in the Canadian province of Nova Scotia.

The highway crosses the historic Shubenacadie Canal and also runs along the western shore of Lake Micmac and the western edge of Shubie Park and is known as Lakeview Drive. Running parallel to the highway from the Waverley Road to exit 14 is a portion of the Halifax Lateral of the Maritimes & Northeast Pipeline (natural gas).

The southern limit of provincial maintenance is at the Highway 111 interchange.

== History ==
Originally an undivided highway, the road opened in 1971. The southbound carriageway between Highway 102 and Dartmouth was completed during the 1979/80 fiscal year.

The interchange with Highway 107 opened in 1986/87. Originally there was no connection to Akerley Boulevard, one of the main roads in Burnside Industrial Park. During planning and construction of the interchange, the Industrial Commission and the former City of Dartmouth lobbied the province to make provision for a connection between Akerley Boulevard and Highway 118. The Akerley Boulevard access was constructed in the early 1990s.

In the early 2000s, development of the Dartmouth Crossing commercial area next to Highway 118 led to construction of the Wright Avenue interchange. The interchange was built by contractor Dexter Construction and includes a pedestrian bridge to permit access to Shubie Park.

The northbound bridge spanning the Shubenacadie Canal and Route 318 (Waverley Road), also called the "Portobello overpass", was replaced in 2024–25.

== Exit list ==
The entire route is located in Halifax Regional Municipality.

| Location | km | mi | Old exit | New exit | Destinations | Notes |
|---|---|---|---|---|---|---|
| Dartmouth | −2.8 | −1.7 | | | Victoria Road (Route 322) – Macdonald Bridge | At-grade, traffic signals; part of Woodland Avenue |
| Dartmouth | −0.9 | −0.56 | | | Micmac Boulevard, Lancaster Drive | At-grade, traffic signals |
| Dartmouth | 0.0 | 0.0 | 1 | 11 | Hwy 111 south to Trunk 7 (Main Street) / Route 318 – Eastern Shore, Eastern Passage | Southern terminus; exit 4 on Hwy 111 |
| Dartmouth | 0.0 | 0.0 | | — | Hwy 111 north to Trunk 7 – Mackay Bridge, Halifax | Southbound exit only; south end of southbound collector/express lane |
| Dartmouth | 1.0 | 0.62 | 2 | — | Commodore Drive – Dartmouth Crossing | Southbound exit and entrance |
| Dartmouth | 1.8 | 1.1 | 3 | 12 | Wright Avenue – Dartmouth Crossing, Burnside Industrial Park | North end of southbound collector/express lane |
| Dartmouth | 4.7 | 2.9 | 4 | 13 | Hwy 107 to Route 318 / Akerley Boulevard – Cole Harbour, Eastern Shore, Burnside Industrial Park | Signed as exits 13E (east) and 13W (west); exit 13 on Hwy 107 |
| Fall River | 13.6 | 8.5 | 5 | 14 | To Trunk 2 / Route 318 (Perrin Drive) – Fall River, Waverley, Wellington | Northbound exit, southbound entrance |
| Fall River | 14.2 | 8.8 | | | Hwy 102 north – Halifax International Airport, Truro | Northern terminus; northbound exit, southbound entrance |
1.000 mi = 1.609 km; 1.000 km = 0.621 mi: Closed/former; Incomplete access
