= Michael Wallace (politician) =

Canadian politician (c. 1744 – 1831)

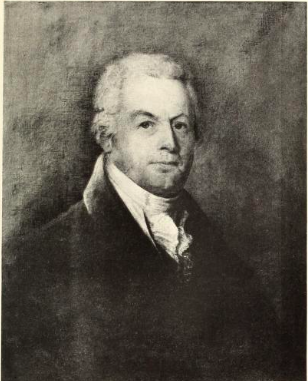
Michael Wallace by Robert Field

Michael Wallace (c. 1744 – October 8, 1831) was a Scottish-born merchant, judge and political figure in Nova Scotia. He represented Halifax County in the Nova Scotia House of Assembly from 1785 to 1802.

He was born in Lanarkshire and became a merchant in Glasgow, moving to Norfolk, Virginia in 1771. After losing his property in the American Revolution, Wallace moved to Halifax in 1779, where he became a retail and wholesale merchant, mainly importing goods from Britain. He married Mary Kerby in 1781. Wallace was named a judge in the Inferior Court of Common Pleas; he also received a number of patronage appointments and supply contracts with the military. In 1802, he was named to the Nova Scotia Council; as senior member of the council, he was called to administer the colony during absences by the lieutenant governor. For a brief time, Wallace also served as judge in the vice admiralty court. He was named surveyor general of the king's woods in 1820, following the death of John Wentworth. Wallace was president of the Shubenacadie Canal Company and a shareholder in a number of other companies. He opposed the presence of American fishing boats in the waters off the British colonies and advocated the exclusion of American trading ships from British ports in the Caribbean. He died in Halifax.

His daughter Eleanor married Charles Porter, president of King's College.

== Legacy ==
- namesake of Port Wallace, Nova Scotia
