= Blue Mountain-Birch Cove Lakes =

Wilderness area in Halifax, Nova Scotia, Canada

Blue Mountain-Birch Cove Lakes Wilderness Area
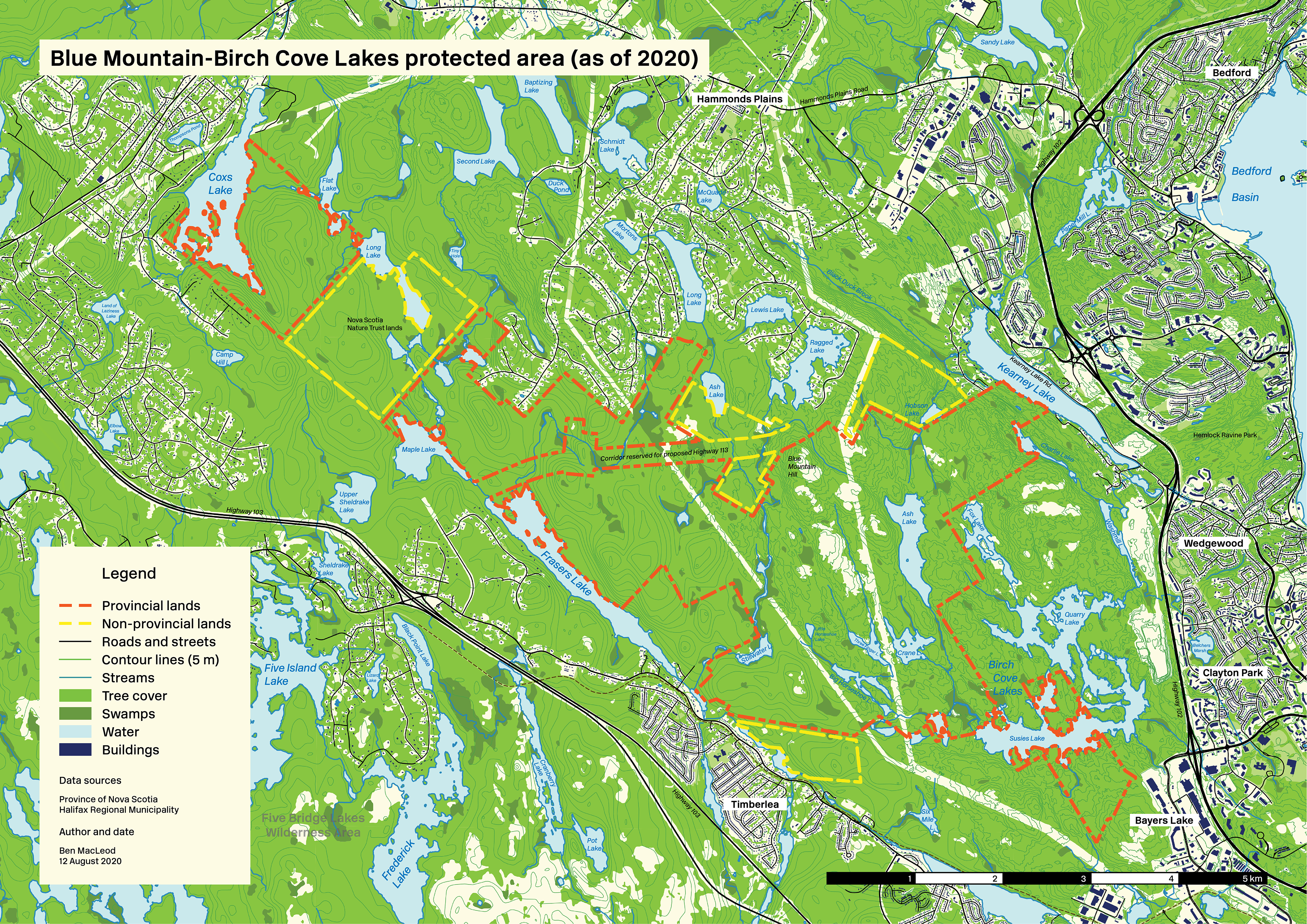
- Map of provincially owned (red) and non-provincial (yellow) protected area

- Location within Nova Scotia
- Location: Halifax, Nova Scotia
- Coordinates: 44.6765°N 63.7193°W
- Area: 1,767 ha (6.82 sq mi)
- Designated: 2009
- Owner: Province of Nova Scotia

The Blue Mountain-Birch Cove Lakes Wilderness Area is located in Halifax, Nova Scotia, Canada. Considered to be of high ecological value, it is one of 40 designated wilderness areas in the province.

The wilderness area would form the heart of the larger Blue Mountain-Birch Cove Lakes Regional Park, which has been proposed by the city since 2006.

== History ==
The Metropolitan Area Planning Committee (MAPC), a former regional planning body, identified the area in the 1970s as having high conservation value.

== Wilderness area designation ==
In 2009, the province created the Blue Mountain-Birch Cove Lakes Wilderness Area out of 1,316 hectares of Crown land.

In 2015, the wilderness area was expanded from 1,316 to 1,767 hectares.

There is a linear corridor through the wilderness area that is not protected. This is the intended alignment of Highway 113, a suburban freeway proposed by the province.

== Regional park ==
=== Conceptual plan ===
In 2006, the Halifax Regional Municipality adopted a conceptual plan to turn the area into a regional park. The wilderness area, designated in 2009 from provincially owned lands, would form the heart of this park. Major private landholders include Susie Lake Developments, The Stevens Group, and the Annapolis Group. The current municipal zoning does not permit development.

=== Development plan controversy ===
The Annapolis Group brought forward plans for a low-density subdivision in the eastern area of the conceptual regional park, and proposed that the park be made smaller to accommodate the development. An independent facilitator, Heather Robertson, released a report supportive of the developer's plans.

The report was met by an "intense backlash" from the public. It was presented by Robertson at the Future Inns in Clayton Park on 20 June 2016, where the mood was one of "great frustration and anger" and the public was not allowed to speak or ask questions. A report published by city staff on 31 August 2016 also disagreed with the report, and recommended that the lands not be developed. Regional council received more than 1,400 letters from the public, the vast majority supportive of the proposed park and critical of Robertson's report. On 6 September 2016, council voted 15-1 against allowing the development plans to proceed.

In January 2017, the Annapolis Group announced a lawsuit against the city. It claims the city "effectively expropriated" its land by rejecting the development plans and is seeking $119 million in damages as "fair compensation". The city asked the courts to dismiss the case on the basis it had no chance of success, but this request was denied by a judge in November 2019. In 2021, the Supreme Court of Canada agreed to examine the case.

=== Land acquisition ===
The Halifax Regional Municipality is acquiring land that, together with the provincial wilderness area, will form the proposed regional park. The first such purchase was made on 18 January 2018 when the city bought approximately 80 hectares (200 acres) of land around Hobson Lake from West Bedford Holdings, a private company. This land is intended to serve as a buffer area for the future park, as well as a future access point to the new park.

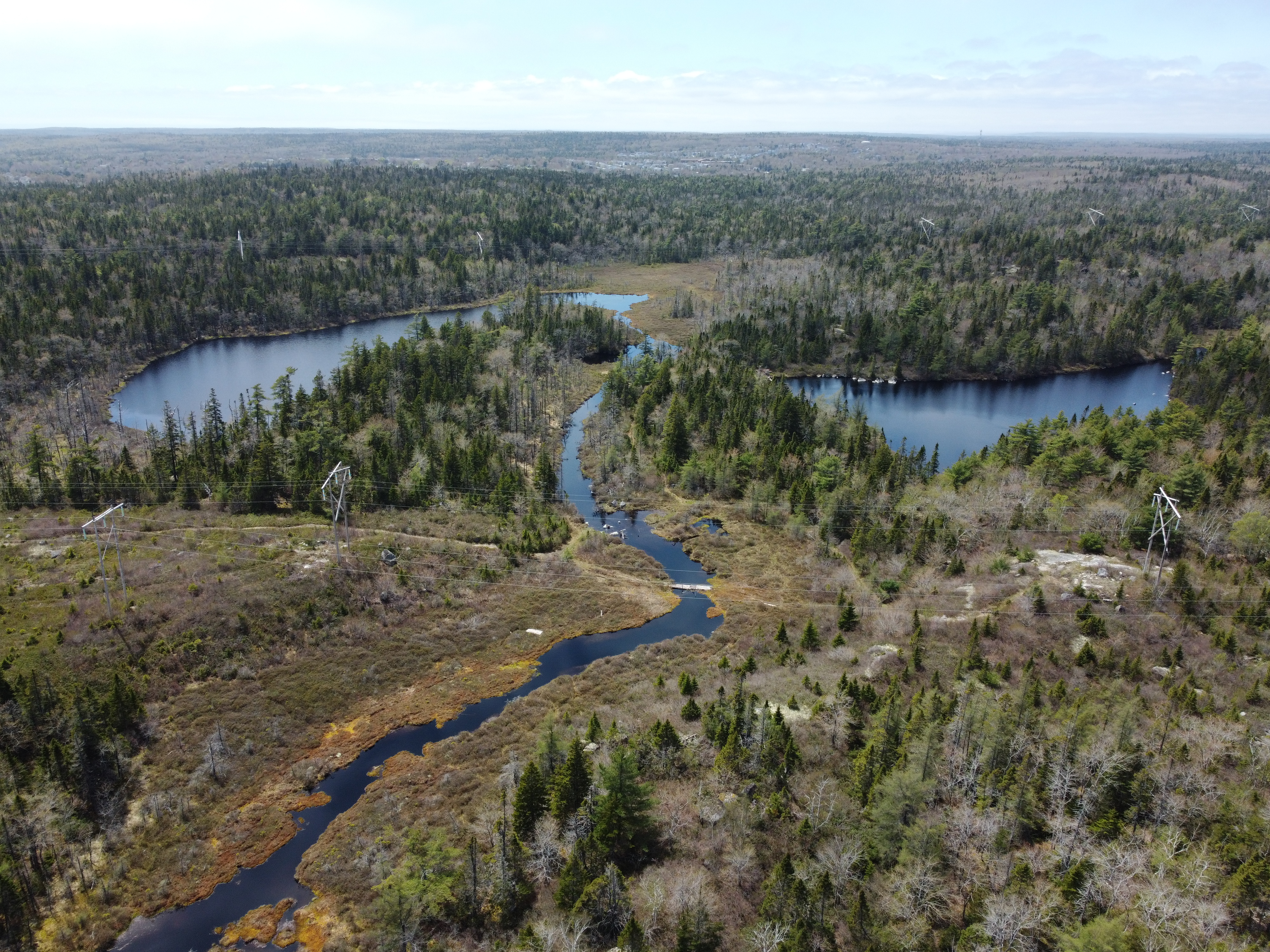
An aerial shot of two of the many small lakes in the Blue Mountain Birch Cove Lakes Wilderness Area, along with a hiking trail crossing a brook.

In March 2019, regional council approved a second land purchase for the park. The purchase included 49 hectares (120 acres) of land beside Nine Mile River in Timberlea, acquired from Armco Development, as well as 81 hectares (200 acres) near Blue Mountain, purchased from the Barrett Lumber Company. The latter acquisition is bisected by the aforementioned Highway 113 right-of-way. Forming a total of around 130 hectares (320 acres), this purchase was made with the help of a $860,000 contribution from the federal government.

=== Nova Scotia Nature Trust fundraising campaign ===
The lands protected up to late 2019 comprised two separate chunks: a larger portion in the south (subdivided by the aforementioned Highway 113 alignment), and a smaller portion to the north-west. In October 2019, the Nova Scotia Nature Trust announced a fundraising campaign that aimed to help purchase a 232-hectare (570-acre) property connecting the two chunks. The private owners of this land, Robin Wilber and Bill Fenton, agreed to donate a portion of the land's value as a charitable gift. The nature trust aimed to fundraise C$2.1 million by June 2020.

== See also ==
- Parks in Halifax, Nova Scotia
