= Shubenacadie Canal =

Manmade watercourse in Canada

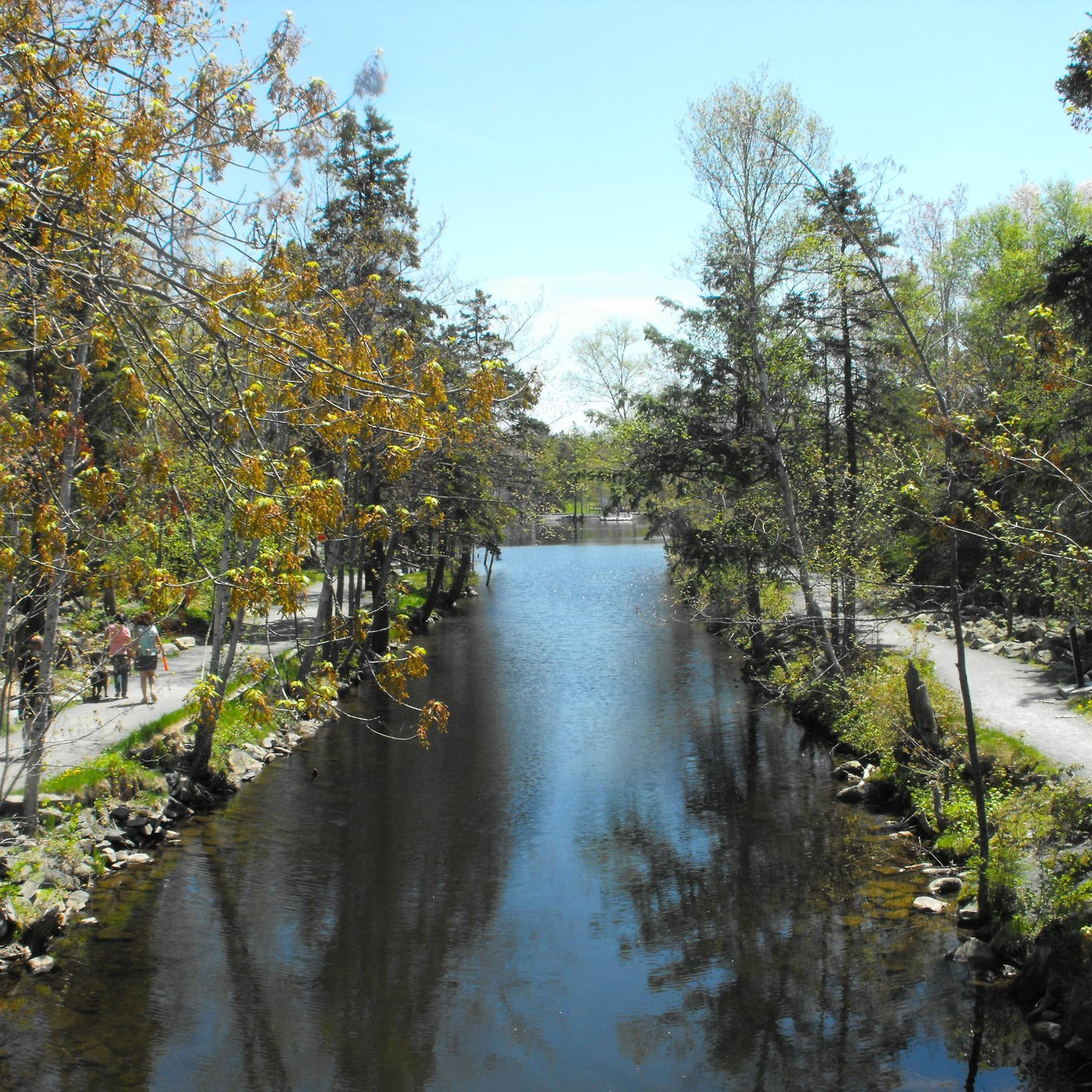
- View of Shubenacadie Canal in Shubie Park.

- Shubenacadie Canal in Nova Scotia
- Country: Canada
- Coordinates: 44°42′6.5″N 63°33′15.6″W

Specifications
- Length: 114 km (71 mi)
- Locks: 1 operational (Lock 5) (originally 9 locks & 2 inclined planes)
- Maximum height AMSL: 31 m (102 ft) at Lake Charles
- Status: Closed

History
- Original owner: Shubenacadie Canal Co.
- Principal engineer: Francis Hall
- Construction began: 1826
- Date of first use: 1856
- Date completed: 1861
- Date closed: 1871

Geography
- Direction: North/South
- Start point: Halifax Harbour (Dartmouth, Nova Scotia)
- End point: Cobequid Bay (Maitland, Nova Scotia)
- Beginning coordinates: 44.66°N 63.56°W
- Ending coordinates: 45.32°N 63.49°W

The Shubenacadie Canal is a canal in central Nova Scotia, Canada. It links Halifax Harbour with the Bay of Fundy by way of the Shubenacadie River and Shubenacadie Grand Lake. Begun in 1826, it was not completed until 1861 and was closed in 1871. Currently small craft use the river and lakes, but only one lock is operational. Three of the nine locks have been restored to preserve their unique fusion of British and North American construction techniques. More extensive restoration is planned.

== History ==
The Shubenacadie Canal was originally surveyed by William Owen in 1767 which led to the proposal of the canal 30 years later. The government of Nova Scotia commissioned Owen to follow the Shubenacadie waterway from the Atlantic Ocean to Cobequid Bay. The Shubenacadie Canal was envisioned to facilitate transportation between Halifax and the agricultural, timber and coal producing areas of northern Nova Scotia and the Annapolis Valley. Construction was started in 1826 by the Shubenacadie Canal Co. which went bankrupt in 1831. Several Scottish and Irish stonemasons had immigrated to Nova Scotia to work on the project but were left stranded in the colony with few resources after the project had halted. Construction started again in 1854 under the Inland Navigation Company. The new company altered the original British stonework lock designs to use more inexpensive North American stone and wooden construction. Steam boats and barges began to use the canal in 1856 and the entire system was completed by 1861. The canal enjoyed a few years of healthy traffic especially during the Waverley gold rushes of the 1860s. However the canal company showed little profit and experienced many problems relating to frigid winters which damaged the locks linking the freshwater lakes.

The president of the Canal company was Michael Wallace.

The canal's ongoing construction delays were partly responsible for the 1851 decision by Nova Scotia's colonial government to build the Nova Scotia Railway, which built lines from Halifax to Windsor and Truro by 1858. Railway construction created a short-term surge in canal traffic but a decision in 1870 by the Intercolonial Railway to replace the Waverley draw bridge over the canal with a fixed bridge blocked canal steamships and severely limited canal traffic, a conflict related to the frog wars which plagued rival railways crossings. A final blow was a takeover by the Town of Dartmouth of the Dartmouth Lakes for the city's water supply which ended canal operations in 1871.

== Route ==
View of Grand Lake, part of the Shubenacadie Canal system, from just above Lock 5

The community of Maitland was part of the Douglas Township until it was named Maitland after Peregrine Maitland, Lieutenant Governor of Nova Scotia (1828–34), when building the Shubenacadie Canal was first attempted (1826–1831). The canal was supposed to start at Maitland, Nova Scotia and run through the province to Maitland Street, Dartmouth, the canal being "bookended" by two "Maitland" landmarks.

The canal followed the course below, running north from Halifax Harbour at Dartmouth Cove:

- Dartmouth Cove in Dartmouth (part of Halifax Harbour)
- Dartmouth Inclined Plane (no longer present)
- Sullivan's Pond
- Lock One (partially restored)
- Lake Banook
- Lake Micmac
- Lock Two in Shubie Park (partially restored but inoperable)
- Lock Three also in Shubie Park (fully restored but inoperable)
- Lake Charles
- Porto Bello Inclined Plane (no longer present)
- Lake William
- Lake Thomas
- Lock Four (in ruins)
- Fletchers Lake
- Lock Five (fully restored and operational)
- Shubenacadie Grand Lake from Wellington Station to Frenchmans Road
- Lock Six to Nine on the Shubenacadie River from Frenchmans Road to Lantz (no longer present)
- Shubenacadie River from Lantz to Maitland
- Cobequid Bay at Port Maitland (part of Minas Basin/Bay of Fundy)

== Present use ==
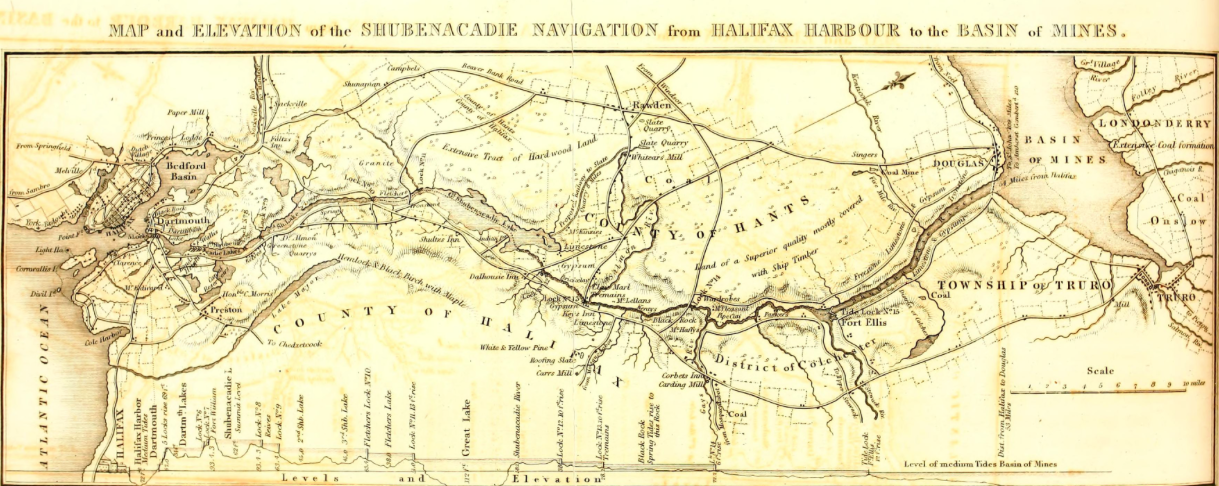
Shubenacadie Canal Map, Nova Scotia, 1831

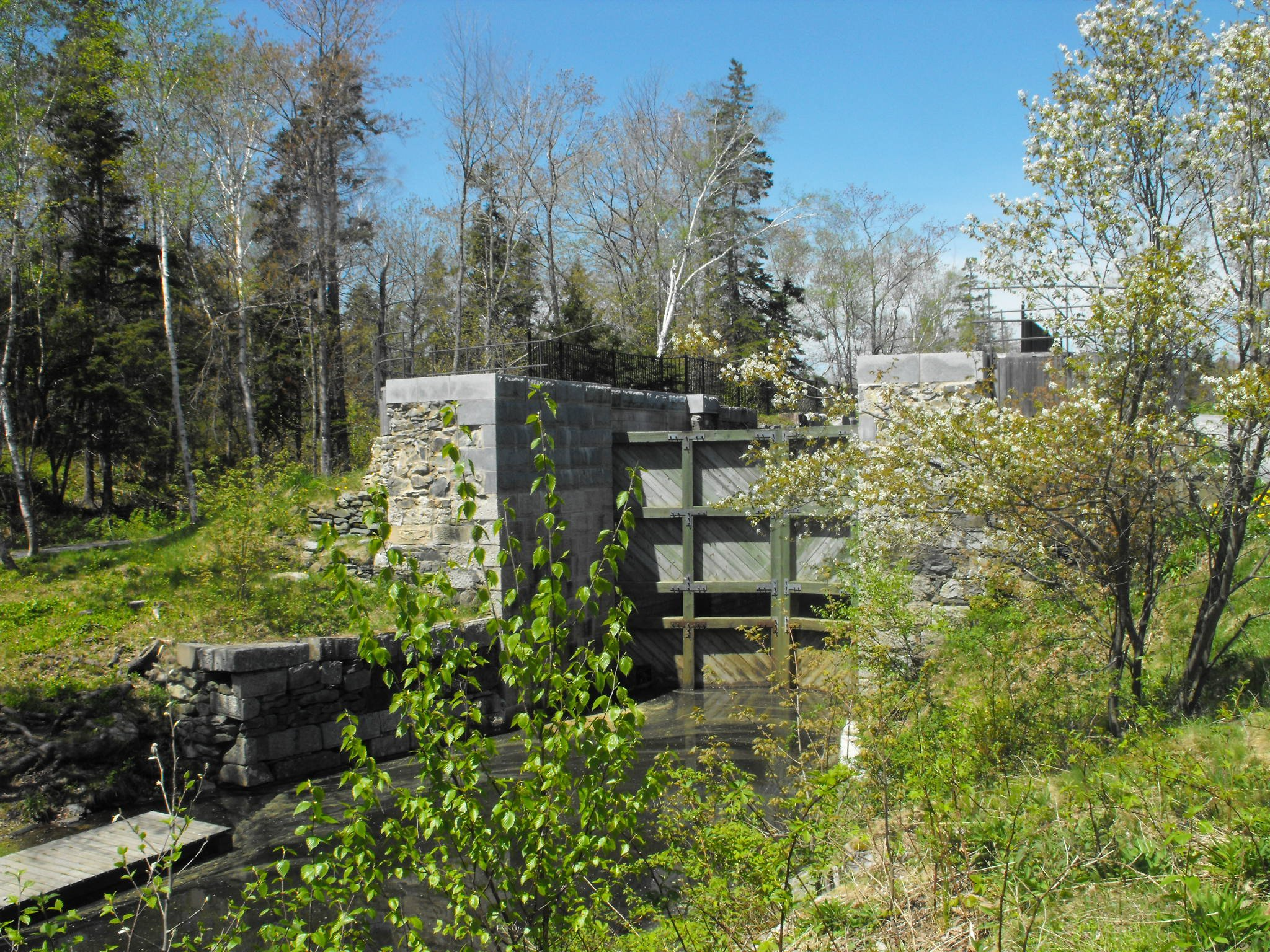
Partially restored lock

In recent decades, citizens of Dartmouth sought to restore portions of the canal's portage route between the lakes running from Halifax Harbour to Shubenacadie Grand Lake for pleasure boaters. Highway construction, notably low bridges crossing the Lake Banook-Lake Micmac connection (Highway 111) and Lake Thomas (Highway 102) resulted in blocking the historic canal route to larger vessels, although canoes and small pleasure boats may still pass underneath.

The Shubenacadie Canal Commission was established to stabilize the deterioration of the remaining locks and attempt to restore some of them to working order. An interpretive site for the canal is located in the Fairbanks Centre in Dartmouth's Shubie Park, along the shores of Lake Micmac. Located next to one of the restored operational locks, the Fairbanks Centre features a scale model of canal lock mechanisms.

Some areas along the Shubenacadie Canal are popular outdoor recreation areas for the Halifax Regional Municipality, including:

- Lake Banook's competitive paddling course
- Lake Banook's Birch Cove Beach
- Shubie Park's Dartmouth Multi-use Trail
- Laurie Provincial Park on the shore of Shubenacadie Grand Lake
- Oakfield Provincial Park on the shore of Shubenacadie Grand Lake

The Trans-Canada Trail is currently being planned to run alongside part of the canal.

== Dartmouth Crossing silt run-off ==
Local residens became concerned in 2005 when it was discovered that recurring flows of silt flowing off the Dartmouth Crossing mall project construction site were entering the canal, even after earlier mitigation measures after previous runoffs. After heavy hurricane-season rains, run-off from the construction overflowed containment ponds and began running into the canal, Lake Charles, Lake Micmac, and Shubie Park's Grassy Brook.

== See also ==
- Port Wallace, Nova Scotia, community named after the president of the Shubenacadie Canal Company
