= Lake Charles (Nova Scotia) =

Lake in Canada

- Location within Nova Scotia
- Location: Halifax Regional Municipality, Nova Scotia
- Coordinates: 44°43′11.5″N 63°32′59.9″W
- Primary outflows: Shubenacadie Canal Williams Lake 70% Lake Micmac 30%
- Basin countries: Canada
- Max. length: 3.24 km (2.01 mi)
- Max. width: 0.6 km (0.37 mi)
- Surface area: 1.46 km^{2} (0.56 sq mi)
- Average depth: 15 m (49 ft)
- Max. depth: 28 m (92 ft)
- Surface elevation: 31 m (102 ft)
- Frozen: 2 months
- Islands: 2
- Settlements: Dartmouth, Waverley

Lake Charles is a small lake in Nova Scotia’s Halifax Regional Municipality between the communities of Dartmouth and Waverley. It is situated between Port Wallace in the south and Nova Scotia Highway 107 in the North, Nova Scotia Highway 118 in the west and Nova Scotia Route 318 to the east. It is the summit of the Shubenacadie Canal, where the level of the surface is 31 m above sea level. Located in the Shubenacadie watershed, it ultimately feeds into the Bay of Fundy. However, it also feeds into Halifax Harbour through the canal locks at Shubie Park.

== Lake Charles Trail ==
The Lake Charles Trail, part of the Trans Canada Trail, runs along the western side of the lake, from Shubie Park to the Highway 107 overpass at Route 318 in Portobello. The trail is approximately 4.39 km long, and has a crusher dust surface. The trail is used year-round and is maintained by the Halifax Regional Municipality.

== Other Lake Charles in Nova Scotia ==
- Guysborough County at 45°19′11.9″N 61°3′13.9″W
