= List of highways named Highway of Heroes =

Highway of Heroes may refer to one of the following roads:

- British Columbia Highway 1 between Surrey and Abbotsford, part of the Trans-Canada Highway
- Manitoba Highway 1 between Winnipeg and CFB Shilo, part of the Trans-Canada Highway
- New Brunswick Route 2, part of the Trans-Canada Highway
- Newfoundland and Labrador Highway 1 between Veterans Memorial Highway and Peacekeepers Way, part of the Trans-Canada Highway
- Northwest Territories Highway 1, from the Alberta–Northwest Territories border to Enterprise, Northwest Territories
- Nova Scotia Highway 111, also known as the Circumferential Highway ("The Circ")
- Ontario Highway 401 between Toronto and Trenton.
- Prince Edward Island Route 1
- Saskatchewan Highway 1 between Moose Jaw and Regina, part of the Trans Canada Highway
