= Lake Micmac =

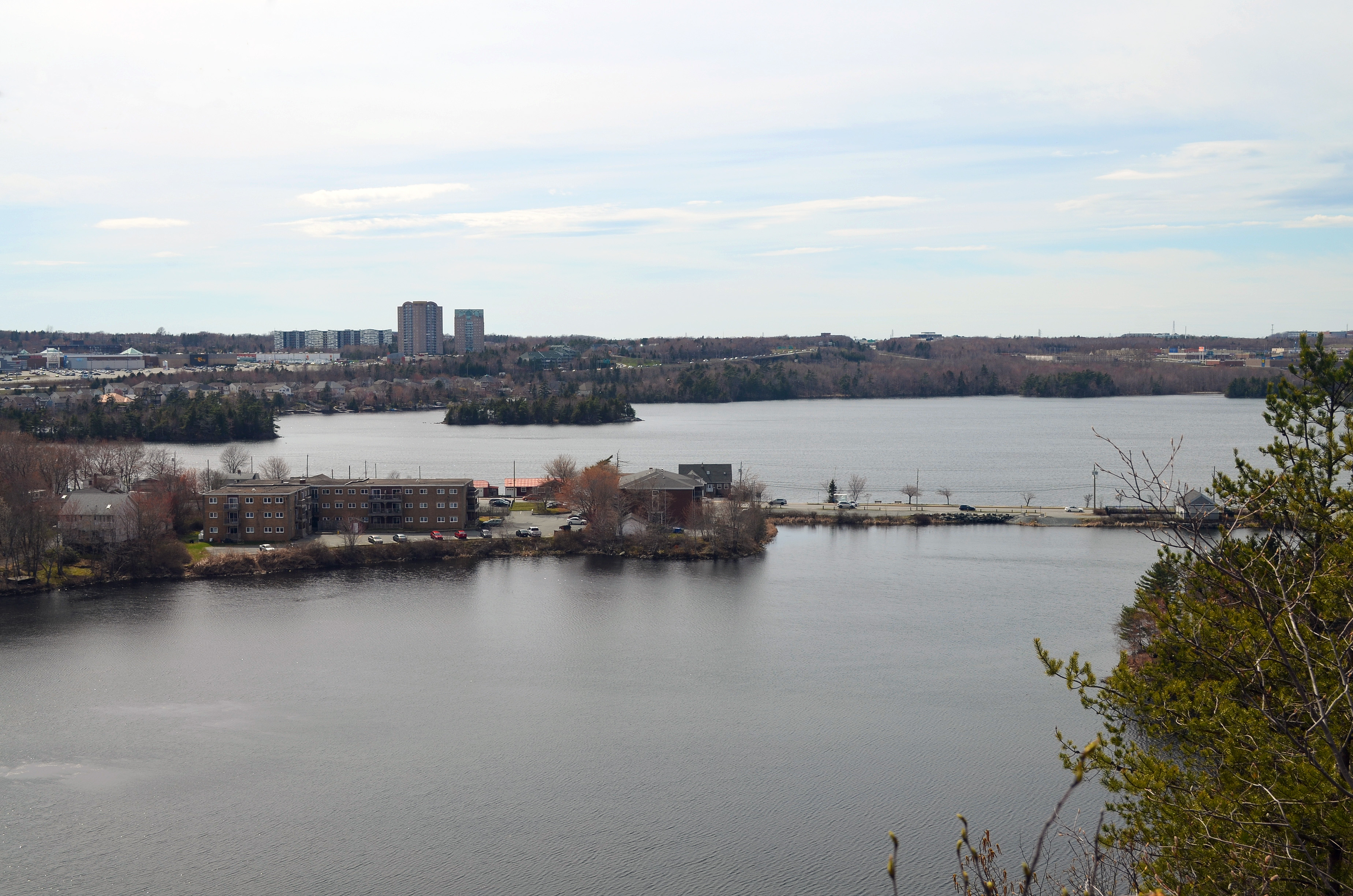
- Red Bridge Pond (foreground) and Lake Micmac (background)

- Location within Nova Scotia
- Location: Dartmouth, Nova Scotia
- Coordinates: 44°41′35.4″N 63°33′12.1″W
- Type: Lake
- Primary inflows: Shubenacadie Canal(Lake Charles), Grassy Brook
- Primary outflows: Shubenacadie Canal (Lake Banook)
- Basin countries: Canada
- Surface area: 92.3 ha (228 acres)
- Max. depth: 6 m (20 ft)
- Surface elevation: 18 m (59 ft)
- Islands: 6
- Settlements: Port Wallace, Halifax Regional Municipality, Shubie Park

Lake Micmac is a freshwater lake located in the Halifax Regional Municipality in Nova Scotia, Canada.

Located entirely within the community of Dartmouth, Lake Micmac is also known as 'Second Lake' for its position in the Shubenacadie Canal system.

The lake is bordered on three sides by roads: Waverley Road on its eastern shore, Highway 118 on its western shore, and Highway 111 on its southern shore; the bridge carrying this latter road also separates Lake Micmac from Lake Banook. The north shore of Lake Micmac is occupied by Shubie Park, a large urban park. There is also private beach frontage known informally as 'Mossman's Beach' on the northeastern end of the lake.

Lake Micmac is a popular location for water sports and boating; the lake features a boat launch at Red Bridge Pond.

Lake Micmac is named after the Mi'kmaq Nation who used the Shubenacadie portage route as a transportation corridor before the arrival of European settlers. Several pre-colonial archaeological sites have been found in the area of Shubie Park; many of the artifacts that were recovered are on display at the park's Fairbanks Centre.
