= Ashley Cheeseman Memorial Park =

Park in Halifax, Canada

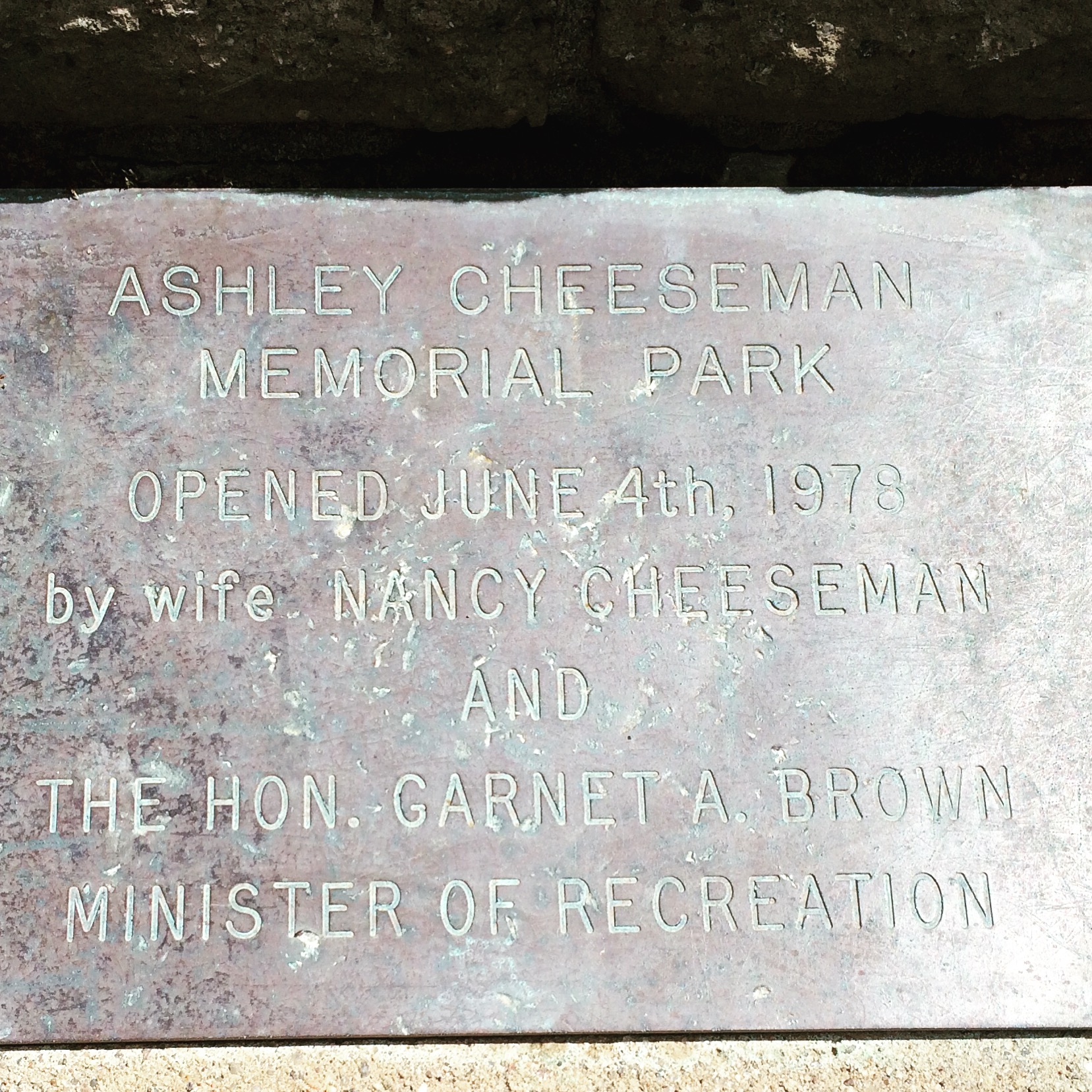
- Interactive map of Ashley Cheeseman Memorial Park
- Type: Public park and sports field
- Location: 44.6373469°N 63.6988807°W, Halifax, Nova Scotia
- Created: June 4, 1978
- Operator: Halifax Regional Municipality

Ashley Cheeseman Memorial Park is a Canadian urban park and sports field located in the Lakeside neighbourhood of Halifax, Nova Scotia. The park is located next to the Lakeside Recreation Centre. The park was opened by Nancy Cheeseman and The Hon. Garnet Brown, Minister of Recreation.

== Features ==
- Skate Park
- basketball court
- baseball diamond
- playground
- Community Garden

== History ==
The park was named in memory of the late Ashley Cheeseman who died at age 34 at the Victoria General Hospital March 25, 1976. He was born in Halifax the son of Agnes (Downey) and Douglas Cheeseman. He was employed with the Halifax Dockyards for the seven years and served with the Royal Canadian Navy for 13 years.
