= Burnside, Nova Scotia =

Community in Nova Scotia, Canada

Burnside
- Neighbourhood
- Map of Burnside Park
- Interactive map of Burnside
- Location within Nova Scotia
- Coordinates: 44°42′6″N 63°36′2″W
- Country: Canada
- Province: Nova Scotia
- Municipality: Halifax Regional Municipality
- Community: Dartmouth
- Community council: Harbour East - Marine Drive Community Council
- District: 6 - Harbourview - Burnside - Dartmouth East

Area
  - Total: 13.76 km^{2} (5.31 sq mi)
- Postal code: B3B
- Telephone Exchanges: 902 468
- GNBC code: CAFMT

Burnside is a Canadian urban neighbourhood located along the northeast shore of Bedford Basin of the Halifax Regional Municipality in Dartmouth, Nova Scotia.

== History ==
Burnside was the name originally given to the farm of Duncan Waddell, a Scotsman who had settled the area. Burn comes from the Scottish word for "stream", since one flowed through the property. Gradually, his land was sold off to various industries, including National Gypsum, a brickyard, a steel company, an oil terminal, and the Bedford Magazine.

More recently, Burnside has been the location of a major concentration of industry and commercial development since the 1970 completion of the A. Murray MacKay Bridge near the previously existing Industrial Estate, which had only 4 enterprises prior to the bridge opening. There are very few dwellings in Burnside as it is used almost exclusively for commercial operations; the only residential areas being the adjacent communities of Highfield Park, Albro Lake and Wright's Cove.

Burnside Industrial Park was formally opened by Dartmouth mayor Roland J. Thornhill in December 1969. By the mid-1970s, Burnside was home to 360 industries employing over 4,500 people.

== Burnside Park ==
Burnside Park, formerly known as Dartmouth Industrial Park, then Burnside Industrial Park and later Burnside Business Park, is a major commercial and industrial development located in the community of Burnside along the northeast shore of Bedford Basin.

It encompasses about 3,400 acres (1,376 hectares) of land running up the hill from the Basin and was developed as the former City of Dartmouth's industrial park following the completion of the A. Murray MacKay Bridge in 1970.

Current employment estimates state that 17,000 people regularly work in the park and there are more than 1,000 employers.

A wide variety of businesses are located in Burnside, mostly specializing in sales, manufacturing, electronics, transportation, and services. The park is composed mostly of low-rise office buildings, warehouses and retail stores.

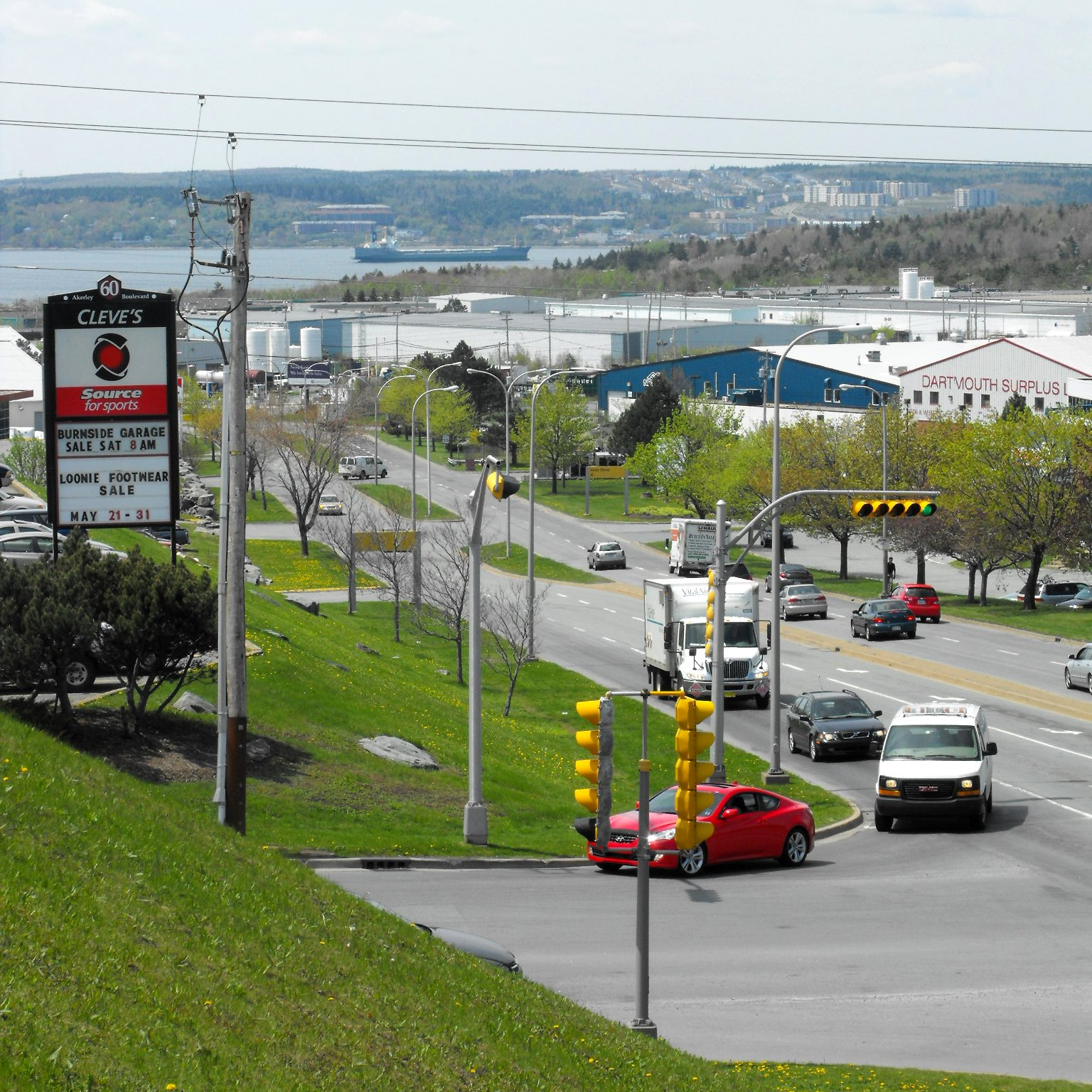
Akerley Boulevard

Its location has played a large role in its success. The construction of the A. Murray MacKay Bridge resulted in a boom of development in the area, since it provided a quick link to Halifax Peninsula, the Fairview Cove container terminal, the Halterm/south end container terminal, as well as many residential areas in the north end and Clayton Park, where many of the park's employees live.

Furniture manufacturer, Swedwood Canada began operations in Burnside Park in 1987. From 1991–2004 the company was operated by IKEA. In 2004 Scanwood Canada purchased the company from IKEA Group with the assistance of Nova Scotia Business Inc. Now Nova Scotia owned, the company has diversified while continuing to maintain its IKEA contracts.

Due to the size and nature of the park, there are several hotels oriented towards business travellers located within its boundaries, including a Ramada, a Day's Inn, and a Comfort Inn.

The park includes the smaller City of Lakes business incubator park.

Burnside Park underwent an expansion in its eastern end during 2006 with the adjacent development of the Dartmouth Crossing retail and office development.

== Transportation ==
Burnside is served by the Canadian National Railway (CN). The CN Dartmouth Subdivision passes through the area, from which three branch lines extend to different parts of the industrial park.

The area is adjacent to several major provincial highways, including Highway 107, Highway 111, and Highway 118.

Public transit service is provided by Halifax Transit, operated by the municipal government. The city plans to construct a bus station, called Wrights Cove Terminal, just off Windmill Road in the future.
