= Nova Scotia Route 318 =

Highway in Nova Scotia, Canada

Coordinates: 44°41′35.9″N 63°32′47.5″W

Route 318
- Waverley Road, Braemar Drive

Route information
- Maintained by Nova Scotia Department of Transportation and Infrastructure Renewal
- Length: 11 km (6.8 mi)
- Existed: 1971–present

Major junctions
- South end: Hwy 111 / Trunk 7 in Dartmouth
- Hwy 107 in Portobello
- North end: Trunk 2 in Waverley

Location
- Country: Canada
- Province: Nova Scotia
- Counties: Halifax Regional Municipality

Highway system
- Provincial highways in Nova Scotia; 100-series
| ← Route 316 | → Route 320 |

Route 318 is a collector road in the Canadian province of Nova Scotia.

It is located in the Halifax Regional Municipality and connects Dartmouth at Exit 6 of Highway 111 with Waverley at Trunk 2.

It is also called "Waverley Road" and "Braemar Drive." The road follows the north shore of Lake Micmac, Lake Charles, Nova Scotia, and Lake William, which comprise part of the historic Shubenacadie Canal route.

== History ==
Highway 318 was formerly designated as Trunk Highway 18.

== Communities ==
- Dartmouth
- Port Wallace
- Portobello
- Waverley

== See also ==
- List of Nova Scotia provincial highways
