= Peggys Cove Preservation Area, Nova Scotia =

Coordinates: 44°29′55.8″N 63°55′4.6″W

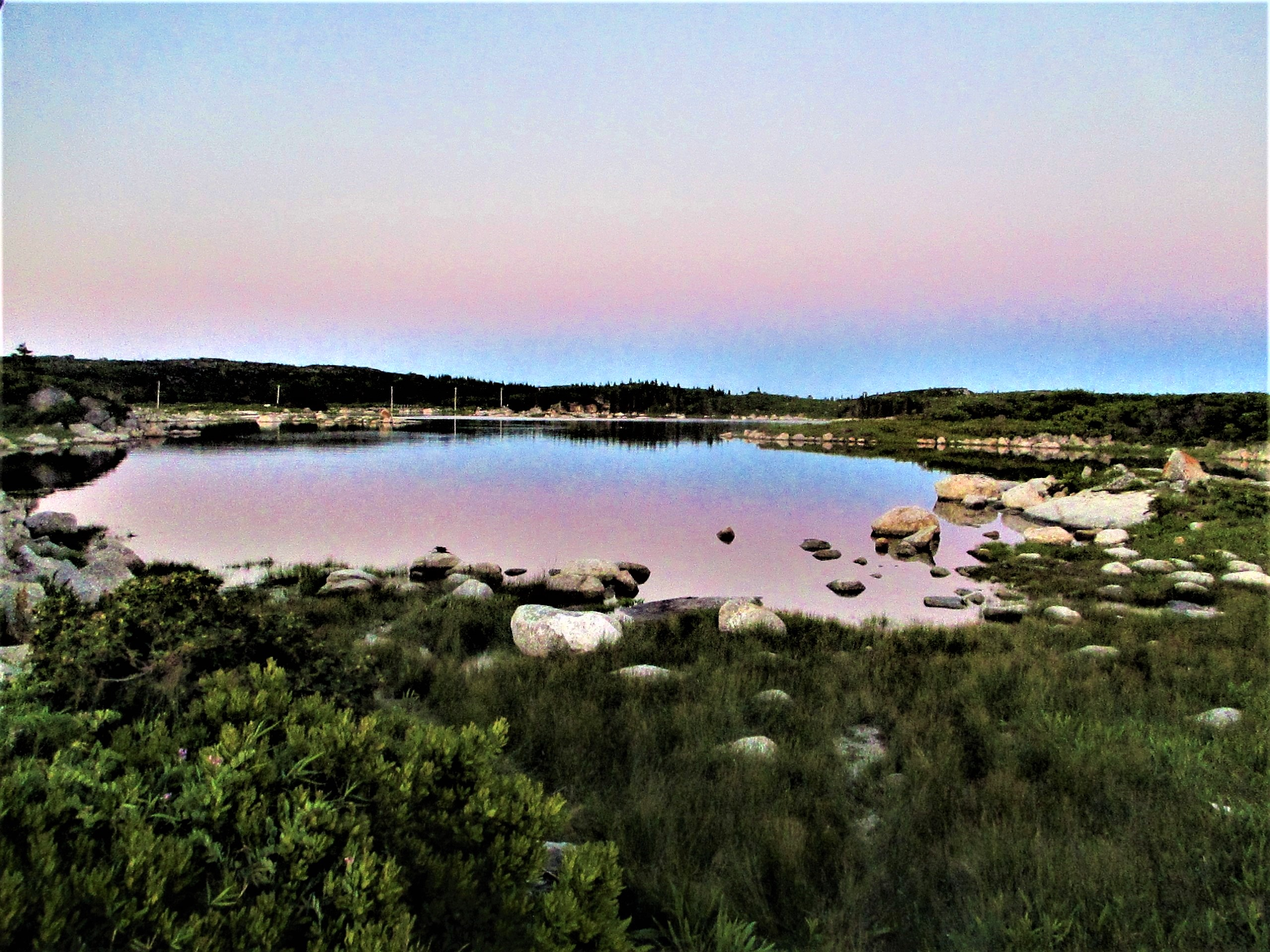
Peggy's Cove Preservation Area

Peggy's Cove Preservation Area in Nova Scotia

Peggy's Cove Preservation Area is a preservation area and community enacted by the Nova Scotia government to preserve the unique scenic beauty, character and atmosphere of Peggy's Cove for the enjoyment of both residents and visitors within Peggy's Cove Nova Scotia mandated by the Peggy's Cove Commission Act. The area includes the Swissair Flight 111 memorial site at Whalesback.
