= Nova Scotia Highway 113 =

Highway in Nova Scotia, Canada

Highway 113
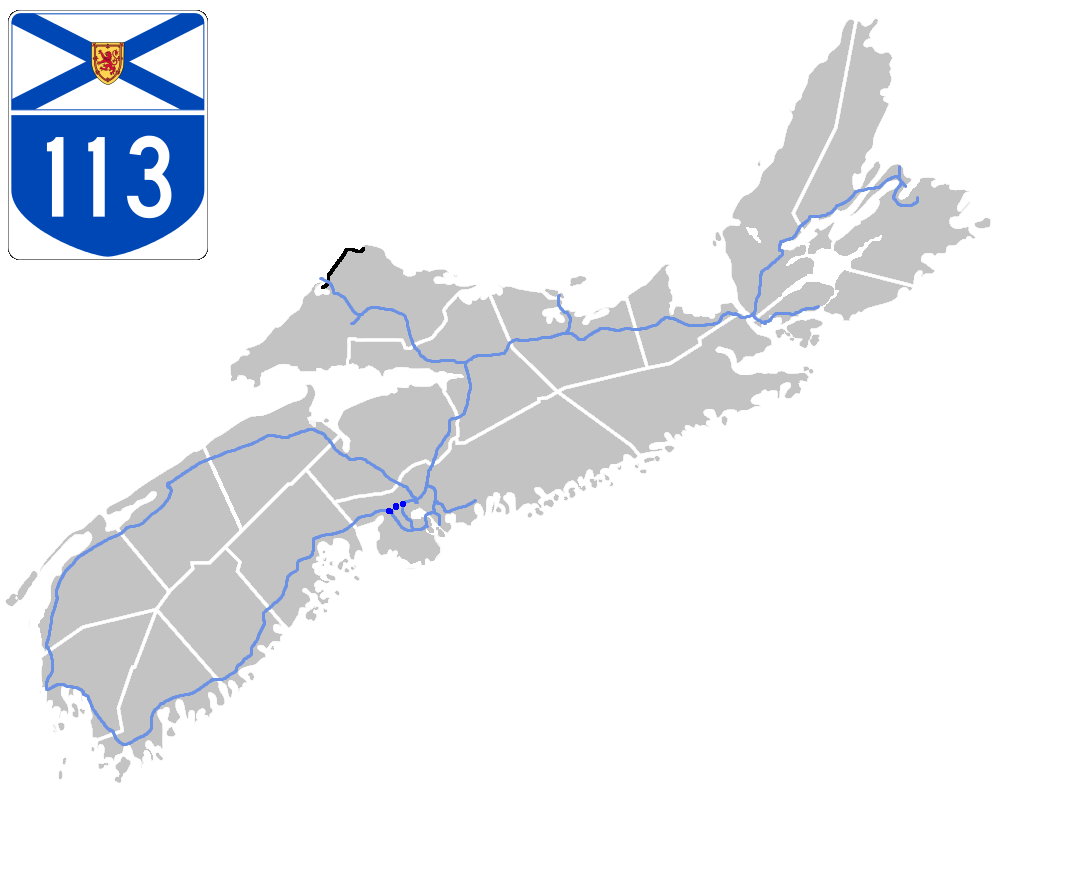
- Location: Halifax Regional Municipality, Nova Scotia
- Proposer: Department of Transportation and Infrastructure Renewal
- Status: proposed
- Type: 4-lane expressway
- Stakeholders: Government of Nova Scotia, residents of Halifax Regional Municipality
- Supporters: Businesses and residents from the South Shore region of Nova Scotia.
- Opponents: Environmentalists, residents of Halifax Regional Municipality
- Geometry: 9.9 km (6.2 mi) in length

Highway 113 is a proposed freeway in the Canadian province of Nova Scotia. It would provide another connection between Highway 102 and Highway 103, passing through the Blue Mountain-Birch Cove Lakes wilderness area.

== History ==
The Nova Scotia Department of Transportation began highway corridor preservation work in 1998.

A focus report on the highway's construction was submitted by the Department of Transportation and Infrastructure Renewal on March 31, 2006. Engineering plans and an environmental impact assessment have been completed. Although no funding has been approved for construction to begin, the provincial government has opted to begin purchasing land required in order to preserve the right of way for the proposed highway.

The proposed highway would be 9.9 km (6.2 mi) in length and run from Highway 103 near exit 4 in Hubley in the west to Highway 102 near exit 3 in Bedford in the east. Such an alignment would allow traffic currently using the uncontrolled access Highway 213, known as the Hammonds Plains Road, to bypass the communities of Stillwater Lake, Hammonds Plains and Bedford.

The highway is considered a long-term proposal, and there are no plans to construct it in the near future. As of 2024, no plans of Highway 113 have really been known. It is unlikely that Highway 113 will be built in the near future.
