= Sullivan's Pond =

Recreation area in Dartmouth, Nova Scotia

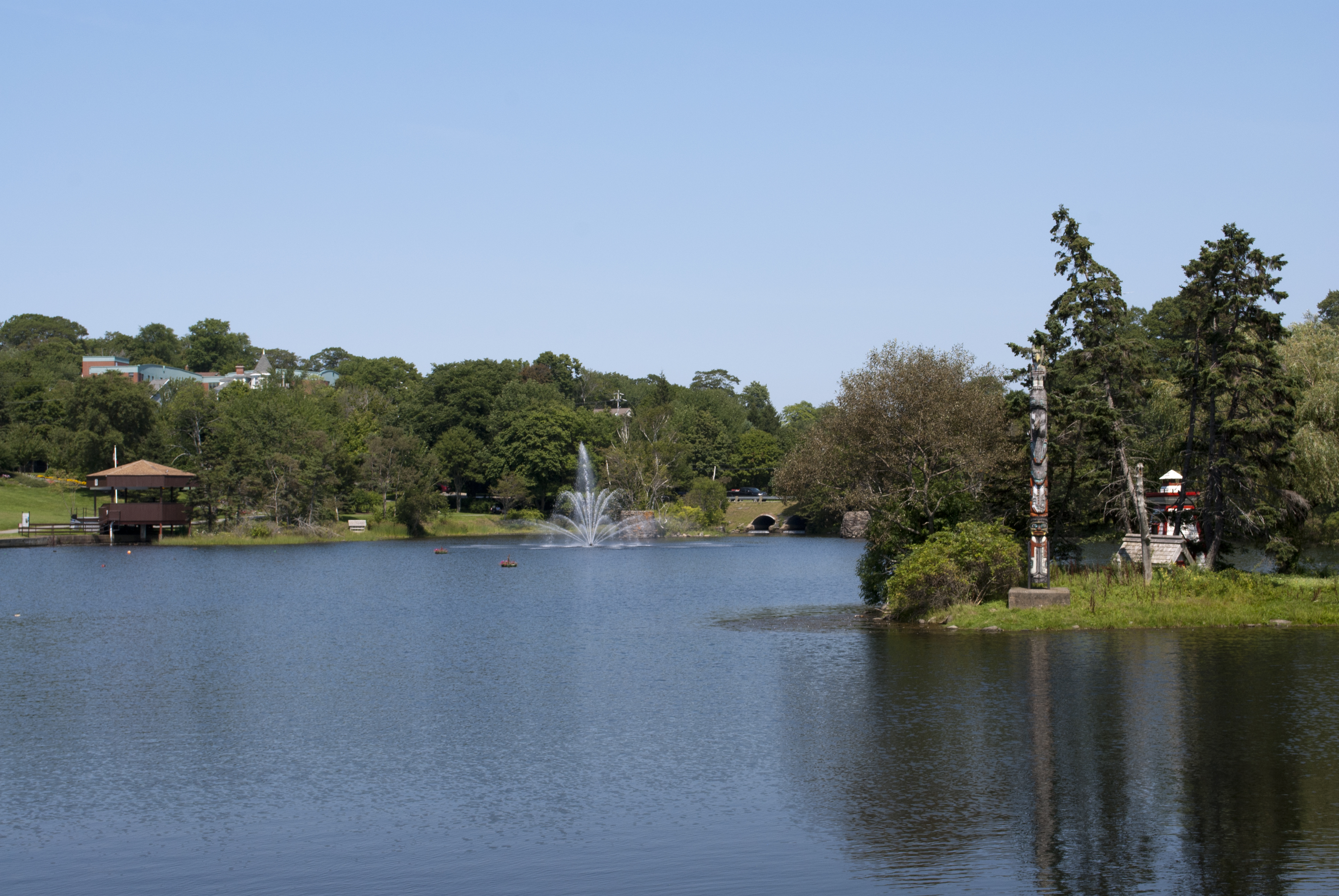

- Location within Nova Scotia
- Location: Dartmouth, Nova Scotia
- Coordinates: 44°40′23″N 63°33′47″W
- Type: artificial lake
- Primary inflows: Shubenacadie Canal
- Primary outflows: Shubenacadie Canal
- Basin countries: Canada
- Surface area: 2 ha (4.9 acres)
- Surface elevation: 16 m (52 ft)
- Islands: 1

Sullivan's Pond is an artificial lake and recreation area located in Dartmouth in Halifax Regional Municipality. It formed part of the Shubenacadie Canal.

== Shubenacadie Canal ==
The pond is located one-half kilometre (1,600 ft) northeast of Halifax Harbour at Dartmouth Cove as part of the Shubenacadie Canal system. It is the first water body in the canal system when heading from the harbour to the Bay of Fundy and was constructed as a holding pond for southbound vessels wishing to transit the remaining distance to the harbour. With an elevation several dozen metres (about 50 ft) higher than the harbour to the south, the pond was linked to the ocean by small inclined marine railway which was used to haul boats to and from Dartmouth Cove. A lock lifted boats from the pond into Lake Banook to the north.

After the Shubenacadie Canal was abandoned due to unsustainable competition from the Nova Scotia Railway in the 1860s, Sullivan's Pond fell into disrepair and homes began to surround the pond. The area around Dartmouth Cove south of the pond became industrialized with construction of the Starr Manufacturing ice skate factory and the establishment of a shipyard. Although the pond was uphill and mostly insulated from being polluted by these developments, a general air of neglect surrounded the water body for many decades.

== Redevelopment ==
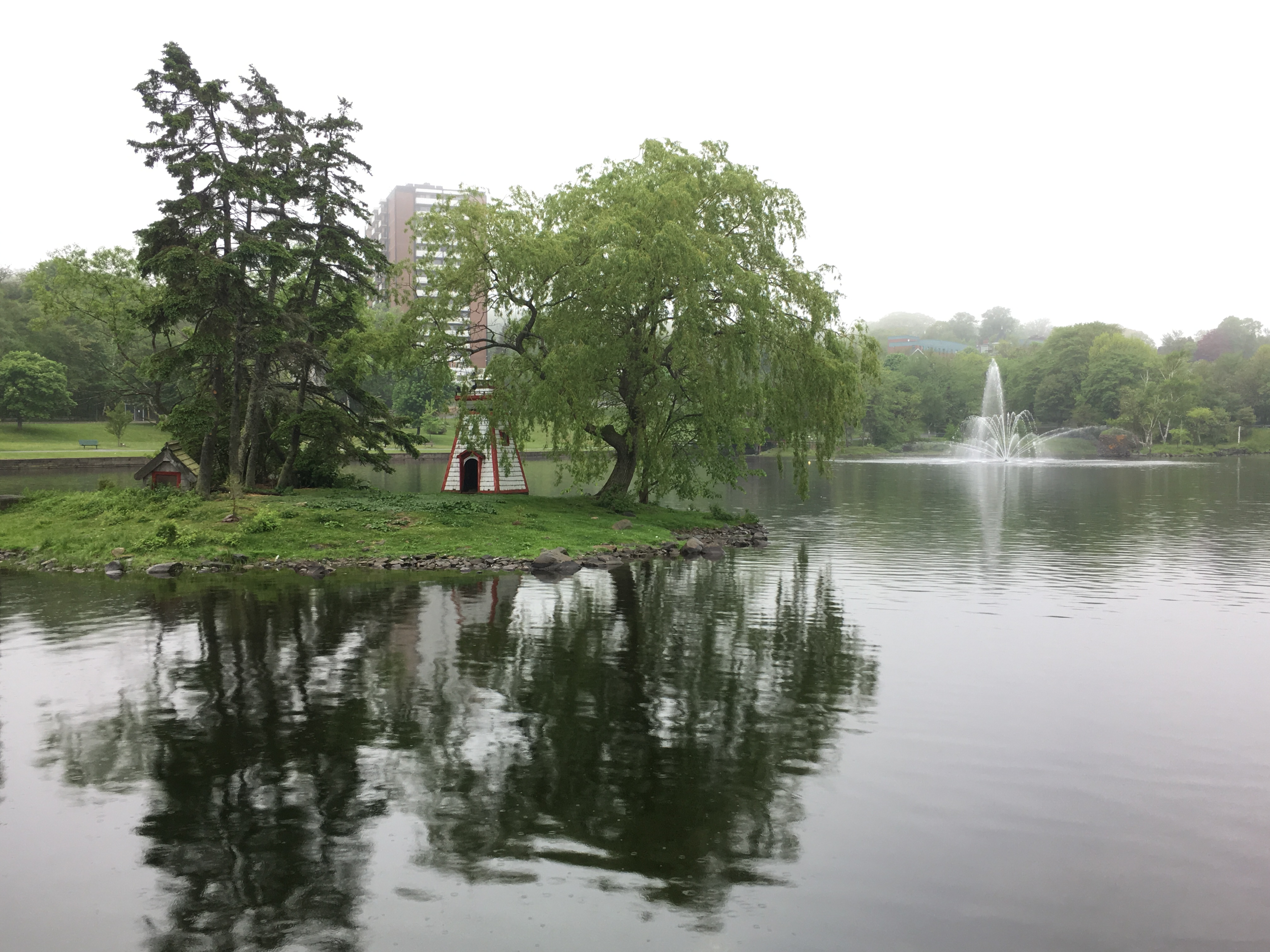
Sullivan's Pond and fountain

During the 20th century, the City of Dartmouth, also known by its nickname "The City of Lakes", undertook to restore or clean up the various lakes used in the Shubenacadie Canal system. Today, Sullivan's Pond is part of a park which runs along the southern shores of Lake Banook, providing habitat for water fowl.

Since the 1950s, Dartmouth saw numerous residential developments, including several subdivisions in the area surrounding Lake Banook and Sullivan's Pond. To reestablish public access to the water, the city developed a plan to gradually recover lands adjacent to the lake by purchasing properties as they became available, which resulted in the current park area.

Today, the pond features a small island with a totem pole which was a gift to the city from the province of British Columbia for hosting the 1969 Canada Summer Games. The Island was built by one of the first bulldozers in Nova Scotia by Denie Melanson. There is also an open-air concert pavilion located near the pond constructed for the city by the Rotary Club of Dartmouth, and the cenotaph is located near the pond. In December 2006, a new fountain became operational. In 2018, city staff planted a cold-hardy palm tree in the park.

== See also ==
- List of lakes in Nova Scotia
