= Nova Scotia Highway 111 =

Highway in Nova Scotia

Highway 111
- Highway of Heroes; Circumferential Highway
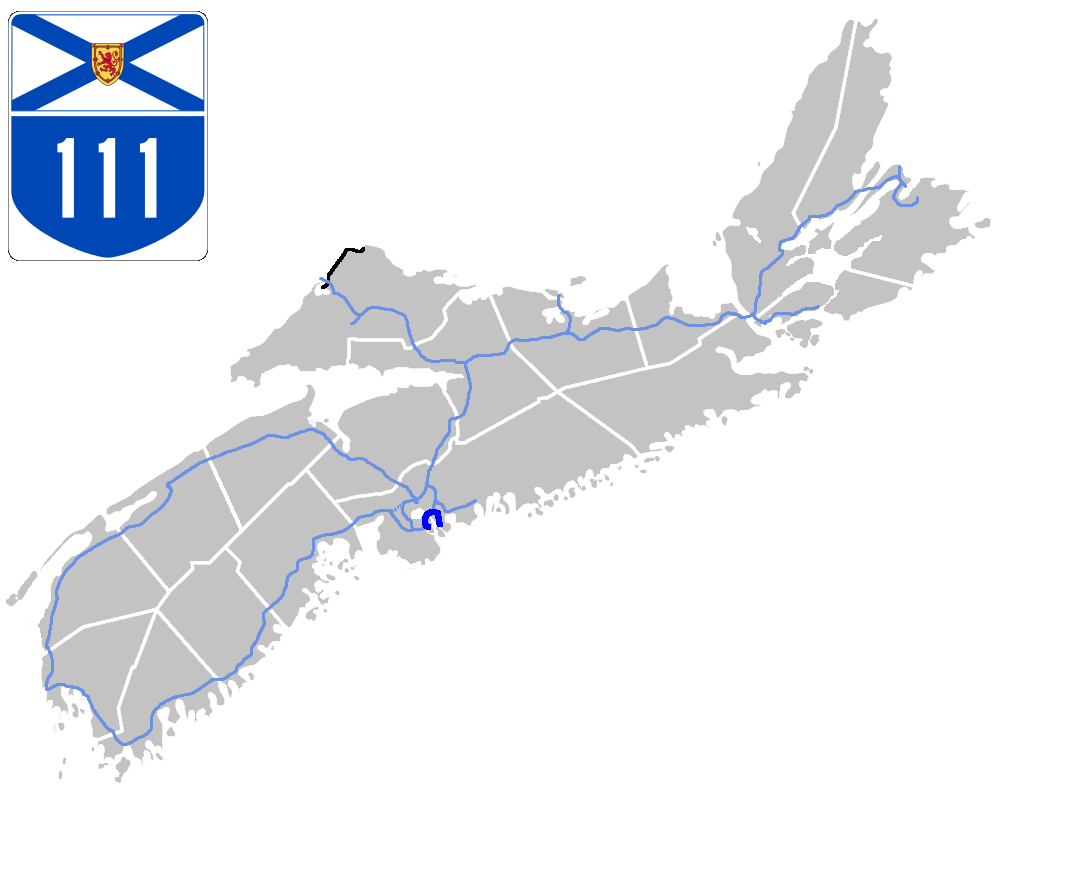

Route information
- Maintained by Nova Scotia Department of Public Works
- Length: 13 km (8.1 mi)

Major junctions
- West end: Trunk 2 in Halifax
- Hwy 118 in Dartmouth; Trunk 7 / Route 318 in Dartmouth
- East end: Route 322 in Dartmouth

Location
- Country: Canada
- Province: Nova Scotia

Highway system
- Provincial highways in Nova Scotia; 100-series
← Hwy 107	→ Hwy 113

Highway 111 is a 13-kilometre (8 mi) controlled-access highway in Halifax Regional Municipality, Nova Scotia, Canada. Varying in width from four to twelve lanes, Highway 111 is also known as the Circumferential Highway because it forms a partial orbital road around Dartmouth. The highway runs from Pleasant Street in the neighbourhood of Woodside in the south to the A. Murray MacKay Bridge in the north.

== History ==
=== Construction and development ===
Construction of the Circumferential Highway began in 1960. It originally ran from Pleasant Street in Woodside (its present-day terminus) to Woodland Avenue. The section from Woodland Avenue to the MacKay Bridge was constructed at the same time as the bridge, opening in 1970.

Exit 4 was completed in 1971 with the opening of Highway 118.

The grade-separated interchange with Portland Street (Exit 7) was completed during the 1977/78 fiscal year. The interchange with Burnside Drive (Exit 3) was completed during the 1980/81 fiscal year. The Mount Hope Avenue interchange (Exit 8) was completed in 2006 at a cost of around $11.5 million.

=== Micmac Rotary ===
The Micmac (or Mic Mac) Rotary was a traffic circle located at the intersection of Hwy 111 with Route 318 (Braemar Drive) and Trunk 7 (Main Street/Prince Albert Road/Grahams Grove). It was named after nearby Lake Micmac, which was partially in-filled to accommodate it. The Micmac Rotary was notorious for rush hour congestion, even resulting in the recording of a song entitled "Mic Mac Rotary Blues".

The rotary was removed during a redesign of the intersection in the late 1980s which saw it replaced by the "Micmac Parclo", which consists of a series of overpasses and controlled access lanes. The resulting roadway through the Parclo and across Lake Micmac to the interchange with Highway 118 is the widest in Atlantic Canada at 10-12 lanes.

=== Highway of Heroes ===
On May 22, 2013, Highway 111 was officially named "Highway of Heroes" by Premier Darrell Dexter.

== Exit list ==
The entire route is located in Halifax Regional Municipality.

Location	km	mi	Exit	Destinations	Notes
Continues as Windsor Street (Trunk 2 south) to Hwy 102
Halifax Peninsula	0.0	0.0		Trunk 2 north (Bedford Highway) / Lady Hammond Road – Bedford	At-grade
Halifax Peninsula	0.5	0.31	—	Robie Street	Access via Massachusetts Avenue
Halifax Peninsula	0.8	0.50	—	Barrington Street	
Halifax Harbour	1.4– 2.6	0.87– 1.6	A. Murray MacKay Bridge		
Dartmouth	3.3	2.1	(1)	Princess Margaret Boulevard	
Dartmouth	3.9	2.4	2	Victoria Road (Route 322) to Trunk 7 west / Hwy 101 – Downtown, Bedford, Lower Sackville	Signed as exits 2E (Route 322) and 2W (To Trunk 7 / Hwy 101)
Dartmouth	5.1	3.2	3	Highfield Park Drive – Burnside Industrial Park	
Dartmouth	6.6	4.1	4	Hwy 118 to Hwy 107 / Hwy 102 / Woodland Avenue – Airport, Truro	Signed as exits 4S (south) and 4N (north) northbound; no northbound entrance from Hwy 118 north (Woodland Avenue)
Dartmouth	7.5	4.7	5	Micmac Boulevard	
Dartmouth	8.3	5.2	6	Prince Albert Road / Main Street (Trunk 7) to Hwy 107 / Braemar Drive (Route 318 north) – Waverley, Eastern Shore	Signed as exits 6A (west) and 6B (east) southbound
Dartmouth	9.0	5.6	—	Gordon Avenue	Northbound exit only; no signage
Dartmouth	9.9	6.2	7	Portland Street (Route 207) / Woodlawn Road – Downtown Dartmouth, Cole Harbour	Signed as exits 7W (west) and 7E (east) southbound
Dartmouth	11.6	7.2	8	Mount Hope Avenue – Woodside Industrial Park	
Dartmouth	12.9	8.0		Pleasant Street (Route 322)	At-grade
1.000 mi = 1.609 km; 1.000 km = 0.621 mi: Incomplete access; Tolled

== See also ==
- List of highways named Circumferential Highway
- List of highways named Highway of Heroes
