= Shubie Park =

Park in Nova Scotia, Canada

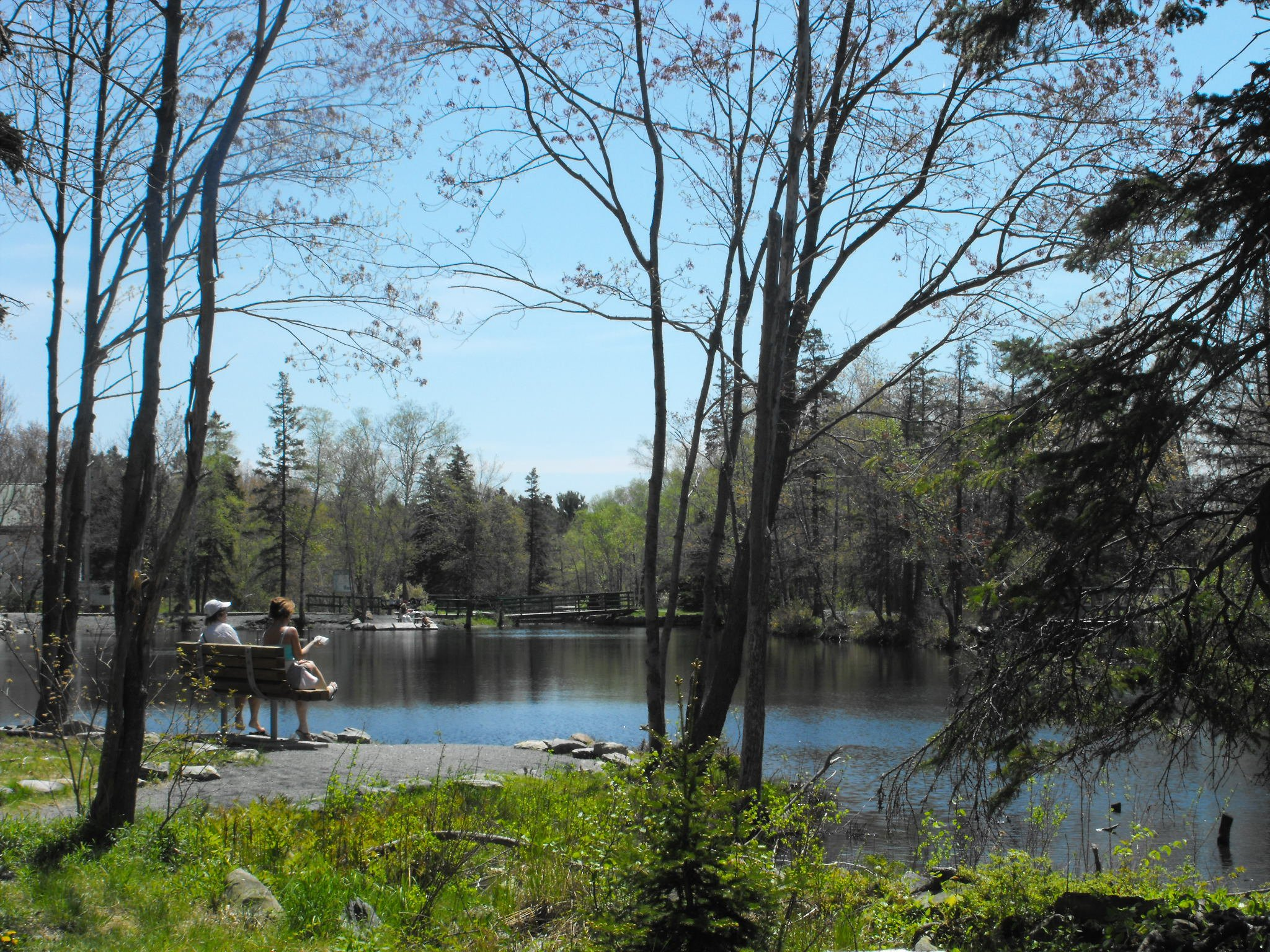
- Shubie Park
- Interactive map of Shubie Park
- Type: Public park
- Location: Halifax, Nova Scotia
- Coordinates: 44°42′5.3″N 63°33′26.7″W
- Area: 16 hectares (40 acres)
- Operator: City of Halifax

Shubie Park is a 16-hectare (40-acre) urban park in Dartmouth, Nova Scotia maintained by the Halifax Regional Municipality.

Heavily forested, Shubie Park is roughly linear in shape as it is bounded on the north and west by Highway 118 expressway and on the south and east by Lake Micmac and the southern edge of Lake Charles. A portion of the abandoned Shubenacadie Canal passes through the park, from which the park takes its name. The main soil is a well to excessively drained stony sandy loam podzol of the Halifax Series.

The land comprising Shubie Park was part of a larger estate called "Countryview" that had been established in 1722 as the King's wood lot, providing masts for the Royal Navy. In 1783, the Countryview estate became the first royal land grant in Dartmouth, issued by King George III to naval mast maker Samuel Greenwood.

Since then, the land has exchanged hands several times, and in recent decades became home to industry including a rock quarry, asphalt plant and construction and demolition dump. At the time that Highway 118 was extended through the area on the northwest side of Lake Micmac during the 1960s-1970s, the remaining undeveloped land of the Countryview Estate bordering the greenbelt between the highway and lake was set aside as a municipal park for the City of Dartmouth.

The municipality developed the park primarily as a green space, although an area bordering Lake Charles was established with a beach, day use picnic area and campground - all operated since a 1996 municipal amalgamation by the Halifax Regional Municipality.

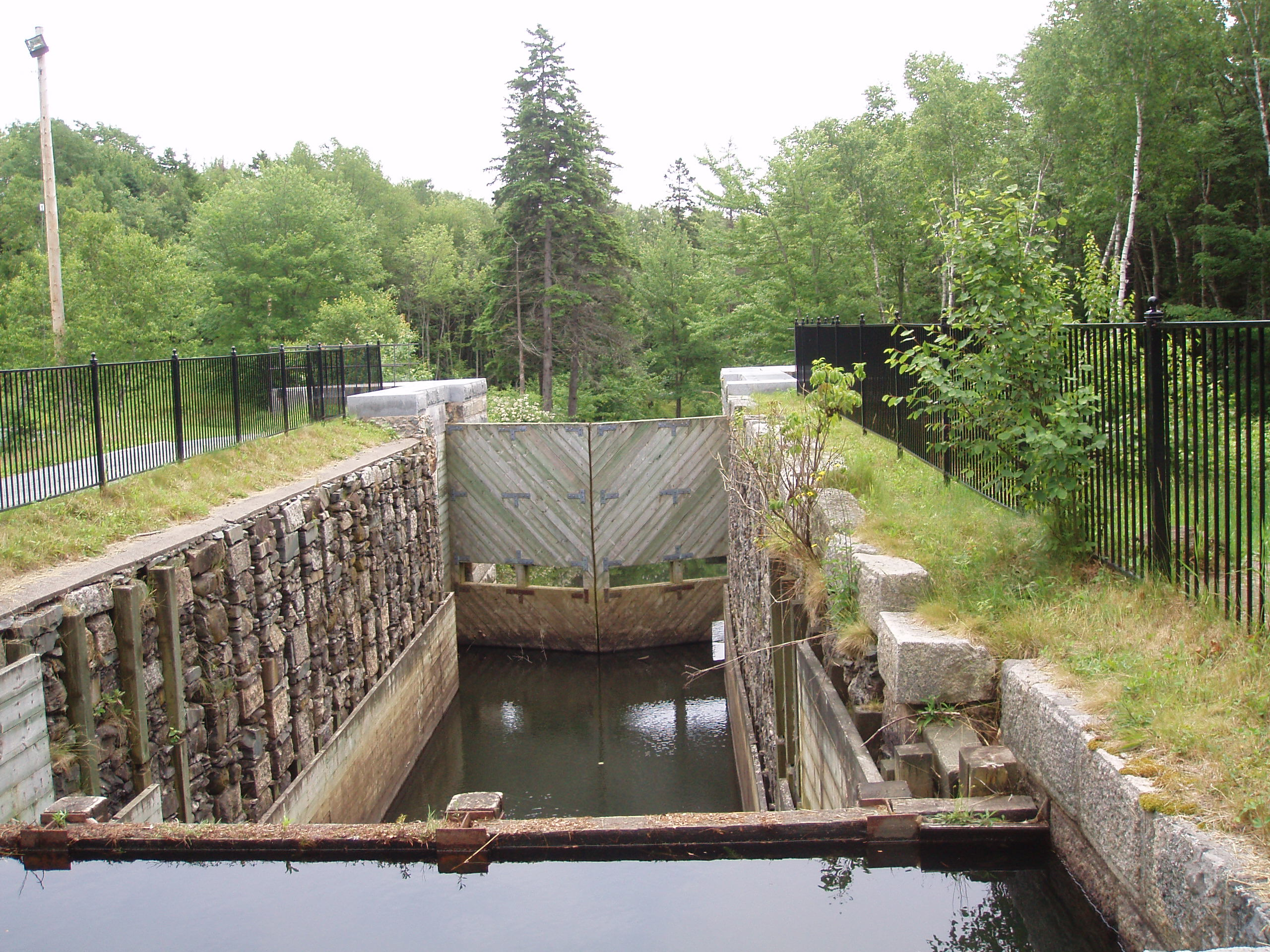
Shubie Park Canal

Shubie Park contains trails and an interpretive area called the Fairbanks Centre next to the canal at the location of a series of locks between Lake Micmac and Lake Charles. The Fairbanks Centre features a scale model of canal lock mechanisms and various displays. The wooded trails of the Shubie Canal Park follow a remaining section of the canal and include part of the Trans-Canada Trail.

The park currently serves as one of the filming locations of the CTV television series Sullivan's Crossing.

== Camping services ==
Next to Shubie Park is the municipality-owned, privately managed Shubie Campground. It currently has 101 sites, consisting of 29 unserviced and 72 serviced sites.
