= Nova Scotia Highway 107 =

Highway in Nova Scotia

Highway 107

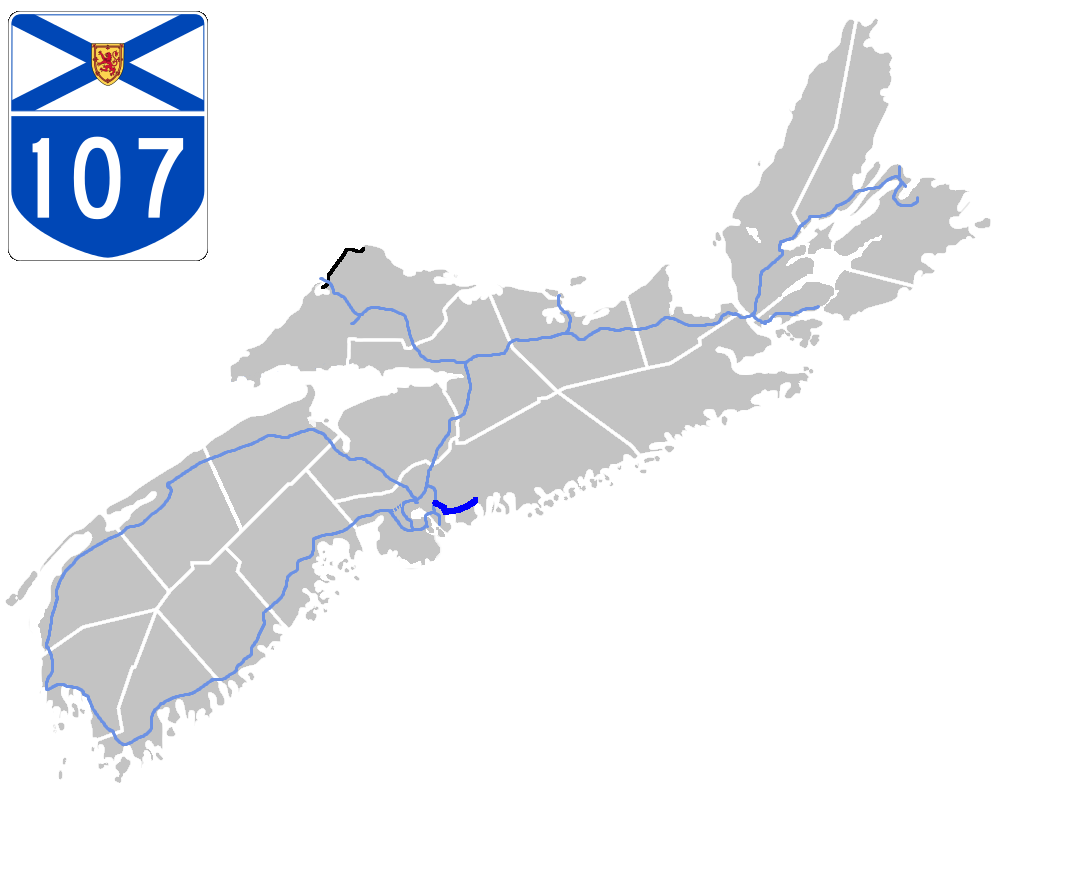

Route information
- Maintained by Nova Scotia Department of Public Works
- Length: 52.1 km (32.4 mi)
- Existed: 1975–present

Major junctions
- West end: Hwy 102 in Bedford
- Akerley Boulevard in Dartmouth; Hwy 118 in Dartmouth; Trunk 7 in Dartmouth; Trunk 7 near Cherry Brook
- East end: Trunk 7 in Musquodoboit Harbour

Location
- Country: Canada
- Province: Nova Scotia

Highway system
- Provincial highways in Nova Scotia; 100-series
← Hwy 106 (TCH)	→ Hwy 111

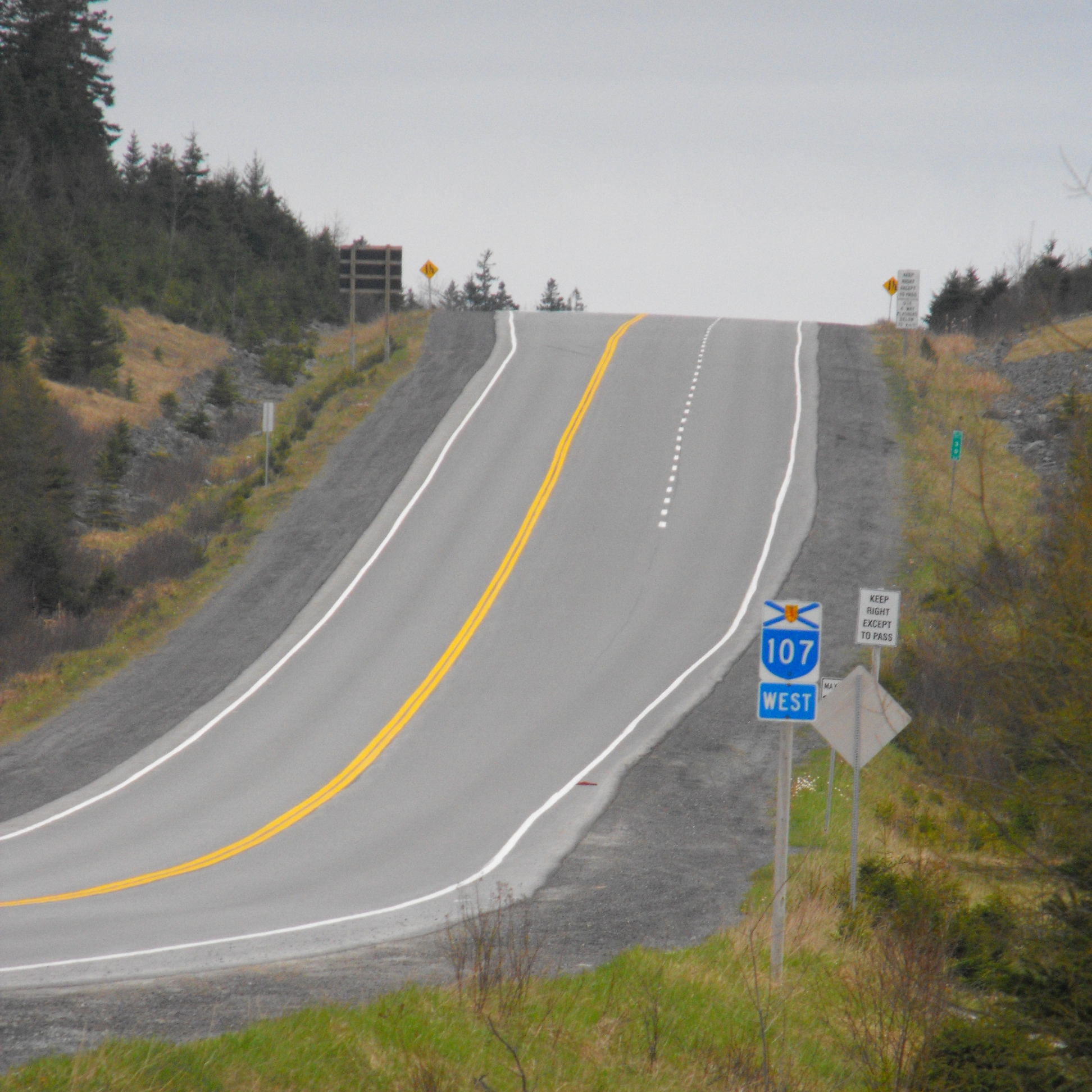
Nova Scotia Highway 107 near its eastern terminus with Trunk 7.

Highway 107 in Nova Scotia runs through the eastern suburbs of the Halifax Regional Municipality, from Bedford, Nova Scotia to an intersection with Trunk 7 in Musquodoboit Harbour. It is 52.1 km (32.4 mi) long.

== Route description ==
The highway begins in Bedford at Highway 102, travels southeast to the Burnside Industrial Park in Dartmouth, then continues east to an interchange with Highway 118. From there, it continues southeast to an intersection of Main Street in Dartmouth and Trunk 7 in Westphal. The highway then travels east, concurrent with Trunk 7, through the Sunset Acres neighbourhood in Westphal and the community of Cherry Brook for about 5 km (3.1 mi). Near Preston, Highway 107 and Trunk 7 split, and Highway 107 continues eastward as a controlled access two-lane highway for the remainder of its route. The highway travels past the communities of Preston, Lake Echo, Porters Lake and Head of Chezzetcook before reaching its eastern terminus with Trunk 7 west of Musquodoboit Harbour.

== History ==
=== Dartmouth to Musquodoboit Harbour section ===
Construction of the highway began in 1972/73. The first segment, running from Trunk 7 to Mineville Road, opened to traffic during the 1975/76 fiscal year. At that time a further extension of the road, across Lake Echo, was under construction.

Grading work for the final segment from Head of Chezzetcook (exit 20) to Musquodoboit Harbour began in 1986/87.The highway was completed to Musquodoboit Harbour in 1991.

=== Dartmouth Bypass / Forest Hills Extension ===
The section of Highway 107 between Trunk 7 (at Forest Hills) and Highway 118 has also been known as the Dartmouth Bypass, or Forest Hills Extension. The first section of the bypass (from Trunk 7 to the interchange at Montague Road) opened to traffic in 1985/86. The remaining section, connecting to Highway 118, opened in 1986/87.

A short extension to Akerley Boulevard in the Burnside Industrial Park was constructed in the early 1990s.

Twinning of the section between Burnside (which is already twinned) and a point southeast of Exit 14 (Montague Road) began in 2024 and is expected to be completed in 2028/29.

=== Burnside/Sackville extension ===
The section from Akerley Boulevard, along the southwestern side of Anderson Lake, to Exit 4C on Highway 102 opened to traffic on December 20, 2024. This extension, known locally as the Burnside Expressway, allows commuters from Halifax and Burnside heading to Sackville to bypass the Bedford Bypass and Windmill Road and instead go through Burnside and connect directly into Sackville. The western terminus includes connections to Highway 102, Duke Street and Glendale Avenue. New exits were also constructed at Akerley Boulevard, Burnside Drive, and at a future connection near Anderson Lake.

== Exit list ==
The entire route is located in Halifax Regional Municipality.

Location	km	mi	Exit	Destinations	Notes
Lower Sackville; Bedford	0.0	0.0	–	Hwy 102 to Hwy 101 / Trunk 2 – Halifax, Windsor, Airport, Truro Glendale Avenue / Duke Street	Hwy 102 exit 4C; western terminus
Bedford	3.0	1.9	11	Closed - Future Anderson Lake Connector	Ramps, overpass, and roundabouts constructed, but not connected to any roads.
Burnside	6.9	4.3	12	Burnside Drive	Eastbound exit and westbound entrance
Burnside	8.0	5.0	12	Akerley Boulevard	Westbound exit and eastbound entrance
Dartmouth	9.9	6.2	13	Hwy 118 – Truro, Airport, Dartmouth, Halifax	Signed as exit 13S (south) and 13N (north); Hwy 118 exit 13
Dartmouth	12.5	7.8	14	To Route 318 / Waverley Road, Braemar Drive	
Dartmouth	17.7	11.0	15	Main Street (Trunk 7 west) – Dartmouth To Route 318 / Forest Hills Parkway – Westphal	At grade; western end of Trunk 7 concurrency
Cherry Brook	21.5	13.4	16	Ross Road (Route 328 south)	At-grade
	22.0	13.7	17	Trunk 7 east – Preston	At grade; eastern end of Trunk 7 concurrency
Mineville	26.6	16.5	18	To Trunk 7 (Mineville Road) – Mineville, Lake Echo	
Porters Lake	34.2	21.3	19	To Trunk 7 / Route 207 (West Porters Lake Road) – West Porters Lake, Lawrencetown	Eastbound exit, westbound entrance
Porters Lake	36.0	22.4	20	To Trunk 7 / Route 207 (William Porter Connector) – West Chezzetcook, Porters Lake, Lake Echo	
	43.0	26.7	21	To Trunk 7 (East Chezzetcook Road) – Gaetz Brook, East Chezzetcook	Eastbound exit, westbound entrance
Musquodoboit Harbour	52.2	32.4		Trunk 7 – Musquodoboit Harbour, Sheet Harbour	At-grade; Hwy 107 eastern terminus
1.000 mi = 1.609 km; 1.000 km = 0.621 mi: Concurrency terminus; Incomplete access; Unopened
