= Lawrencetown, Nova Scotia =

Lawrencetown, Nova Scotia may refer to:

- Lawrencetown, Annapolis County, Nova Scotia
- Lawrencetown, Halifax County, Nova Scotia
- East Lawrencetown, Nova Scotia, also in Halifax County
- Upper Lawrencetown, Nova Scotia, also in Halifax County
- West Lawrencetown, Nova Scotia, also in Halifax County
