= Lawrencetown =

Lawrencetown may refer to:

- Lawrencetown, County Down, Northern Ireland
- Lawrencetown, County Galway, Ireland
- Lawrencetown, Annapolis County, Nova Scotia, Canada
- Lawrencetown, Halifax County, Nova Scotia, Canada
  - East Lawrencetown, Nova Scotia
  - West Lawrencetown, Nova Scotia
  - Upper Lawrencetown, Nova Scotia
  - Lawrencetown Beach Provincial Park
