= Nova Scotia Route 207 =

Highway in Nova Scotia, Canada

Coordinates: 44°40′17.1″N 63°29′36.3″W

Route 207
- Marine Drive

Route information
- Maintained by Nova Scotia Department of Transportation and Infrastructure Renewal
- Length: 39 km (24 mi)

Major junctions
- West end: Route 322 in Dartmouth
- Hwy 111 in Dartmouth; Route 328 in Upper Lawrencetown
- East end: Trunk 7 in Porters Lake

Location
- Country: Canada
- Province: Nova Scotia

Highway system
- Provincial highways in Nova Scotia; 100-series
← Route 206	→ Route 208

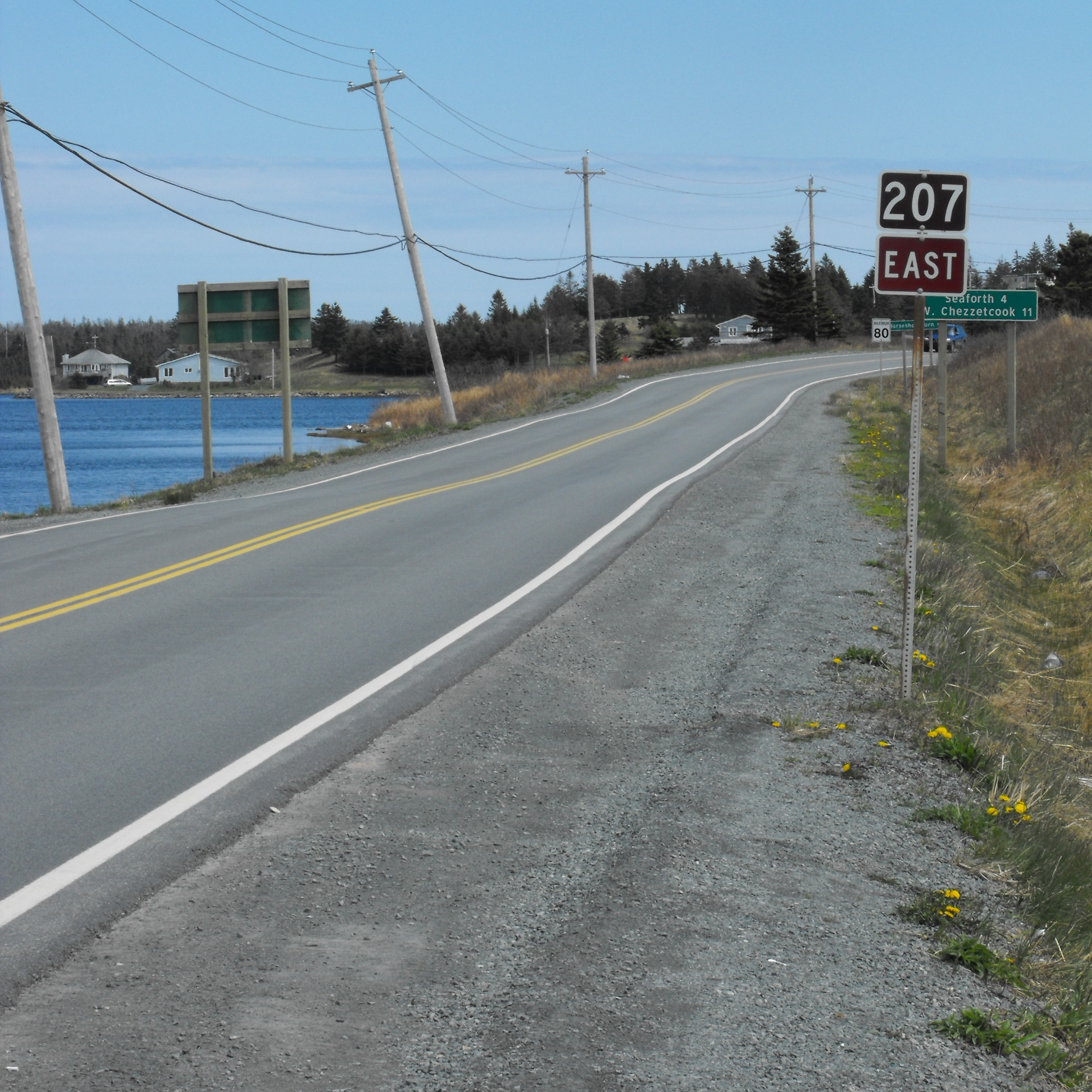
Nova Scotia Route 207

Route 207 is a collector road in the Canadian province of Nova Scotia. It is located in the Halifax Regional Municipality and connects Dartmouth to Porters Lake on the Eastern Shore.

== Route description ==
=== Dartmouth ===
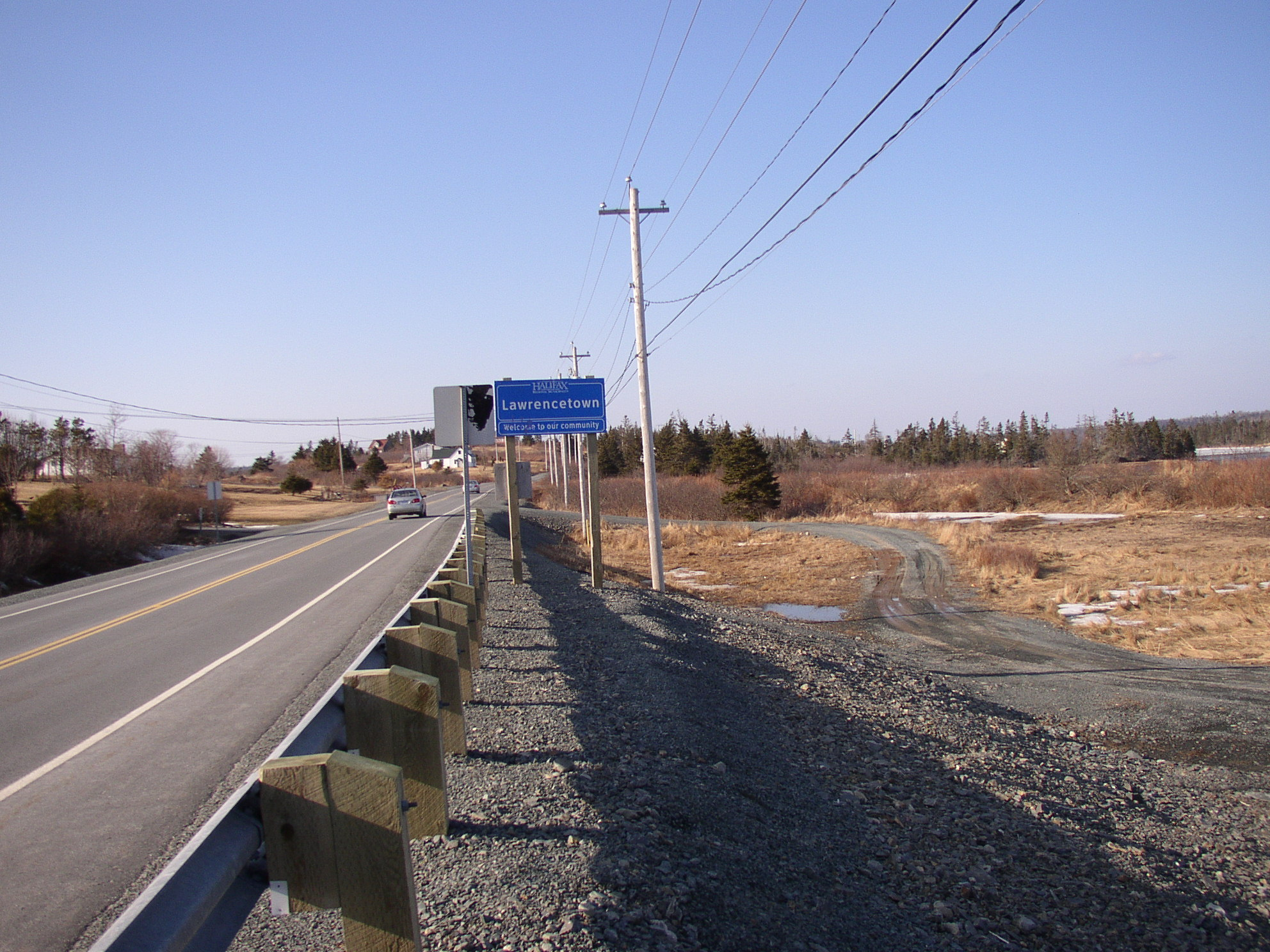
Route 207, part of Nova Scotia's Marine Drive scenic route, passes through East Lawrencetown.

Called Portland Street at its western end, the route starts at Alderney Drive (Trunk 7) across from the city hall of the former city of Dartmouth. There it proceeds where it intersects with Prince Albert Road (Trunk 7), Alderney Drive and Canal Street. Further along, Portland Street junctions with Route 322 at Pleasant Street, and Albert Street, an area in Dartmouth called "The five corners" . It passes through the Southdale area of Dartmouth, then expands to a four-lane street where it crosses the Circumferential Highway to the Portland valley area. it then extends up an incline named "Breakheart Hill " to the community of Cole Harbour.

=== Eastern Shore ===
In Cole Harbour, starting at Caldwell Road the road is named "Cole Harbour Road." At (Bissett Road) Route 207 narrows to two lanes. The road leads here to Lawrencetown Beach in Upper Lawerenceton. The route connects the communities of Dartmouth, Upper Lawrencetown, West Lawrencetown, Three Fathom Harbour, Seaforth, Grand Desert and West Chezzetcook, before ending in Porters Lake at Trunk 7 and Highway 107).

== Communities ==
- Dartmouth
- Cole Harbour
- Upper Lawrencetown
- West Lawrencetown
- Lawrencetown
- Lloy
- Three Fathom Harbour
- Seaforth
- Grand Desert
- West Chezzetcook
- Porters Lake

== See also ==
- List of Nova Scotia provincial highways
- Marine Drive (Nova Scotia)
