= Chezzetcook =

Chezzetcook may refer to the following places in Nova Scotia, Canada:

- Chezzetcook Lake
- East Chezzetcook, Nova Scotia
- Head of Chezzetcook, Nova Scotia
- Lower East Chezzetcook, Nova Scotia
- West Chezzetcook, Nova Scotia
