= Head of Chezzetcook, Nova Scotia =

Coordinates: 44°45′01″N 63°14′17″W

Head of Chezzetcook in Nova Scotia

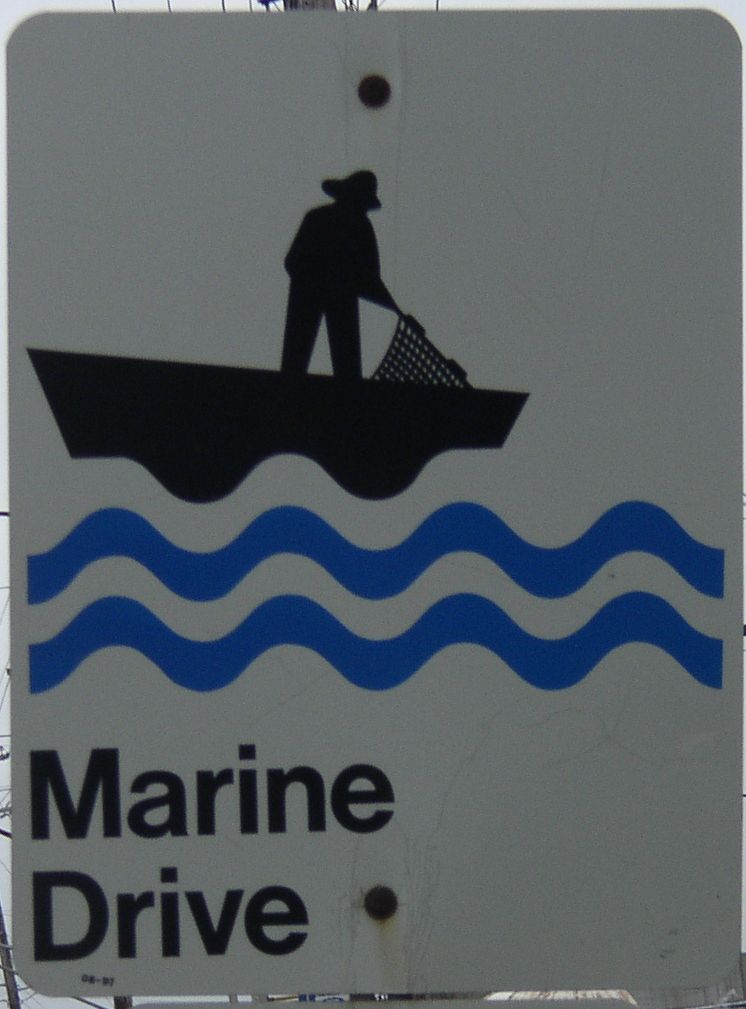
Off Marine Drive

Head of Chezzetcook is a rural community on the Eastern Shore Marine Drive route of Halifax Regional Municipality in Nova Scotia. The Head of Chezzetcook area begins at the intersections of routes 7 and 207, near Porters Lake and West Chezzetcook, and continues along the Marine Drive to Gaetz Brook. Head of Chezzetcook is a short commute to Downtown Halifax at 29.52 kilometers; and in its heyday was a major port of call for ships delivering supplies from the city to local gold miners and early settlers. A vista of the sea marks the Head of Chezzetcook Inlet, for which the Chezzetcooks are named; and a fork in the road for both East Chezzetcook and Conrod Settlement.

== History, culture and economics ==
Head of Chezzetcook

Early settlers of French, English, Scottish, German, and other descents populated the area. In the late 18th century, Acadian farmers supplied marsh hay to the newly founded Halifax, and lumberjacks supplied wood for building. Past industries included fish processing and a brick factory and today there still remains a saw mill at the Head of Chezzetcook. The area also saw a boom when gold was discovered a few miles away in East Chezzetcook.

Most of the historic buildings are no longer standing however: gas stations, the local post office, the church hall, and many little general stores have long since disappeared. On 1 July 1916 the railway officially opened, it passed through the Head of Chezzetcook Inlet, connected Dartmouth to Musquodoboit, and carried both passengers and freight. In 1985, years after the last train, the tracks were taken up which left miles of open trails of which some parts are designated for recreation.

There has been the formation of a Chezzetcook Historical Society which serves to preserve the culture and history of the Chezzetcooks. West and East Chezzetcook have much history in soft shell clam fishing. For years, people have been making a big part of their income digging clam in the Chezzetcook Inlet. The fishery today is in decline, due to overfishing, coastal development, and pollution, but with the works of The Eastern Shore Clam Fishers Association (ESCFA) and local clam fisherman, the future of the clam industry may become stable again.

== Geography and transportation ==
Routes 7 and 107 connect to metro Halifax as well as other communities along the Eastern Shore. The East Chezzetcook Road and Conrod Settlement Road is off of Trunk 7, connecting Head of Chezzetcook to East Chezzetcook, Lower East Chezzetcook and Conrod Settlement.

== Recreation and accommodation ==
Fresh water and ocean beaches, hiking and walking trails, ocean kayaking, sightseeing in the estuary, provincial parks, community centers. Vacation homes are the only places for overnight stays. There are facilities and stores nearby in Porters Lake. In spring 2020, the Gaetz Brook Greenway opened. The trail begins in East Chezzetcook.

== Education and schools ==
Over the years, several little red school houses came and went. Currently there are no operating schools at the Head of Chezzetcook, but the area is serviced by its surrounding neighborhoods. Students go to Porter's Lake Elementary, O'Connell Drive Elementary, Gaetz Brook Junior High and Eastern Shore District High School.

== Housing ==
Mainly single family homes consisting of a mix of older wood shingled cape and saltbox style houses along the shore, with more modern bungalow and larger homes in newer developments. This area is rural compared to neighboring Porters Lake which is mainly sub divided.

== Churches ==
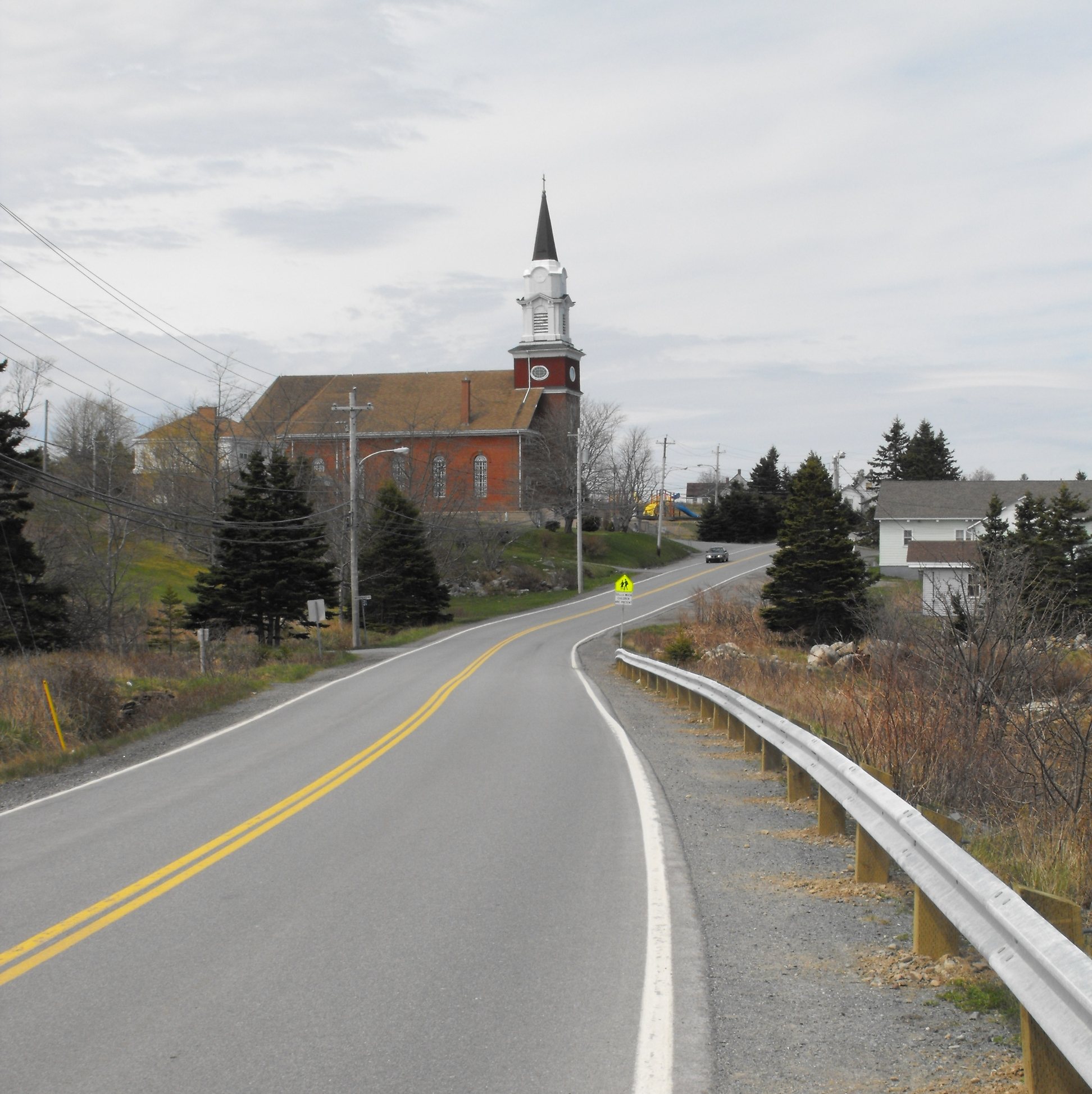
St. Anselm Church in West Chezzetcook

St. Barnabas Anglican church, one of five churches in the Parish of Seaforth, is the only church in Head of Chezzetcook. The area around the church was the former center of the community with a cemetery located both at the church in Head Chezzetcook and in Conrod Settlement. Christ Church, part of the Parish of Seaforth, is located in Lower East Chezzetcook.

There is one Catholic church, St. Genevieve, in East Chezzetcook. St. Anselms was a Catholic church in West Chezzetcook. Both churches are both in the same postal district. Both with a large community hall, they hold regular bingo and card games, as well as annual fairs and picnics, dances, and lobster dinners.

== Communications ==
- The postal Code is B0J 1N0
- The Telephone exchange is 902 827 -Aliant
- Internet – DSL -Aliant
- The nearest Post office is located in the Porters Lake area.

== Demographics ==
- Total Population – 2,020
- Total Dwellings – 865
- Total Land Area – 47.6805 km²
