= Three Fathom Harbour, Nova Scotia =

Community in Nova Scotia, Canada

Coordinates: 44°39′01″N 63°17′13″W

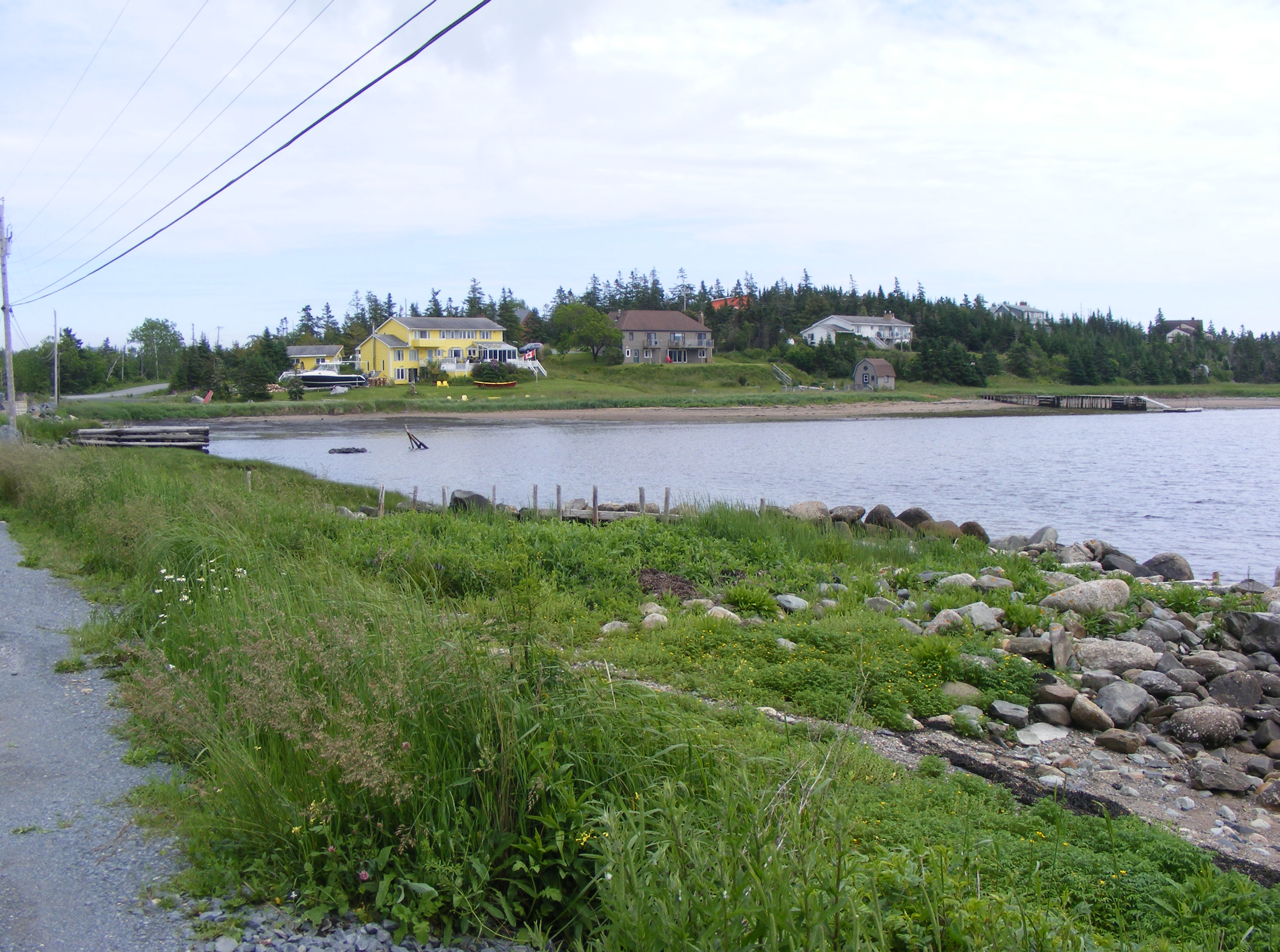
Three Fathom Harbour, July 2023.

Three Fathom Harbour is a fishing community on the Eastern Shore of the Halifax Regional Municipality in the Canadian province of Nova Scotia.

== Background and History ==
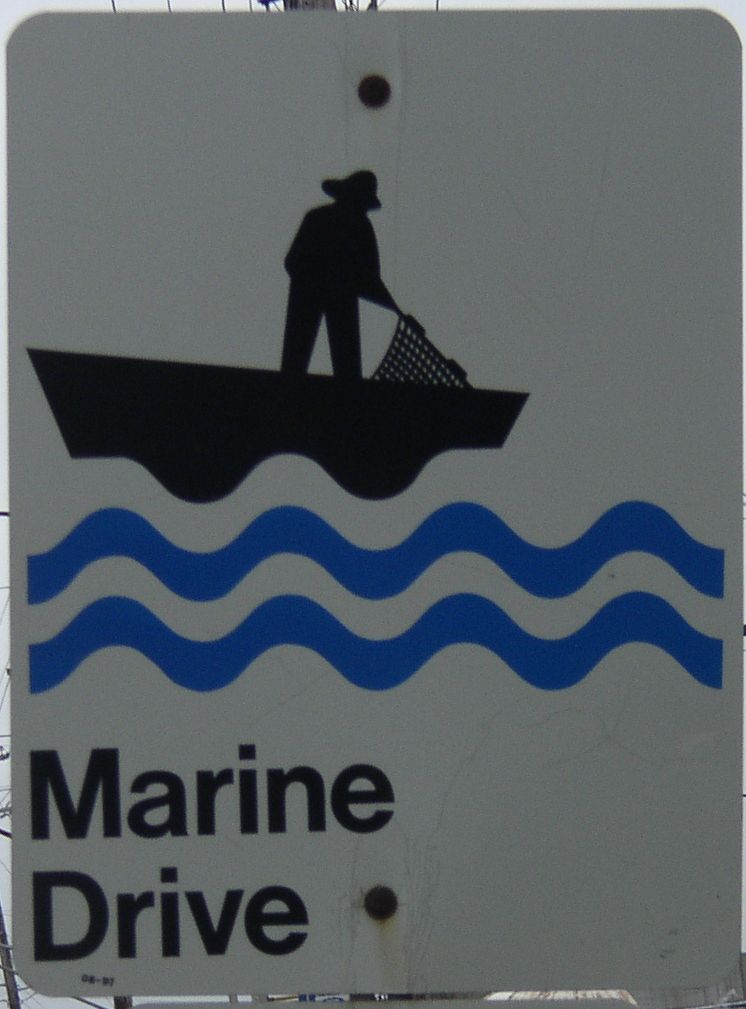
On Marine Drive

Originally a small fishing village outside Dartmouth, Nova Scotia along the 207 Hwy. The next community past Lawrencetown Beach, Three Fathom Harbour consists of several islands. One is connected to the mainland by a causeway (originally wooden) and was the main fishing community now referred to as the Fisherman's Reserve. Acadian fishermen from Chezzetcook and Grand Desert would spend their summers there in small fishing huts, working on their boats and would return to their family homes in the winter. Later, summer cottages started to spring up along with family homes. The main island was always residential with farms. It was a man made island with Rocky Run with waters leaving Porter's Lake at the western end, Porter's Lake at the north, and the Harbour at the south. The west end had a man made canal separating it from the main land. Originally, Seaforth was part of Three Fathom Harbour. The Canal and Rocky Run were entry points for salt water to run into Porter's Lake. The Canal end at the south of Porters Lake was a popular cottage area. The Three Fathom Harbour Road, was originally the main road, with a side road to Lower Three Fathom Harbour. The original Three Fathom Harbour school was on the west end of the "cove" along Three Fathom Harbour Road. Today it serves as a family home. Highway 207 was built and later paved in approximately 1960 and became the main road through the community. There are still fewer homes built along that route than on the Three Fathom Harbour Road, as the south side of the road is heavily muskeg. The north side has several short roadways to homes on Porter's Lake. The area is currently still an active fishing area. Many homes and cottages scatter the lake and ocean shores. It is now within commuting distance to Halifax/Dartmouth.

Three Fathom Harbour in Nova Scotia

== Communications ==
- The postal Code is B0J 1N0.
- The Telephone exchange is 902 827 -Aliant;
