= Preston, Nova Scotia =

Area of central Nova Scotia, Canada

Coordinates: 44°42′56.4″N 63°26′3.2″W

Preston in Nova Scotia

Preston is an area in central Nova Scotia, Canada in the Halifax Regional Municipality, located on Trunk 7. Preston includes the subdivisions of East Preston, North Preston, Lake Major, Cherry Brook and Loon Lake. The definition sometimes extends to include Lake Echo. The population in 2021 was 3,140. This is a decline from 2016, when Preston had a population of 3,223.

== Background ==
Preston, once known as Preston Township, previously was geographically much larger. The community's boundaries stretched westward past Westphal to Highway 111, and eastward through what is now Lake Echo and Porter's Lake to Myra Road (including through East Preston), north to North Preston, and south through parts to the boundaries of Lawrencetown). No community is known strictly as "Preston", rather it refers to the area encompassed by those subdivisions, or in reference to the Preston Electoral District.

The area is believed to have been named after Preston, Lancashire, England or Thomas Preston, a British army officer involved in the Boston Massacre at the beginning of the American Revolution. It was among the areas where the Crown granted lands to Black Loyalists from the Thirteen Colonies; it had promised them freedom and resettled more than 3,000 former slaves in Nova Scotia. Reflecting its early history, Preston has the largest percentage of black people of any area in Canada; 69.4% of its population is black.

The Black Nova Scotian leader and clergyman, Richard Preston (b. 1792), took this surname after becoming reunited here with his mother, who was resettled in Preston along with others of the 2,000 black refugee slaves who gained freedom with the British during the War of 1812 in the United States. Richard had bought his freedom from slavery in Virginia as an adult, and then went to Nova Scotia in search of his mother. He became a prominent Baptist preacher and political leader.

Wayne Adams, the first Black MLA and Cabinet Minister in Nova Scotia, is from East Preston. Corrine Sparks the first Black female Judge in Canada is from Lake Loon. A World Heavyweight contender in boxing, Kirk Johnson, is from North Preston.

== Notable residents ==
- Wayne Adams (b. 1943), politician
- Gary Beals (b. 1982), R&B singer and Canadian Idol finalist
- Custio Clayton (b. 1987), boxer
- Kirk Johnson (b. 1972), boxer
- Mary Jane Katzmann (1828–1890), historian, poet, and editor
- Dwayne Provo (b. 1970), politician and athlete
- Corrine Sparks (b. 1953), Judge
