= Nova Scotia Route 328 =

Highway in Nova Scotia, Canada

Route 328

Route information
- Maintained by Nova Scotia Department of Transportation and Infrastructure Renewal
- Length: 3 km (1.9 mi)

Major junctions
- South end: Route 207 in Upper Lawrencetown
- North end: Hwy 107 in Lake Major

Location
- Country: Canada
- Province: Nova Scotia
- Counties: Halifax Regional Municipality

Highway system
- Provincial highways in Nova Scotia; 100-series
← Route 327	→ Route 329

Route 328 is a short collector road in the Canadian province of Nova Scotia.

It is located in the Halifax Regional Municipality and connects Lake Major at exit 6 of Highway 107/Trunk 7 with Upper Lawrencetown at Route 207 via Ross Road.

== Communities ==
- Upper Lawrencetown
- Lake Major

== See also ==
- List of Nova Scotia provincial highways
