= Nova Scotia Trunk 7 =

Highway in Nova Scotia

Trunk 7

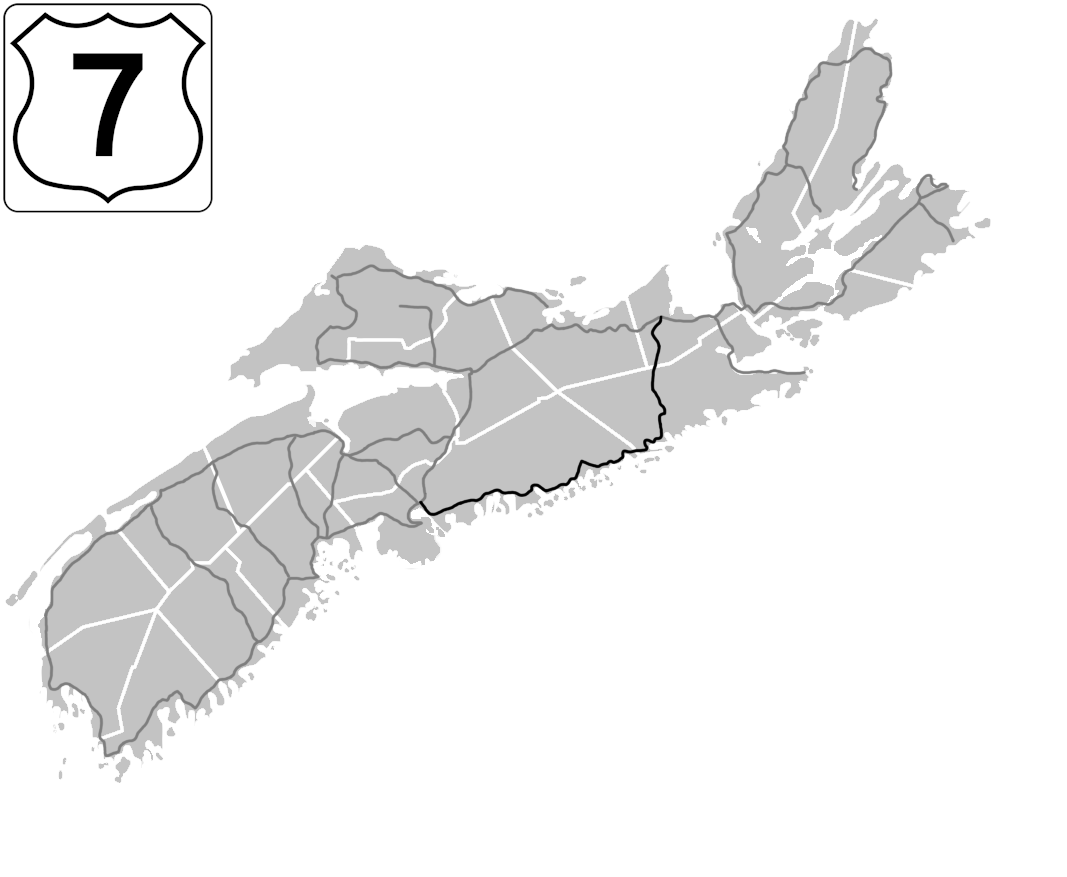
- Trunk 7 shown in black, other trunk roads shown in dark gray

Route information
- Maintained by Department of Transportation and Infrastructure Renewal
- Length: 272 km (169 mi)

Major junctions
- West end: Trunk 2 in Bedford
- Bedford Bypass in Bedford; Hwy 111 in Dartmouth; Hwy 107 in Dartmouth; Hwy 107 near Cherry Brook; Hwy 107 in Musquodoboit Harbour; Hwy 104 (TCH) in Antigonish
- Northeast end: Trunk 4 in Antigonish

Location
- Country: Canada
- Province: Nova Scotia
- Counties: Halifax Regional Municipality, Guysborough, Antigonish
- Towns: Antigonish

Highway system
- Provincial highways in Nova Scotia; 100-series
← Trunk 6	→ Trunk 8

Nova Scotia Trunk 7 is part of the Canadian province of Nova Scotia's system of Trunk Highways. The route runs from Bedford to Antigonish, along the Eastern Shore for a distance of 269 kilometres (167 mi). Part of Trunk 7 is known as the Marine Drive.

== Route description ==
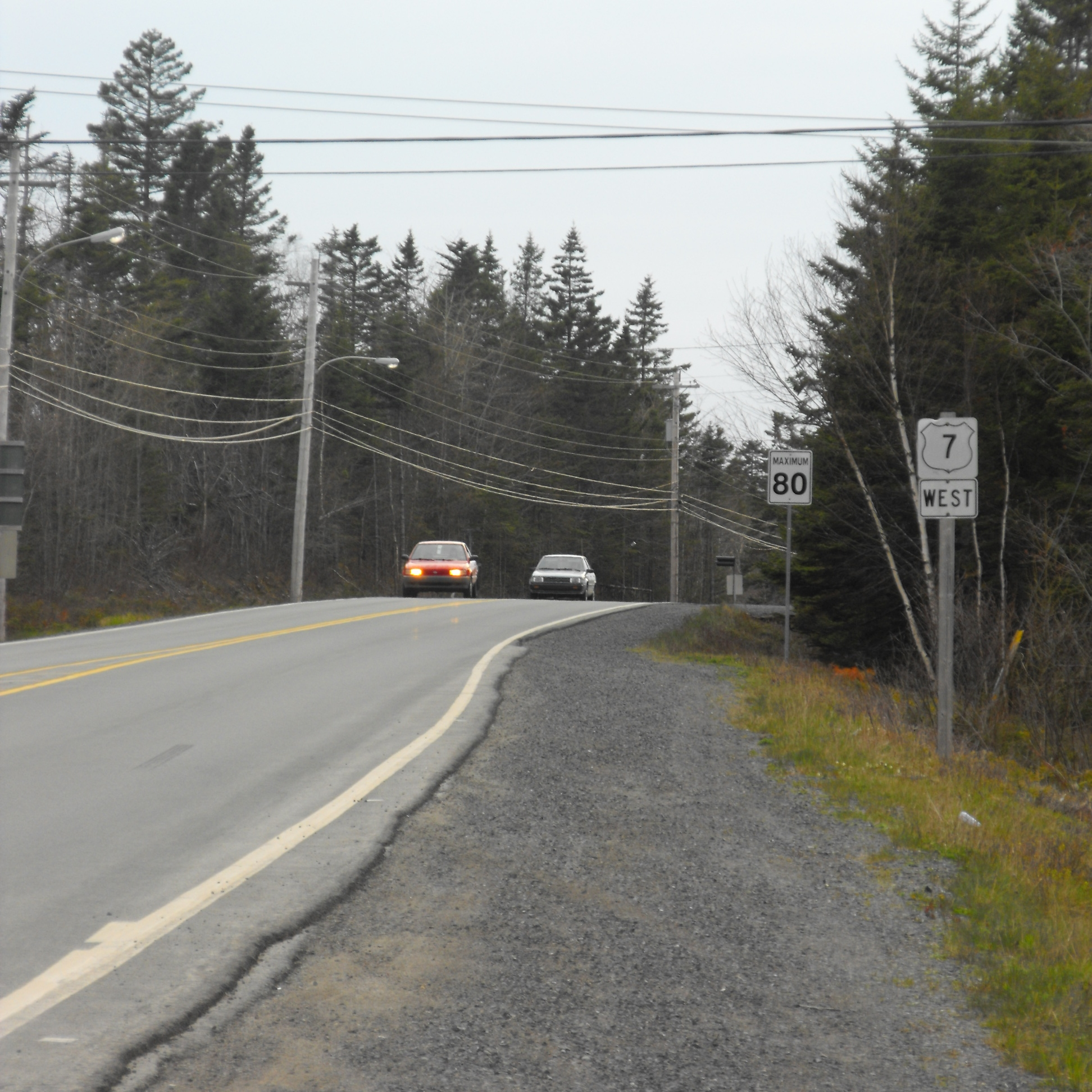
Nova Scotia Trunk 7

=== Bedford ===
Historically, Trunk 7 traveled from Main Road (now the Bedford Highway) to Hatchery Lane to Wardour Drive to Dartmouth Road. The route originally ran for approximately 280 kilometers. It became shorter when a new section between Wardour Drive and the future Bedford Highway was created, concurrently with when Trunk 1 ended in Halifax (until 1970). The Chickenburger was relocated when the original location was torn down, due to the creation of this new highway section. Trunk 7 was a two-lane highway between Bedford and Dartmouth until the 1960s.

=== Dartmouth ===
From Bedford at the intersection of Trunk 2, Trunk 7 leaves to the southeast along the eastern shore of the Bedford Basin, then climbs Magazine Hill next to the Canadian Forces Magazine and enters Dartmouth on Windmill Road. Through Downtown Dartmouth, it is known as Alderney Drive, which turns into Prince Albert Road past Sullivan's Pond as it runs along the shore of Lake Banook. At Grahams Grove Park, Trunk 7 continues through the Micmac Parclo, on to Main Street, past Highway 111 and to the community of Westphal, bypassing Cole Harbour to the south. Until 1970, Highway 7 ran from Portland Street to Prince Albert Road.

=== Eastern Shore ===
Just outside Dartmouth, three highways head towards the Eastern Shore: Route 207 leads out of Cole Harbour, passing the surfing beach at Lawrencetown. Near Preston, Route 107 and Trunk 7 separate. Highway 107 and Trunk 7 continue eastward through the African Canadian community of East Preston and the exurban communities of Lake Echo, Porters Lake and Head of Chezzetcook to Musquodoboit Harbour, where Highway 107 ends.

Trunk 7 continues to the east, twisting along numerous inlets of the Atlantic Ocean past some of the longest beaches in the province and through almost 300 coastal communities, such as Head of Jeddore, Sheet Harbour, Moser River, Necum Teuch and Ecum Secum. There are two junctions in Sheet Harbour with Route 224 and Route 374. Trunk 7 continues along the coast, passing through Port Dufferin and Moser River. In Ecum Secum, Trunk 7 crosses into Guysborough County. In Sherbrooke, Trunk 7 crosses the St. Mary's River and turns north, away from the ocean. The route follows the east bank of the river's valley, passing through Melrose and Aspen. In Lochaber, Trunk 7 crosses into Antigonish County. Trunk 7 then continues north through Salt Springs to its end at Antigonish, where it crosses Highway 104, part of the Trans-Canada Highway network, then terminates at West Street/Trunk 4 in Antigonish.

== Major intersections ==
County	Location	km	mi	Destinations	Notes
Halifax	Bedford	0.0	0.0	Trunk 2 (Bedford Highway) to Trunk 1 west / Hwy 101 / Hwy 102 – Lower Sackville, Waverley, Halifax	Trunk 7 western terminus
Halifax	Bedford	1.7	1.1	Bedford Bypass (Trunk 33 west) to Trunk 1 / Hwy 101 – Lower Sackville, Windsor	Westbound exit, eastbound entrance
Halifax	Dartmouth	5.0	3.1	Akerley Boulevard	To Hwy 107
Halifax	Dartmouth	6.4	4.0	Victoria Road (Route 322 east) to Hwy 111 – MacKay Bridge, Macdonald Bridge	
Halifax	Dartmouth	7.2	4.5	Hwy 111 (to A. Murray MacKay Bridge)	Passes under Hwy 111, no direct access, use Route 322
Halifax	Dartmouth	10.0	6.2	Angus L. Macdonald Bridge	Passes under MacDonald Bridge, no direct access, use Wyse Road
Halifax	Dartmouth	10.5	6.5	Wyse Road – Macdonald Bridge	
Halifax	Dartmouth	11.8	7.3	Portland Street (Route 207 east)	
Halifax	Dartmouth	12.0	7.5	Pleasant Street (Route 322 east)	West end of Route 322 concurrency
Halifax	Dartmouth	12.0	7.5	Ochterloney Street (Route 322 west)	East end of Route 322 concurrency
Halifax	Dartmouth	13.9– 14.5	8.6– 9.0	Hwy 111 to Hwy 107 / Hwy 118 / Route 207 / Micmac Boulevard – Airport, Cole Harbour, Shearwater, Eastern Passage Route 318 north (Braemar Drive) – Waverley	Hwy 111 exit 6
Halifax	Dartmouth	18.2	11.3	Hwy 107 to Hwy 118 – Airport, Waverley, Truro; To Route 207 / Forest Hills Parkway – Forest Hills, Cole Harbour	West end of Hwy 107 concurrency
Halifax	Cherry Brook	21.2	13.2	Ross Road (Route 328 south)	
Halifax		22.7	14.1	Hwy 107 east – Musquodoboit Harbour, Sheet Harbour	At-grade; east of Hwy 107 concurrency; Hwy 107 exit 17
Halifax	Porters Lake	39.5	24.5	To Hwy 107 / William Porter Connector – Musquodoboit Harbour, Dartmouth	
Halifax	Porters Lake	39.9	24.8	Route 207 west – West Chezzetcook, Lawrencetown	
Halifax	Musquodoboit Harbour	50.3	31.3	Hwy 107 west – Dartmouth, Halifax	At-grade; Hwy 107 eastern terminus
Halifax	Musquodoboit Harbour	52.9	32.9	Route 357 north – Meaghers Grant, Middle Musquodoboit	
Halifax	Sheet Harbour	123.4	76.7	Route 224 north to Route 336 – Marinette, Musquodoboit Valley	
Halifax	Sheet Harbour	126.9	78.9	Route 374 north – Trafalgar, Stellarton	
Guysborough	Stillwater	210.2	130.6	Route 211 east – Port Bickerton, Country Harbour Ferry, Canso	
Guysborough	Melrose	222.1	138.0	Route 348 north – Caledonia, New Glasgow	
Guysborough	Aspen	238.9	148.4	Route 347 north – Thorburn, New Glasgow	
Guysborough	Lochaber	248.7	154.5	Route 276 east to Route 316 – Goshen, Upper South River, Lower South River	
Antigonish	Antigonish	277.9	172.7	Hwy 104 (TCH) – New Glasgow, Cape Breton	Hwy 104 exit 32
Antigonish	Antigonish	278.2	172.9	Trunk 4 – New Glasgow, Cape Breton Route 245 north (Main Street) to Route 337 – Antigonish	Trunk 7 eastern terminus; continues as Route 245
1.000 mi = 1.609 km; 1.000 km = 0.621 mi: Concurrency terminus; Incomplete access

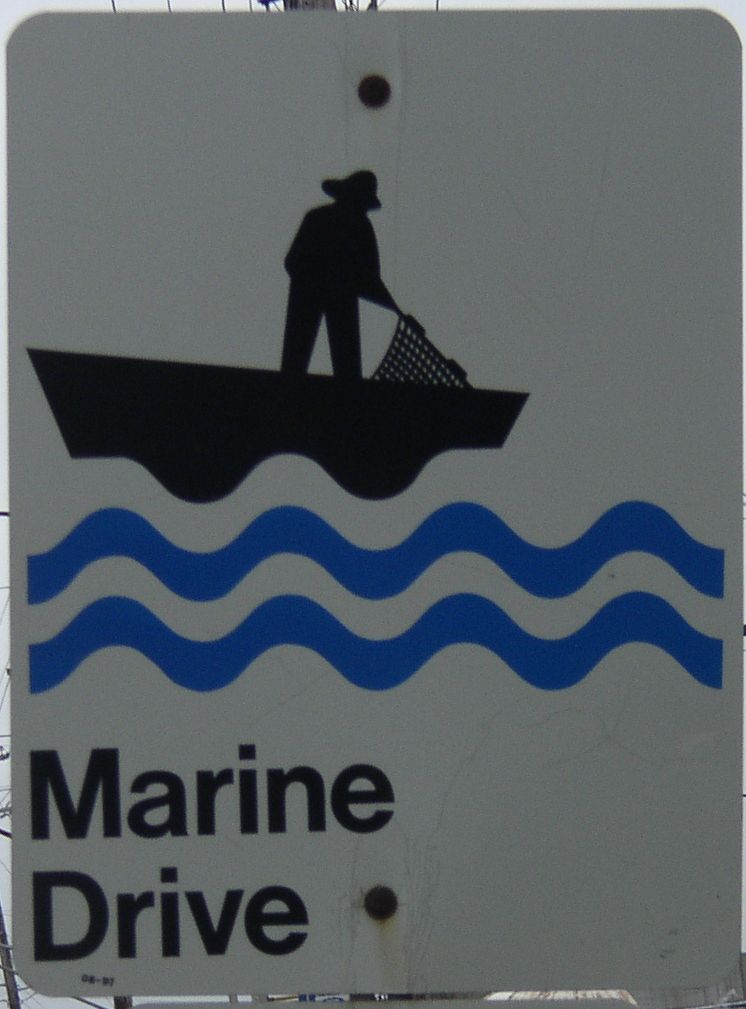
Part of the Marine Drive
