= List of television series revivals =

In television, a revival is a television series that returns to produce new episodes after being off the air for a certain amount of time, particularly due to cancellation.

== Overview ==
Note: For the sake of simplicity, game shows, due to the large number of international franchises and the much greater rate of cancellation and revival among them, are largely absent from this list. Anthology series revivals, though they may include episodes that are remakes of ones from the earlier series, are generally included.

Legend: "—" = denotes shared name with original work.

Original work	Start date	End date	Revival	Revival start date	Revival end date	Country of origin	Refs.
12 oz. Mouse (Adult Swim)	2005	2007	12 oz. Mouse	2018; 2020	2020	United States	
24	2001	2010	24: Live Another Day	2014		United States	
Absolutely Fabulous	1992	1996	Absolutely Fabulous	2001	2004	United Kingdom	
Adventure Time	2010	2018	Adventure Time: Distant Lands (HBO Max)	2020	2021	United States	
Adventure Time	2010	2018	Adventure Time: Fionna and Cake	2023	present	United States	
Agony	1979	1981	Agony Again	1995		United Kingdom	
The Amazing World of Gumball	2011	2019	The Wonderfully Weird World of Gumball	2025	present	United Kingdom/United States	
Angelina Ballerina	2002	2006	Angelina Ballerina: The Next Steps	2009	2010	United Kingdom	
Animaniacs	1993	1998	Animaniacs (Hulu)	2020	2023	United States	
Are You Afraid of the Dark? (Nickelodeon)	1992	2000	—	2019	2022	Canada/United States	
Arrested Development	2003	2006	—	2013	2019	United States	
Barney & Friends (PBS)	1992	2010	Barney's World	2024	2025	United States	
Beavis and Butt-Head	1993	1997	—	2011		United States	
Beavis and Butt-Head	1993	1997	—	2022	present	United States	-
Beverly Hills, 90210	1990	2000	90210 (The CW)	2008	2013	United States	
Beverly Hills, 90210	1990	2000	BH90210	2019		United States	
Blue's Clues/Blue's Room	1996	2008	Blue's Clues & You!	2019	2024	United States	
Boy Meets World	1993	2000	Girl Meets World (Disney Channel)	2014	2017	United States	
The Brady Bunch (ABC)	1969	1974	The Bradys	1990		United States	
The Brothers Garcia (Nickelodeon)	2000	2004	The Garcias	2022		United States	
Burke's Law	1963	1966	Burke's Law	1994	1995	United States	
Bubble Guppies	2011	2016	—	2019	2023	United States	
Caillou	1997	2003	—	2006	2011	Canada	
Caillou	1997	2003	Caillou (Family Jr.)	2023	present	Canada	
The Carol Burnett Show	1967	1978	Carol Burnett & Company	1979		United States	
The Carol Burnett Show	1967	1978	—	1991		United States	
Cash Cab	2005	2012	—	2017	present	United States	
Cero en conducta	1998	2003	La escuelita VIP	2005	2005	Mexico	
Clifford the Big Red Dog	2000	2003	Clifford the Big Red Dog	2019	2021	United States	
Clone High (MTV)	2002	2003	—	2023	2024	United States	
Criminal Minds (CBS)	2005	2020	—	2022	present	United States	
CSI: Crime Scene Investigation	2000	2015	CSI: Vegas	2021	2024	United States	
Dallas	1978	1991	Dallas (TNT)	2012	2014	United States	
Danger Mouse (ITV)	1981	1992	Danger Mouse (BBC)	2015	2019	United Kingdom	
Daredevil	2015	2018	Daredevil: Born Again	2025	present	United States	
Darkwing Duck (Syndication)	1991	1992	Darkwing Duck	TBA	TBA	United States	
Dexter (Showtime)	2006	2013	Dexter: New Blood (Showtime)	2021	2022	United States	
Dexter (Showtime)	2006	2013	Dexter: Resurrection (Paramount+)	2025	Present	United States	
Dexter's Laboratory	1996	1998	—	2001	2003	United States	
Dino Dan	2010	2020	Dino Dex	2024	present	United States	
Doctor Who	1963	1989	—	2005	2025	United Kingdom	
Dolly	1976	1977	Dolly	1987	1988	United States	
The Fairly OddParents	2001	2017	The Fairly OddParents: Fairly Odder (Paramount+)	2022	2023	United States	
The Fairly OddParents	2001	2017	The Fairly OddParents: A New Wish	2024		United States	
Family Guy	1999	2003	—	2005	present	United States	
Fantasy Island	1977	1984	Fantasy Island	2021	2023	United States	
Figure It Out	1997	2000	—	2012	2013	United States	
Fraggle Rock	1983	1987	Fraggle Rock: Back to the Rock	2022	present	United States	
Franklin	1997	2004	Franklin and Friends (Treehouse)	2010	2014	Canada	
Frasier	1993	2004	Frasier (2023 TV series)	2023	2024	United States	
Full House (ABC)	1987	1995	Fuller House	2016	2020	United States	
Futurama	1999	2003	—	2008	2013	United States	
Futurama	1999	2003	—	2023	present	United States	
Get Smart	1965	1970	Get Smart	1995		United States	
Ghost Hunters	2004	2016	—	2019	present	United States	
Ghostwriter (PBS)	1992	1995	Ghostwriter	2019	2022	United States	
Gilmore Girls (The WB/CW)	2000	2007	Gilmore Girls: A Year in the Life	2016		United States	
Heartbreak High	1994	1999	Heartbreak High	2022	2026	Australia	
Henry Danger	2014	2020	Danger Force	2020	2024	United States	
Heroes	2006	2010	Heroes Reborn	2015	2016	United States	
Hi-5	1999	2011	Hi-5 House	2013	2016	Australia	
Hi-5	1999	2011	—	2017		Australia	
Hope for Wildlife	2009	2020	Hope for Wildlife: The Next Generation	2025	present	Canada	
iCarly	2007	2012	iCarly (Paramount+)	2021	2023	United States	
Johnny Test (Kids' WB!)	2005	2014	Johnny Test	2021	2022	Canada/United States	
Jurassic World Camp Cretaceous	2020	2022	Jurassic World: Chaos Theory	2024	2025	United States	
The Kids in the Hall	1989	1995	—	2022	present	Canada	
King of the Hill	1997	2010	—	2025	present	United States	
Law & Order	1990	2010	Law & Order	2022	present	United States	
Leave It to Beaver	1957	1963	The New Leave It to Beaver	1983	1989	United States	
Legends of the Hidden Temple (Nickelodeon)	1993	1995	—	2021	2022	United States	
Leverage	2008	2012	Leverage: Redemption	2021	2025	United States	
Live PD	2016	2020	On Patrol: Live	2022	present	United States	
The Liver Birds	1969	1979	—	1996		United Kingdom	
Mad About You	1992	1999	—	2019		United States	
Mama's Family	1983	1984	—	1987	1990	United States	
The Magic School Bus (PBS)	1994	1997	The Magic School Bus Rides Again	2017	2020	Canada/United States	
The McLaughlin Group	1982	2016	The McLaughlin Group	2018; 2019	2018; 2020	United States	
Melrose Place	1992	1999	Melrose Place (The CW)	2009	2010	United States	
Mission: Impossible	1966	1973	Mission: Impossible	1988	1990	United States	
Mickey Mouse Clubhouse	2006	2016	Mickey Mouse Clubhouse+	2025		United States	
Mr. Bean: The Animated Series	2002	2019	—	2025	present	United Kingdom	
Mr. Show with Bob and David	1995	1998	W/ Bob & David	2015		United States	
Muppet Babies (1984 TV series)	1984	1991	Muppet Babies (2018 TV series) (Disney Junior)	2018	2022	United States	
Murphy Brown	1988	1998	Murphy Brown	2018		United States	
My Little Pony: Friendship is Magic (The Hub/Discovery Family)	2010	2019	My Little Pony: Make Your Mark	2022	2023	United States	
My Super Sweet 16	2005	2011	—	2017		United States	
Mystery Science Theater 3000	1988	1999	—	2017	present	United States	
Night Court	1984	1992	Night Court	2023	2025	United States	
Ninjago (Cartoon Network)	2011	2022	Ninjago: Dragons Rising	2023	present	Denmark/Canada	
Octonauts	2010	2021	Octonauts: Above & Beyond	2021	present	Ireland/United Kingdom	
Odd Squad	2014	2022	—	2024	present	United States	
Oggy and the Cockroaches	1998	2019	Oggy and the Cockroaches: Next Generation	2022	present	France	
On the Record	2002	2016	For the Record	2016	2017	United States	
On the Record	2002	2016	The Record	2022	present	United States	
The Outer Limits	1963	1965	The Outer Limits	1995	2002	United States	
Panty & Stocking with Garterbelt	2010	2011	New Panty & Stocking with Garterbelt	2025	present	Japan/United States	
Party Down	2009	2010	—	2023		United States	
Phineas and Ferb	2007	2015	—	2025	present	United States	
The Powerpuff Girls	1998	2005	Powerpuff Girls Z	2006	2007	Japan	
The Powerpuff Girls	1998	2005	The Powerpuff Girls	2016	2019	United States	
Prison Break	2005	2009	—	2017		United States	
The Proud Family (Disney Channel)	2001	2005	The Proud Family: Louder and Prouder	2022	2026	United States	
Punky Brewster	1984	1988	Punky Brewster (Peacock)	2021		United States	
Quantum Leap	1989	1993	Quantum Leap	2022	2024	United States	
ReBoot (YTV)	1994	2001	ReBoot: The Guardian Code	2018		Canada	
Regular Show	2010	2017	Regular Show: The Lost Tapes	2026		United States	
Ren and Stimpy	1991	1995	Ren & Stimpy "Adult Party Cartoon"	2003	2003	United States	
Reno 911!	2003	2009	—	2020	2022	United States	
Roseanne	1988	1997	—	2018		United States	
Roseanne	1988	1997	The Conners	2018	2025	United States	
Rugrats	1991	2004	Rugrats (Paramount+)	2021	2024	United States	
Sai de Baixo	1996	2002	—	2013		Brazil	
Samurai Jack	2001	2004	—	2017		United States	
Sanford and Son	1972	1977	Sanford	1980	1981	United States	
Saved by the Bell	1989	1993	Saved by the Bell (Peacock)	2020	2021	United States	
Scrubs	2001	2010	—	2026	present	United States	
The Smurfs	1981	1989	The Smurfs	2021	present	Belgium	
Star Wars: The Clone Wars	2008	2013	—	2020		United States	
Strawberry Shortcake	2003	2008	Strawberry Shortcake: Berry Bitty Adventures	2010	2015	France/Canada/United States	
Strawberry Shortcake	2003	2008	Strawberry Shortcake: Berry in the Big City!	2021	present	United States/Canada	
Tara Duncan	2010	2011	Tara Duncan	2022	2023	TBA	
Till Death Us Do Part	1966	1968	—	1972	1975	United Kingdom	
Till Death Us Do Part	1966	1968	Till Death...	1981		United Kingdom	
Till Death Us Do Part	1966	1968	In Sickness and in Health	1985	1992	United Kingdom	
Teletubbies	1997	2001	—	2015	2018	United Kingdom	
That's So Raven	2003	2007	Raven's Home	2017	2023	United States	
That '70s Show	1998	2006	That '90s Show	2023	2024	United States	
Tiny Toon Adventures	1990	1992	Tiny Toon Looniversity	2023	2025	United States	
Total Drama	2007	2014	—	2023	TBA	Canada	
Total Drama	2007	2014	The Ridonculous Race	2015	2016	Canada	
Total Drama	2007	2014	Total DramaRama	2018	2022	Canada	
Totally Spies	2001	2013	—	2024	present	France/Canada	
Trading Spaces	2000	2008	—	2018	2019	United States	
Transformers: Rescue Bots	2012	2016	Transformers: Rescue Bots Academy	2019	2021	United States	
The Story of Tracy Beaker	2002	2005					
The Story of Tracy Beaker	2002	2005	Tracy Beaker Returns	2010	2012	United Kingdom	
The Story of Tracy Beaker	2002	2005	The Dumping Ground	2013	present	United Kingdom	
The Story of Tracy Beaker	2002	2005	My Mum Tracy Beaker	2021		United Kingdom	
The Story of Tracy Beaker	2002	2005	The Beaker Girls	2021	2023	United Kingdom	
The Twilight Zone	1959	1964	The Twilight Zone (1985)	1985	1989	United States	
The Twilight Zone	1959	1964	The Twilight Zone (2002)	2002	2003	United States	
The Twilight Zone	1959	1964	The Twilight Zone (2019)	2019	2020	United States	
The Suite Life of Zack & Cody	2005	2008	The Suite Life on Deck	2008	2011	United States	
The Wonder Pets	2006	2016	Wonder Pets: In the City	2024	present	United States	
Tuca & Bertie	2019	2019	Tuca & Bertie (Adult Swim version)	2021	2022	United States	
Twin Peaks	1990	1991	Twin Peaks: The Return	2017		United States	
Veronica Mars	2004	2007	Veronica Mars	2019		United States	
What's Happening!!	1976	1979	What's Happening Now!!	1985	1988	United States	
Whose Line Is It Anyway?	1998	2007	Whose Line Is It Anyway?	2013	2024	United States	
Will & Grace	1998	2006	Will & Grace	2017	2020	United States	
Wizards of Waverly Place	2007	2012	Wizards Beyond Waverly Place	2024	2026	United States	
WKRP in Cincinnati	1978	1982	The New WKRP in Cincinnati	1991	1993	United States	
X-Men: The Animated Series	1992	1997	X-Men '97	2024	Present	United States	
Xiaolin Showdown	2003	2006	Xiaolin Chronicles	2013	2015	United States	
Yo Gabba Gabba!	2007	2015	Yo Gabba GabbaLand!	2024	present	United States	
Young Justice	2010	2013	Young Justice: Outsiders	2019	2022	United States	
The X-Files	1993	2002	The X-Files	2016	2018	United States	

== See also ==
- List of television spinoffs
