= Acadian House Museum =

Coordinates: 44.706212°N 63.261616°W

- L'Acadie de Chezzetcook
- Established: 2000; 26 years ago house built: 1850; 176 years ago
- Location: 79 Hill Road; West Chezzetcook, Nova Scotia
- Type: Open air museum
- Collection size: +1,000
- Visitors: 1,000 (2013)
- Presidents: Beverly Hugli, Chair
- Website: http://www.acadiedechezzetcook.ca/en/ http://acadiantearoom.com/

Acadian House Museum is a museum in West Chezzetcook, Nova Scotia, Canada. It opened in 1997 and is both a living and interpretive museum. It consists of five buildings, two of which are original to the site. The Bellefontaine house as it is known, is believed to have been built in 1850 by Joseph Bellefontaine. It passed through seven different owners, many of which were of the Bellfontaine family before coming into the hands of the West Chezzetcook & Grand Desert Community Interest Group, who then converted the house into a museum.

== History ==
The Acadian House was built in 1850 by Joseph Bellefontaine, who left the house to his wife, Céleste (Bonnevie) Bellefontaine upon his death in 1897. Céleste then passed the house to her brothers, Georges and Oliver Bonnevie. Georges' daughter, Jenny, bought the house from her father and uncle in 1919. Jenny and her husband ran a small store from the side porch from 1919 until 1946. In 1946, Jenny passed the house on to James Redmond, who was a distant relative. In 1960, Eugène Bellefontaine bought the house, and then passed it on to his son, Benjamin Bellefontaine, in 1973. The West Chezzetcook & Grand Desert Community Interest Group bought the house from Benjamin in 1997, converting it into a museum and officially opening in 2000.

== Site ==
The Acadian House Museum site has three buildings dedicated to tours, the "Gallery House" serves the role of introducing guests to the history of Chezzetcook and is the gift shop. The Gallery House is not native to the site, originally being built in Grand Desert, Nova Scotia and was brought to the site in 2000 for the museum. "La Musée" (The Museum) which is decorated with period accurate artifacts on the first floor, the second floor being off limits to the public. "La Cabano" (The Shed) holds artifacts pertaining to agricultural activities, items for fishing, raising livestock, and various tools. La Cabano is a replica shed built for the museum.

"La Grange" (The Barn) is used primarily for events, and was built in 2005 to look like a period specific barn, but with modern construction and amenities such as dry walling, an oil stove, running water and electricity.

La Cuisine de Brigitte (Also known as The Tearoom) is a cafe independent from the museum, owned by Donna Goldworthy. The Tearoom specializes in serving traditional Acadian food, and often caters to events hosted in conjunction with the museum.

== Museum ==
Very little renovation has been done to the house since it was purchased in 1997. The upstairs, which was unfinished, was finished to be used as storage for artifacts. Ceilings and floors have been redone, all under the advice of a consultant's report and the research of a local historian. Fortunately, the layout of the house remains untouched.

The museum is a combination living and interpretive museum. The museum itself makes for the living section. Careful research went into recreating an accurate representation of what was common of a kitchen and pantry in the 1850s. The back half of the museum are the reconstructed parlour and master bedroom. The final room houses varied temporary exhibitions. As of 2020, there is an antique clothing exhibit inside. The interpretive section can be seen in the Gallery, where guests can view the industries room, genealogy room, and an upstairs that houses religious artifacts, mostly from the local church St. Anselm's.

The Museum has a tradition of hiring bilingual, local students for their summer tour-giving staff.

== Seasonal events ==
Though the museum's regular season only runs from July to August, it hosts many local events throughout the year. During the summer, an open house is often held, as well as Canada Day and Feast of Assumption celebrations. Day camps for children, focusing on teaching the French language and local history, are also held during the summer. During the fall and winter, Halloween, Christmas and New Year celebrations are held. Most events hosted at the museum feature live music from local talents, butter-making, clam-shelling and outdoor oven-baking demonstrations, and free museum tours.

== See also ==
- List of museums in Nova Scotia
