= Nova Scotia Route 322 =

Highway in Nova Scotia, Canada

Coordinates: 44°38′3.1″N 63°31′26.7″W

Route 322

Route information
- Maintained by Nova Scotia Department of Transportation and Infrastructure Renewal and the Halifax Regional Municipality
- Length: 22 km (14 mi)

Major junctions
- West end: Trunk 7 in Dartmouth
- Hwy 111 / Trunk 7 / Route 207 in Dartmouth
- East end: Route 207 in Cole Harbour

Location
- Country: Canada
- Province: Nova Scotia
- Counties: Halifax Regional Municipality

Highway system
- Provincial highways in Nova Scotia; 100-series
← Route 321	→ Route 324

Route 322 is a collector road in the Canadian province of Nova Scotia.

It is located in the Halifax Regional Municipality and connects southeastern Dartmouth at Trunk 7 with Cole Harbour at Route 207.

The route follows "Pleasant Street" in the former city of Dartmouth from its western terminus at the intersection with Prince Albert Road (Trunk 7) to the old Dartmouth city limit at Woodside. From Shearwater to Eastern Passage Pleasant Street becomes "Main Road." From that point, it follows "Cow Bay Road", "Dyke Road" and "Bissett Road" to its eastern terminus at the intersection with Route 207 (Cole Harbour Road) in Cole Harbour.

It is part of the Marine Drive scenic travelway.

== Communities ==
- Dartmouth
- Eastern Passage
- Cow Bay
- Rainbow Haven
- Cole Harbour

== Images ==
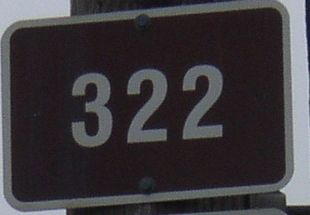
Sign for Route 322

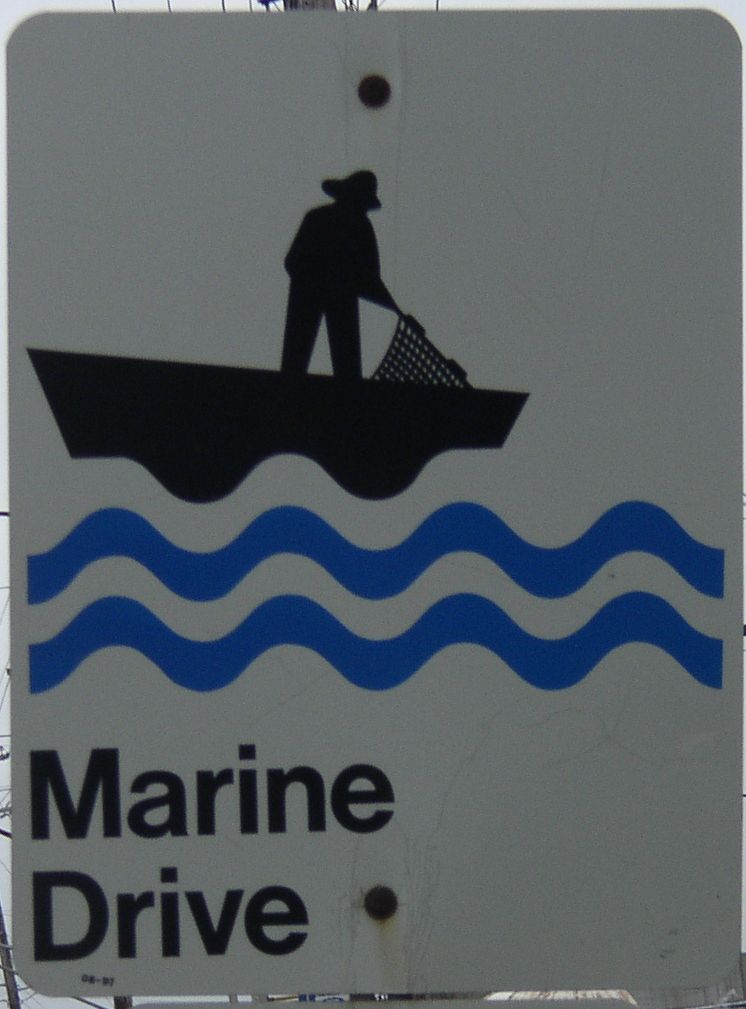
Sign for Marine Drive Trail

== See also ==
- List of Nova Scotia provincial highways
