= West Lawrencetown, Nova Scotia =

Coordinates: 44°40′05″N 63°22′43″W

'West Lawrencetown in Nova Scotia

West Lawrencetown is a residential community within the Halifax Regional Municipality Nova Scotia on the Eastern Shore on Route 207 along the scenic route Marine Drive.

== History ==
Despite the British Conquest of Acadia in 1710, Nova Scotia remained primarily occupied by Catholic Acadians and Mi'kmaq. Father Le Loutre's War began when Edward Cornwallis arrived to establish Halifax with 13 transports on June 21, 1749. By unilaterally establishing Halifax the British were violating earlier treaties with the Mi'kmaq (1726), which were signed after Dummer's War. The British quickly began to build other settlements. To guard against Mi'kmaq, Acadian and French attacks on the new Protestant settlements, British fortifications were erected in Halifax (1749), Dartmouth (1750), Bedford (Fort Sackville) (1751), Lunenburg (1753) and Lawrencetown (1754).

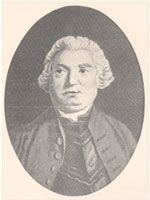
Charles Lawrence

In 1754, Nova Scotia's Lieutenant Governor Charles Lawrence, mindful of the threat the French posed at Fortress Louisbourg on Cape Breton Island, of the intentions of the Mi'kmaq and the Acadians, offered land grants to twenty families, who referred to their settlement as Lawrence's Town, which became Lawrencetown.

== Geography ==
Situated approximately 24 km east of Halifax Harbour, West Lawrencetown is located on a peninsula in the Atlantic Ocean formed by Cole Harbour to the west and Lawrencetown Lake (a natural harbour) to the east. The community of Upper Lawrencetown is located northwest along the Highway 107 corridor and the coastal community of Lawrencetown is to the southeast where Lawrencetown Beach Provincial Park is situated.

The area has a unique micro climate as a result of the shallow waters of Cole Harbour and Lawrencetown Lake which are heated by the daytime sun and retained by an abandoned railway embankment constructed across the waterway which acts as a barrier to tidal exchange. As a result, West Lawrencetown experiences fewer fog days compared to other areas along the Eastern Shore.

== Beaches ==
West Lawrencetown is also the home of three beaches. Lawrencetown Beach, a south-facing stretch of sand that unfurls lazily for nearly 1.5 km (1 mi), is renowned as a prime destination for local and international surfers, located along Route 207, twenty-five miles from the hustle and cosmopolitan bustle of downtown Halifax. The second beach is Conrad's Beach located at the end of Conrad Road. Stoney Beach is located on the 207 west of Lawrencetown Beach.

Lawrencetown Beach is a provincial park and was one of the first beaches in the province to be supervised by the Nova Scotia Lifeguard Service who have been on duty there since 1973.
