= Porters Lake, Nova Scotia =

Rural community in Nova Scotia, Canada

Porters Lake
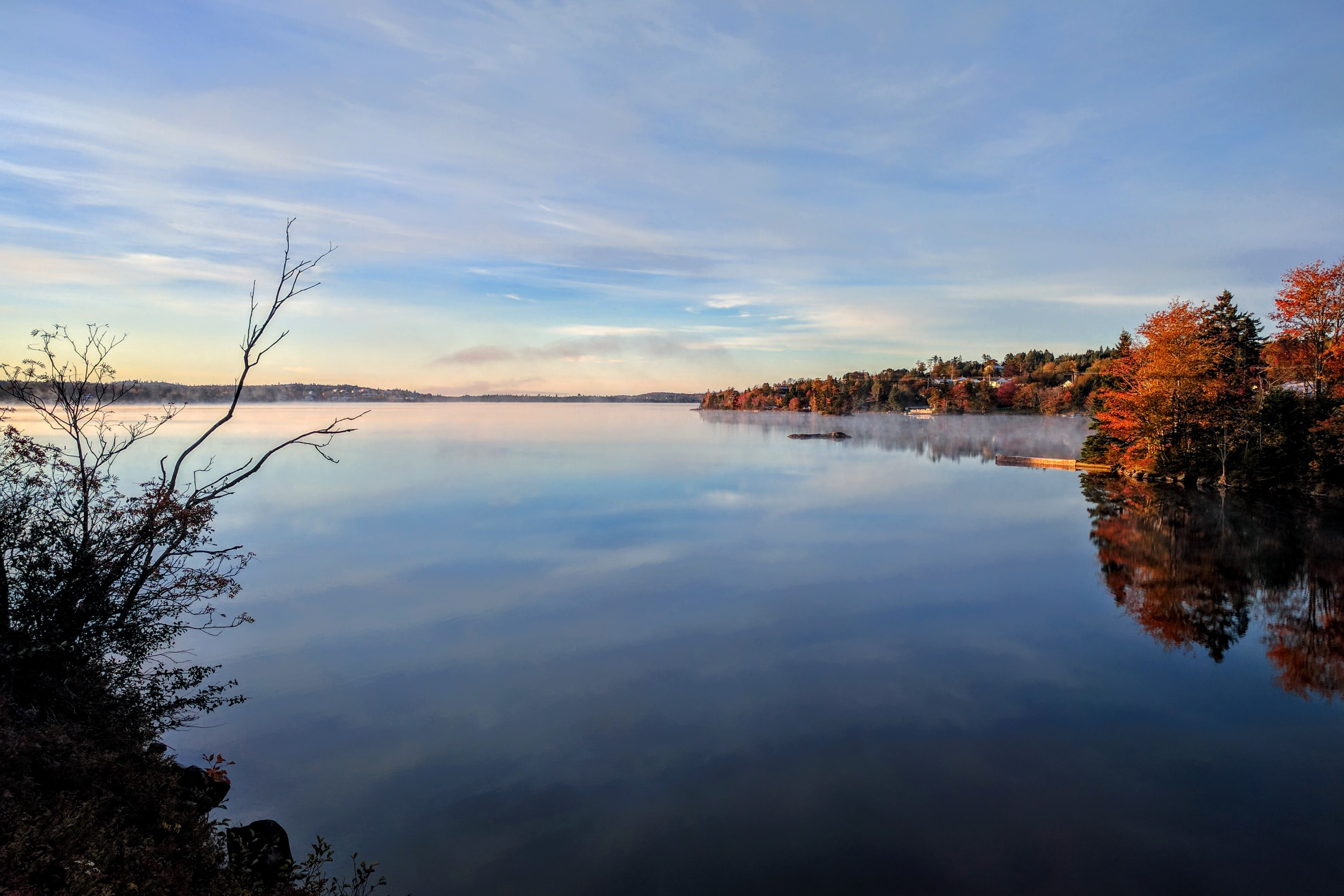
- Porters Lake in the Fall of 2016.

- Porter's Lake in Nova Scotia
- Location: Halifax County, Nova Scotia
- Coordinates: 44°43′40″N 63°18′00″W
- Type: Glacial Lake
- Primary inflows: East Brook, West Brook
- Primary outflows: Rocky Run
- Basin countries: Canada
- Max. length: 19 kilometres (12 mi)
- Max. width: 1 kilometre (0.62 mi)
- Surface area: N/A
- Max. depth: 30 metres (98 ft)
- Surface elevation: 0 m (0 ft)
- Islands: several small islands in the south part of the lake
- Settlements: Porters Lake, Nova Scotia

Porters Lake is a rural community in the Eastern Shore region of the Halifax Regional Municipality, Nova Scotia, Canada, between Trunk 7 and Route 207, 27.8 km from Halifax. The residents mainly commute to jobs in Dartmouth, Burnside Industrial Park, or Downtown Halifax. The community is built around the lake from which it takes its name.

== Lake ==
Porters Lake is 19 km long, but never more than 1 km and is in the shape of a crescent. The depth of Porters Lake varies significantly from the north end to the south end; the south end is approximately 5 m deep on average, but the north end averages around 12 m deep, with one part of the lake reaching 30 m depp. It is one of the most popular lakes for recreational boating in the region. The lake is connected to the Atlantic Ocean near Lawrencetown Beach and so its salinity varies from being almost completely fresh water at the north end to nearly that of ocean water at the south end.

The lake also features a man-made canal, which connects the lake to the Atlantic east of Rocky Run. The Department of Fisheries began construction in 1911 in the hope of creating a transportation corridor for raw materials that would take advantage of preexisting infrastructure for the local fisheries at Fisherman's Reserve in Seaforth, but construction was halted at the outbreak of World War I, and it was never developed for its intended purpose. It was built out only to 5 m at its widest and narrows as it nears the lake, but it is navigable by small crafts such as canoes.

In 2014, the Department of Fisheries still owned the land, and the federal government briefly had it up for sale as surplus land, as the construction of local highways and, for a time, the railroad made the project redundant. Nearly a century later, ownership was transferred to the Halifax Regional Municipality. Today, it is operated by the Atlantic View Trial Association.

The communities that surround Porters Lake include Porters Lake, Middle Porters Lake, West Porters Lake, East Lawrencetown, Three Fathom Harbour, and Seaforth. Crowell Road and West Porters Lake Road run along the west side of the lake. Porters Lake Provincial Park is located off West Porter's Lake Road, along the west side of the lake. .

Highway 107 crosses over the lake, and Highway 7 runs north of the lake. Highway 207 runs south of the lake until just past Three Fathom Harbour, where there is limited access to the lake by road on the east side as the highway and the residential communities run along the Atlantic coast.

== 2008 fire ==
On June 13, 2008, a forest fire broke out. It destroyed two houses, damaged more than 20 others, and burned almost 4,800 acres. More than 5,000 residents were evacuated from their homes, and several major roads were closed for three days. The fire was believed to have been caused by a camp fire though the Royal Canadian Mounted Police laid no charges. It was determined that residue from Hurricane Juan fueled the fire, which was the largest fire in an urban area of Nova Scotia and the largest fire overall in 30 years.

== This Street, That Street, and The Other Street ==
This Street, That Street, and The Other Street are three streets located in Porters Lake. The trio of streets became an Internet meme during the late 2010s because of their unusual names. They were first discussed in a 2013 Huffington Post article, which then shared in a list of the 41 weirdest street names in the United States posted on Mental Floss. Narcity also included them in a 2019 list of the 9 most unusual street names in Canada.

== Demographics ==
- Total population: 3217
- Total dwellings: 1286
- Total land area: 91.573 km^{2}

== See also ==
- Porters Lake Airport
- Porters Lake Water Aerodrome
