= Bedford Bypass =

Highway in Nova Scotia, Canada

Route information
- Maintained by Department of Transportation and Infrastructure Renewal
- Length: 4.72 km (2.93 mi)
- Existed: 1977–present
- Component highways: Trunk 33

Major junctions
- West end: Hwy 101 / Trunk 1 in Lower Sackville
- East end: Trunk 7 in Bedford

Location
- Country: Canada
- Province: Nova Scotia
- Municipalities: Halifax Regional Municipality

Highway system
- Provincial highways in Nova Scotia; 100-series
| ← Trunk 32 | → Hwy 101 |

The Bedford Bypass, internally designated as Trunk 33, is a highway in the Canadian province of Nova Scotia.

The Bedford Bypass is a 4.7-kilometre-long (2.9 mi) four-lane highway connecting Windmill Road (Trunk 7) in Dartmouth to Exit 1 of Highway 101 in the Lower Sackville area of the Halifax Regional Municipality.

The highway is not visibly assigned with a route number; however, it is assigned Trunk 33 by the provincial transportation department as an unsigned highway. Many maps incorrectly show it as an eastern continuation of Highway 101.

The road was built in 1977 to connect the eastern end of Highway 101 and to accommodate nearby truck (mainly B-Train) traffic from the nearby Burnside Industrial Park, relieving traffic from the center of the former town of Bedford and the steep hill entering the town. The posted speed limit is 90 km/h (55 mph).

== Exit list ==
The entire route is located in Halifax Regional Municipality. All exits are unnumbered.

| Location | km | mi | Destinations | Notes |
|---|---|---|---|---|
| Lower Sackville | 0.0– 1.1 | 0.0– 0.68 | Hwy 101 west – Windsor, Annapolis Valley | Westbound exit, eastbound entrance; Hwy 101 exit 1F |
| Lower Sackville | 0.0– 1.1 | 0.0– 0.68 | Trunk 1 west / Cobequid Road – Lower Sackville | Westbound exit and eastbound entrance |
| Bedford | 4.7 | 2.9 | Trunk 7 east (Windmill Road) – Dartmouth | Eastbound exit and westbound entrance |
1.000 mi = 1.609 km; 1.000 km = 0.621 mi: Incomplete access
