= Shearwater, Nova Scotia =

Shearwater
- Neighbourhood
- Location within Nova Scotia
- Country: Canada
- Province: Nova Scotia
- Municipality: Halifax Regional Municipality
- Community council: Harbour East - Marine Drive Community Council

Area
  - Total: 9.84 km^{2} (3.80 sq mi)
- Postal code: B3A
- Area code: 782, 902
- GNBC code: CBMLN

Shearwater is an unincorporated Nova Scotia suburban community in the Halifax Regional Municipality between Woodside and Eastern Passage occupied by Shearwater heliport. Shearwater is divided into two sections by Main Road, referred to locally as the Upper and Lower Base but part of the same complex. The Upper Base, on the east side of Main Road, houses the airfield and administrative buildings of 12 Wing Shearwater as well as a skate park, pool, gym, and youth centre. The Lower Base, a thin strip between Main Road and Eastern Passage, holds some maintenance buildings, the Atlantic fleet diving unit, training facilities, and a yacht club. Both Bases contain PMQ military housing.

The Shearwater Flyer Trail also begins here. It is a section of the Trans Canada Trail. It is maintained by Cole Harbour Parks & Trails. It was an abandoned railbed, but once it was decommissioned, it was transformed into a recreational trail. You could access it from Corsair Drive, Hines Road, Caldwell Road and Bissett Road.

== Geography ==
Shearwater is approximately 9.84 km^{2} (3.80 sq mi) in land area.

== Climate ==
Climate data for Shearwater Heliport, 1991–2020 normals, extremes 1944–present
Month	Jan	Feb	Mar	Apr	May	Jun	Jul	Aug	Sep	Oct	Nov	Dec	Year
Record high °C (°F)	14.3 (57.7)	16.2 (61.2)	28.3 (82.9)	27.8 (82.0)	32.0 (89.6)	33.9 (93.0)	33.3 (91.9)	33.2 (91.8)	34.3 (93.7)	28.5 (83.3)	22.2 (72.0)	15.6 (60.1)	34.3 (93.7)
Mean daily maximum °C (°F)	0.2 (32.4)	0.6 (33.1)	3.7 (38.7)	8.6 (47.5)	14.0 (57.2)	18.9 (66.0)	22.7 (72.9)	23.3 (73.9)	20.1 (68.2)	14.2 (57.6)	8.6 (47.5)	3.6 (38.5)	11.6 (52.9)
Daily mean °C (°F)	−4.1 (24.6)	−3.7 (25.3)	−0.3 (31.5)	4.5 (40.1)	9.5 (49.1)	14.4 (57.9)	18.5 (65.3)	19.1 (66.4)	15.8 (60.4)	10.2 (50.4)	5.0 (41.0)	−0.2 (31.6)	7.4 (45.3)
Mean daily minimum °C (°F)	−8.3 (17.1)	−7.9 (17.8)	−4.3 (24.3)	0.4 (32.7)	5.0 (41.0)	9.9 (49.8)	14.3 (57.7)	14.7 (58.5)	11.3 (52.3)	6.2 (43.2)	1.3 (34.3)	−3.9 (25.0)	3.2 (37.8)
Record low °C (°F)	−26.5 (−15.7)	−25.7 (−14.3)	−22.2 (−8.0)	−12.2 (10.0)	−3.3 (26.1)	0.0 (32.0)	6.7 (44.1)	5.6 (42.1)	−0.5 (31.1)	−5.6 (21.9)	−11.4 (11.5)	−23.5 (−10.3)	−26.5 (−15.7)
Average precipitation mm (inches)	123.8 (4.87)	114.0 (4.49)	119.5 (4.70)	107.6 (4.24)	114.8 (4.52)	107.3 (4.22)	95.3 (3.75)	94.1 (3.70)	106.5 (4.19)	141.0 (5.55)	134.6 (5.30)	155.8 (6.13)	1,414.2 (55.68)
Average snowfall cm (inches)	50.5 (19.9)	40.7 (16.0)	31.1 (12.2)	11.9 (4.7)	1.7 (0.7)	0.0 (0.0)	0.0 (0.0)	0.0 (0.0)	0.0 (0.0)	0.2 (0.1)	10.4 (4.1)	35.2 (13.9)	181.6 (71.5)
Average precipitation days (≥ 0.2 mm)	16.8	14.7	14.2	14.8	15.4	14.1	12.4	11.5	11.2	13.6	15.2	17.1	171.1
Average snowy days (≥ 0.2 cm)	11.3	10.0	8.0	3.7	0.5	0.0	0.0	0.0	0.0	0.2	2.6	8.5	44.8
Average relative humidity (%) (at 15:00 LST)	72.7	69.3	65.9	65.3	67.3	68.7	70.9	67.7	66.6	66.7	71.1	74.1	68.9
Mean monthly sunshine hours	109.5	127.2	142.8	156.6	193.3	220.7	235.2	226.6	180.5	157.8	107.4	105.2	1,962.5
Percentage possible sunshine	38.2	43.3	38.7	38.8	42.1	47.5	49.9	52.1	47.9	46.2	37.2	38.2	43.3
Source: Environment Canada (snow, sun 1981–2010)

== Shearwater Airforce Base ==
The Shearwater Airforce base is home to the 12 Wing of the Royal Canadian Airforce. It has a history of supporting naval operations due to its proximity to Halifax Harbour. The base currently operates combat ready CH-148 Cyclones in conjunction with the Royal Canadian Navy. In the Second World War, it served as a home to flying boats which conducted marine operations. Training operations were always a part of the base's history, and a target range in Grand Desert was created to support these operations.
