= Grand Desert, Nova Scotia =

Coordinates: 44°41′2.5″N 63°15′46″W

Grand Désert in Nova Scotia

Grand Désert is a small Acadian community of the Halifax Regional Municipality in the Canadian province of Nova Scotia on Route 207 situated between West Chezzetcook and Seaforth. It is one of the five villages located along the Chezzetcook Inlet. The name of the community came from the Acadian word Désert meaning "land of no trees". The population in 2003 was 315.

== History ==
Ancestors of the native Mi'kmaq lived along these shores for thousands of years prior to the arrival of the Europeans.

It is known that Vikings traveled in this part of the world in the year 1000 and that Portuguese, French and Basque fishermen were frequenting these shores in search of the plentiful cod in the late 15th century and early 16th century. In 1524 Giovanni da Verrazzano explored the coastline from Cape Breton to Florida for King Francis I of France and Jacques Cartier followed in 1534–36. In 1604 Henry IV granted a monopoly on these lands to Pierre Dugua, Sieur de Mons and the entire area was known as La Cadie or L'Acadie.

It has been suggested that Acadians were living in this area as early as 1740 and by the 1750s the Chezzetcook Inlet was home to 10 Acadian families. It is also known that by the beginning of the 1770s, there were 12 Acadian families who had made their way here.

The loyalty of all Acadians was a concern for the British in the 1750s, as they concentrated their efforts to establish a presence on the Atlantic seaboard. In the fall of 1755, the deportation (also referred to as the Great Expulsion) of the Acadians was authorized and carried out by the British under the command of Lieutenant-Governor Charles Lawrence. Many Acadians were deported and their valuable cultivated lands, houses and livestock were seized. Some, between 1758 and 1762, were brought to Halifax as prisoners. Those not deported were allowed to resettle in the province.

A few made their way to Chezzetcook Inlet and their names are reflected in the population of Grand Désert today: LaPierre, Bellefontaine and Wolfe. Other Acadian families trace their roots to the Cape Breton Acadians who were granted permission to settle in the Chezzetcook area. The family names represented in this group are: Petipas, Roma, Bonin (Bonang), Manet, and Mayet. The Breau and Bonnevie families came from the island of Miquelon and the Julien family descends from a soldier of the Napoleonic Wars. With the signing of the Treaty of Paris (1763), the Acadian population was allowed to live in peace in Nova Scotia. Many deported Acadians were granted permission to return to Nova Scotia and their number slowly grew. There were 47 families on the Chezzetcook Inlet by 1815.

=== Grand Desert Beach – Cold War Era Bombing Grounds ===
From 1951 to 1983, the Canadian Armed Forces used the southern-most portion of Grand Desert beach – a now eroded land mass known as Cape Antrim – as an air-to-surface target practice site known as the Chezzetcook Air Weapons Range.

The Department of National Defense expropriated the land for use until it was leased officially from the Halifax Regional Municipality in 1962. At the outset, the ordnance used at the range were surplus munitions left over from WWII. Bombing targets ranged from rings made with beach stones to brightly painted decommissioned tanks. Target runs were flown in a seaward direction so that ricocheting ordnance would deflect into the ocean, rather than onto the land.

In 1984, the DND declared the Chezzetcook Air Weapons Range surplus to its requirements and made plans to return it to HRM pending a Range Clearance Certificate.

The DnD sends members of the Canadian Armed Forces to clear ordnance as it is unearthed – in 1995, a decade after the closure of the range, 10 tonnes of ordnance were removed in that year alone. In August 2020, CAF personnel again surveyed the land to check for any possible Unexploded Explosive Ordnance (UXO) or scrap. As of 2021 the land is still banked by the DND as it has not yet been fully cleared.
