= Cherry Brook, Nova Scotia =

Community in Nova Scotia, Canada

Coordinates: 44°42′27.75″N 63°29′14.13″W

Cherry Brook in Nova Scotia

Cherry Brook rural community located to the north of Trunk 7 between Lake Loon and Lake Major, and just a few kilometres east of Dartmouth, Nova Scotia. It has a significant African Nova Scotian population.

Cherry Brook is a rural community with a few small farms. Most of the people work at trades in the Halifax Regional Municipality communities of Dartmouth and Halifax. The Baptist Church is the glue that keeps residents together. On Trunk 7 is located the Black Cultural Centre which contains meeting rooms and facilities to meet community needs for meetings and other events. It is a showplace for historical documents and other collections that tell the story of the early development of the Prestons and the many Black families who live in Black communities throughout Nova Scotia. In 1970 the community had an almost exclusively Black population of 700, though it is much smaller today.

Cherry Brook is also the home of Canadian Idol season one runner up, Gary Beals.
