= Hope for Wildlife =

Canadian non-profit organization

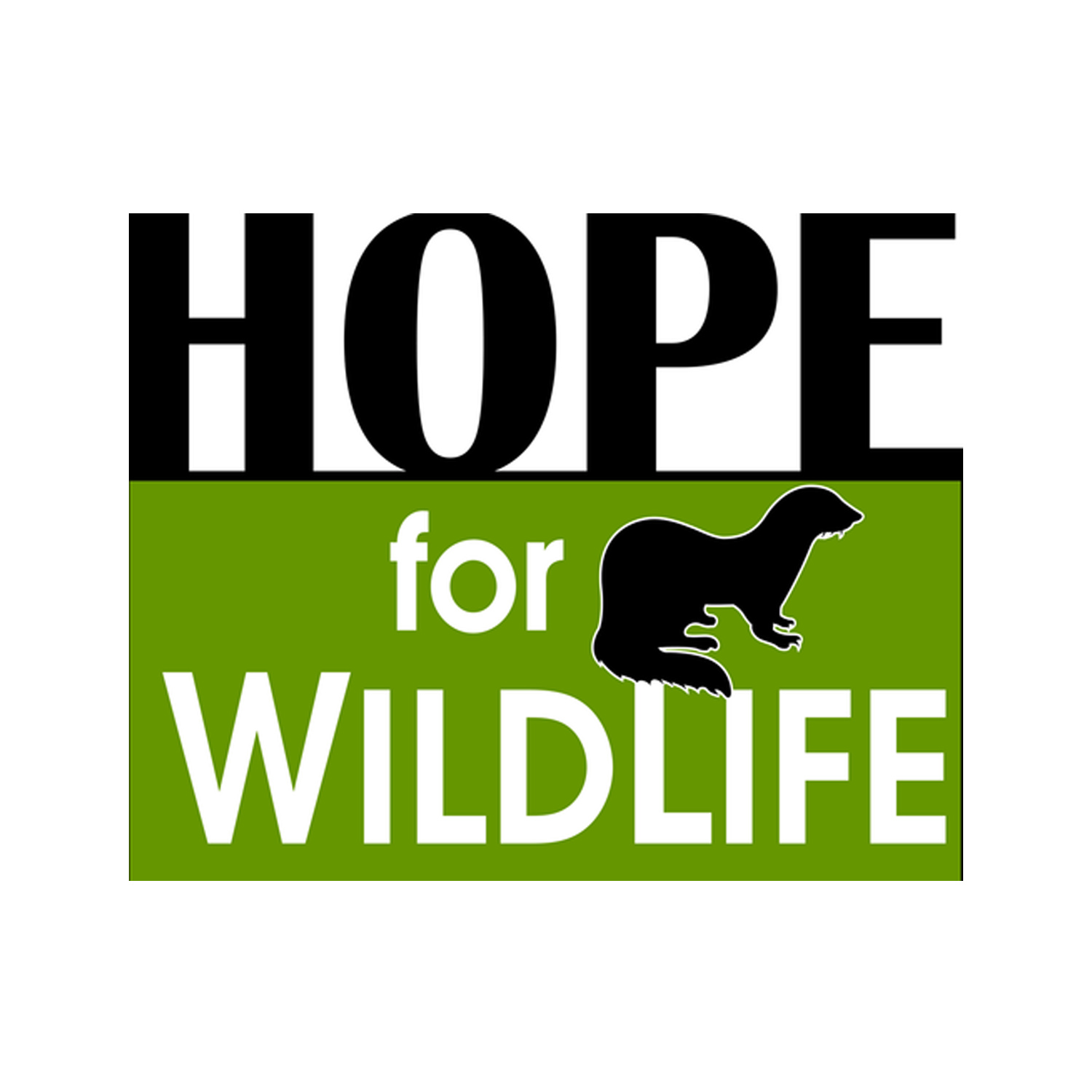
- Founder: Hope Swinimer
- Founded at: Seaforth, Nova Scotia, Canada
- Official language: English
- Owner: Hope Swinimer
- Website: www.hopeforwildlife.net

Hope for Wildlife (HFW) is a non-profit wildlife rehabilitation and education centre located on a farm in Seaforth, Nova Scotia, Canada. It was founded by Hope Swinimer in 1997 as The Eastern Shore Wildlife Rehabilitation and Rescue Centre. It got its current name in 2006. A television series, Hope for Wildlife, began documenting the centre's efforts in 2009.

The centre is dedicated to providing care to injured and orphaned animals before releasing them back into the wild. It also seeks to connect people to wildlife in a positive way through education for a sustainable future. As of 2024, the center has helped over 95,000 animals return to their wild habitat, representing over 300 species. The money for the farm comes almost entirely from public donations. Larger fundraising can come from events like the annual open house where people tour the farm, government grants for summer employees, and income from the TV show.

== History ==
While working at Dartmouth Veterinary Hospital in 1995, Hope Swinimer received as a patient a robin that had been attacked by a cat. While taking care of the bird, she developed an eagerness to learn more about taking care of injured wildlife. Her passion quickly led her to start doing wildlife rehabilitation as a full-time career, turning her home into a makeshift rehabilitation centre, starting with a few cages in the backyard and using her spare room as a nursery. In 1996, the Department of Natural Resources (DNR) required Hope to obtain a wildlife rehabilitation permit for her makeshift wildlife centre even though such a permit did not exist in Nova Scotia at the time. Hope worked with DNR to establish a licensing process that allowed for wildlife rehabilitation in the province. In 1997, she received her rehabilitation permit, and moved to Winnie's Way in Seaforth, Nova Scotia. Here she established the Eastern Shore Wildlife Rescue and Rehabilitation Centre. The centre became the first fully private wildlife rescue facility in Nova Scotia. After just a few years, the demands for the centre's help outgrew the property and in 2001 Hope moved again. Staying in Seaforth, Hope moved to a nearby farm property which allowed for expansion to her growing enterprise. Five years after this move, in 2006 the Eastern Shore Wildlife Rescue and Rehabilitation Centre officially became known as Hope for Wildlife, a registered charitable organization.

In 2012, the primary worker at HFW for eight years, and then manager, Allison Dube, left and moved to Scotland. As of 2015, the centre had helped over 15,000 animals from over 250 species. In 2018, a major member of HFW, Hope's husband Reid Steward Patterson, died from drowning in a boat accident.

As a part of furthering its mission, the centre has set up satellite triage centres around the province of Nova Scotia.

In 2023, a 24/7 drop-off clinic was established for Cape Breton, located at the northern shore of the mainland.

As of 2024, there are 3 satellite clinics.

As of 2026, the centre had helped over 95,000 animals from over 300 species. Black Bear cubs are added to the list of animals rehabilitated as of 2026, with an off site bear shelter in Cape Breton.

== Mission statement ==
The organization has put forth a mission statement to outline what it wishes to achieve. It lists three main goals:

1. Rescue, rehabilitate and reintroduce to the wild injured and orphaned wildlife.
2. Educate others about the importance of conserving wild animals and the ecosystems that sustain them.
3. Research and develop the knowledge and understanding necessary for the conservation and management of wildlife.

== Progress ==
Since 1997, the facility has grown considerably, starting with development of the education centre which allowed for people to visit the facility and learn about wildlife and what the organization does. The education centre itself grew and now consists of one building, an outdoor pavilion and wildlife gardens. Hope for Wildlife became the first group in the province to legally rehabilitate and release white tailed deer and birds of prey, developing a 100-foot-long flight cage for large birds, and a deer enclosure (which consists of over an acre of field and a small barn designed for raising orphaned white tailed deer). The facility hit a milestone when they opened the first wildlife veterinary hospital in the province back in 2012. The next big projects consisted of building a marine unit, for the growing number of injured seal pups and sea birds. Following the marine unit, a large mammal unit was constructed at the back of the property for the larger predator mammals, such as bobcats. On average, the centre sees about 3,500 animals a year, continuing to take in more animals each year. These animals may have been injured, orphaned or lost. Animals the centre has worked with include fox, deer, raccoons, skunks and beavers.

As of 2024, there are 3 satellite clinics, the South Shore clinic, Cape Breton clinic, Annapolis Valley clinic.

The centre receives approximately 40,000 callers a year to its wildlife helpline, which is put in place for anyone who comes into contact with a wild animal in need of assistance.

== Funding ==
The organization gets most of its funding from small donations given by the public, both those who visit the centre and those who call the helpline. The majority of donations are around $10 and pay for about $95,000 of necessities such as feed, cleaning supplies, and building upkeep.

Larger donations come from events like the annual open house that the centre hosts, gift shop proceeds, government grants set forth for summer employees and any money coming from a TV series. Simply named Hope for Wildlife, the program follows many of the organization's stories.

== Television series ==
Hope for Wildlife
- Based on: Hope for Wildlife
- Starring: Hope Swinimer
- Country of origin: Canada
- Original language: English
- No. of seasons: 10
- No. of episodes: 137

Production
- Production locations: Seaforth, Nova Scotia
- Running time: 52 min (1 hour timeslot)
- Production company: Arcadia Content

Original release
- Release: January 16, 2011

Produced by Arcadia Content the documentary series, "Hope for Wildlife", follows the team as they nurse thousands of injured and orphaned wildlife back to health and return them to the wild. The stories of the animals and the team members that devote their lives to saving them are depicted in each episode. Filming of the first season began in 2009. Episodes are an hour long. Online episodes can be found on Arcadia Wild, Oasis HD, The Knowledge Network, and CottageLife. In the United States, 30-minute episodes known as Hope in the Wild air as part of the CBS Dream Team programming block.

The show also has additional coverage at Dr. Barry's practice. And the Metro Animal Emergency Clinic. It also had some additional coverage at Hope's city pound, Homeward Bound City Pound, that she operated from 2010 to 2020.

=== History ===
Filming on the series started in 2009. Season 1 premiered in the fall of 2010 on Oasis HD. Season 2 premiered in the spring of 2011 on Oasis HD.

Since 2018, the series is repackaged as another TV series, "Hope in the Wild". for the U.S. market, in half-hour episodes, as E/I-content. It premiered on Saturday 29 September 2018.

Episode 100 was aired on 1 February 2019, filmed in the 21st year of the centre's history (during summer 2018).

In 2019, a spin-off TV show, "Doctor Barry" focusing on veterinarian Barry MacEachern and the Burnside Veterinary Hospital premiered.

In 2025, the series relaunched as "Hope for Wildlife: The Next Generation", after a post-COVID19 pause, with a new season premiering on Cottage Life cable channel in March 2025.

=== Cast ===
Human

- Hope — founder
- Dr. Barry — veterinarian
- Allison — manager
- Rebecca — staff
- Nicole — staff
- Tiffany — Homeward Bound City Pound staff
- Sara — staff
- Zach — staff
- Erin — intern
- Dr. Krystal Woo — first live-in vet
- Julie — staff leader at Annapolis Valley Emergency Drop-off Centre of Hope for Wildlife
- Jessie — staffer at South Shore satellite clinic of Hope for Wildlife
- Melissa — live-in manager at the Cape Breton regional 24/7 drop-off clinic

Animal

- Shubie - Raven
- Gretel — resident pine marten
- Oliver — resident barred owl
- Maxwell — resident skunk
- Dan — pet peacock
- Scotty — resident pigeon

=== Seasons ===
Season	Episodes	Originally released	
Season	Episodes	First released	Last released
1	13	January 6, 2011	
2	13		
3	13		
4	13		
5	13		
6	13		
7	13		
8	26		
9	10		
10	10	April 24, 2020	June 26, 2020
11	8	March 4, 2025	TBA

== Hope TV ==
HOPE TV
- Screenshot
- Available in: English
- Owner: Hope for Wildlife
- Website: hopeforwildlife.tv

Hope TV is the online TV channel based around what happens at HFW. The site launched in the spring of 2017.
