= Gaetz Brook, Nova Scotia =

Human settlement in Nova Scotia, Canada

Coordinates: 44°46′9.9″N 63°12′34″W

Gaetz Brook in Nova Scotia

Gaetz Brook is a rural community of the Halifax Regional Municipality in the Canadian province of Nova Scotia. Gaetz Brook once had a junior high school called Gaetz Brook Junior High for students in grades 7–9, and the students came from O'Connell Drive Elementary and Porter's Lake Elementary. They could also come from Atlantic view Elementary.

== Gaetz Brook Greenway ==
In spring 2020, SATA Trails opened the Gaetz Brook Greenway. The newly developed rail trail starts in Musquodoboit Harbour near the end of Highway 107 and ends on the East Chezzetcook Road. There are small connectors to the trail through the parking lot of the Gaetz Brook Junior High School, the parking lot of the Eastern Marine Legion 161 and Pine Hill Drive.
