= Lake Major, Nova Scotia =

Lake Major
- Lake Major in Nova Scotia
- Location: Halifax Regional Municipality, Nova Scotia
- Coordinates: 44°43′4″N 63°28′2″W
- Type: Glacial Lake
- Basin countries: Canada
- Max. length: 8 km (5.0 mi)
- Max. width: ~1.5 km (0.93 mi)
- Max. depth: 60 m (200 ft)
- Surface elevation: 19 m (62 ft)
- Islands: None

Lake Major is a rural community of the Halifax Regional Municipality in the Canadian province of Nova Scotia.

== The lake ==
Lake Major is among the deepest lakes in Nova Scotia, with a maximum depth of 60 m. It serves as the water supply for the former City of Dartmouth; as a result, there is a water pumphouse on the southeast side of the lake.
