= Seaforth, Nova Scotia =

Community in Nova Scotia, Canada

Coordinates: 44°39′57.26″N 63°15′29.69″W

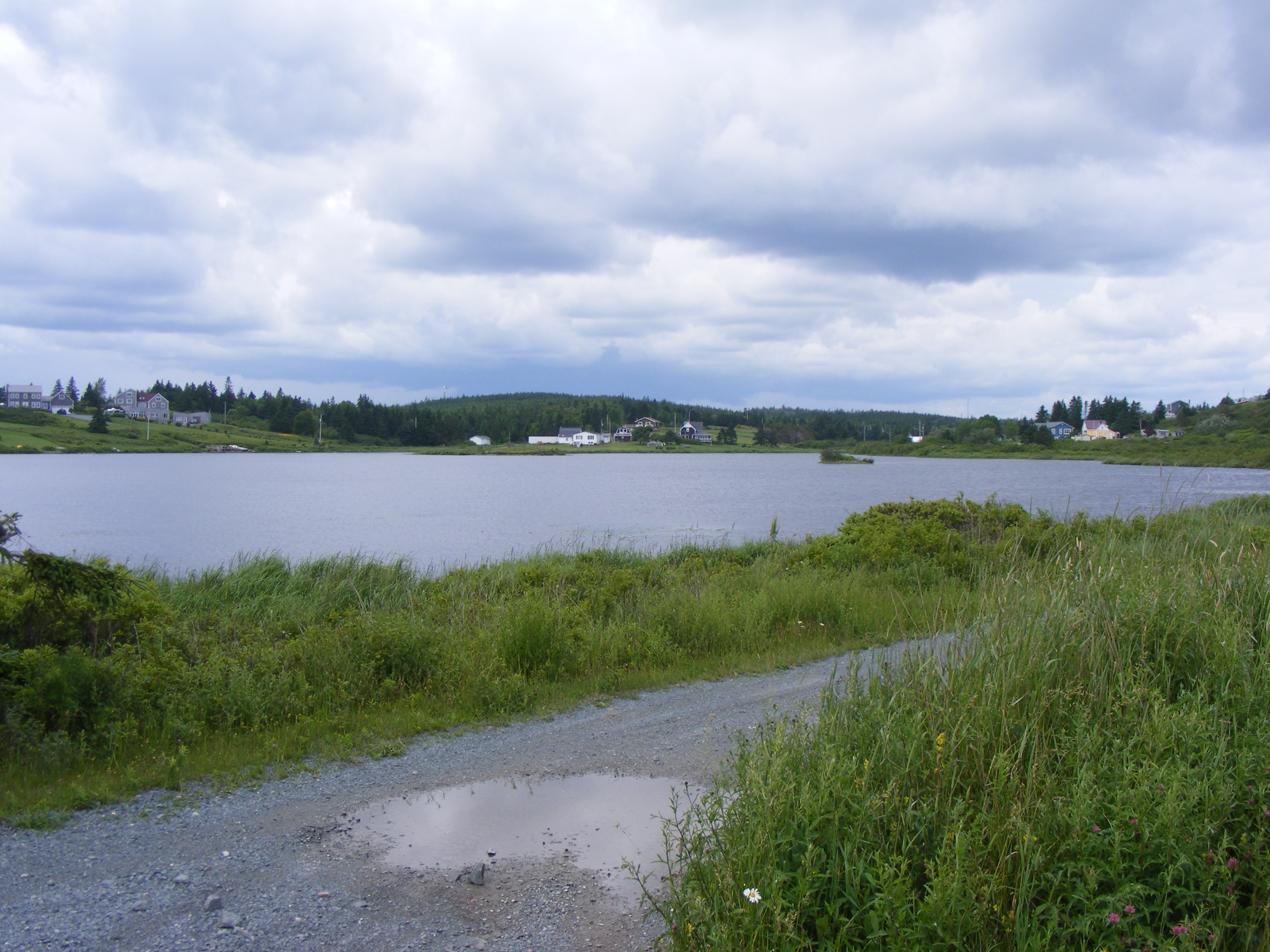
Gaetz Lake in Seaforth, July 2023.

Seaforth in Nova Scotia

Seaforth is a community of the Halifax Regional Municipality in the Canadian province of Nova Scotia. Seaforth is home to the Hope For Wildlife Society, an organisation dedicated to helping injured wild animals. The community was named for Seaforth, Merseyside, in England.
