= East Chezzetcook, Nova Scotia =

Rural community in Nova Scotia, Canada

Coordinates: 44°43′08″N 63°13′47″W

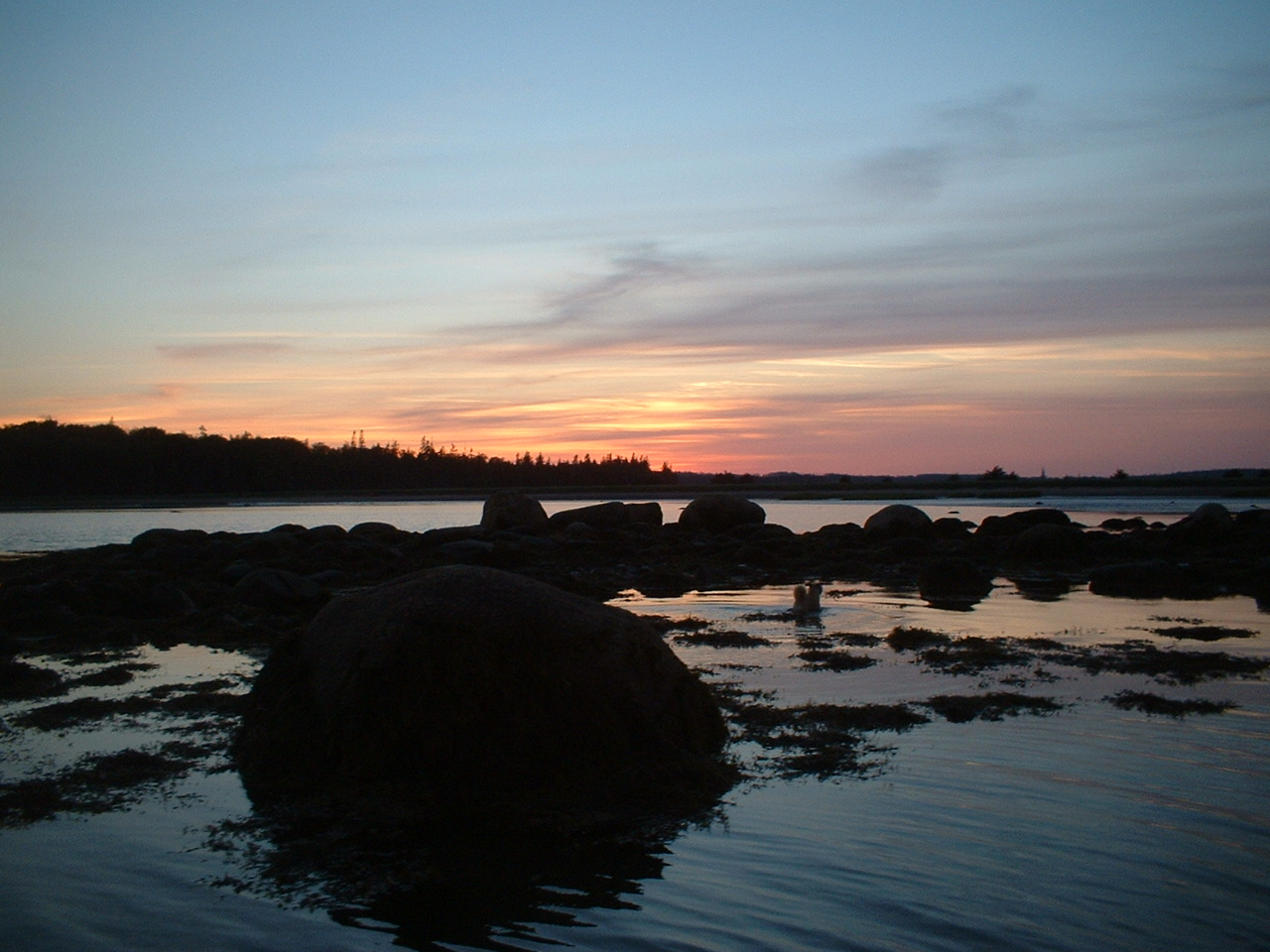
Island in East Chezzetcook inlet

East Chezzetcook in Nova Scotia

East Chezzetcook (English: /ˈtʃɛzəkʊk/) is a rural community on the Eastern Shore outside of the Halifax Regional Municipality, Nova Scotia, on the East Chezzetcook Road off of Trunk 7. This small French fishing village is home to many descendant Acadians.

== Parks and Recreation ==
The Long Beach Provincial Park and Conrod's Beach is located in this community. Conrod's Beach is not maintained by any government or person. The Nathan Smith Park is also located here. In spring 2020, the Gaetz Brook Greenway opened, beginning in East Chezzetcook. The rail trail was completed by SATA Trails. The trail ends in Musquodoboit Harbour and can be accessed by the Eastern Marine Legion 161, Gaetz Brook Junior High School, Pine Hill Drive and Stat Hill Road.

== Communications ==
- The postal code is B0J 1N0
- The telephone exchange is 902 827 -Aliant
