= Upper Lawrencetown, Nova Scotia =

Coordinates: 44°41′10″N 63°25′38″W

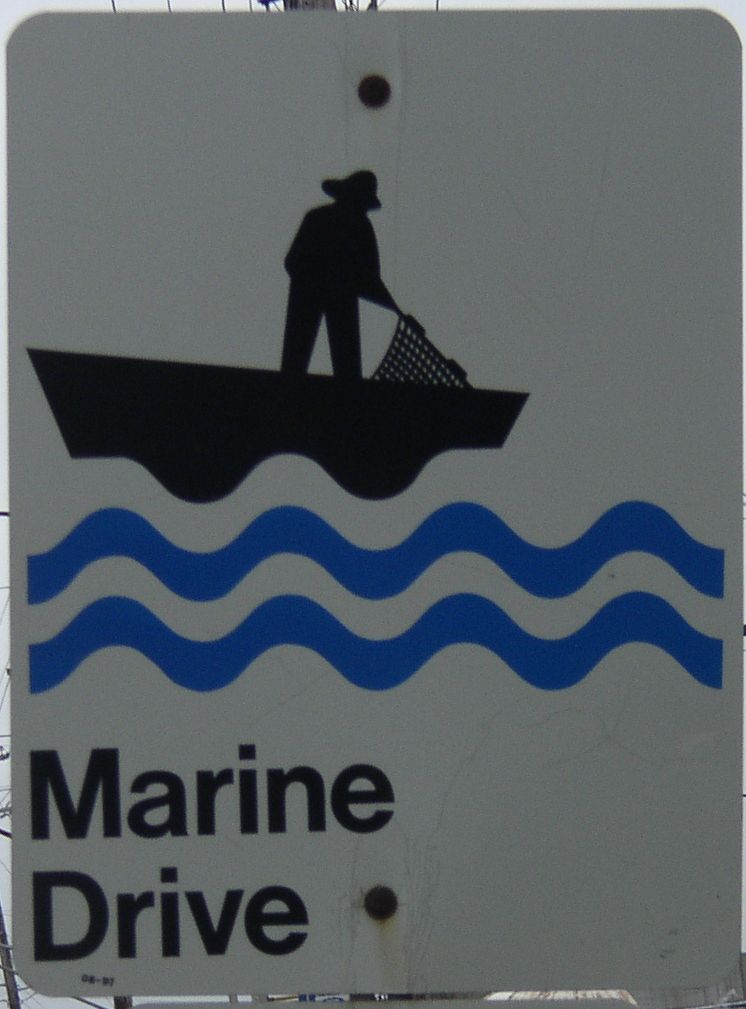
On Marine Drive

Upper Lawrencetown in Nova Scotia

Upper Lawrencetown is a Canadian rural community in Nova Scotia, Canada within the Halifax Regional Municipality.

It is located on the Eastern Shore along Route 207, also known as the Marine Drive.

== Schools ==
- Atlantic View Elementary School (Primary to Grade 6)
