= West Chezzetcook, Nova Scotia =

Coordinates: 44°43′4.9″N 63°15′53.5″W

West Chezzetcook in Nova Scotia

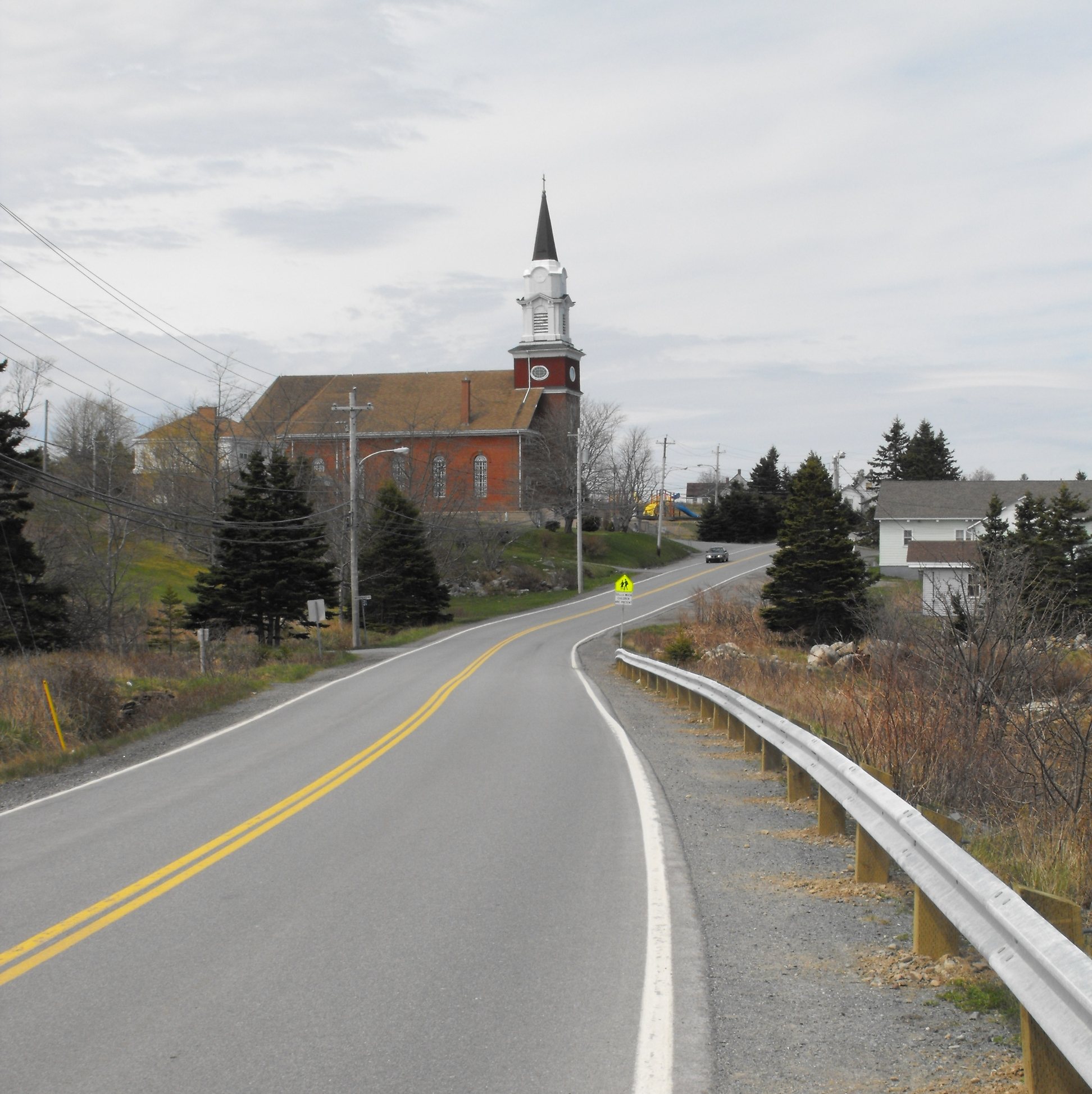
St. Anselm Church in West Chezzetcook

West Chezzetcook (English: /ˈtʃɛzəkʊk/) is an Acadian community of the Halifax Regional Municipality in the Canadian province of Nova Scotia on Route 207.

It is the site of the Acadian House Museum.

St. Anselm's Roman Catholic Church
A Roman Catholic church was established in the community in 1814. The present structure was completed in 1894.
