= East Lawrencetown, Nova Scotia =

Community in Nova Scotia, Canada

Coordinates: 44°38′43.2″N 63°21′3.6″W

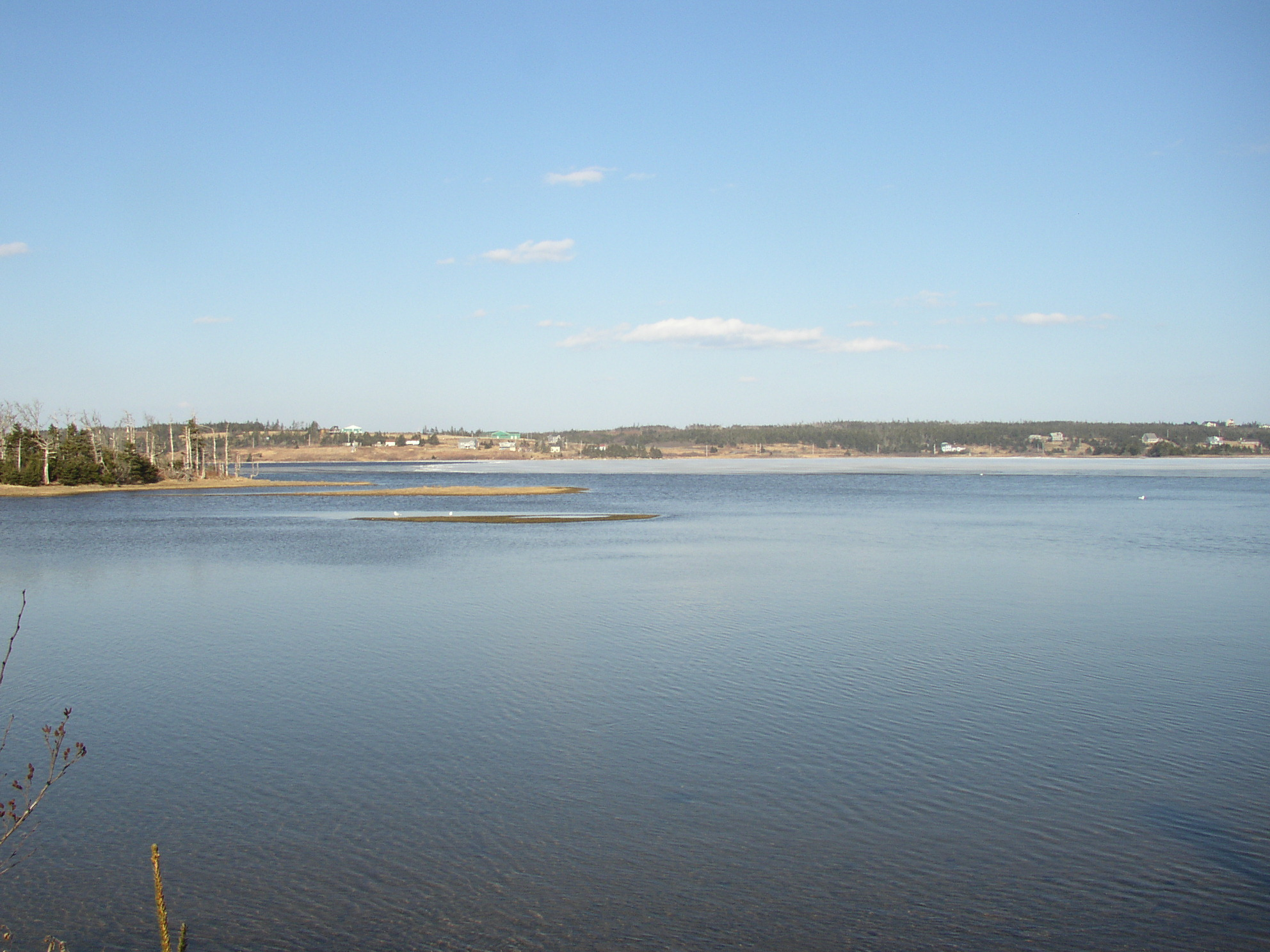
East Lawerencetown

East Lawerencetown in Nova Scotia

East Lawrencetown is an unincorporated community in the Canadian province of Nova Scotia, located in Halifax Regional Municipality. The community is 22.4 kilometers from Halifax. Lawrencetown Beach Provincial Park is located in the community, at the southern end of Lawrencetown Lake, a natural ocean inlet. The beach is a year-round destination for surfing, attracting both locals and those from abroad.

== Demographics ==
- Total population 251
- Total dwellings 83
- Total land area 20.5987 km^{2}
