= Lawrencetown, Halifax County, Nova Scotia =

Coordinates: 44°39′17.26″N 63°21′36.77″W

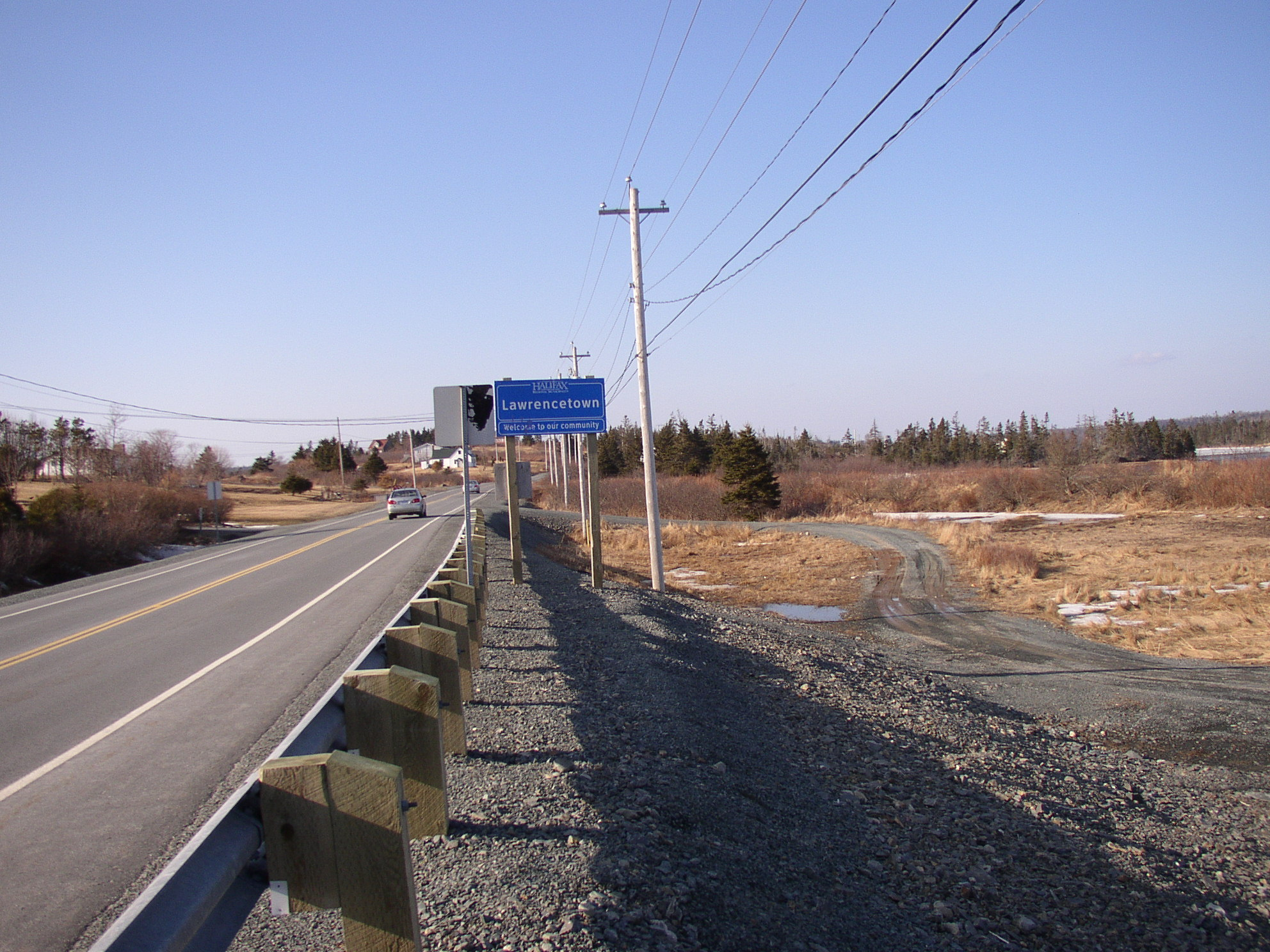

Lawrencetown (1986 population: 2,680) is a Canadian rural community in the Halifax Regional Municipality in Nova Scotia, Canada. The settlement was established during the eve of Father Le Loutre's War and at the beginning of the French and Indian War.

== History ==
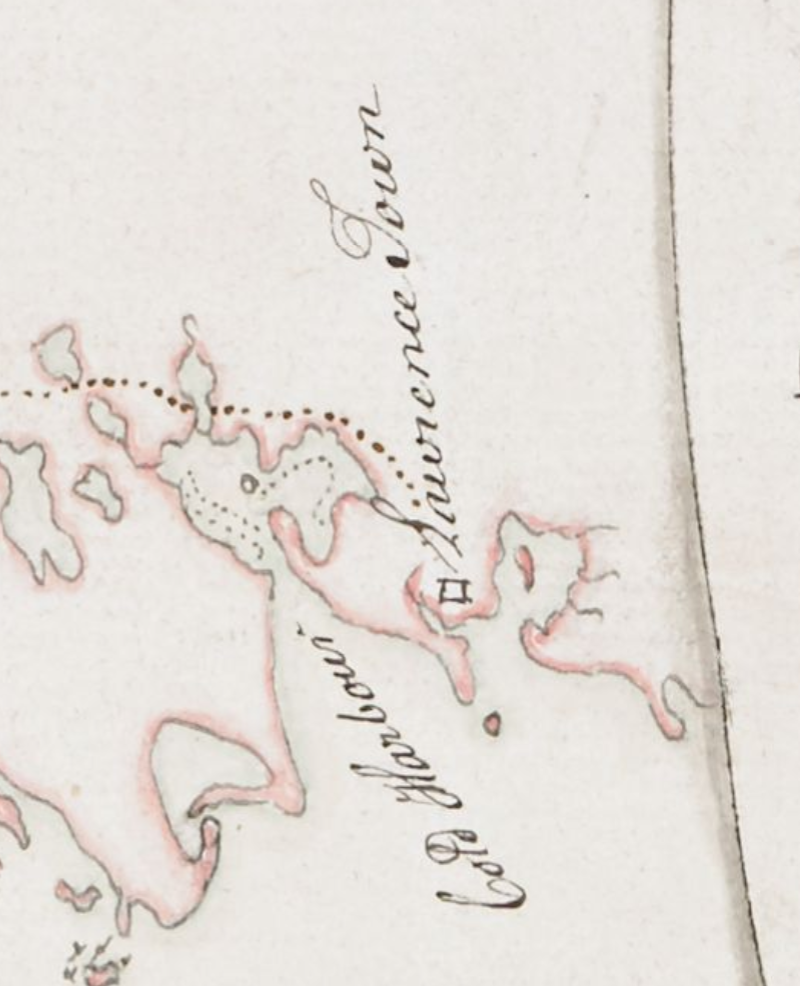
Lawrence Town blockhouse by John Brewse (inset of A map of the surveyed parts of Nova Scotia, 1756)

Father Le Loutre's War began when Edward Cornwallis arrived to establish Halifax with 13 transports on June 21, 1749. To guard against Mi'kmaq, Acadian and French attacks on the new Protestant settlements, British fortifications were erected in Halifax (1749), Bedford (Fort Sackville) (1749), Dartmouth (1750), Lunenburg (1753) and Lawrencetown (1754).

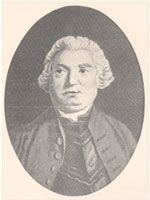
Charles Lawrence

In 1754, Nova Scotia's Lieutenant Governor Charles Lawrence, offered land grants to twenty families, who referred to their settlement as Lawrence's Town, which became Lawrencetown. The Acadians and natives resisted the British occupation of Nova Scotia and Acadia by raiding the various communities. In late April 1754, at the outbreak of the French and Indian War, Joseph Broussard and a large band of Mi'kmaq and Acadians left Chignecto for Lawrencetown. They arrived in mid-May and in the night opened fire on the village. Broussard killed and scalped four British settlers and two soldiers. By August, as the raids continued, the residents and soldiers were withdrawn to Halifax. By June 1757, the settlers had to be withdrawn completely again from the settlement of Lawrencetown because the number of Indian raids eventually prevented settlers from leaving their houses. (Throughout the war, the Mi'kmaq and Acadian militias were also successful in containing the British settlements of Dartmouth, Lunenburg as well as Fort Edward and Fort Sackville.)

It is located on the Eastern Shore, 8 kilometres due east of the entrance to Halifax Harbour.

The community name of Lawrencetown was adopted on October 4, 1921, but changed to 'East Lawrencetown' on July 3, 1952. It was reinstated as Lawrencetown on April 5, 1961.

Lawrencetown in Nova Scotia

== Notable residents ==
- Lesley Choyce, author, professor, and TV host.
- Captain Parker of the Welsford-Parker Monument
