= Dunbrack Street =

Road in Halifax, Nova Scotia, Canada

- North West Arm Drive

Route information
- Maintained by Department of Transportation and Infrastructure Renewal
- Length: 9.2 km (5.7 mi) Northwest Arm Drive 4.6 km (2.9 mi)
- Component highways: Trunk 32

Major junctions
- South end: Kearney Lake Road
- Main Avenue; Trunk 3 Hwy 102
- North end: Route 306

Location
- Country: Canada
- Province: Nova Scotia
- Municipalities: Halifax Regional Municipality

Highway system
- Provincial highways in Nova Scotia; 100-series
← Trunk 30	→ Trunk 33

Dunbrack Street is a 9.2 km (5.7 mi) arterial road in Mainland Halifax, Nova Scotia. It runs from Route 306 (Old Sambro Road) in Spryfield to Kearney Lake Road in Rockingham. Prior to 2019, Dunbrack Street ran from Kearney Lake Road in Rockingham to Main Avenue in Fairview. The remaining section was named Northwest Arm Drive. The former Northwest Arm section is assigned Trunk 32 by the provincial transportation department as an unsigned highway.

Dunbrack Street is named for Roy Dunbrack, who was a surveyor for the city of Halifax, Nova Scotia. The Halifax Dunbrack Soccer Club is named after the street.

== Northwest Arm Drive ==
The North West Arm Drive was a 4.6 km (2.9 mi) four-lane expressway in Halifax that ran from Main Avenue connecting Fairview to Route 306 (Old Sambro Road), connecting to Highway 102 and Trunk 3. The highway was a stub of the incomplete "Harbour Drive" project which would have connected Highway 102 with the Halifax waterfront, via a bridge over the Northwest Arm and a 6-lane highway through the south end along Water Street and along Barrington past Cogswell. The project was cancelled in the 1970s in the wake of public opposition, but not before North West Arm Drive and the Cogswell Street Interchange were completed. On April 29, 2019, the Halifax Regional Municipality renamed it to Dunbrack Street.

== History ==
Construction of North West Arm Drive by the provincial Department of Highways began in 1975/76. Work on the four-lane road, stretching from Dunbrack Street to the Old Sambro Road, was completed in 1977/78.

== Major intersections ==
The entire route is in Halifax.

km	mi	Exit	Destinations	Notes
0.0	0.0		Route 306 (Old Sambro Road) to Route 349 – Herring Cove, Sambro, Harrietsfield, Williamswood	Dunbrack Street (Northwest Arm Drive) / Trunk 32 southern terminus
0.4	0.25		Cowie Hill Road	
1.3	0.81		Bayview Road	
1.0	0.62		Peter Saulnier Drive	
1.6	0.99		Osborne Street	
2.3	1.4		Trunk 3 to Hwy 103 / Albert Walker Street / Walter Havill Drive – Peggys Cove, Timberlea, Armdale	Partially grade separated connection to Trunk 3
3.7	2.3	1K/H	Hwy 102 / Bayers Road – Downtown, Airport, Windsor, Truro	Signed as exit 1K (south) and 1H (north); Hwy 102 exit 1D
4.2	2.6		Washmill Lake Drive	
4.6	2.9		Main Avenue	Former northern terminus of Northwest Arm Drive; Trunk 32 northern terminus
5.1	3.2		Willett Street	
5.9	3.7		Lacewood Drive	
4.6	2.9		Radcliffe Drive / Lincoln Cross	
6.9	4.3		Langbrae Drive / Knightsbridge Drive	
7.3	4.5		Farnham Gate Road / Ruth Goldbloom Drive	
8.3	5.2		Kearney Lake Road to Bedford Highway (Trunk 2) / Donaldson Avenue	Dunbrack Street northern terminus; continues as Kearney Lake Road
9.2	5.7		Hwy 102 – Halifax, Bedford, Airport, Truro Kearney Lake Road	Kearney Lake Road continues north; Hwy 102 exit 2
1.000 mi = 1.609 km; 1.000 km = 0.621 mi: Closed/former; Route transition
