= List of former municipalities of Nova Scotia =

This is a list of former municipalities of Nova Scotia, the type of municipality, the new municipality, whether the merger was by amalgamation or dissolution or annexation, and the year they joined the new municipality, if known. Unincorporated areas that joined municipalities are mentioned as well, if known. Explanations on the basis of the amalgamations are given wherever possible.

Nova Scotia has undergone reforms to local government since the mid-1990s, which has seen various municipalities amalgamate to form larger municipalities or dissolve into surrounding municipalities.

Name	Municipal type	Part of	Amalgamation year	Merger type	Other
Cape Breton	County Municipality	Cape Breton Regional Municipality	1995	Amalgamation	enabling legislation An Act to Incorporate the Cape Breton Regional Municipality S.N.S. 1994
Sydney	City	Cape Breton Regional Municipality	1995	Amalgamation	enabling legislation An Act to Incorporate the Cape Breton Regional Municipality S.N.S. 1994
Glace Bay	Town	Cape Breton Regional Municipality	1995	Amalgamation	enabling legislation An Act to Incorporate the Cape Breton Regional Municipality S.N.S. 1994
Dominion	Town	Cape Breton Regional Municipality	1995	Amalgamation	enabling legislation An Act to Incorporate the Cape Breton Regional Municipality S.N.S. 1994
Louisbourg	Town	Cape Breton Regional Municipality	1995	Amalgamation	enabling legislation An Act to Incorporate the Cape Breton Regional Municipality S.N.S. 1994
New Waterford	Town	Cape Breton Regional Municipality	1995	Amalgamation	enabling legislation An Act to Incorporate the Cape Breton Regional Municipality S.N.S. 1994
North Sydney	Town	Cape Breton Regional Municipality	1995	Amalgamation	enabling legislation An Act to Incorporate the Cape Breton Regional Municipality S.N.S. 1994
Sydney Mines	Town	Cape Breton Regional Municipality	1995	Amalgamation	enabling legislation An Act to Incorporate the Cape Breton Regional Municipality S.N.S. 1994
Halifax	County Municipality	Halifax Regional Municipality	1996	Amalgamation	enabling legislation An Act to Incorporate the Halifax Regional Municipality S.N.S. 1995
Halifax	City	Halifax Regional Municipality	1996	Amalgamation	enabling legislation An Act to Incorporate the Halifax Regional Municipality S.N.S. 1995
Dartmouth	City	Halifax Regional Municipality	1996	Amalgamation	enabling legislation An Act to Incorporate the Halifax Regional Municipality S.N.S. 1995
Bedford	Town	Halifax Regional Municipality	1996	Amalgamation	enabling legislation An Act to Incorporate the Halifax Regional Municipality S.N.S. 1995
Queens	County Municipality	Region of Queens Municipality	1996	Amalgamation	enabling legislation An Act to Incorporate the Region of Queens Municipality S.N.S. 1995
Liverpool	Town	Region of Queens Municipality	1996	Amalgamation	enabling legislation An Act to Incorporate the Region of Queens Municipality S.N.S. 1995
Canso	Town	Municipality of the District of Guysborough	2012	Dissolution	enabling legislation Municipal Government Act S.N.S. 2012
Bridgetown	Town	Municipality of the County of Annapolis	2015	Dissolution	enabling legislation Municipal Government Act S.N.S. 2015
Springhill	Town	Municipality of the County of Cumberland	2015	Dissolution	enabling legislation Municipal Government Act S.N.S. 2015
Hantsport	Town	Municipality of the District of West Hants (now West Hants Regional Municipality)	2015	Dissolution	enabling legislation Municipal Government Act S.N.S. 2015
Parrsboro	Town	Municipality of the County of Cumberland	2016	Dissolution	enabling legislation Municipal Government Act S.N.S. 2016
West Hants	District municipality	West Hants Regional Municipality	2020	Amalgamation	
Windsor	Town	West Hants Regional Municipality	2020	Amalgamation	
Spryfield	Unincorporated area	City of Halifax	1969	Annexation	enabling legislation An Act Respecting Areas Annexed to the City of Halifax S.N.S. 1968
Armdale	Unincorporated area	City of Halifax	1969	Annexation	enabling legislation An Act Respecting Areas Annexed to the City of Halifax S.N.S. 1968
Rockingham	Unincorporated area	City of Halifax	1969	Annexation	enabling legislation An Act Respecting Areas Annexed to the City of Halifax S.N.S. 1968
Fairview	Unincorporated area	City of Halifax	1969	Annexation	enabling legislation An Act Respecting Areas Annexed to the City of Halifax S.N.S. 1968
Woodlawn	Unincorporated area	City of Dartmouth	1961	Annexation	enabling legislation An Act Relating to the City of Dartmouth S.N.S. 1961
Woodside	Unincorporated area	City of Dartmouth	1961	Annexation	enabling legislation An Act Relating to the City of Dartmouth S.N.S. 1961
Westphal	Unincorporated area	City of Dartmouth	1961	Annexation	enabling legislation An Act Relating to the City of Dartmouth S.N.S. 1961
Whitney Pier	Unincorporated area	City of Sydney	1904	Annexation	enabling legislation The Municipal Act S.N.S. 1904
