= Nova Scotia Route 253 =

Highway in Nova Scotia, Canada

Route 253

Route information
- Maintained by Nova Scotia Department of Transportation and Infrastructure Renewal
- Length: 12 km (7.5 mi)

Major junctions
- South end: Route 349 in Herring Cove
- North end: Route 349 in Armdale

Location
- Country: Canada
- Province: Nova Scotia

Highway system
- Provincial highways in Nova Scotia; 100-series
← Route 252	→ Route 255

Nova Scotia Route 253 is a collector road in the Canadian province of Nova Scotia.

It is located in the Halifax Regional Municipality and connects Armdale with Herring Cove. The route generally parallels the eastern coast of the Chebucto Peninsula.

Between the junction with Route 349 in Armdale and Fortress Drive in Ferguson's Cove, it is known as Purcell's Cove Road. Afterwards and until Village Road in Herring Cove, it is known as John Brackett Drive. The last stretch in Herring Cove is known as Hebridean Drive.

== Communities ==
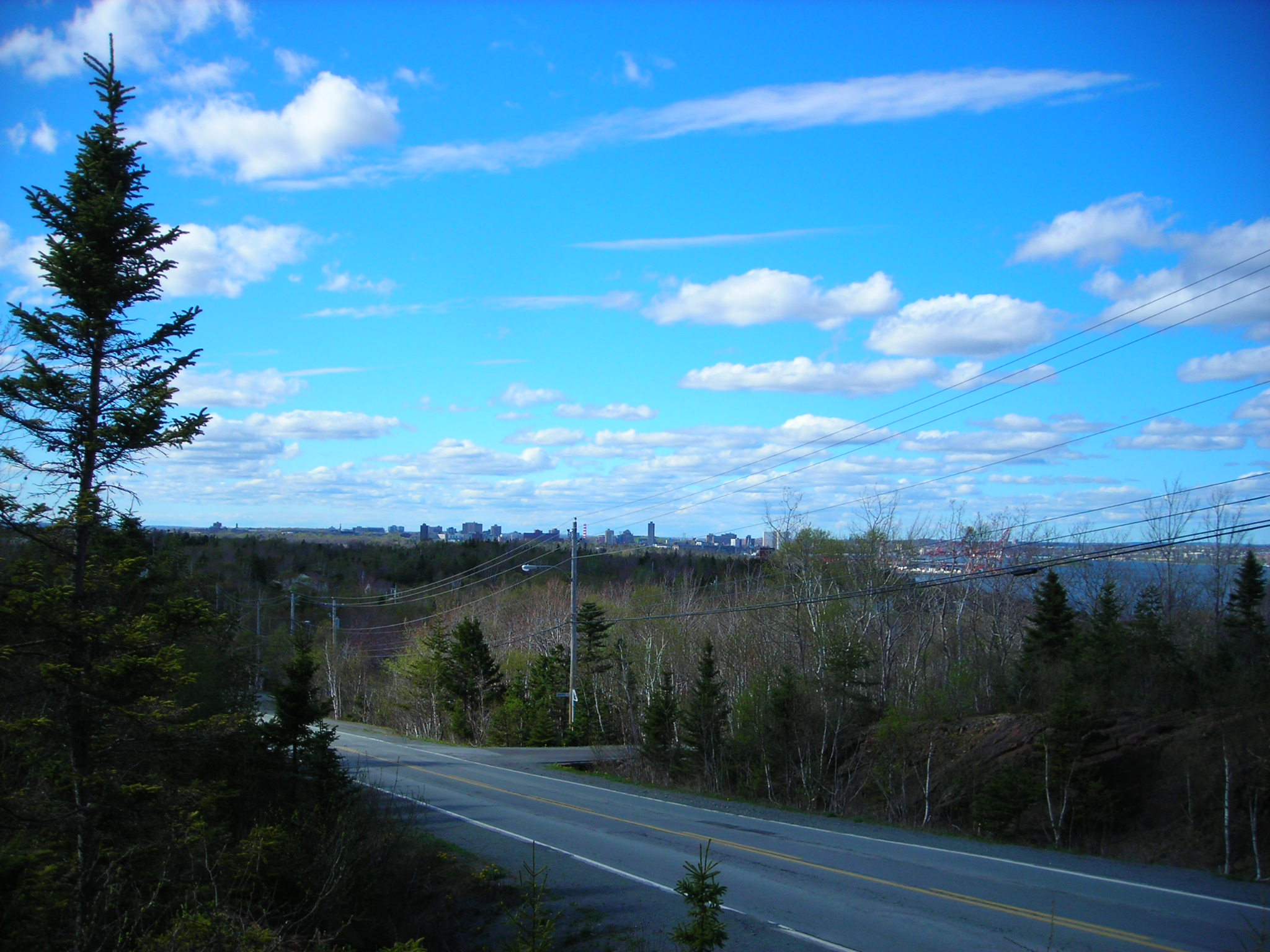
View north on Route 253 near York Redoubt.

- Armdale
- Jollimore
- Boulderwood
- Purcell's Cove
- Ferguson's Cove
- Herring Cove

== List of parks ==
=== Provincial ===
- Herring Cove Provincial Park Reserve

=== Federal ===
- York Redoubt National Historic Site

=== Municipal ===
- Sir Sandford Fleming Park
- Chocolate Lake Park

== Yacht clubs ==
- Royal Nova Scotian Yacht Squadron
- Armdale Yacht Club

== See also ==
- List of Nova Scotia provincial highways
