= Fergusons Cove =

Suburban community in Nova Scotia, Canada

Coordinates: 44°35′59″N 63°33′35″W

Fergusons Cove in Nova Scotia

Fergusons Cove is a suburban community within the Halifax Regional Municipality (HRM), Nova Scotia on the western shore of Halifax Harbour between Purcell's Cove and Herring Cove along Route 253. The first 3 digits of the postal code in the area are B3V.

== History ==
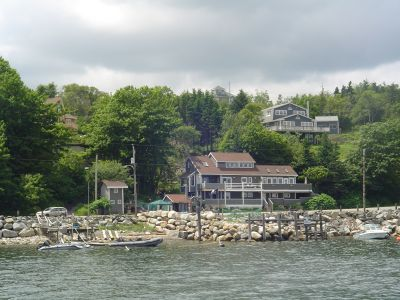
Fergusons Cove: a view from the water.

First settled in 1788 by William Glazebrook. It was initially known as Falkland, named after Lady Falkland, wife of Lucius Bentinck Falkland, one of the Lieutenant Governors of Nova Scotia. The Lynch family from Ireland settled in 1803. Another of the earliest settlers was William Embley from Newfoundland, who served in the Royal Navy. He relocated to Fergusons Cove after being discharged in 1811.

The community was connected to Spryfield, a community further inland on the Chebucto Peninsula, by a road which began at the foot of the steep hill just to the north of York Redoubt, and ended in the Roach's Pond area of Spryfield. This is now a footpath which is seldom used, and slowly reverting to a natural state – but still easily followed and well worth the time to hike. The Fergusons Cove entrance is just south of an old quarry, while the Sprfield entrance is behind the sewer treatment plant at the end of Princeton Ave.

There were several slate quarries in the community in the early 20th century, but none are active today.

Many of the men of the community in its early days made their living as harbour pilots. By the latter part of the 20th century, however, it had become a "bedroom community" for Halifax.

It is still a sparsely-settled area, but much development has taken place in the past 30 years, especially on the upper end of the housing market.

=== Fire of 2009 ===
A notable recent event in the community's history (other than the Hell's Angels having an informal "club house" in part of the ruined fortifications by the ocean at the end of the road which goes past York Redoubt – in the late 1970s and early 1980s), was the fire of 1 and 2 May 2009. The fire started in the vicinity of Roach's Pond in Spryfield, and spread rapidly to the Fergusons Cove area, aided by high winds and much dry debris from Hurricane Juan, which has made much of the HRM region prone to greater forest fire damage than normal. It caused the closure of both Herring Cove and Purcell's Cove Roads, and forced the evacuation of almost 1500 people, mostly in the Fergusons Cove area, where 8 houses were completely destroyed and a dozen others badly damaged. It burned about 600 acres (2.4 km^{2}) in all, and was the worst fire in the area since 1964 when severe fires burned large portions of the forested area of Spryfield. Nobody was seriously injured in the blaze.

== Military presence ==
Due to the elevation in the area and its subsequent overview of the approaches to Halifax Harbour the high bluffs from Fergusons Cove to Chebucto Head have been used as defensive positions for the city at least as far back as 1793. In addition, the Navy operates Damage Control Training Facility Kootenay just south of the fort, its grounds containing the former training battery for York Redoubt at Sandwich Point.

=== Fort York Redoubt ===
A large coastal defense fort called York Redoubt was established in the community in 1793, it was active through both world wars and ceased operations in 1956. The fort is now a National Historic Site.
