= Kidston Lake =

Lake in Nova Scotia, Canada

- Location within Nova Scotia
- Location: Halifax Regional Municipality, Nova Scotia
- Coordinates: 44°35′45″N 63°37′12″W
- Type: acidic glacial lake with somewhat limited fauna
- Primary inflows: small stream at southern end and springs
- Primary outflows: stream at northern end which feeds into the Macintosh Runs which empties into the Atlantic Ocean at Herring Cove
- Basin countries: Canada
- Max. length: 630 m (2,070 ft)
- Max. width: ~ 50 to 300 m (160 to 980 ft)
- Average depth: up to 20 feet (6.1 m). South end shallow. Muddy bottom.
- Shore length^{1}: rocky in most places, with an artificial beach on the east side. Where there is no rock, the forest grows to the shoreline.
- Islands: one flat rock called the Whale's Back, about 5 square metres (54 sq ft)
- Settlements: about 9 km (5.6 mi) from downtown Halifax
- ^{1} Shore length is not a well-defined measure.

Kidston Lake is a lake in the Spryfield area of Halifax Regional Municipality, Nova Scotia, Canada. An area along its eastern shore has been made into a municipal park, with artificial sand beaches and a lifeguard in the summer months. It is a popular swimming destination and offers a good swim from the beach to two rock formations called Breadloaf and the Whale's Back. There are trails all around the lake, and going to Leblin Park and other places such as the Greystone and Green Acres subdivisions. The granite barrens south of the lake are an excellent place to find blueberries, which foxes and porcupines share with the more adventurous of the local children. The most famous portion of the park is the Rocking Stone, a 90+ ton glacial erratic boulder which can still be rocked with a lever, but which used to move quite easily, before a band of sailors from the nearby Halifax garrison rocked it into a more stable configuration in the 1890s, and before its base was worn down by excessive rocking in the 1980s and 90s when the park was first developed. A lesser known but equally interesting large glacially-deposited granite monolith called Table Rock, can be found NW of the narrow passage at the northern end of the lake, where it empties into a boggy area: it is a flat, approximately 30 ton rock firmly balanced upon three rocks, the smallest of which is about the size of a volleyball.

== History ==
The area has been repeatedly logged, mostly in the 20th century. Until about 1963, a small logging operation with a mill was situated on the lake, and a large pile of sawdust subsequently accumulated. The Rocking Stone there used to be a popular picnic destination in Victorian times: people would travel from Halifax, climb upon it and spread their lunches while enjoying the sensation of rocking gently while seated upon the huge rock. The most popular swimming spot in the Spryfield area of HRM, its eastern shore was made into a municipal park and an artificial sandy beach was constructed. A subdivision was built nearby in the same time-frame (is still being added to, as of 2010), between the lake and the nearby subdivision of Thornhill Park, and further developments threaten the western shore of the lake.

== Geology, biology and hydrology ==
Kidston Lake is situated on Devonian granite, which is part of a major igneous intrusion into the local Silurian slate of the "Meguma" group, which has been used to support the theory that the eastern part of Nova Scotia was once joined to NW Africa. The thin acidic soil supports relatively scrubby mixed forests dominated by spruce, fir, red maple and birch, extensive bogs and rocky barrens. The lake itself is fed mostly by underground springs and a small stream coming in at its south end. It drains at its north end, into a stream which runs into Kidston Pond, beside the old Kidston farm and estate. The south end is quite shallow and weedy, while the middle is up to 20 feet deep and provides good swimming. An earthen dam at the north end helps keep water levels up: it was built by loggers in the early part of the 1900s. The lake's water was polluted by fine sawdust until the 1990s, which reduced the amount of wildlife, but it has since cleared and fish can be found there now, as well as many frogs and invertebrate species. The lake is quite acidic, since its watershed is dominated by bogs and granite. Beavers live on the lake periodically, and currently (2011), there is an active beaver lodge in the northern end of the lake, on the NW shore.

== See also ==
- List of lakes in Nova Scotia
