= Spryfield =

- Suburban Community
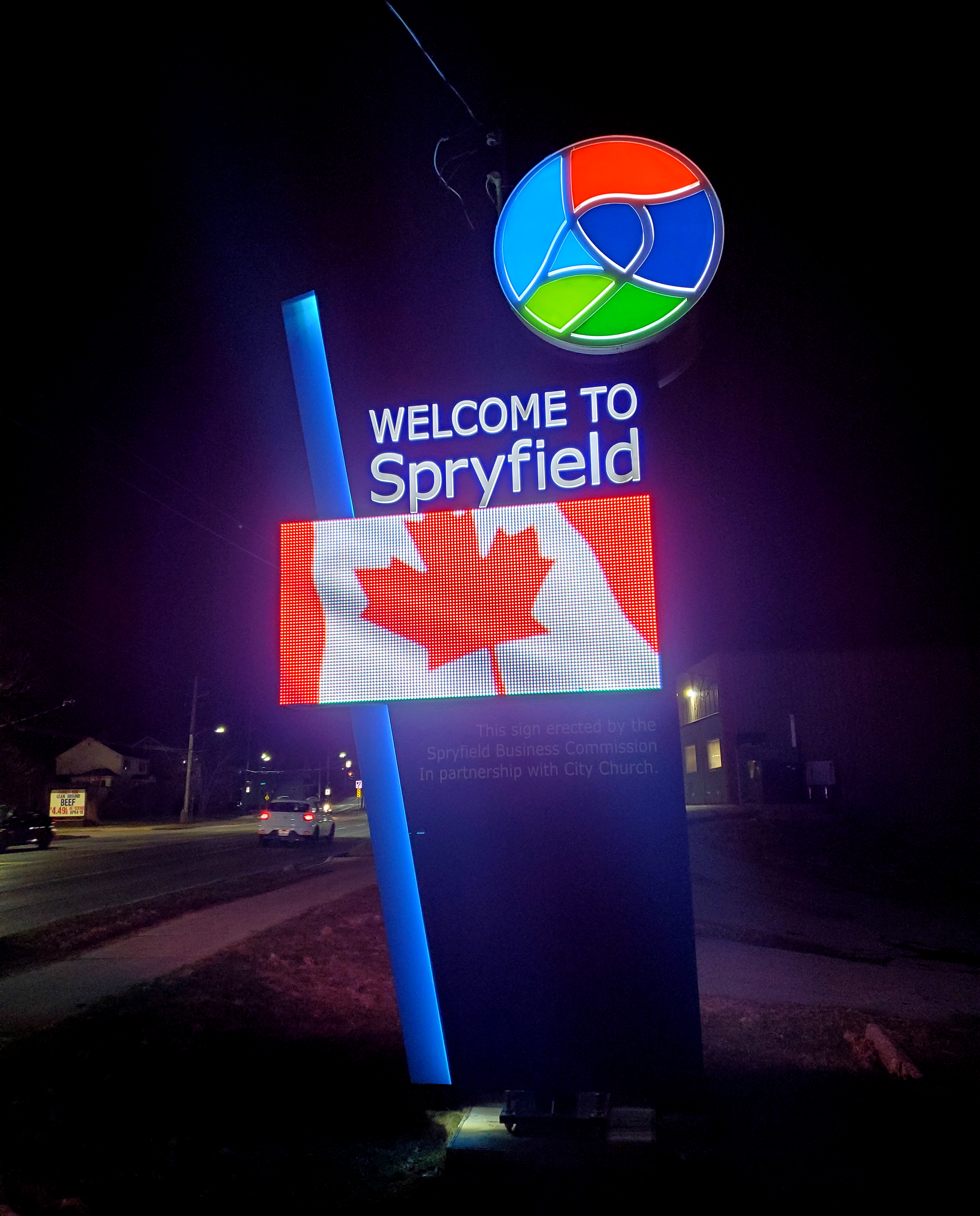

- Location within Nova Scotia
- Coordinates: 44°36′42″N 63°37′04″W
- Country: Canada
- Province: Nova Scotia
- Municipality: Halifax
- Community: Spryfield
- Municipal District: District 11 (Spryfield-Sambro Loop-Prospect Road)
- Founded: 1769
- Amalgamated with Halifax: 1968. Became part of the HRM in 1996

Area
  - Land: 10.74 km^{2} (4.15 sq mi)

Population (2016)
  - Total: 11,728
  - Density: 1,091/km^{2} (2,830/sq mi)
- Time zone: UTC-4 (AST)
  - Summer (DST): UTC-3 (ADT)
- Canadian Postal code: B
- Area codes: 782, 902

Spryfield is a community within the urban area of Halifax, Nova Scotia, Canada.

== History ==
The land now known as Spryfield was first occupied by the Miꞌkmaq people, who hunted and fished at Beaver Lake (now called Long Lake). The Miꞌkmaq would later help the first Europeans in settling upon their arrival by the mid-18th century.

The community gets its name from Captain Lieutenant-General William Spry, who purchased land in the area in 1769. Originally known as Spry's Field, the community is centred on Spry's former estate.

Founded around 1770, by Captain William Spry, who purchased land there and established the settlement with the aid of stationed soldiers from the nearby Halifax garrison. In 1783, he sold the property and returned to England. The name Spryfield is also sometimes used to refer to the general area of Halifax's South Mainland, which includes a number of communities along the Herring Cove and Purcell's Cove Roads.

The availability of land suitable for farming, and the relative close proximity to the Halifax market attracted the European settlers. These included the Brunt, Connors, Drysdale, Findlay, Henneberry, Kidston, McInnis, Moor, Norris, Oakley, Sutherland, Umlah, Warner, Yeadon, and other-families—many of whom still reside in the community today.

Spryfield's first public school opened in 1859. Its teacher, Elizabeth Sutherland, taught the town's early residents. In 1958, Elizabeth Sutherland Memorial School opened in her honour.

Of particular note was Henry Lieblin, a Halifax baker who held 203 ha (500 acres) of land by the latter 18th-century. A large development, Lieblin Park, began in the early-1950s. It was named in his honour. Lieblin's farm was about where Elmsdale Crescent is today.

As the community developed—and more people moved to the community, Spryfield mainly consisted of homes-and-roads off three main-roads (Herring Cove Road, The Northwest Arm Drive, and Old Sambro Road). However, after World War II, developers began to build subdivisions to accommodate the many new residents of the still rapidly growing greater Halifax area. Leiblin Park and Thornhill Park were among the first, being built from 1955 to 1965. Later developments include a large development in the Colpitt Lake barrens area, Cowie Hill, Elgin subdivision, Green Acres (which was left unfinished), Greystone (formerly Carson Street) subdivision, a modest cooperative development by the McIntosh Runs across from B.C. Silver Junior High School, and three subdivisions off Williams Lake Road. Initially, these were single-family dwellings, but higher densities began to be achieved by the late-1970s, when the Cowie Hill subdivision was built with mostly townhouses, and two large apartment-buildings. Greystone is mostly row houses, and there are now a number of apartment building complexes in the area. such as the one off River Road, facing J.L. Ilsley High School, and the 500 block near Green Acres.

Until 1968, Spryfield was a part of Halifax County. It voted to become a part of the City of Halifax in that year, via a general referendum. In 1969, the City of Halifax annexed Spryfield, as well as Armdale, Clayton Park, Fairview, and Rockingham.

On 1 April 1996, Halifax County was dissolved and all of its places (cities, suburbs, towns, and villages) were turned into communities of a single-tier municipality named Halifax Regional Municipality. Subsequently, Spryfield was turned into a community within the new Municipality of Halifax.

Spryfield has a history of large forest fires, which in more recent decades seems to have peaked in the 1960s, when a number of large fires burned a significant proportion of the forests in the area. The largest Spryfield fire of the 21st-century began on 29 April 2009, when a forest fire erupted in the afternoon in the Green Acres area, forcing as many as 1,000 people to flee their homes. As many as 12 houses were destroyed and an area of approximately 800 ha (2,000 acres) burned, between the Herring Cove and Purcell's Cove Roads. The fire travelled quickly between these major roads on April 30 due to strong winds but did not cross either of them. The cause of the fire was determined to be an unextinguished campfire situated north of Roaches Pond on the bank of the MacIntosh Run. Firefighters from Halifax Regional Fire and Emergency and the Nova Scotia Department of Natural Resources fought the fire. The investigation by the Nova Scotia Department of Natural Resources uncovered two additional fires that occurred in an area east of J.L. Ilsley High School that are believed to have been caused by arson.

== Geography ==
According to the Halifax Regional Municipality Urban Forest Master Plan of 2013, the community of Spryfield has a landmass of 1,074 hectares (10.74 km^{2}), and is bounded to the north by Armdale, to the south by Long Pond and to the east by the Purcell's Cove Road.

Geologically, Spryfield's terrain is largely dominated by granite rock. Some meguma slates run along the edge of the Northwest Arm. The area's soils generally consist of coarse, thin sands from which numerous exposed granite hilltops and ridges protrude. Several glacial erratics can be found in the area in the form of large boulders that were deposited by retreating glaciers. One notable glacial erratic in Spryfield is the Rocking Stone, after which the Rockingstone neighbourhood is named. The Rocking Stone, located in Kidston Lake Park, is of interest both due to its size and its former ability to rock back and forth when pushed on by visitors. Over the years, the stone became more difficult to rock due to debris becoming lodged beneath it, eventually becoming completely stationary. In the 1990s, a local fire department removed some of the debris and the rock was able to be moved again with the aid of a lever, but in its current state, has been immobile for several years.

The forest ecosystem in Spryfield has been shaped by recent forest fires and has allowed several fire-associated tree species to flourish such as the jack pine (Pinus banksiana), the red pine (Pinus resinosa), and the red oak. The jack pine is notable is notable as a serotinous species whose seeds only germinate after exposure to fire. Forest fires have also created several areas of barrens that are dominated by ericaceous shrubs contain tree species such as the black spruce (Picea mariana), the balsam fir (Abies balsamea), and the eastern white pine (Pinus strobus).

== Parks and recreation ==
Spryfield has numerous lakes of various sizes for swimming and non-motorized boating in the summer months, which offers programs to children and youth year-round. The community is surrounded by forested areas, and in addition to the lakes there are numerous opportunities for berry-picking, exploring, and hiking.

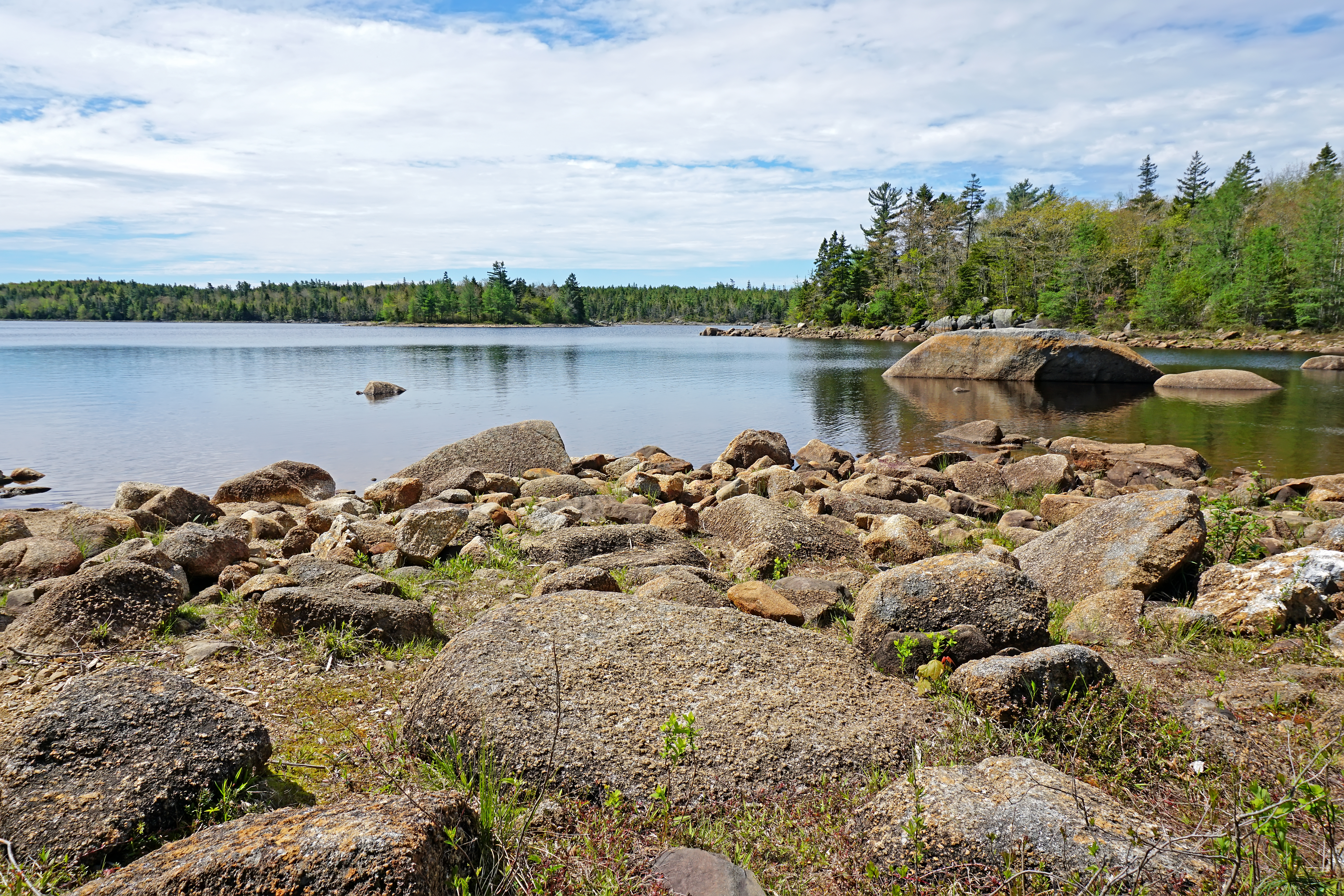
Long Lake Provincial Park

Community Centres

- Boys & Girls Clubs of Greater Halifax
- Captain William Spry Community Centre
- Spryfield Judo Kai

Community Gardens

- Urban Farm Museum Society of Spryfield

Fields

- Graves-Oakley Memorial Park

Libraries

- Captain William Spry Community Centre

Masonic Lodges

- Duke of Kent 121

Museums

- Mainland South Heritage Society
- Urban Farm Museum Society of Spryfield

Mutual Societies

- Chebucto Connections
- Pathways to Education

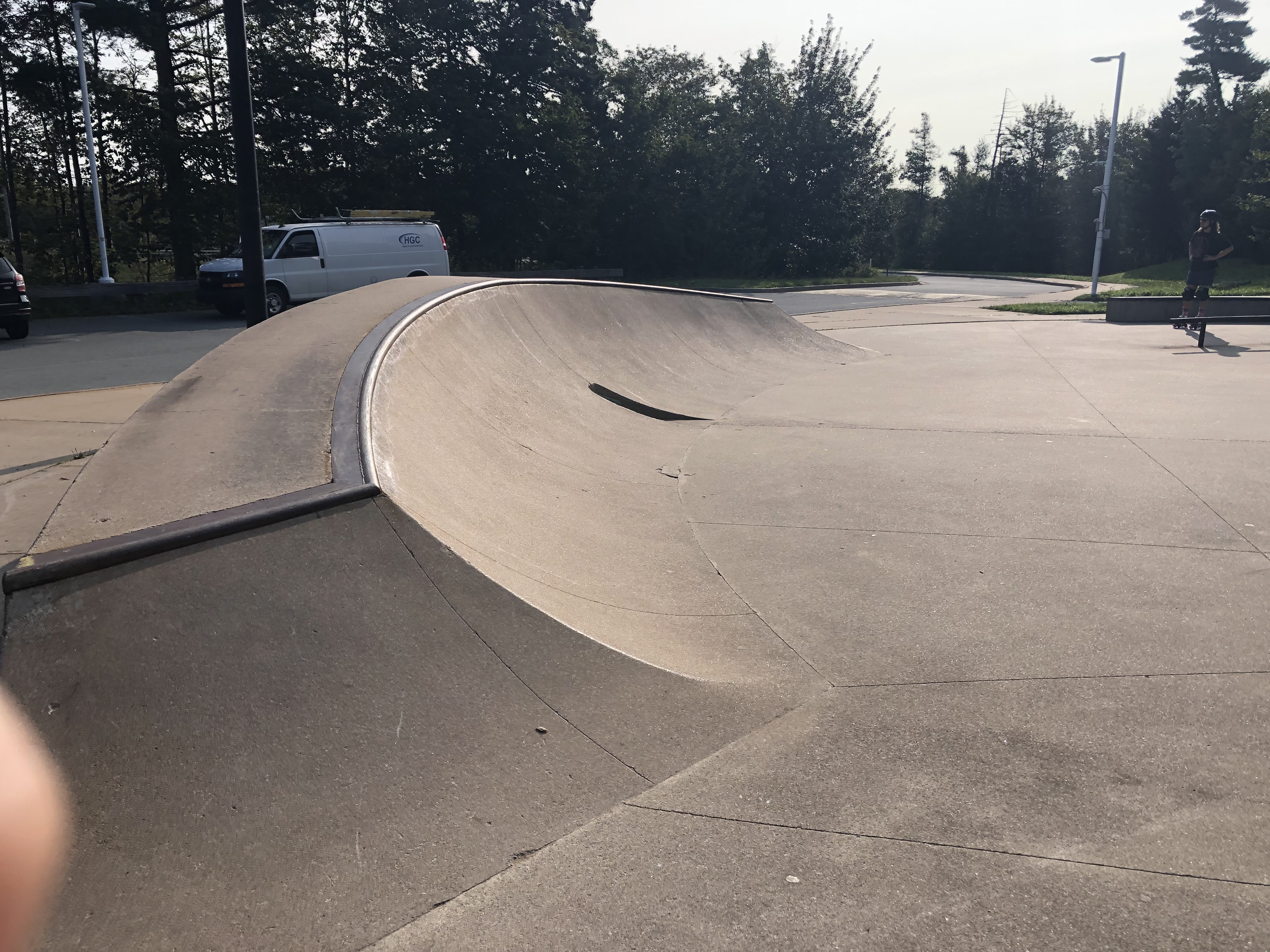
A skatepark in Spryfield

Parks

- Graves-Oakley Memorial Park
- Long Lake Provincial Park

Pools

- Captain William Spry Community Centre

Trails

- McIntosh Run Community Trail

== Demographics ==
According to the article Spryfield Highlights by Dennis Pilkey (sourced from 2016 Census information), Spryfield had a population of 11,728 people, and a population density of approximately 1,091 people per km^{2}. In 2016, the population density of Spryfield was over 14 times as dense as the municipal population density.

Although there is demographic from the 2016 Census, there is no demographic information from the most current 2021 Census.

== Economy ==
From the time of colonization until the 1950s, Spryfield was predominantly rural with many farms. The earliest farms were the Kidston Farm (near Thornhill Park), and the Umlah Farm (south of Long Lake).

In the early part of the 20th century, there was a granite quarrying operation in what is now the northern portion of Long Lake Provincial Park. Much of this granite can still be seen in historic buildings and walls in Downtown Halifax.

Until the late 1950s, aggregate pits and gravel pits, such as the operation to the south of Elizabeth Sutherland Memorial School, helped provide material for building local roads until the late 1950s. Most of Spryfield has been logged at least once, and until the mid-1960s, a sawmill operated on the east-side of Kidston Lake.

Until approximately 1960, there was relatively (compared to overall population density) more business and industrial activity in the Spryfield area than subsequently. In the 1960s and 1970s, many people began to travel to Downtown Halifax to the shopping centres and malls within the built-up area of Halifax to do their purchases. Eventually, the community took on a bedroom community aspect: many of the residents work elsewhere, with fewer thriving local businesses. The establishment of the Spryfield Mall in the mid-1970s was an attempt to reverse this trend, but it struggled to fill its floorspace. However, there is still a vigorous and growing business community in the Spryfield area, with a good amount of recent development.

== Transportation ==
Spryfield is serviced by many roads that traverse the community. Furthermore, public transit is provided by Halifax Transit, and many routes serve the community.

Roadways

- Highway 32 (Dunbrack Street), which connects to Highway 3 (St. Margaret's Bay Road), Highway 102 (Bicentennial Highway), and Route 306 (Old Sambro Road)
- Route 306 (Old Sambro Road)
- Route 349 (Herring Cove Road), off which all other roads in Spryfield branch either primarily or secondarily
- William's Lake Road, which connects Route 253 (Purcell's Cove Road) to Route 349 (Herring Cove Road)

== Education ==
To service the continuous development of apartment-complexes, detached-homes, and subdivisions, there are schools located in Spryfield for all ages. This includes day cares, elementary schools, a high school, and junior high schools. Children may attend English-or-French Immersion speaking classes starting in elementary school.

All public schools within Spryfield are administered by the Halifax Regional Centre for Education.

Elementary Schools

- Central Spryfield Elementary
- Chebucto Height Elementary School
- Elizabeth Sutherland School
- John W. Macleod Fleming Tower Elementary (Fleming Tower)
- John W. Macleod Fleming Tower Elementary (John W. MacLeod)
- Rockingstone Heights School

High Schools

- J. L. Ilsley High School

Junior High Schools

- Cunard Junior High School
- Elizabeth Sutherland School
- Herring Cove Junior High
- Rockingstone Heights School

== Politics ==
Federal

- Andy Fillmore is the Member of Parliament for Halifax, which in 2004 was re-organized to include the community of Spryfield.

Municipal

- Patty Cuttell is the Municipal Councillor for District 11 (Spryfield-Sambro Loop-Prospect Road).

Provincial

- Brendan Maguire is the Member of the Legislative Assembly for Halifax Atlantic, the constituency that includes the community of Spryfield. He was elected in 2013.

== Notable people ==
- Jackie Barrett – Special Olympics Powerlifter, amassed fifteen powerlifting medals at four Special Olympics World Games appearances
- John Buchnan - former Premier of Nova Scotia
- Joey Comeau – writer, creator of A Softer World
- Peter North – (born Alden Brown) pornographic performer and producer
- Matt Robinson – poet
- Troy Ryan - Head coach of the Canada women's national ice hockey team and PWHL Toronto
