= Duncans Cove, Nova Scotia =

Community and cove in Nova Scotia, Canada

Duncans Cove in Nova Scotia

Duncans Cove is a small rural community on the Chebucto Peninsula in the Halifax Regional Municipality on the shore of the Atlantic Ocean on the Ketch Harbour Road (Route 349), 19 kilometers from Halifax. The community is located beside Chebucto Head, the prominent coastal headland.

== History ==
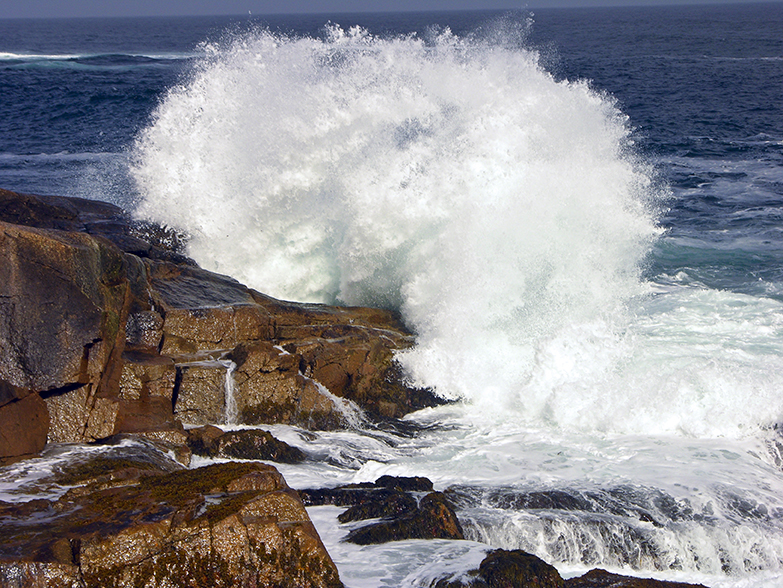
Wave's crash on the rocks in Duncans Cove

The original Mi'kmaw name for Duncans Cove is Uni'knitujk (translated as "Little Portage"). Duncans Cove was first settled by Europeans as a small fishing community. The first recorded settler in Duncans Cove was Simon Duntoyn in 1752. Other families followed including the Crab, Full, Leonard and McNab families. Timothy Sullivan was granted 8 acres and Daniel Gallagher was granted 7 3/4 acres in 1842. John McNab was granted 50 acres (200,000 m^{2}) in 1859. The cove was named after Admiral Adam Duncan, 1st Viscount Duncan who defeated the Dutch at the Battle of Camperdown.

Overlooking the entrance to Halifax Harbour made it a strategic part of Halifax's defense system in the 18th century. The Camperdown Signal Station, was built a few miles northward next to nearby Portuguese Cove in 1797, the first of a series of signal stations built by Prince Edward, Duke of Kent. It later became a wireless station and was operational until 1925.

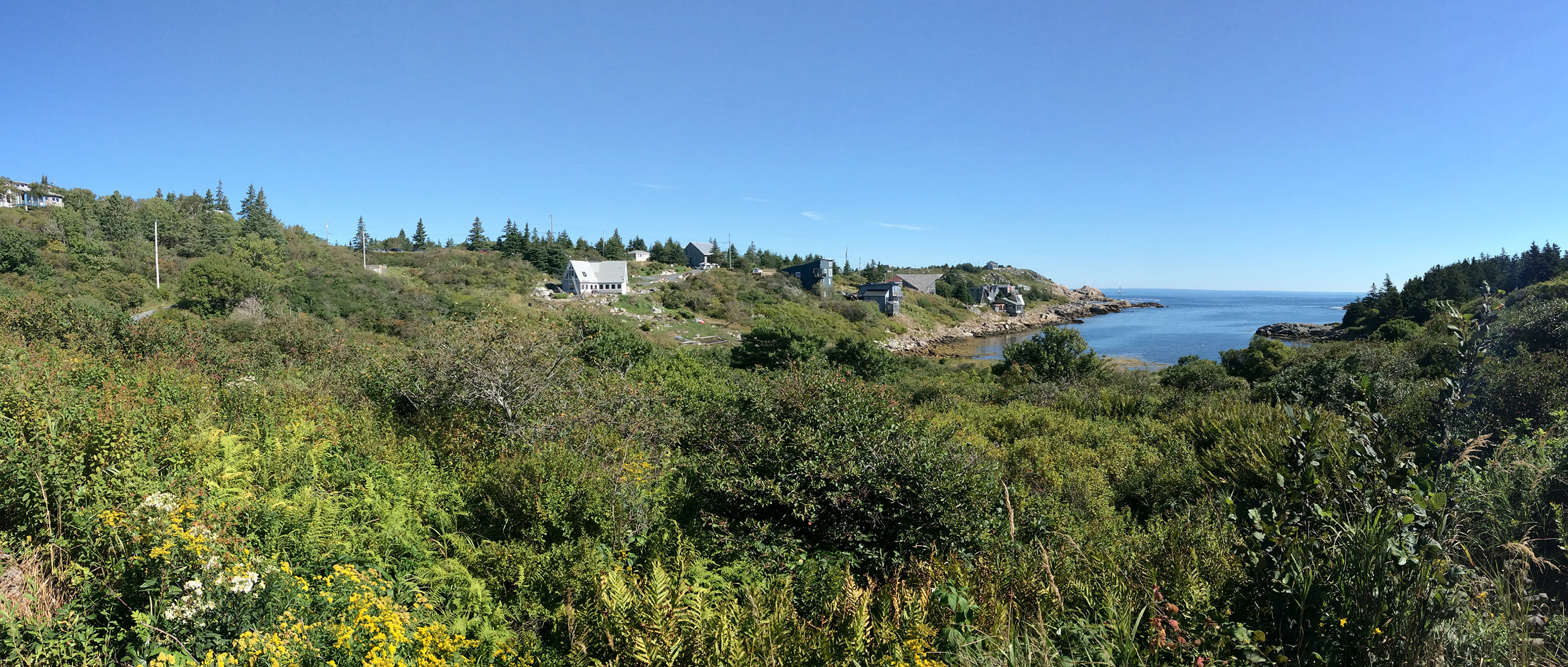
Duncans Cove from Gannet Lane

In World War Two, the area around Chebucto Head, including Duncans Cove, became a fortified coastal battery armed with three Elswick 6 inch naval guns. For these cannon, a four-story concrete director tower was built near the eastern shore of Duncans Cove with a long-range optical rangefinder installed on the top floor. By 1943, this range-finding apparatus had been supplanted by the latest radar artillery control unit. The battery complex was decommissioned in the 1950s but many bunkers remain, some converted into private residences.

In the late 1950s two families of musicians who played with the Atlantic Symphony Orchestra moved to Duncans Cove. One of those families embarked upon a decades-long construction project of unconventionally shaped timber-framed dwellings, and even had a small private airstrip. By the late 1960s, fishing from the cove had dwindled and the community become known as an artists colony, with many symphony players, visual artists and theatrical actors residing there. The landmark gunnery director tower stood derelict for many years, until finally passing into private hands in the 1990s. The building is virtually unrecognizable today, having been radically converted into a luxury residence.

The community, and the cove, are sometimes spelled as Duncan's Cove. The Canadian Geographic Names Database lists the community without an apostrophe: Duncans Cove.

== Nature Reserve ==
Duncans Cove Nature Reserve
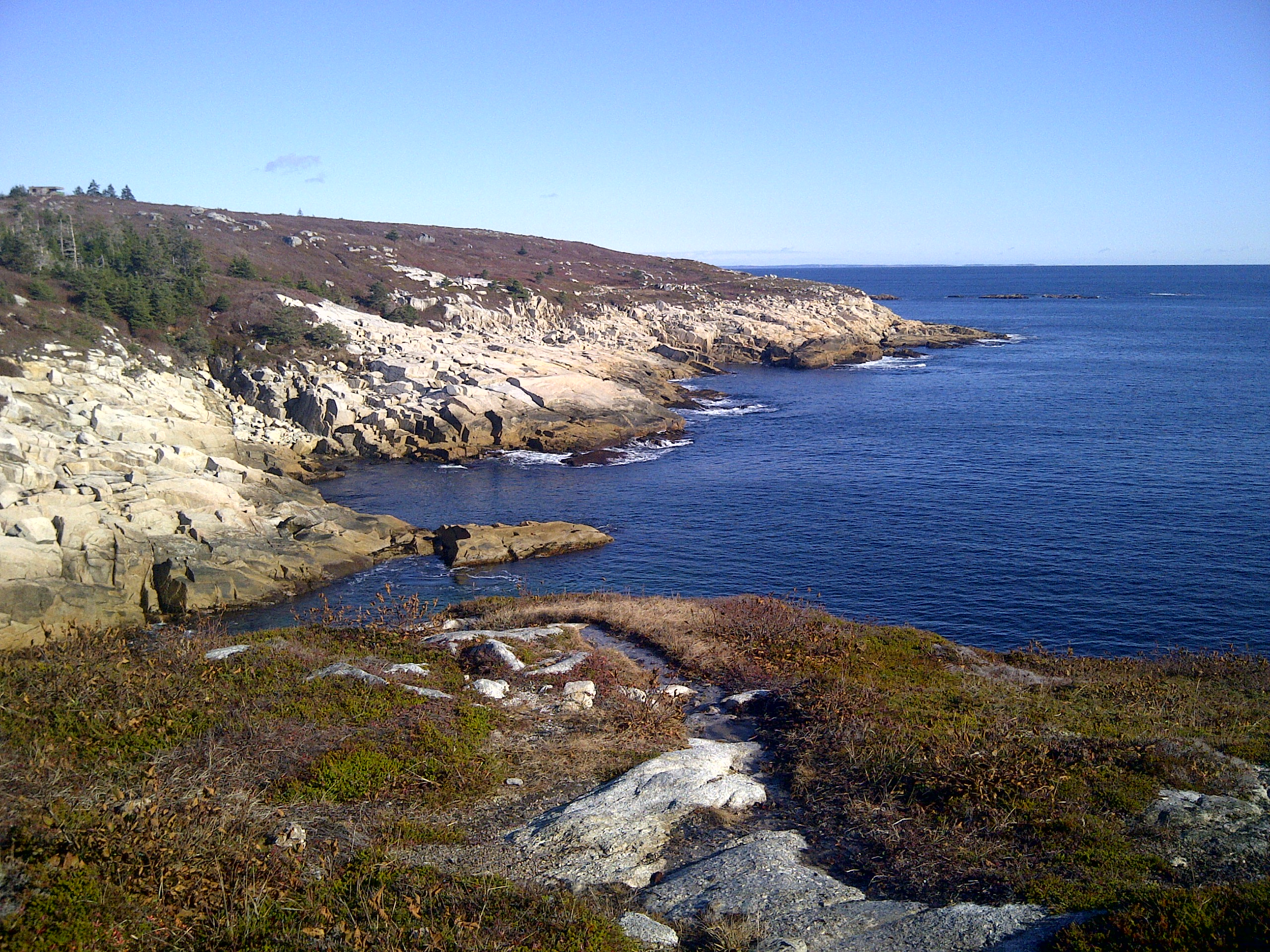
- Interactive map of Duncans Cove Nature Reserve
- Nearest city: Halifax, Nova Scotia
- Coordinates: 44°30′03″N 63°31′54″W
- Length: 4 km (2.5 mi)
- Width: 0.75 km (0.47 mi)
- Area: 369 ha (910 acres)

A portion of the coastline near Duncans Cove has been designated as a Nature Reserve by the Province of Nova Scotia. It is located in the Pennant Granite Barrens natural landscape, and represents a typical coastal headland, barren, and bog complex. It is the only location in Mainland Nova Scotia where the Arctic Blueberry is known to grow. A hiking trail runs through the southern portion of this nature reserve past two of the former World War Two fortifications, and is well-used due to its proximity to downtown Halifax.

== Communications ==
- Telephone exchange 902 - 868
- First three digits of postal code - B3V

== Lighthouse ==
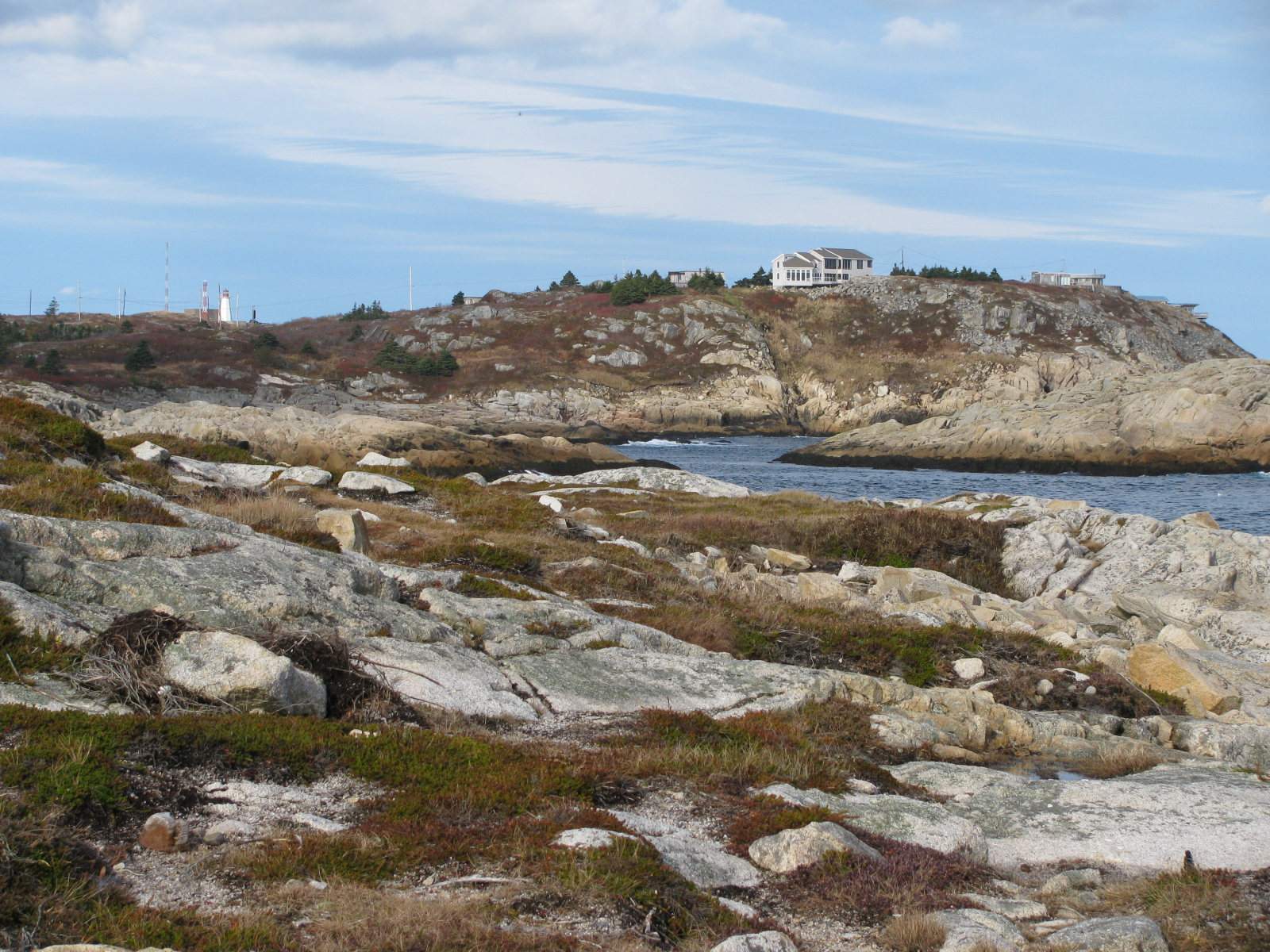
Duncans Cove, showing the Chebucto Head Lighthouse at left and a battery at right

The first of several lighthouses was built at Chebucto Head in 1872 with a steam foghorn just below it. The lighthouse was moved in 1940 several hundred metres to the north to make way for the gun battery. The lighthouse included a launch ramp for a lifeboat, as well as an old naval carronade for firing blank charges as a crude foghorn. Some ruins of the original lighthouse can be seen to this day (2008)

The present lighthouse, a concrete tower, was built in 1967 and is situated high atop a bluff. The lighthouse was automated in the 1990s, and an array of remote navigational aids was erected. The light-keepers house was left vacant for several years, then rented, and then vacant once more. It was burned by vandals in 2004.

There is an area of pavement around the base of the lighthouse tower which once served as a parking lot popular with sightseers. The road leading up to the lighthouse has been closed to vehicle traffic and is now accessible only by foot. It is a whale-watching location during January and February when pods of fin whales feed in the area before migrating elsewhere.
