= Siegfried Haase =

Canadian Painter known for Impressionist Artwork

Siegfried Fritz Haase
- Born: September 1, 1916; Stolp, Pomerania, Germany
- Died: June 6, 1996 (aged 79); Ottawa, Ontario, Canada
- Citizenship: German, Canadian
- Education: School of Typography and Advertising in Stolp, Pomerania, Germany; United State School of Free and Applied Arts
- Years active: 1935–1996
- Known for: Painter, Sculptor, Professor, Expressionism Artwork, Printmaking, Sketches
- Style: Expressionism
- Spouse: Hedwig M. Haase (m. 1940)

Siegfried Fritz Haase (1916–1996) was a German-Canadian artist. Born in Pomerania, Germany, he is known for expressionism during World War II and as an associate professor at the Nova Scotia College of Art and Design from 1964 to 1984.

After relocating to Cambridge, Ontario, in 1984, Haase opened a studio in Kitchener, in 1985, and finally moved to Ottawa, where he resided until his death in 1996. Haase's artwork is exhibited in various art galleries, archives, and collections across Canada, including the City of Ottawa Art Collection, Artexte, the Dalhousie Art Gallery, the Beaverbrook Art Gallery, the Art Gallery of Nova Scotia, the Nova Scotia Art Bank, the Canadian Museum of History, the Art Gallery of Ontario, and the National Gallery of Canada Library and Archives In 1994, the Art Gallery of Nova Scotia released John Murchie's book on Haase, titled "Keeping Faith: The Life and Work of Siegfried Haase." The publication notes "the artist's German origins, the influence of Expressionism, and an interest in portraiture".

== Early career ==
Haase began his artistic journey in the 1930s by enrolling in Business school and at the School of Typography and Advertising in Stolp, Pomerania, Germany to become a commercial artist. In 1936, he moved to Berlin, continuing his studies at the United State School of Free and Applied Arts. While studying in Berlin, Haase had the opportunity to work in the studio of Käthe Kollwitz, a renowned German artist whose works depicted realism, but are now closely associated with Expressionism. Haase has described his expressionist style as being deeply influenced by Max Pechstein, and "was always proud of the fact that as a teen he had carried Max Pechstein's paint box".

== Second World War ==
During the Second World War, Haase worked as a radio operator and war artist. Close to the end of the war, many of his paintings were destroyed. Following the post-war period, Haase, his wife Hedwig M. Haase, and younger daughter Barbara M Haase, immigrated to Halifax, Nova Scotia, in October 1952, choosing to settle in the community of Herring Cove. Haase's older daughter, Ingrid M. Haase, had stayed in school in Germany until arriving at Herring Cove, on September 19, 1953 aboard ship Italia, docking at Pier 21. Following his arrival to Canada, Haase worked at both the Eastern Photo Engravers company and Maritime Photo Engravers Limited until 1957.

== Academic career ==
In 1964, Haase became an associate professor at the Nova Scotia College of Art and Design. His course teachings included printmaking, illustration and graphic techniques. In 1982, he partially retired for health reasons. Haase continued to teach at NSCAD University in a limited capacity until 1984. After his career in education, Haase relocated to Cambridge, Ontario, in 1984. He opened a studio in Kitchener, Ontario, in 1985 and later moved to Ottawa, where he lived until his death in 1996.

== Personal life ==
Haase was born on 1 September 1916, to Minna Albertine Emma, b. Retzke (mother), and Reinhold Hermann Franz Haase (father). He had four sisters: Traute, Anna, Christel, and Eleonore Haase. Born a Lutherian, he converted to Catholicism later in his life. Prior to his immigration to Canada, Haase married his wife, Hedwig M. Haase, in Germany. The couple had two daughters: Ingrid M. Haase, born in 1940, and a younger daughter, Barbara M Haase. Ingrid, choosing to stay in school in Germany until 1953, arrived in Canada nearly a year after Haase, his wife and younger daughter had immigrated to Herring Cove.
