= Nova Scotia Route 306 =

Highway in Nova Scotia, Canada

Route 306

Route information
- Maintained by Nova Scotia Department of Transportation and Infrastructure Renewal
- Length: 19 km (12 mi)

Major junctions
- South end: Route 349 in Sambro
- North end: Route 349 in Spryfield

Location
- Country: Canada
- Province: Nova Scotia
- Counties: Halifax Regional Municipality

Highway system
- Provincial highways in Nova Scotia; 100-series
← Route 305	→ Route 307

Route 306 is a collector road in the Canadian province of Nova Scotia.

It is located in the Halifax Regional Municipality and connects Spryfield at Route 349 with Sambro at Route 349.

It is also known as "Old Sambro Road."

== Communities ==
- Spryfield
- Leiblin Park
- Harrietsfield
- Williamswood
- Sambro

== Parks ==
- Long Lake Provincial Park
- Crystal Crescent Provincial Park

== See also ==
- List of Nova Scotia provincial highways
