= Boulderwood, Halifax =

Coordinates: 44°37′23″N 63°36′00″W

Boulderwood is a Residential subdivision in Armdale on Mainland Halifax within the Halifax Regional Municipality Nova Scotia on the shore of the Northwest Arm in Halifax Harbour .
