= Nova Scotia Route 349 =

Highway in Nova Scotia, Canada

Route 349

Route information
- Maintained by Nova Scotia Department of Transportation and Infrastructure Renewal
- Length: 25 km (16 mi)

Major junctions
- South end: Margus Lane in Sambro
- Route 306 in Sambro; Route 253 in Herring Cove; Route 306 in Spryfield; Route 253 in Armdale
- North end: Trunk 3 in Armdale

Location
- Country: Canada
- Province: Nova Scotia

Highway system
- Provincial highways in Nova Scotia; 100-series
← Route 348	→ Route 354

Route 349 is collector road in the Canadian province of Nova Scotia.

It is located in the Halifax Regional Municipality and connects Armdale at the Armdale Traffic Circle with Sambro.

It runs on Herring Cove Road from Armdale to Herring Cove, the Ketch Harbour Road from Herring Cove to Sambro, and Old Sambro Road within Sambro to the highway's terminus at the end of Bull Point.

== Communities ==
- Armdale
- Cowie Hill
- Spryfield
- Herring Cove
- Portuguese Cove
- Halibut Bay
- Bear Cove
- Duncan's Cove
- Ketch Harbour
- Sambro Head
- Sambro

== Parks ==
- Crystal Crescent Provincial Park

== See also ==
- List of Nova Scotia provincial highways
