= Long Lake Provincial Park (Nova Scotia) =

Park in Halifax, Canada

Coordinates: 44°37′2.89″N 63°38′7.03″W

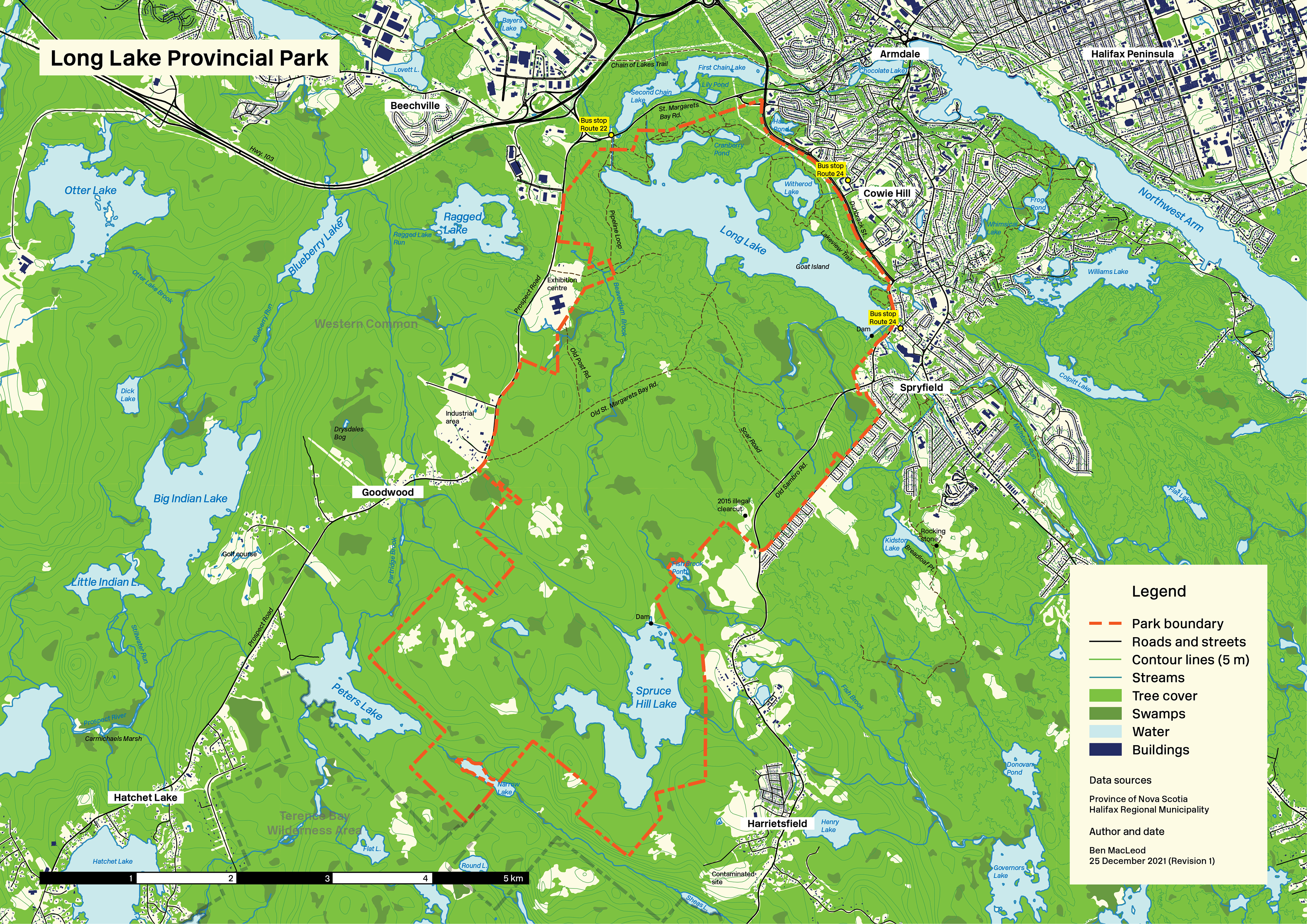
- Map of Long Lake Provincial Park

- Location within Nova Scotia
- Type: Provincial park
- Location: Halifax, Nova Scotia
- Area: 2,095 hectares (5,180 acres)
- Established: October 9, 1984
- Manager: Department of Natural Resources
- Public transit: Halifax Transit bus routes 22, 24, 123, 127

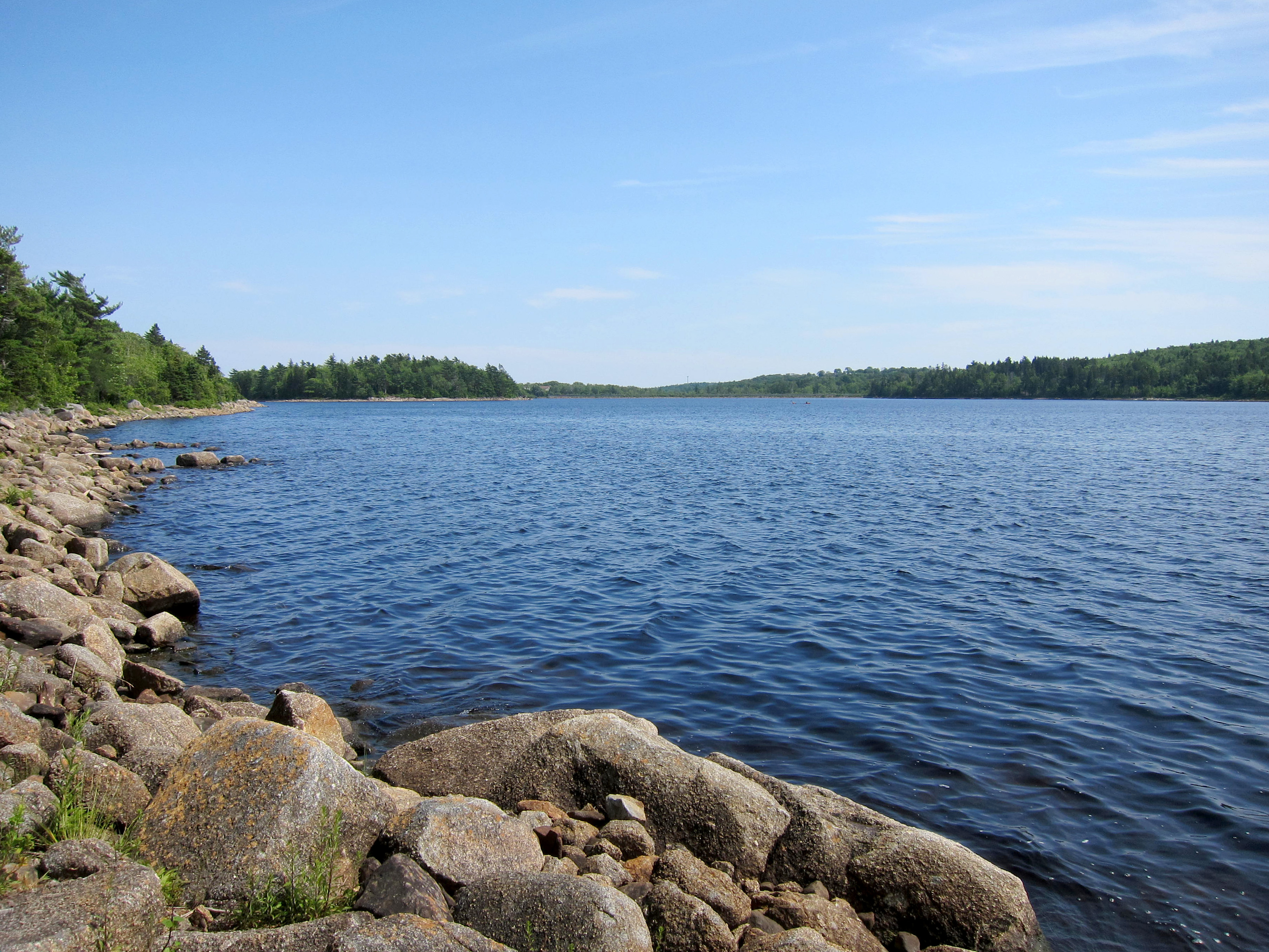
Long Lake

Long Lake Provincial Park is located in Halifax, Nova Scotia, Canada. It was initiated in 1981 by then Premier John Buchanan after Halifax's water supply had been shifted from the Spruce Hill/Long Lake/Chain Lakes watershed to the Pockwock Lake watershed near Hammonds Plains. The 2,095-hectare (5,180-acre) park, formally established in 1984, constitutes the bulk of these former watershed lands. Other portions were deeded to the municipality of Halifax, and the area around the Chain Lakes is still administered by the Halifax Regional Water Commission, since the Chain Lakes remain the city's emergency water supply.

== History ==
The lands included within the present park boundaries have had a long history of human use, including logging, several farms and many small granite quarries which provided the stones for many of the 19th century buildings in downtown Halifax. The entire area has been logged extensively in the early part of the 19th century, but a few scattered old growth trees remain.

Long Lake was central to the development of Halifax's water supply. Civil Engineer Charles Fairbanks surveyed the lakes around Halifax in 1845 and picked Long Lake as the best water supply for the city's first water system. In 1848, an earthen dam was constructed at the south end of the lake raising and greatly enlarging it. A canal, later replaced by a pipeline, connected Long Lake to the nearby Chain Lakes and formed Halifax's principle water supply. In 1869, Spruce Hill Lake, in the south part of the park was also dammed to provide water for another pipeline called "the hi-level pipeline" which supplied water to the higher parts in Halifax's North End. In 1877, the earthen dam was replaced a new and larger dam made of granite which raised the lake further. These formed the core of Halifax's water supply until 1977.

The north eastern side of Long lake formed an important road junction of the St. Margaret's Bay and Prospect bay roads leading to Halifax in the First World War and was fortified with trenches and machine gun emplacements. This fortification is known as Chain Lake Position - Locality 2

In order to protect the water quality, about 6,500 hectares (16,000 acres) of land was left "virtually untouched" into the 1970s. In the years leading up to the 1977 commissioning of the new Pockwock water supply system, concern began to mount over the fate of the old watershed lands, which were considered to have high ecological and recreational value. Residents feared that the area would be spoiled by suburban development.

A regional plan adopted in July 1975 proposed that the watershed lands would form one of seven new regional parks in the Halifax-Dartmouth area.

The 2,095-hectare (5,180-acre) watershed lands were acquired by the province in 1981 and put under the management of the Department of Natural Resources for use as a provincial park. Long Lake Provincial Park was formally created by Order in Council (OIC) 84-1189 on October 9, 1984, comprising part of the old watershed lands. Application was altered (by the withdrawal of 1.23 hectares (3.0 acres)) by OIC 93-364 on April 14, 1993.

== Management ==
Long Lake Provincial Park is controlled by the Department of Natural Resources (DNR) of the Government of Nova Scotia. It is managed in part by a non-profit community group, the Long Lake Provincial Park Association (LLPPA), founded in 1987. In 2003, DNR entered into consultation with LLPPA on the development of a park management plan which was completed in 2008 and subsequently adopted for park management purposes.

In early 2015, the Long Lake Provincial Park Association started to build accessible walking and cycling trails on the east side of the lake near Northwest Arm Drive (Dunbrack Street) in Spryfield. Known as the Lakeview Trail, these were constructed under a formal agreement between the association and the provincial government. There are now approximately 5.5 kilometres (3.4 mi) of wide multi-use trails that lie along the east side of Long Lake, together with a loop around Withrod Lake. Benches are installed along the trail and members of the public can have plaques installed on the benches. There is also a parking lot and a washroom across from the Cowie Hill Road. Another parking lot has been added along with a kayak/canoe launch at the location of the old pumphouse on Old Sambro Road across from Schnare Street.

On behalf of Bicycle Nova Scotia and the mountain bike community in general Randy Gray submitted a Mountain Biking Management Plan to be included either in the main body or as an appendix to the Management Plan. This was submitted after about six years of involvement and consultation with the Long Lake Park Association's Board of Directors and the Long Lake Park Association's Management Plan Committee. It can be read here: Mountain Bike Management Plan Submission. The Department of Natural Resources did not include this in its draft plan.

Long Lake has been designated by the Department of Natural Resources and Renewables as a "conservation-oriented" provincial park and can be viewed as an "urban wilderness", even though much of its area has been altered by previous human activities and uses. It is anticipated that no campgrounds or other high-impact projects will be developed in the park in the foreseeable future. This is in contrast to an aborted early plan to develop a resort area and artificial beach on the west side of Long Lake. An abandoned roadbed stretching part of the way between Long Lake and the Old Sambro Road is a residue of this earlier plan. Extensive erosion along part of this roadbed has resulted in a strip of exposed bedrock which has been dubbed the "scar road" and is easily visible from the air. Most of the park is designated as a "resource conservation zone" in the park's management plan. The plan also identified a wetland area as an environmental protection zone, while two small selected areas were designated for "resource development". One of these contains the canoe/kayak launch area near Schnare Street (described above) along with a short loop trail.

Long Lake Provincial Park Association managed the Lakeview Trail area under a 10-year agreement that expired in October 2025. This was replaced by a new, five-year agreement between DNR and the Spryfield Business Commission that came into effect in April 2026. LLPPA remains responsible for helping to manage the park as a whole.

== Location and access points ==
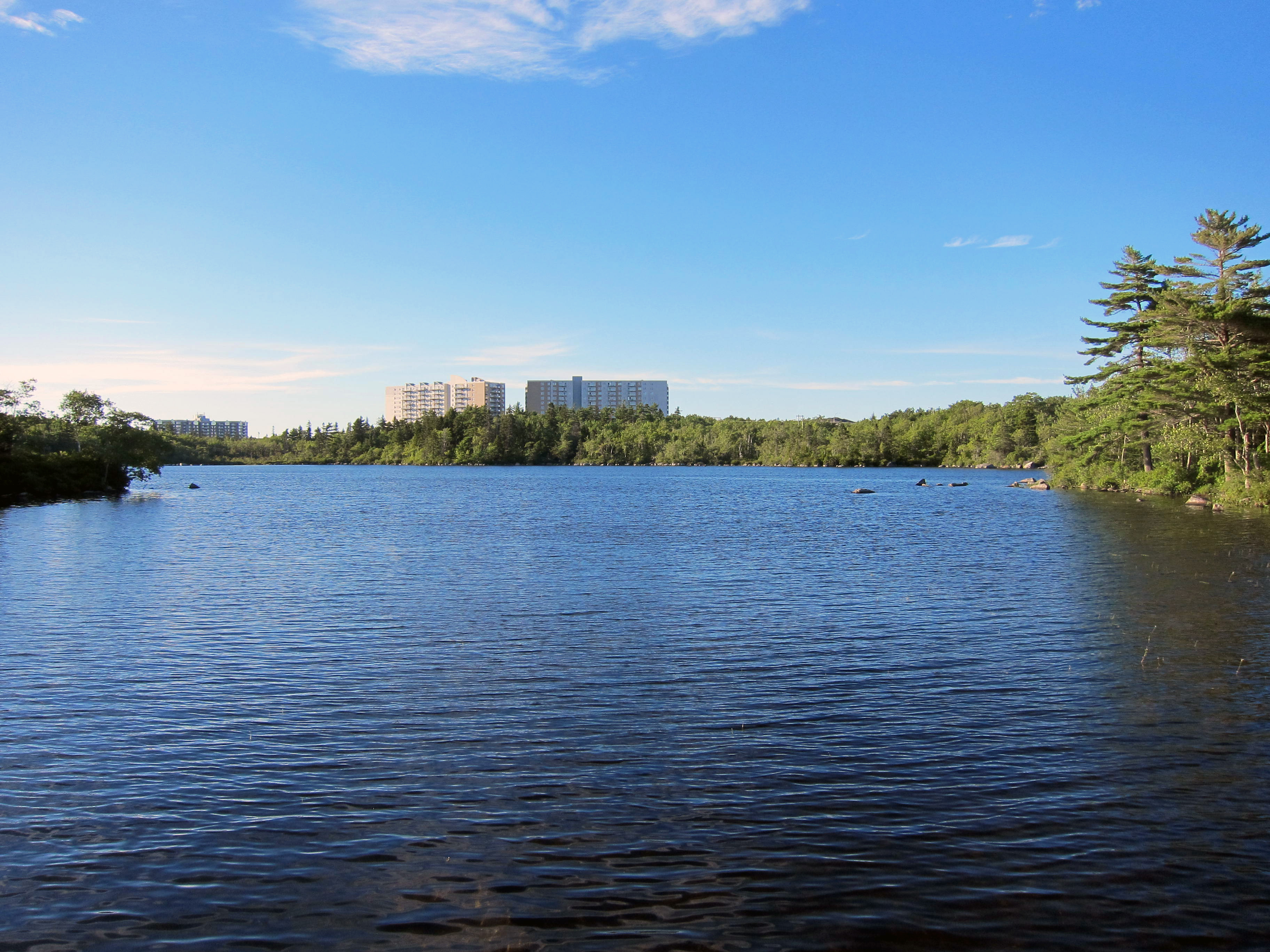
Witherod Lake, the third-largest water body in the park

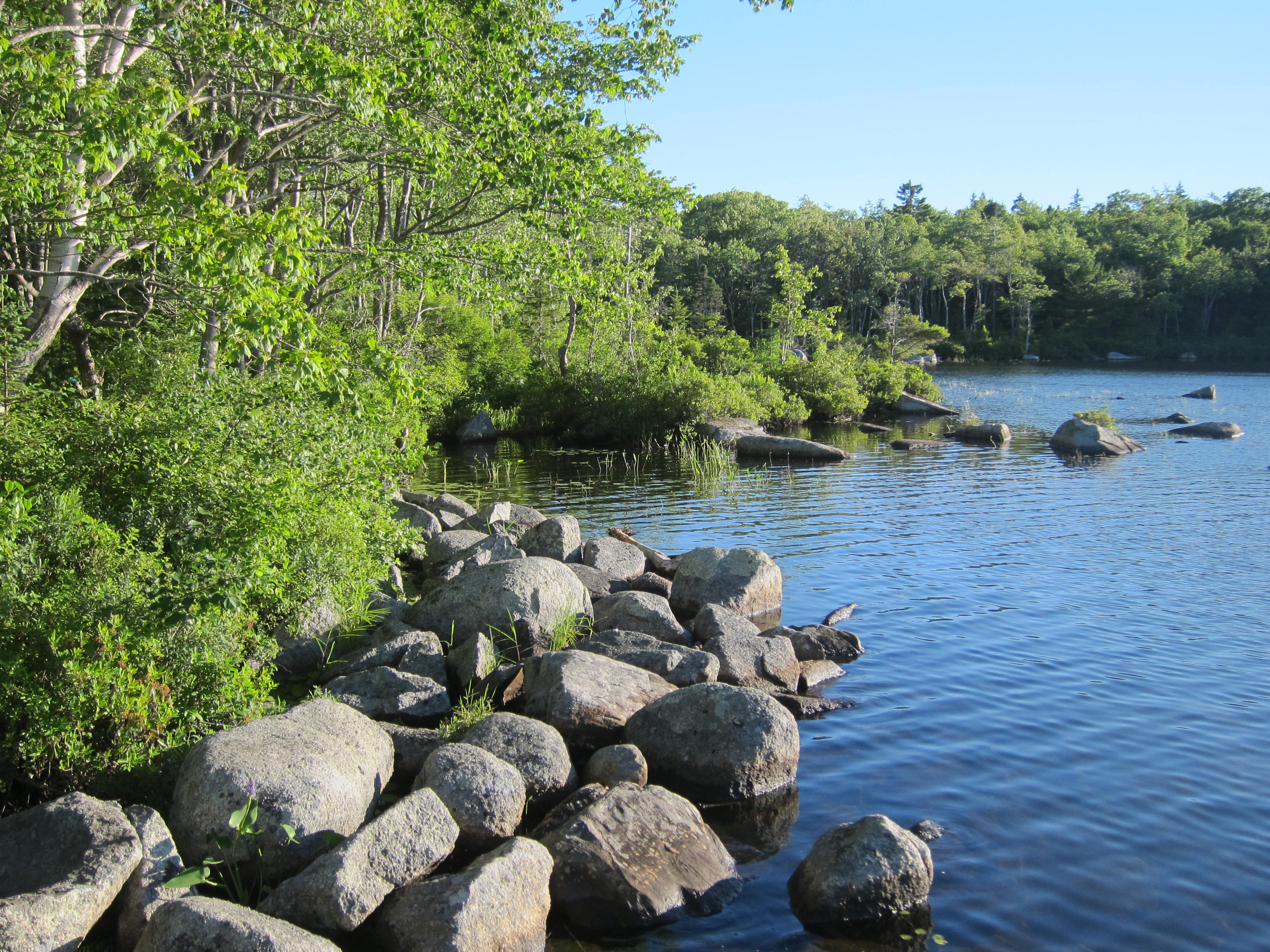
Southern shoreline of Witherod Lake

Long Lake Provincial Park is bordered by the Old Sambro Road on the east, Dunbrack Street (formerly Northwest Arm Drive) on the NE, Watershed Commission lands bisected by the St. Margaret's Bay Rd. on the north, Prospect Road on the west, and the Terence Bay Wilderness Area to the south. It can be viewed from:

- Dunbrack Street between the Spryfield exit on the St. Margeret's Bay Rd., and the Drive's termination on the Old Sambro Rd.,
- the Old Sambro Rd. between Dunbrack Street and its intersection with Leiblin Drive and
- from the Prospect Road, for a brief section just beyond Exhibition Park.

About 20 entrances to the park can be identified, including:

- several along the St. Margaret's Bay Rd. (including from the parking lot operated by Halifax Regional Municipality near the Prospect Rd. exit),
- 4 or 5 off Dunbrack Street, most notably the old road across from Peter Saulnier Drive, which goes past Withrod Lake to some of the more popular swimming spots on Long Lake,
- from two parking lots maintained by Long Lake Provincial Park Association situated on Dunbrack Street at Cowie Hill Road and at Old Sambro Road near Schnare Street,
- a path from the grassy area at the dam at the end of Dentith Rd.,
- an access road from Old Sambro Road to the south end of the dam on Long Lake,
- both ends of a now decommissioned old road (sometimes called The Old Coach Road) that ran from the Old Sambro Rd. to Goodwood,
- the Goodwood entrance has a path leading to Harrietsfield, past Spruce Hill Lake, but actually getting to Harrietsfield via this pathway is difficult because access to Harrietsfield is blocked by private property,
- the old road which goes from Harrietsfield to the Spruce Hill Lake dam,
- 2 or 3 paths which terminate on private property in Harrietsfield, and
- an old road going from the Exhibition Park to the Pipeline Trail (see below).

There is room along the roadside at a few of the more frequently used informal entrances for 2 to 4 vehicles. In addition, there are three parking lots: the one built by the Water Commission near the west end of Long Lake accessible from the St. Margaret's Bay Road, the relatively large lot maintained by the Long Lake Provincial Park Association off Dunbrack Street, and their smaller lot near Schnare Street. A canoe-kayak-paddle board launch area is associated with this smaller parking lot. The management plan had proposed that another parking lot be built off the Old Sambro Rd, but this component of the plan has been shelved. There has been discussion with the city for use of a portion of the Exhibition Park lands for parking in association with a major park access point there, as proposed in the park's management plan.

The northern portion of Long Lake Provincial Park (north of Long Lake itself) and the adjacent Water Commission lands between the park's boundaries and the St. Margaret's Bay Rd. is home to a network of informal narrow single-track mountain bike trails that is noteworthy for its challenging terrain. Many of the trails are organized into a series of loops (approximately 9.5 kilometres (5.9 mi) of trail) that can be ridden a number of ways. Most of these trails are unmarked and are generally inconsistent with the park's management plan. This northern hardwood-dominated portion of Long Lake Provincial Park receives most of the park's visitors.

== Hydrology ==
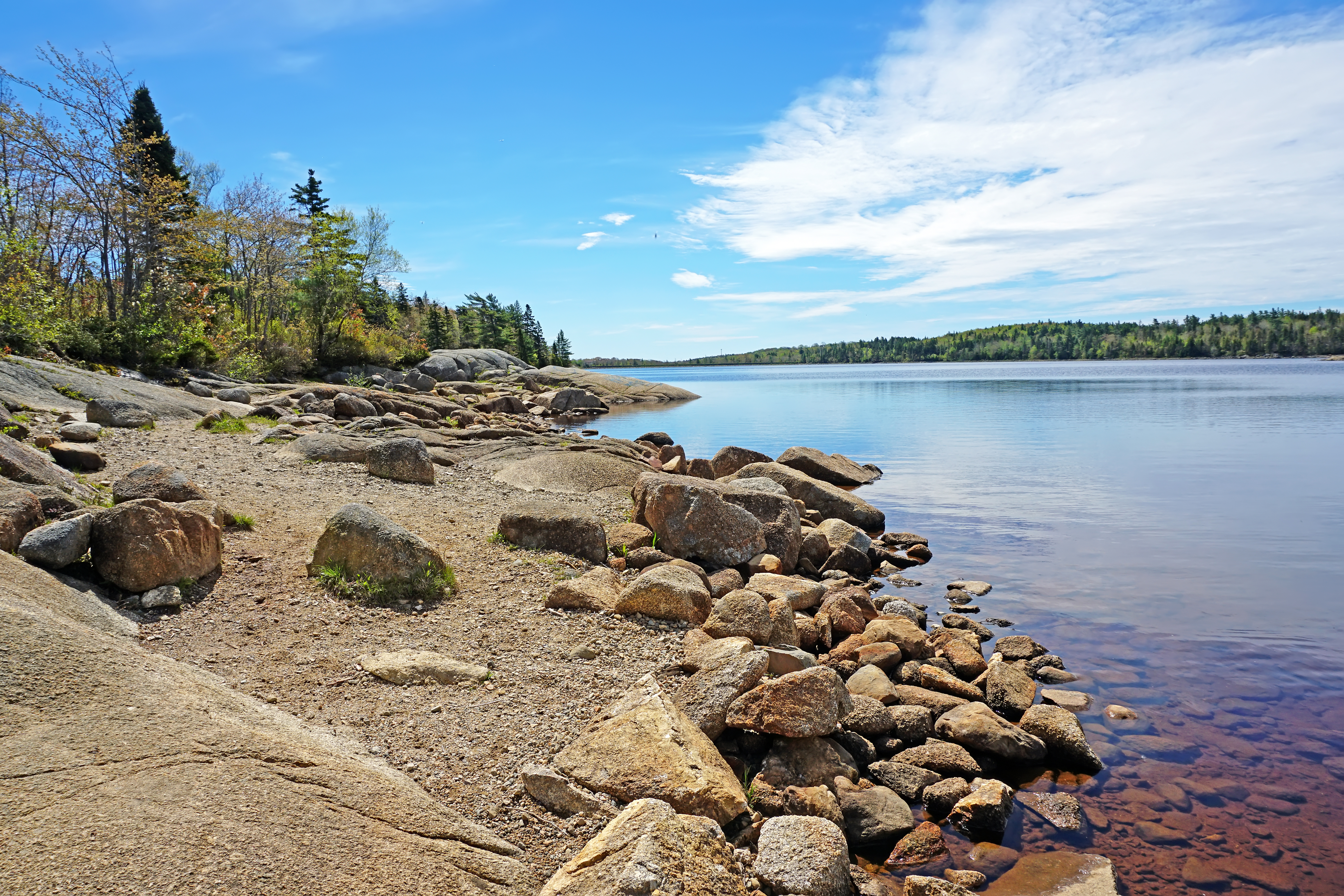
Long Lake Provincial Park in the spring of 2016

Long Lake Provincial Park is home to a number of lakes and ponds. The eponymous Long Lake, with an area of 154 hectares (380 acres), is the largest. It was created in the 19th century when a wooden dam was built on McIntosh Run, causing rising water levels to connect two pre-existing lakes, Cocked Hat Lake and Beaver Lake. The resultant Long Lake has a maximum depth of 30 metres.

The park's second-largest water body, Spruce Hill Lake, was formed in a similar manner. A dam was built on Spruce Lake in 1867, connecting it to nearby Fosses Hill Lake. Today, the resulting Spruce Hill Lake is 102 hectares (250 acres) large, and has a maximum depth of 12 metres.

Other lakes in the park include Witherod Lake (12 ha (30 acres)) and Narrow Lake (9 ha (22 acres)).

== Park usage ==
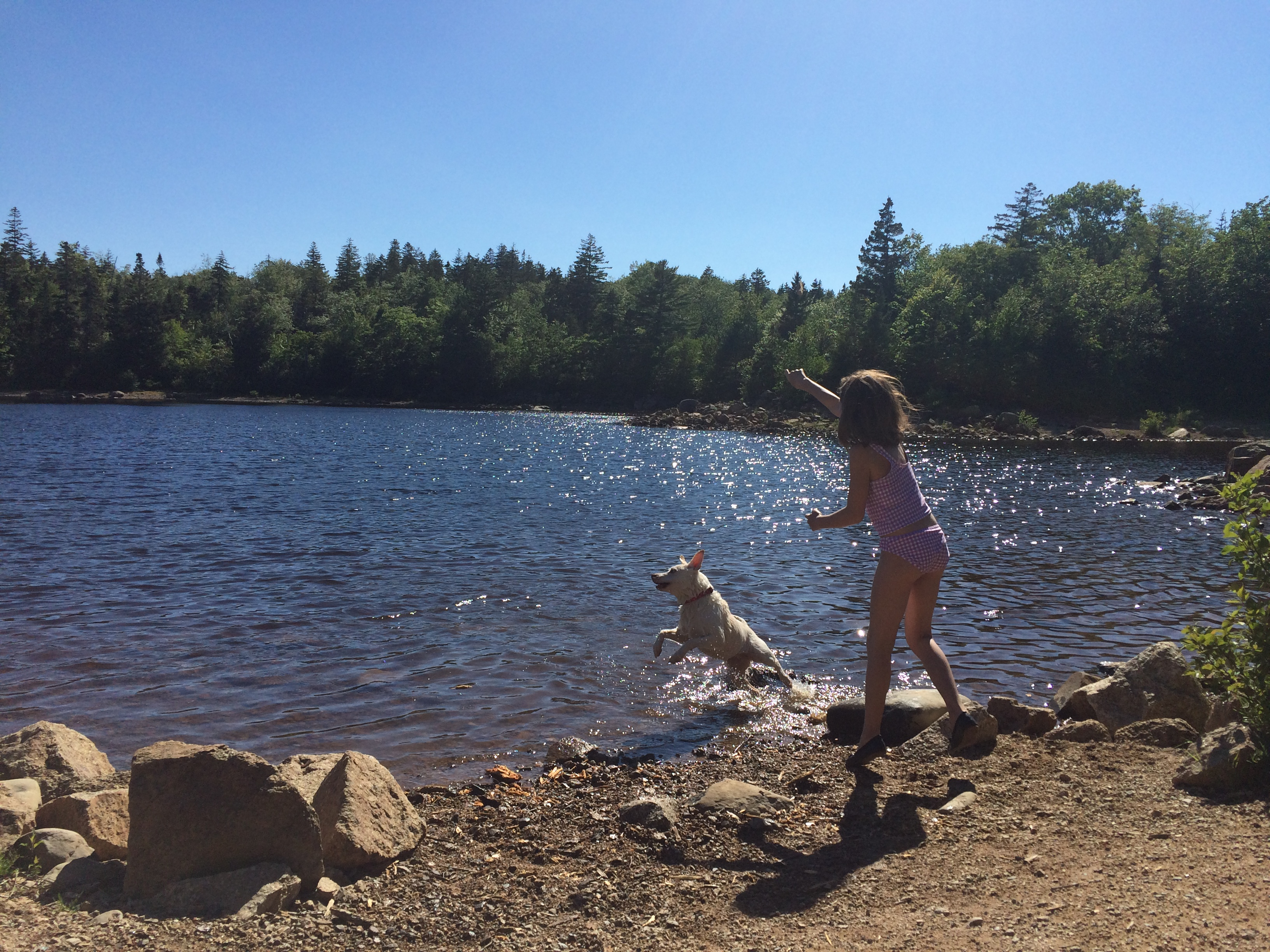
Child and dog playing in Long Lake

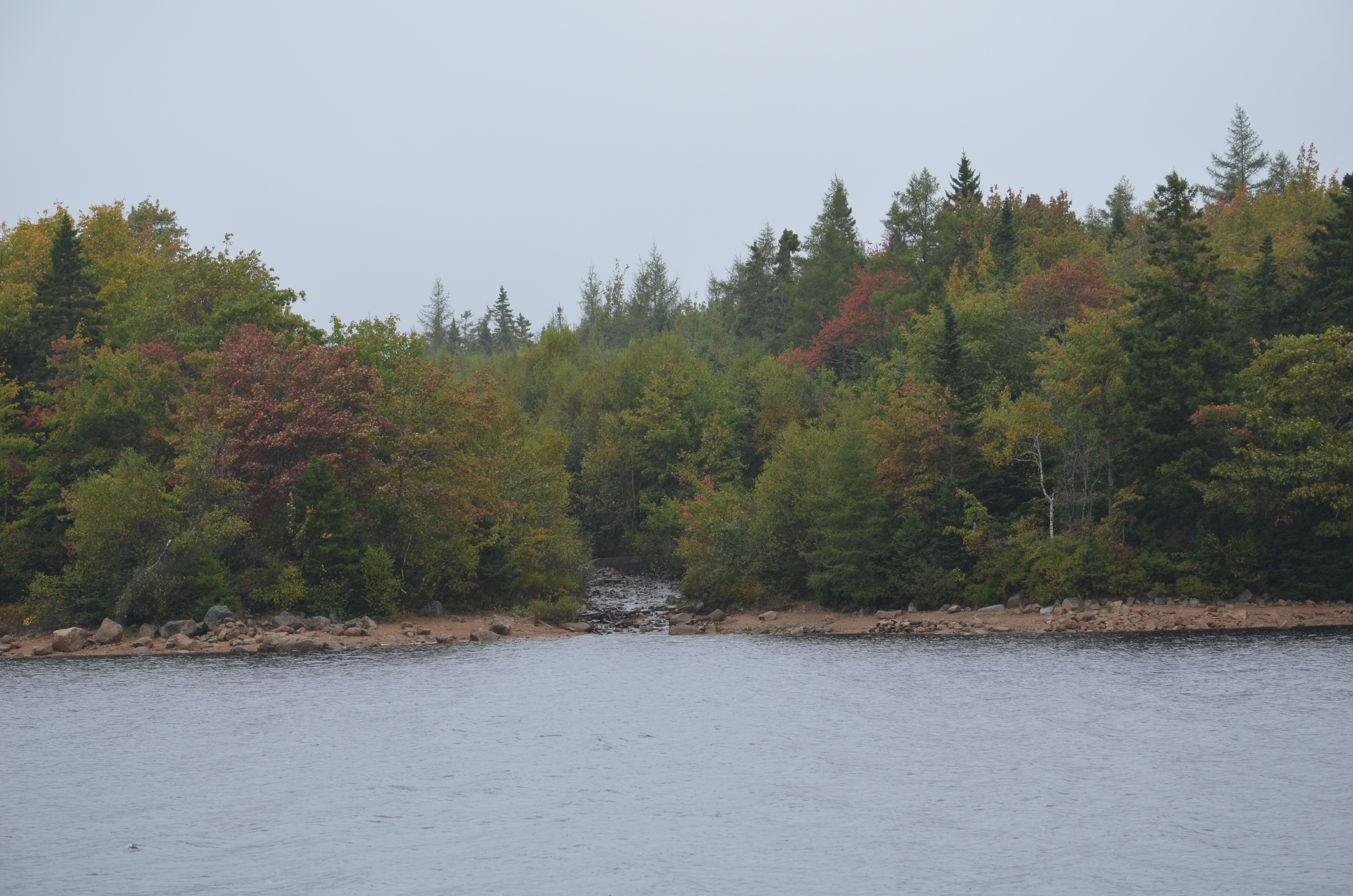
Long Lake in fall 2012

The park is used by a number of overlapping groups, including:

- Mountain bikers, who developed a trail system between 1994 and 1999. However, the number of bikers has declined significantly since about 2001, when trail systems began to be created elsewhere in the area.
- Hikers: folks simply out for a walk in the woods. Most hikers again use this same small northern portion of the park, but some make use of the older network of old roads and trails in the much larger portion south of Long Lake.
- Dog walkers: Walking dogs on leash along trails in the park is permitted under park regulations and this is a popular activity. Despite prohibition of unleashed dogs in provincial parks, Long Lake Provincial Park had been popular for off-leash dog walking in the Halifax area at one time. The activity was mostly in the area within 20-minutes walk of the parking lot on St. Margaret's Bay Road, mentioned above. The dog-walking pattern has evolved in recent years as a result of new trail development and greater awareness of provincial park regulations that prohibit this activity.
- Swimmers: Long Lake is deep, the water quality is excellent overall, and there are several good spots for swimming. As with other lakes in the region, the water is warm enough for swimming from June through September. Much of the swimming in the lake takes place in the small area discussed above (i.e. the portion north of Long Lake), plus there is a good swimming area just west of where a small stream known for its scenic waterfall enters the lake, near the southwest end. There is very limited trail access to the lake outside of this area, but for those adventurous enough two small sandy beaches offer secluded swimming on the south side. At the other end of the park, there is swimming spot on the earthen dam at the north end of Spruce Hill Lake, where Harrietsfield children swim.
- Cross-country skiers: most of these use the trails and old roads just north of Long Lake, though the old road linking Spryfield and Goodwood is also suitable.
- Geocaching: an active and long-established geocaching tradition exists in the Halifax region, and the area within the park is particularly popular, perhaps due to the varied terrain within park boundaries,
- fishers: the lake is not stocked, but it is reported that there is still good fishing from a few spots on the lake,
- Boaters in kayaks, paddle boards and canoes. This is not as popular an activity as it could be, due to the scarcity of boat-launching places. The new kayak launch on Old Sambro has helped improve this access. Use of motorized vehicles of any kind, including boats, is prohibited within park boundaries, as with other provincial parks in Nova Scotia, so park planners have not made provisions for an easy place to launch boats, out of concern that power boats might also be launched.
- Birdwatchers and other naturalists: the park's terrain is quite variable and there are many excellent habitats for bird watching. Access to many of the best habitats for birds is still limited, but this is seldom a barrier to the most eager of birders.
- Photography: The park offers a great wealth of opportunities for scenic and natural history photography, from scenic vistas around the lakes, to the many large glacial erratics (boulders dropped by the melting glaciers as they retreated, about 14,000 years ago), beautiful old trees, and a surprisingly wide variety of flora and fauna.
- Groups on organized field outings: Youth groups of various kinds, hiking clubs, cross-country runners, field naturalists, hiking associations, school groups and others often make use of the park's extensive trail system for outings of both the educational and recreational kinds.

In addition to the legal activities detailed above, illegal park uses include:

- Off-road vehicles: as discussed elsewhere, this activity occurs exclusively in the large southern portion of the park, and has caused considerable environmental harm, especially to wetlands.
- Hunting: This is not a serious problem in the park, fortunately, but it does occur nevertheless. Mostly, deer are the target of hunting in the area. Though, hunting is permitted on the Crown land outside of the park boundaries so long as legal safety distances are maintained.
- Trapping: Trap lines were occasionally reported in the park until around the year 2000, but not since then.
- Camping and squatting: This is a periodic problem, especially when trees are cut for firewood and for use in shelter and "camp" building. No camping is permitted within park boundaries, and no camp grounds are included in the current management plan.
- Evidence of many illegal campfires is provided by the numerous fire pits on the shores of Long Lake, and to a lesser extent at Withrod Lake.
- Party use, usually by youth: this is a serious problem because of the fire hazard involved, and because frequently used party spots become trampled clearings which both encourage future use and would take decades to recover if left alone. Litter and potential wildlife disturbance are also factors to consider, plus the safety hazards associated with parties in semi-remote areas involving extensive alcohol usage. The two largest islands in Long Lake and the island in Withrod Lake have been considerably damaged by party-related activities.
- In addition to litter left at party spots, there have been instances of deliberate dumping of wastes at the park's periphery where roads provide access to places that are hidden from view.
- Marijuana growing: Not a serious or widespread problem, but over the years a number of small plots of marijuana have been found within park boundaries.
- Off-leash dog walking and dog walkers refusing to pick up after their pets.
- There has been at least one instance of illegal logging within the park (see below).

== Environmental challenges ==
Like most other parks in Halifax, it suffered extensive tree-loss as a result of Hurricane Juan on September 29, 2003. Many paths were blocked and some of the less-used ones remain that way. Most have since been cleared by citizens, however, since the province does not actively manage this provincial park. The slash created by these downed trees, which include many mature large, mature spruce trees, has created a significant fire hazard, although to date this has not created a problem and is typical of natural forests in the region.

As mentioned elsewhere in the article, many of the more often used trails suffer from extensive erosion, and some have become quite wide because of people avoiding wet areas or creating short-cuts.

Water quality is good overall, but is affected somewhat by runoff from the nearby Bayers Lake Industrial Park, and locally, by off-leash dogs swimming in the lake.

In the large southern region of the park, extensive damage has been done by all-terrain vehicles, especially in boggy areas and along trails. This is an ongoing problem which will hopefully be remediated via education and more vigorous enforcement of regulations.

In November 2015, around 3.8 hectares (9.4 acres) of land within the park was illegally clearcut by a private company. Resourcetec Inc. was hired by Dexter Construction to cut trees on property owned by Dexter along Old Sambro Road, beside the park. Resourcetec subcontracted the work to Scott and Stewart Forestry Consultants, who accidentally cut down trees on Crown land. Resourcetec was alleged to be the most culpable party. The company pleaded guilty and was fined in 2016. In response to this incident, provincial fines against illegal cutting on Crown land were significantly increased in November 2016.

== Flora and fauna ==
Habitats within the park are extremely varied, and include various kinds of wetlands, old-growth vegetative successions from areas previously farmed, an area planted with pine trees by the Boy Scouts in the 1960s, extensive barrens in the southwestern portion of the park, some mixed hardwood/softwood and predominantly hardwood (oak, beech, witch hazel, birch, red maple) areas in the small northern part of the park discussed above, and extensive areas of boreal forest in the SE region - largely red and black spruce, balsam fir and red maple. As with most parts of Nova Scotia, large, old white pines dot the park, being left over from the logging which most areas underwent before their designation as watershed lands. It is worth noting that healthy populations of orchids can be found in some of the marshy portions in the park.

The park's fauna is healthy and varied and includes many deer, the occasional moose, multitudes of squirrels, snowshoe hares, foxes, bobcats, chipmunks, three or four species of frogs and salamanders, many fish and bird species, beavers (who have extensively altered portions of the park), muskrats, snakes and others. Unverified reports of lynx tracks and spoor also exist. Bears have not been reported within the park in recent years.

== Trails ==
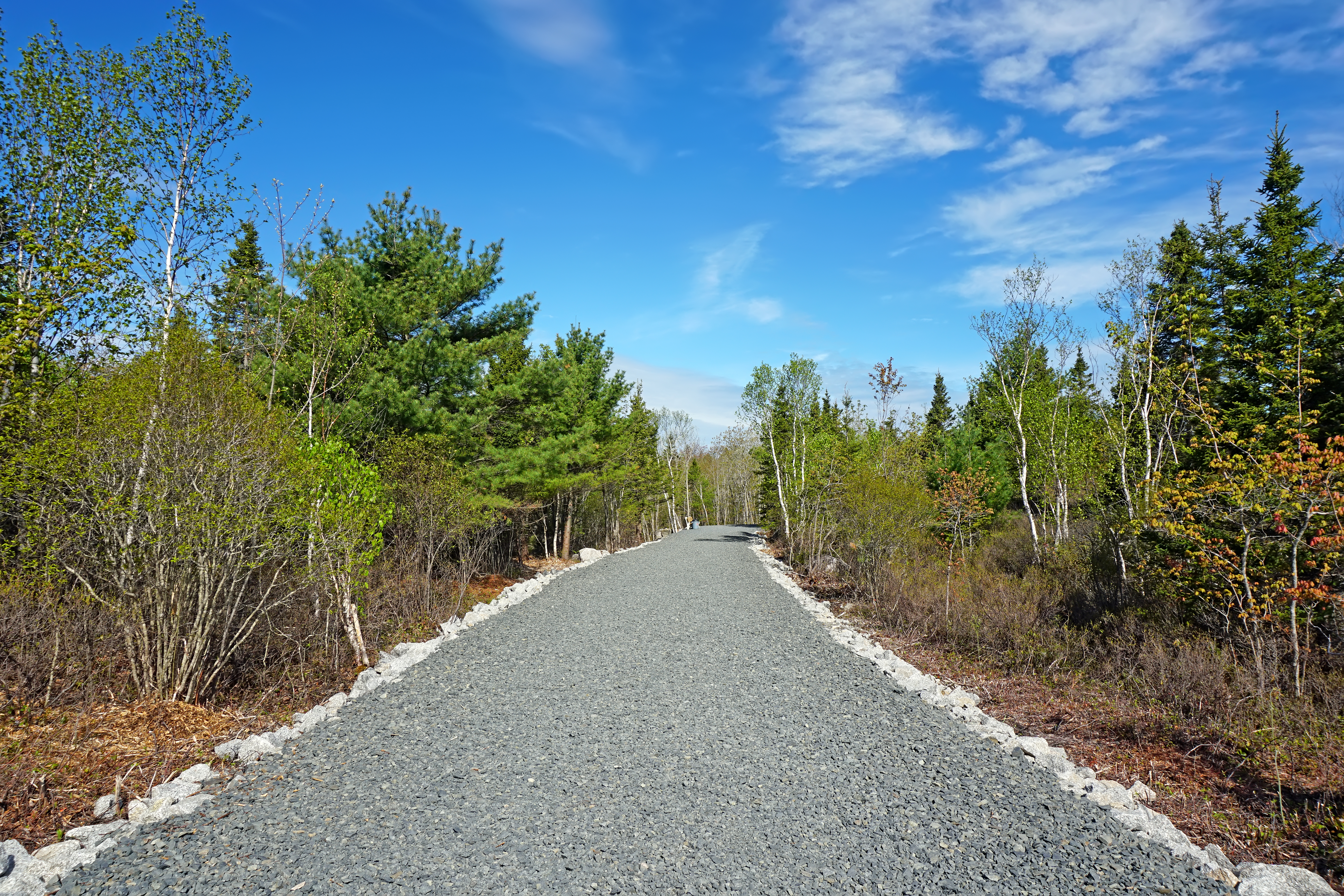
Lakeview Trail, pictured shortly after its 2016 opening

The park possesses an extensive trail system comprising:

- old roads associated with the farms in the area, including one connecting the Old Sambro Rd. in Spryfield, and Goodwood (on the Prospect Rd.), and another from Goodwood to Harrietsfield,
- The "pipeline trail" which follows the "Hi-level Pipeline" from Spruce Hill Lake. The lower portion of the pipeline forms a popular trail leading from the north end of Long Lake to a waterfrall on Beaver Dam Brook. The upper portion of the pipeline has become flooded and swampy in recent years and is generally impassable,
- Older trails associated with habitation, watershed usage, quarries and general uses such as fishing, swimming, berry picking, hiking and hunting and
- Newer trails developed by mountain bikers, as discussed above. Many of the more extensively used trails suffer from erosional problems, and various remedial proposals including trail closures have been discussed as part of the creation of the park's development plan. However, the majority of the damage to the trails occurred during the drop of mountain bike use and the increase in hiker/dog walker traffic.
- A new 5.5-kilometre (3.4 mi) trail system on the northeast side of the park, called the Lakeview Trail, opened on Earth Day in 2016. It includes washrooms, benches, a car park, and bicycle racks. The trail system can be accessed at three points on Dunbrack Street and three points on Old Sambro Road The trails were funded by a private developer building a subdivision on the opposite side of Dunbrack Street.
