= Sambro Head, Nova Scotia =

Coordinates: 44°29′5.1″N 63°34′59.1″W

Sambro Head in Nova Scotia

Sambro Head is a community of the Halifax Regional Municipality, Nova Scotia located between Ketch Harbour and Sambro on the Chebucto Peninsula on Nova Scotia Route 349.

== Economy ==
Canadian Maritime Engineering operates a small shipyard in Sambro Head maintaining mostly smaller vessels but the yard was originally responsible for repairs to CCGS Corporal McLaren M.M.V..
