= Long Pond (Herring Cove, Nova Scotia) =

Pond in Nova Scotia, Canada

- Location within Nova Scotia
- Coordinates: 44.5774°N 63.5776°W

Long Pond is a lake in Windsor, Nova Scotia, Canada. It is used both for swimming in the summer and skating in the winter. The lake is famous for being the “birthplace of hockey." Long ago, children from Windsor, Nova Scotia created the game now known as hockey and played it at Long Pond. The lake now holds the annual Long Pond Heritage Classic tournament.
