= Harrietsfield, Nova Scotia =

Coordinates: 44°34′10″N 63°38′04″W

Harrietsfield in Nova Scotia

Harrietsfield is a rural residential community in the Western region of the Halifax Regional Municipality in district 18 on the Chebucto Peninsula on the Old Sambro Road (Route 306), 10 kilometers from Downtown Halifax.

== History ==
The community is named after the wife of Colonel William Thompson, who lived in the area in the 1780s. In 1790, Casper Gruber arrived, followed by nine other families by 1827. The community's population has slowly increased because of easy access to Halifax via the Old Sambro Road.

== Notable places ==
- Earth Station Telesat Canada
- RDM Recycling

== Communications ==
- Telephone exchange 902 - 479
- First three digits of postal code - B3V
- Internet - Cable- Eastlink

== Demographics ==
- Total Population - 849
- Total Dwellings - 327
- Total Land Area - 9.1977 km^{2}

== Parks ==
- Long Lake Provincial Park

== Schools ==
- Harrietsfield Elementary School
