= Chocolate Lake =

Lake in Halifax, Nova Scotia, Canada

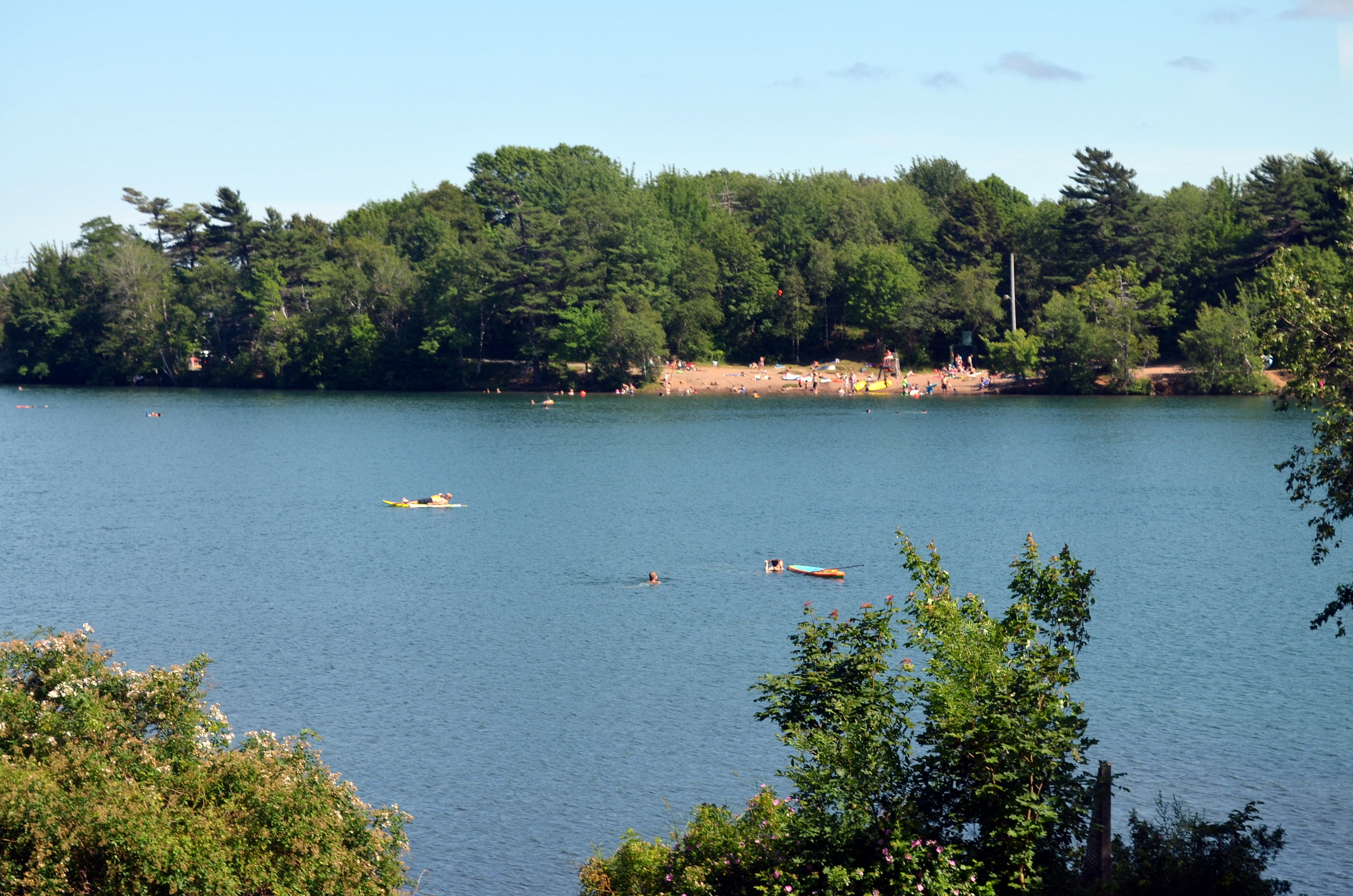
- Chocolate Lake, including city beach

- Location within Nova Scotia
- Location: Halifax, Nova Scotia
- Coordinates: 44°38′19.9″N 63°37′19.9″W
- Type: Artificial
- Surface elevation: 25 m (82 ft)
- Settlements: Armdale, Halifax

Chocolate Lake is located in the Armdale neighbourhood of Halifax, Nova Scotia. The lake is surrounded by many private homes as well as a Best Western hotel and a city beach. As one of the nearest freshwater lakes to Downtown Halifax, Chocolate Lake is popular with swimmers and families during the summer months.

Chocolate Lake has turtles, muskrats, and catfish. Although it is cited as contaminated, the City of Halifax tests the water quality periodically and the beach has rarely been closed for high levels of bacteria. Chocolate Lake is sourced by the Chain of Lakes, which is Halifax’s backup water supply.

In the summer months, the beach is patrolled by lifeguards from 11:00 am to 6:00 pm; at least six deaths have been attributed to Chocolate Lake in roughly the past two decades. Chocolate Lake is often miscited as an old quarry, confused with the King's and Queen's quarries found in Purcell's Cove. The city also provides changing rooms and washrooms. Other facilities near the beach include a tennis court, basketball courts, and a children's playground. There is a municipally-run Chocolate Lake Recreation Centre on the opposite side of Herring Cove Road.

Chocolate Lake is referenced in the Jenn Grant song titled "Dreamer" at approximately 1:52.

== Transport ==
Chocolate Lake is within walking distance of the urban West End, Quinpool District, and Armdale, as well as many suburban neighbourhoods in Halifax, and is accessible via Halifax Transit routes 9A/9B and 24. It also has a small parking lot off Melwood Avenue.
