= Portuguese Cove, Nova Scotia =

Community in Nova Scotia, Canada

Coordinates: 44°31′18.8″N 63°32′6.9″W

Portuguese Cove in Nova Scotia

Portuguese Cove is a rural community in the Halifax Regional Municipality, Nova Scotia on Route 349 on the Chebucto Peninsula.

== History ==
The name comes from the Portuguese fishermen who for many years sailed in the summer months fishing in the 18th century. During the War of 1812, the community received the 133 passengers from the wreck of HMS Atalante. A local fishing vessel discovered the passengers in three small vessels stranded in the fog and guided them to safety at Portuguese Cove. Captain Hickey reported, the "inhabitants of Portuguese cove behaved towards us all with every possible mark of hospitality, kindness, and attention, that humanity could dictate."
