= Rockingham, Nova Scotia =

Rockingham
- Community
- Location within Nova Scotia
- Coordinates: 44°40′14″N 63°38′30″W
- Country: Canada
- Province: Nova Scotia
- Municipality: Halifax
- Community: Rockingham
- Municipal District: District 10 (Halifax-Bedford Basin West)

Area
  - Total: 1.99 km^{2} (0.77 sq mi)
- Telephone Exchanges: 782, 902
- GNBC code: CAHFL

Rockingham is a community located within the urban area of the Halifax Regional Municipality, in Nova Scotia, Canada.

== History ==
The first Europeans to settle in what was to become Rockingham were foreign Protestant farmers and innkeepers, starting in 1784. While the inns were too close to the city to benefit from stage coach traffic, they were conveniently located for drovers bringing their livestock to the Halifax market. Drovers lodged at the inns and kept their animals in the pastures while they arranged for their sale and slaughter.

In the 1840s, William Evens and William Davey bought properties on the western shore of the basin. Evens, a butcher, built a slaughterhouse, while Davey established a large inn called the Four Mile House. When the Nova Scotia Railway was being built the two men persuaded the railway board to locate the first stop at Four Mile House. On 1 February 1855, the first ceremonial run of the Nova Scotia Railway came to Four Mile House. The village that grew up around the railway station took the name "Four Mile House".

The construction of the Nova Scotia Railway in 1855 altered the character of the community. Destruction of the shoreline cut off farmers from some resources, but eventually the railway helped the village to grow and prosper. Country life was now easily accessible; wealthy families built grand summer homes and transient visitors enjoyed staying at the Wayside Inn (formerly the Five Mile House) and other tourist accommodations in Rockingham.

The Four Mile House district was selected by the Roman Catholic Sisters of Charity of Saint Vincent de Paul (Halifax) in the early 1870s for a convent and institution of higher learning. Mount Saint Vincent was built up the hill on a large parcel of land almost directly opposite the Nova Scotia Railway station. In 1873, the convent, along with its women's finishing school, Mount Saint Vincent Academy and associated residence facilities opened after approximately one year of construction.

In 1886, the residents of the Four Mile House district decided their community needed a name that better reflected its growing prosperity. The name Rockingham Station was inspired by the Rockingham Inn that had been located 3 km (1.9 mi) north at Prince's Lodge. This particular inn had burned down in 1833, but lived on in memory due to its links with Lieutenant Governor Sir John Wentworth, Prince Edward, Duke of Kent and Strathearn, and Charles Watson-Wentworth, 2nd Marquess of Rockingham, a powerful English noble and friend of the Wentworths.

The Intercolonial Railway, which had taken over the Nova Scotia Railway, expropriated waterfront land at Rockingham Station from the Sisters of Charity during the early 1900s to widen its trackage leading to Fairview. Immediately prior to the Halifax Explosion, telegraph operator Vince Coleman (train dispatcher) managed to warn an incoming passenger train to hold at Rockingham Station's passenger station (the last Intercolonial Railway station stop before Richmond terminal), ultimately saving countless lives. The new rock cut being built for the railway through south end Halifax was finished in 1918 under the newly created Canadian National Railways, with some of the blasted rock being used as infill to create the Halifax Ocean Terminals in the south end of the city, as well as infill of Bedford Basin off Rockingham Station to create what is now the Rockingham Railway Yard.

In 1925, Mount St. Vincent Academy was upgraded in status to a women's junior college. The community of Rockingham Station began to experience some subdivision of land as it was located in a cheaper tax jurisdiction (the Municipality of the County of Halifax) as opposed to the adjacent city which ended at Fairview.

On 5 April 1961, the village's name was formally simplified by the provincial government to just Rockingham.

The creation of Bicentennial Drive, an all-weather bypass highway to Bedford, likely spurred construction of the first major subdivision developments in 1962, although much of the Rockingham area on the hillside overlooking Bedford Basin would require significant blasting to create streets and underground services. Mount St. Vincent College was upgraded to a full university, named Mount St. Vincent University, in 1966. Many homes that faced the original road, had to move or be renovated as the entrances no longer faced the street.

On 1 January 1969, the community of Rockingham--as well as Prince's Lodge, Armdale, Clayton Park, Fairview, and Spryfield--were annexed into the City of Halifax.

Rockingham continued to benefit from being located immediately north of the peninsular city on the Highway 102 corridor to Bedford and beyond. The opening of the A. Murray MacKay Bridge in 1970 led to improved connections between Rockingham to the City of Dartmouth and particularly a new industrial park named Burnside which would become a major regional employer. A smaller industrial park named Bayers Lake was also built near Rockingham on the west side of Highway 102. New residential developments in the expanding city were subsequently built near Rockingham; such as the Clayton Park subdivision, located along the eastern slope of Geizer's Hill.

During the 1970s-and-1980s, CN Rail--and later Via Rail--operated a form of commuter rail passenger service on the railway line along Bedford Basin into downtown Halifax using frequently scheduled Budd Diesel Rail Cars which were destined for exurban destinations, suburban destinations, and farther-afield destinations. Rockingham's station was closed after the 15 January 1990 budget cuts to Via Rail saw these services discontinued. The Bedford Highway was redeveloped during the mid 1990s into a major collector road from Birch Cove into the city.

On 1 April 1996, Halifax County was dissolved and all of its places (cities, suburbs, towns, and villages) were turned into communities of a single-tier municipality called the Halifax Regional Municipality. Subsequently, Rockingham was turned into a community within the new Halifax Regional Municipality.

Preceding and following amalgamation, subdivision development in the western part of Rockingham continued apace, spurred in particular by the opening of Dunbrack Street and Northwest Arm Drive, however the most significant period of recent growth in Rockingham occurred between 1997-and-2003 with the Clayton Park West subdivision which was a 20-year development that filled within a quarter of the budgeted timeframe. Clayton Park West became one of the fastest-growing, densest new developments in Nova Scotian urban history. The rapid development was spurred by the conversion of the Bayers Lake Industrial Park into a business park (Bayers Lake Business Park) model containing Halifax's first big box outlet stores, as well as new highway interchange construction between Lacewood Drive and Highway 102.

Today, as the Halifax area grows at a strong pace, Rockingham continues to diversify and urbanize.

== Geography ==
The Halifax Regional Municipality Urban Forest Master Plan of 2013 splits Rockingham into two-sections; Rockingham East--and--Rockingham West. Rockingham East has a landmass of 94 ha (230 acres), and Rockingham West has a landmass of 105 ha (260 acres). Rockingham's total landmass is 199 ha (490 acres).

Rockingham is situated on the western shore of the Bedford Basin. It is located north-north-east of Clayton Park and Fairview, and south of Bedford; specifically, Birch Cove and Prince's Lodge. Its eastern extent is formed by the shore of the Bedford Basin and its western extent is generally the top of the ridge that rises from the Bedford Basin, although this was subsequently extended westward to an area near the Birch Cove Lakes and Highway 102.

== Transportation ==
A major thoroughfare, Highway 2 (the Bedford Highway), provides residents of Rockingham a route to exurban, suburban, and rural communities further-afield to the north. Additionally, it provides residents of Rockingham to more urban communities within the municipality.

== Education ==
All public schools within Rockingham are administered by the Halifax Regional Centre for Education.

Elementary Schools

- Duc d'Anville Elementary
- Grosvenor-Wentworth Park Elementary
- Park West School
- Rockingham Elementary

High Schools

- Halifax West High School

Junior High Schools

- Clayton Park Junior High
- Park West School

Universities

- Mount St. Vincent University
