= Williamswood, Nova Scotia =

Community in Nova Scotia, Canada

Coordinates: 44°31′16.8″N 63°38′29″W

Williamswood in Nova Scotia

Williamswood is a community of the Halifax Regional Municipality in the Canadian province of Nova Scotia. The community is currently represented by Liberal MLA, Brendan Maguire.
