= Purcells Cove =

Community within the Halifax Regional Municipality, Nova Scotia

Coordinates: 44°36′46″N 63°34′30″W

Purcells Cove in Nova Scotia

Purcells Cove is a community within the Halifax Regional Municipality, Nova Scotia, Canada, on the west side of Halifax Harbour from the Northwest Arm to Fergusons Cove along Route 253.

The first three characters of the postal code in the area are B3P.

Purcells Cove has historically been an important location for the quarrying of granite, ironstone, and slate. In her book, Purcell's Cove: The Little Place that Helped Build Halifax City, Elsie Millington explains how important Purcells Cove was for the building of Halifax. Many buildings in downtown Halifax including the Citadel, the historic Halifax Town Clock, the walls of the Grand Parade, and the old post office used stone produced by quarries at Purcells Cove. The railroad in the granite quarry is thought to be the first constructed anywhere in Eastern Canada.

Purcells Cove is named after Bill Purcell who ferried people to and from Halifax in the 1940s.
