= Herring Cove =

Suburban and former fishing community in Nova Scotia, Canada

Coordinates: 44°34′13″N 63°34′06″W

Herring Cove in Nova Scotia

Herring Cove (2006 pop.: 2,790) is a Canadian suburban and former fishing community in Nova Scotia's Halifax Regional Municipality. It is situated on the eastern shore of the Chebucto Peninsula, 15 km (9.3 mi) south of Downtown Halifax. It is near the western approaches to Halifax Harbour, and can be reached both via Purcell's Cove along the coastal road and from inland via the Herring Cove Road through Spryfield. There are two schools in Herring Cove, William King Elementary and Herring Cove Junior High. The community is also home to a small variety of small businesses and programs.

It is notable as the landing point for several transatlantic communications cables including the fastest connectivity between London, England, and New York City.

== History ==
The cove was called "Moolipchugechk" by the indigenous Miꞌkmaq people, meaning a narrow and deep chasm or valley. Michael O'Power was granted a 90-hectare land grant in 1749 on the eastern side of Herring Cove. John Salusbury owned a 130 acres (53 ha) estate there in 1750, renting land to an early settler named Henry Lather. Salusbury sold his estate within a few years. European settlement occurred in earnest in the late 1700s. Many current residents are the descendants of original Irish-Catholic settlers to the area.

In 1777, during the American Revolution, eleven fishermen from Herring Cove captured seven American privateers. The privateers were making their way back to New England in a shallop after the American ship Hope destroyed their vessel off the coast of Canso. The fishermen were given a reward for their valour.

On November 24, 1797, the frigate HMS Tribune ran aground on nearby shoals. Only 12 of the ship's 250 passengers and crew survived. The rescue was orchestrated by Joe Cracker, a 13-year-old Herring Cove resident, who rallied the community to the ship's aid and rescued the first two passengers in his small dory. There is a monument to Cracker at nearby Tribune Head which is named after the wreck. A schoolgirl at the time of the original monument dedication, Margaret Alice (Sullivan) Power recited the story of the Tribune to all who attended and again recited from memory the same poetic verse story at a re-dedication in 1996 at age 82.

Early surveyor's maps list the community as Dunk Cove, named for George Montagu-Dunk, 2nd Earl of Halifax, also the namesake of the nearby city. Some years prior to establishment of Halifax in 1749, the waters of Halifax Harbour and the outer bay were surveyed by two brothers with the surname Herring who were stationed at the cove during the survey period. The present name has may have been incorrectly attributed to either the surname of early settlers, or the abundance of herring in the cove.

The narrow, but deep and sheltered, cove hosted 25 commercial fishing boats at its peak, operating out of a small government wharf and private jetties and fish sheds. However, the last working fisherman, Reg Dempsey, retired in 2018. Some retired fishermen still keep their boats in the cove for recreation. Former fishing wharves and sheds are now used for small recreational boats.

As an unincorporated rural community, Herring Cove was part of the Municipality of the County of Halifax until April 1, 1996, when all municipalities in the county were amalgamated into the Halifax Regional Municipality (HRM). Today, Herring Cove's economy is dictated not by the fishery, but by its proximity to the HRM's urban core as a bedroom community. Several subdivisions have been built in recent decades (since about 1980), leading to the decision by the Halifax Regional Water Commission in February 2007 to extend municipal water and sanitary sewage service to the area.

=== Underwater cables ===
As of 2000, undersea connections in Herring Cove connected it with Europe via a 5,500 km (3,400 mi) cable to Liverpool, another 5,600 km (3,500 mi) cable to Dublin, to Boston via a 750 km (470 mi) cable. As of 2012 Hibernia Atlantic will add direct connections to London and New York City for a total distance of 6,012 km (3,736 mi), about 11% more than the great circle route absolute minimum of 5,583 km (3,469 mi). The 2,800 m^{2} (30,000 ft^{2}) cable landing station at Hospital Point on Herring Cove remains the densest cluster of sub-70 millisecond (ms) connectivity on the north Atlantic, the critical link on cables that connect the English speaking world's financial centres.

In the late 1990s, the Hibernia Atlantic trans-Atlantic communications cable project landed its western terminus at Herring Cove at Hospital Point. In 2000, Worldwide Telecom Canada Inc., a subsidiary of Vancouver-based Worldwide Fiber Inc., built its 2,800 m^{2} (30,000 ft^{2}) cable landing station. In 2010, successor Hibernia Atlantic expanded the facility for new cables including a 59 ms cable connecting London to New York City that was expected to enter service in 2012 and to provide a strategic speed advantage to financial trading.

== Events ==
Popular events include the annual Herring Cove Polar Bear Dip, which celebrated its 25th anniversary in 2019. Swimmers jump from Government Wharf into the frigid Atlantic waters on New Years Day, raising money for a local charity. Ron James and Rick Mercer participated in the 2011 jump, filming a segment for the Rick Mercer Report.

== Notable people ==
- Shane Bowers, professional ice hockey player.
- Archbishop James Martin Hayes, Roman Catholic Archbishop of Halifax from 1967 to 1990 who participated in the Second Vatican Council.

== Setting ==
The community is at the intersection of Route 253 and Route 349, local roads servicing the southeastern side of the Chebucto Peninsula.

There are several hiking trails in the community; one begins at 'Hayes's garden's' (accessible from the coast road leading to Purcell's Cove) to "The Monument" and has become a popular place to picnic, and features a splendid view of the Atlantic. This area is N.S. Provincial Park lands. At the highest point on the cliffs (30 m (98 ft) above sea level), there are two stone monuments constructed of granite boulders in memory of George Brown, a Canadian and Olympic rowing athlete. The look-off also affords a panoramic view of the entrance to Halifax Harbour north to Halifax and east to Eastern Passage.

== Gallery ==
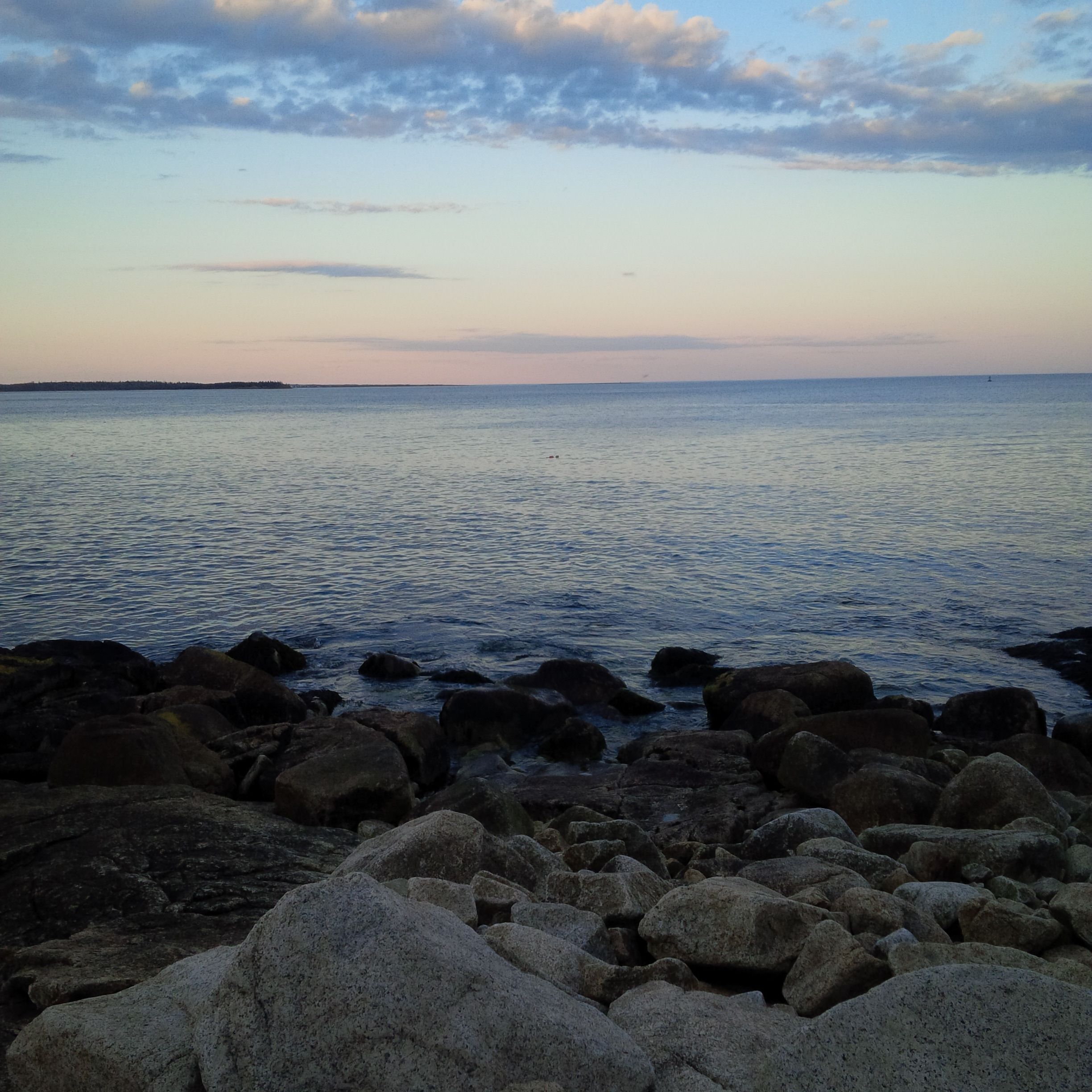
Herring Cove during the early Spring

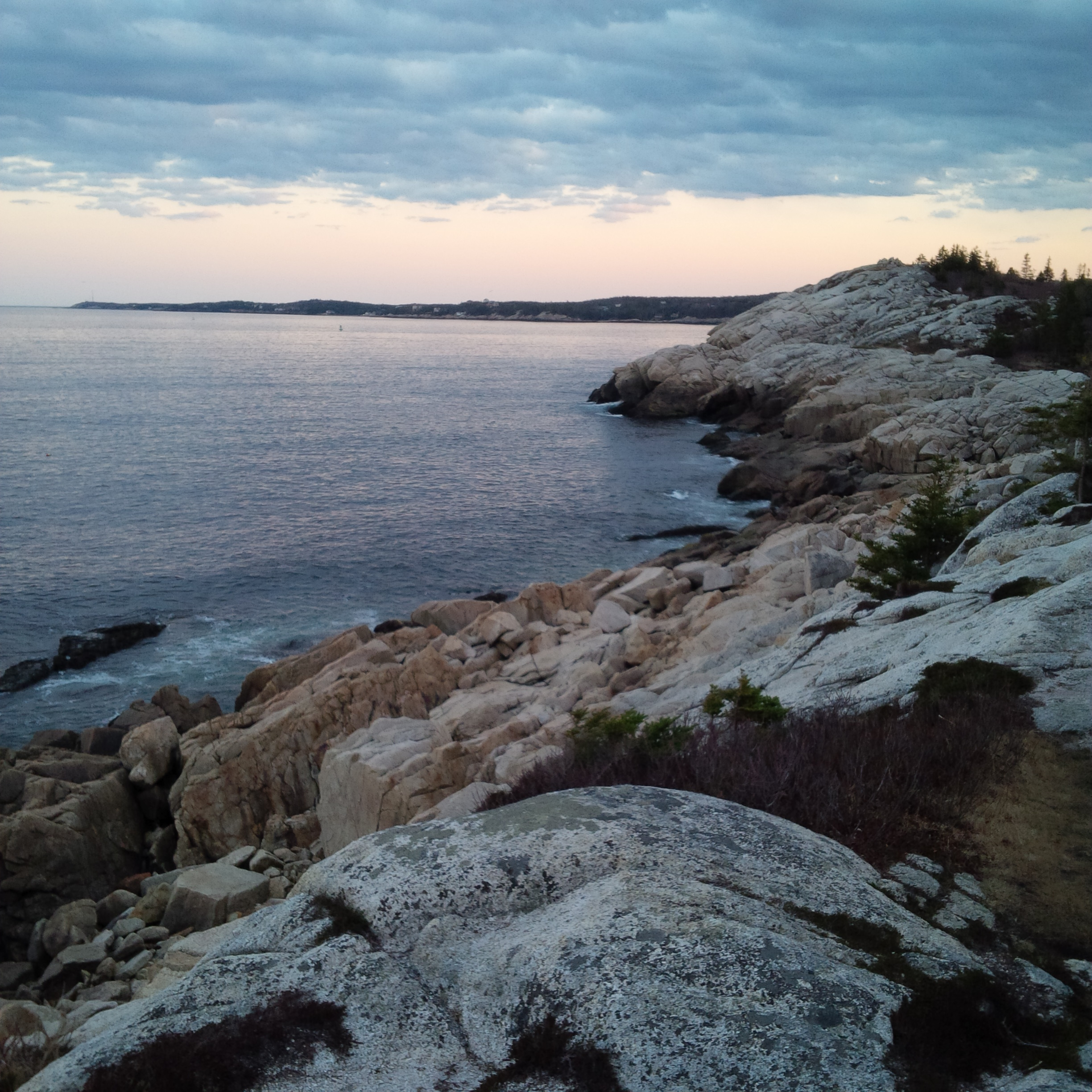
Herring Cove during the early Spring

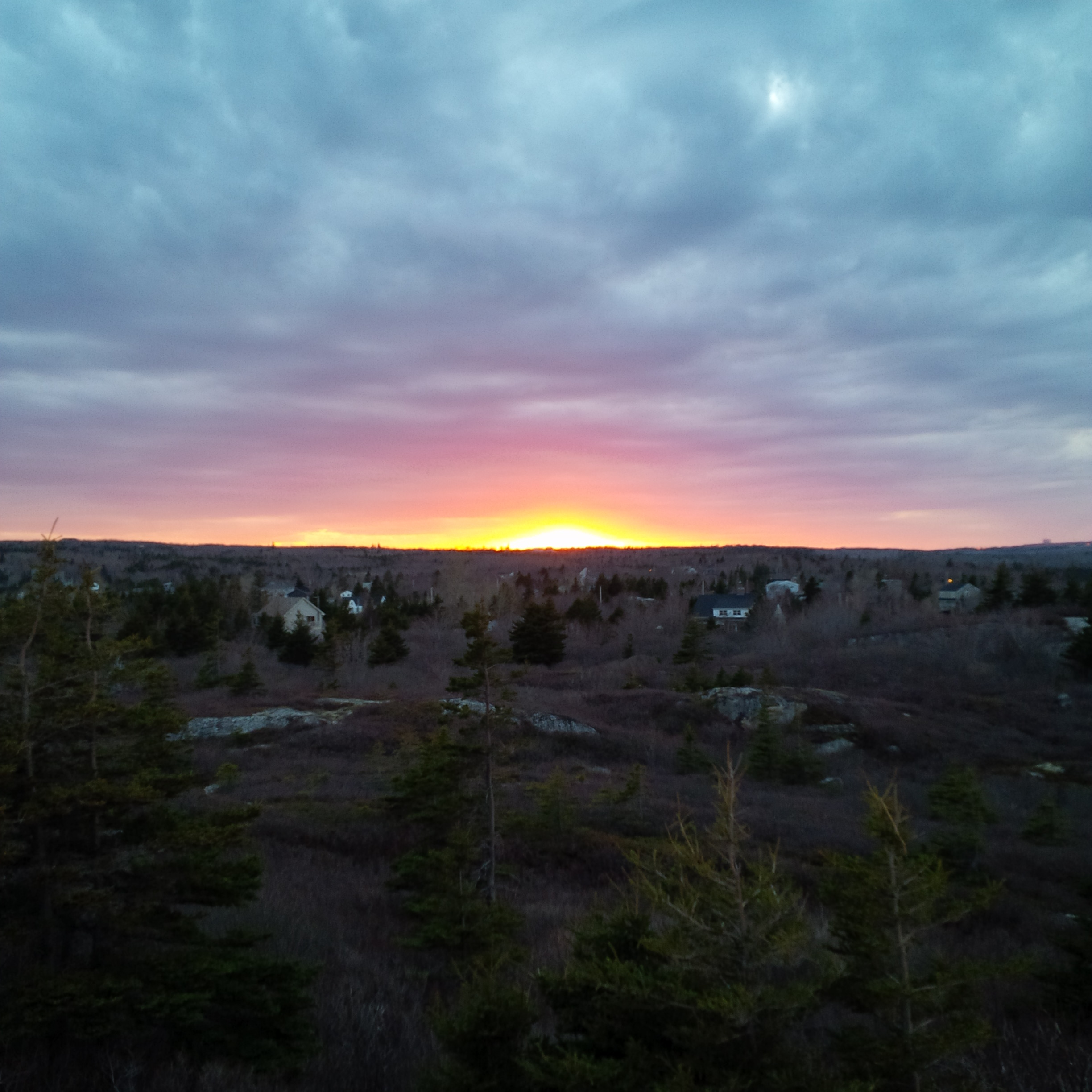
The area surrounding Herring Cove at sunset.

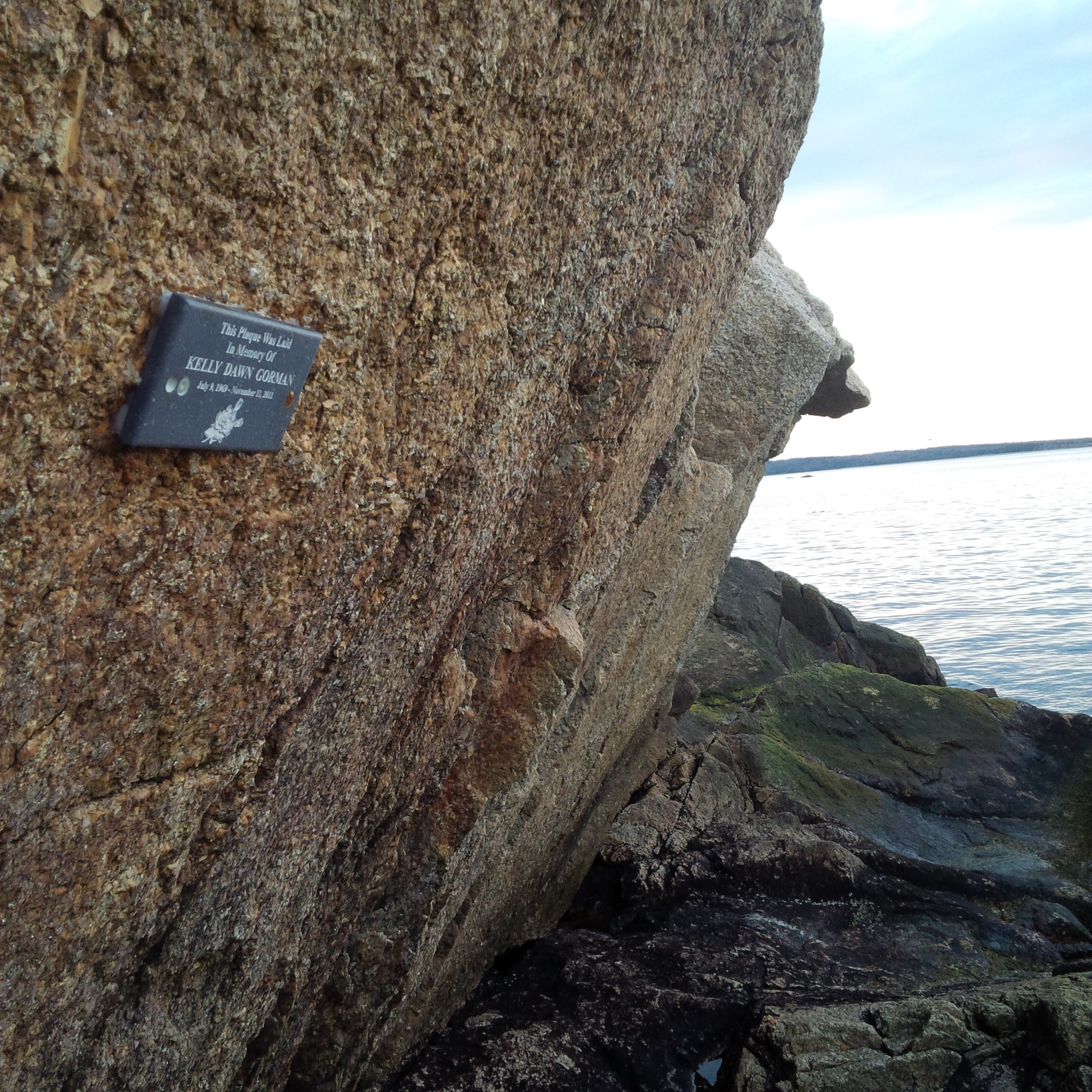
A memorial plaque at Herring Cove
