= Armdale =

Coordinates: 44°38′11″N 63°37′53″W

- Neighbourhood
- Interactive map of Armdale
- Country: Canada
- Province: Nova Scotia
- Municipality: Halifax Regional Municipality
- Community: Halifax
- Federal riding: Halifax
- Provincial electoral district: Halifax Armdale
- Municipal District: Halifax West Armdale
- Postal code: B3N, B3P
- Area codes: 782, 902

Armdale is a neighbourhood of the community of Halifax, Nova Scotia, Canada.

== History ==
Prior to European colonization, the Mi'kmaq inhabited these lands.

When Europeans began colonizing the land surrounding Halifax Harbour, they built blockhouses. In 1751, there were two attacks on blockhouses surrounding Halifax. The Mi'kmaq attacked the North Blockhouse (located at the north end of Joseph Howe Drive) and killed the men on guard. They also attacked near the South Blockhouse (located at the south end of Joseph Howe Drive), at a sawmill on a stream flowing out of Chocolate Lake into the Northwest Arm. They killed two men.

In 1753, when Lawrence became governor, the Mi'kmaq attacked again at the sawmills near the South Blockhouse on the Northwest Arm, where they killed three British. The Mi'kmaq made three attempts to retrieve the bodies for their scalps.

The largest employer during the 20th century in the Armdale area was Simpson's and later Simpsons-Sears, which operated a large warehouse for its catalogue division beside the railway line. This was later superseded by Maritime Life Assurance Company, which was absorbed by Manulife Financial in 2004. Armdale had its own post office, which no longer operates.

Original names for the community included Armdale District, Dutch Village, and North-West Arm. In 1969, the former city of Halifax annexed Armdale, Clayton Park, Fairview, Rockingham, and Spryfield. From 1969 until the creation of the Municipality of Halifax on 1 April 1996, Armdale, Clayton Park, Fairview, Rockingham, and Spryfield were grouped under the colloquial term Mainland Halifax.

Armdale railway station was once located near the Chebucto Road underpass, but it closed in 1990.

Prior to and following amalgamation with the City of Halifax, Armdale developed into a residential neighborhood consisting of single-family homes and small apartment buildings. A nearby commercial district in West End Halifax centred on the Halifax Shopping Centre has kept Armdale relatively free from retail development.

On 1 April 1996, Halifax County was dissolved and all of its places (cities, suburbs, towns, and villages) were turned into communities of a single-tier municipality named Halifax Regional Municipality. Subsequently, Armdale was kept as a neighbourhood--but of the Community of Halifax, within the new Municipality of Halifax.

Today, the name Armdale is mostly associated with a traffic circle located at the junction of Chebucto Road, Herring Cove Road, Joseph Howe Drive, Quinpool Road, and St. Margaret's Bay Road.

== Geography ==
Armdale borders the southern part of an isthmus connecting the Halifax Peninsula with the larger Chebucto Peninsula, and is at the head of the Northwest Arm. The neighbourhood extends shortly up the Herring Cove Road, Purcell's Cove Road, and St. Margaret's Bay Road. For a small distance, the neighbourhood borders the Canadian National Railway tracks that lead to downtown Halifax.
