= Communities in the Halifax Regional Municipality =

Coordinates: 44°51′16″N 63°11′57″W

Most communities of the Halifax Regional Municipality are marked with Welcome to our Community signs .

Halifax Regional Municipality has many different communities that vary from rural to urban. With a land area of 5,475.57 km^{2} (2,114.13 sq mi), there are more-than 200 communities-and-neighbourhoods within its boundaries.

== History ==
On 1st April 1996, all places (cities, suburbs, towns, and villages) within the former County of Halifax were reintroduced as communities of the Halifax Regional Municipality.

== Urban communities ==
The most urban communities surround Halifax Harbour. The built-up landmass that surrounds Halifax Harbour amounts to 23,829 ha (58,880 acres).

Community	Land area	2021 population	2021 population density (people per km^{2})	Notes	References
Beaver Bank	6.14 km^{2} (2.37 sq mi)				
Bedford	39.79 km^{2} (15.36 sq mi)				
Beechville	0.35 km^{2} (0.14 sq mi)				
Clayton Park	1.05 km^{2} (0.41 sq mi)	5,201	4,953		
Clayton Park West	0.58 km^{2} (0.22 sq mi)				
Cole Harbour	10 km^{2} (3.9 sq mi)				
Cow Bay	5.79 km^{2} (2.24 sq mi)	1,224	211		
Dartmouth	60.339 km^{2} (23.297 sq mi)	72,139	1,195	The community of Dartmouth is coterminous with the former City of Dartmouth.	
Eastern Passage	13.72 km^{2} (5.30 sq mi)				
English Corner	2.78 km^{2} (1.07 sq mi)	1,058	380.6		
Fairview	2.181 km^{2} (0.842 sq mi)				
Fall River	14.89 km^{2} (5.75 sq mi)	2,474	166		
Fletchers Lake					
Halifax	61.961 km^{2} (23.923 sq mi)	156,141	2,519	The community of Halifax is coterminous with the former City of Halifax.	
Hammonds Plains	33.31 km^{2} (12.86 sq mi)				
Upper Hammonds Plains					
Kinsac					
Lake Echo	4.76 km^{2} (1.84 sq mi)	2,365	496		
Lakeside					
Lakeview					
Lucasville					
East Preston					
North Preston					
Lower Sackville	5.66 km^{2} (2.19 sq mi)				
Middle Sackville					
Upper Sackville					
Shearwater	9.84 km^{2} (3.80 sq mi)				
Spryfield	10.74 km^{2} (4.15 sq mi)				
Still Water Lake	8.23 km^{2} (3.18 sq mi)	3,379	410		
Tantallon					
Upper Tantallon					
Timberlea	6.72 km^{2} (2.59 sq mi)				
Waverley	2.9 km^{2} (1.1 sq mi)	858	295		
Wellington					
Windsor Junction					
Woodside	5.28 km^{2} (2.04 sq mi)				

== Urban neighbourhoods ==
Neighbourhood	Community	Land area	2021 population	!2021 population density (people per hectare)	Notes	References
Admiral's Cove	Bedford	208 ha (510 acres)				
Albro Lake	Dartmouth	147 ha (360 acres)				
Armdale	Halifax	62 ha (150 acres)				
Armcrest	Lower Sackville	25 ha (62 acres)				
Atlantic Acres Industrial Park	Bedford	114 ha (280 acres)				
Austenville	Dartmouth	29 ha (72 acres)				
Downtown Bedford	Bedford	32 ha (79 acres)			Primary central business district of the community of Bedford.	
North Bedford	Bedford	64 ha (160 acres)				
Beechwood Park	Halifax	75 ha (190 acres)				
Birch Cove	Halifax					
Boulderwood	Halifax					
Brightwood	Dartmouth					
Brookview	Cole Harbour	24 ha (59 acres)				
Burnside	Dartmouth	1,376 ha (3,400 acres)				
Crichton Park	Dartmouth	131 ha (320 acres)				
Colby Village	Cole Harbour	479 ha (1,180 acres)				
Cowie Hill	Halifax					
Crystal Heights	Dartmouth					
Downtown Dartmouth	Dartmouth	36 ha (89 acres)			Primary central business district of the community of Dartmouth.	
Dutch Village	Halifax	59 ha (150 acres)				
Ellenvale	Dartmouth	81 ha (200 acres)				
Fairmount	Halifax	85 ha (210 acres)				
First Lake	Lower Sackville	35 ha (86 acres)				
Forest Hills	Cole Harbour	470 ha (1,200 acres)				
Glenbourne	Halifax	207 ha (510 acres)				
Glen Moir	Bedford	312 ha (770 acres)				
Graham's Corner	Dartmouth	84 ha (210 acres)				
Green Acres	Spryfield					
Greenwood Heights	Timberlea	97 ha (240 acres)				
Downtown Halifax	Halifax	410 ha (1,000 acres)	25,555	62	Primary central business district of the community of Halifax, and the primary central business district of Halifax Regional Municipality.	
Harbourview	Dartmouth	15 ha (37 acres)				
Hawthorne	Dartmouth	32 ha (79 acres)				
Highfield Park	Dartmouth	43 ha (110 acres)				
Humber Park	Cole Harbour	27 ha (67 acres)				
Hydrostone	Halifax	9.3 ha (23 acres)				
Imperoyal	Dartmouth					
Jollimore	Spryfield	81 ha (200 acres)				
Lakefront	Dartmouth	11 ha (27 acres)				
Lakeside Industrial Park	Lakeside	60 ha (150 acres)				
Leiblin Park	Spryfield					
Lindwood	Lower Sackville	134 ha (330 acres)				
South Lower Sackville	Lower Sackville	286 ha (710 acres)				
Manor Park	Dartmouth	54 ha (130 acres)				
Meadowlands	Lower Sackville	21 ha (52 acres)				
Melville Cove	Armdale					
Millview	Bedford	226 ha (560 acres)				
East Millwood	Middle Sackville	42 ha (100 acres)				
Millwood	Middle Sackville	234 ha (580 acres)				
Mount Royal	Halifax	23 ha (57 acres)				
Nantucket	Dartmouth					
North End	Halifax					
Park Avenue	Dartmouth	25 ha (62 acres)				
Portland Estates	Dartmouth	85 ha (210 acres)				
Portland Hills	Dartmouth	133 ha (330 acres)				
Portobello	Dartmouth					
Port Wallace	Dartmouth					
Prince's Lodge	Bedford	203 ha (500 acres)				
Quinpool	Halifax					
Regency Park	Halifax	61 ha (150 acres)				
Richmond	Halifax					
Rockingham	Halifax	199 ha (490 acres)				
Rocky Lake	Lower Sackville	980 ha (2,400 acres)				
Russell Lake West	Dartmouth	251 ha (620 acres)				
Sackville Business Park	Lower Sackville	158 ha (390 acres)				
Sackville Manor	Lower Sackville	32 ha (79 acres)				
Old Sackville Road	Lower Sackville	45 ha (110 acres)				
Shannon Park	Dartmouth	34.8 ha (86 acres)				
Sherwood Heights	Halifax	103 ha (250 acres)				
Silver's Hill	Dartmouth	39 ha (96 acres)				
South End	Halifax					
Spring Garden	Halifax					
Stonemount	Halifax	23 ha (57 acres)				
Thornhill	Spryfield	92 ha (230 acres)				
Tuft's Cove	Dartmouth	76 ha (190 acres)				
The Village	Halifax	33 ha (82 acres)				
Wallace Heights	Dartmouth					
West End	Halifax					
Westphal	Dartmouth	77 ha (190 acres)				
Woodlawn	Dartmouth	114 ha (280 acres)				

== Rural communities ==
Community	Land area	2021 population	2021 population density	Notes	References
Antrim					
Bald Rock					
Bear Cove					
Barkhouse Settlement					
Bayside					
Beaver Dam					
Beaver Harbour					
Beaver Island					
Beech Hill					
Big Lake					
Black Point					
Blind Bay					
Boutiliers Point					
Brookside					
Brookvale					
Caribou Mines					
Carrolls Corner					
Centre Musquodoboit					
Chaplin					
Chaswood					
Clam Bay					
Clam Harbour					
College Lake					
Conrod Settlement					
Crooks Brook					
Dean					
Debaies Cove					
Devon					
Devils Island					
Duncan's Cove					
Dutch Settlement					
East Chezzetcook					
East Dover					
East Jeddore					
East Lawrencetown					
East Loon Lake Village					
East Pennant					
East Petpeswick					
East Quoddy					
East Ship Harbour					
Ecum Secum					
Ecum Secum West					
Elderbank					
Elmsdale					
Elmsvale					
Enfield					
Falkland					
Ferguson's Cove					
French Village					
Gaetz Brook					
Glen Haven					
Glen Margaret					
Glenmore					
Goffs					
Goodwood					
Governor Lake					
Grand Desert					
Grand Lake					
Greenwood					
Hacketts Cove					
Halibut Bay					
Harrietsfield					
Hatchet Lake					
Head of Chezzetcook					
Head of Jeddore					
Head of Saint Margarets Bay					
Herring Cove					
Hubbards					
Higginsville					
Hubley					
Indian Harbour					
Ingramport					
Jacket Lake					
Jeddore Oyster Pond					
Ketch Harbour					
Lake Charlotte					
Lake Egmont					
Lake Major					
Lawrencetown					
Lewis Lake					
Lindsey Lake					
Liscomb Sanctuary					
Little Harbour					
Lochaber Mines					
Long Lake					
Loon Lake					
Lower East Chezzetcook					
Lower Lawrencetown					
Lower Prospect					
Lower Ship Harbour					
Lower Three Fathom Harbour					
McGraths Cove					
McNabs Island					
Malay Falls					
Marinette					
Meaghers Grant					
Middle Musquodoboit					
Middle Porters Lake					
Mill Lake					
Mineville					
Mitchell Bay					
Montague Gold Mines					
Moosehead					
Moose River Gold Mines					
Moser River					
Murphy Cove					
Murchyville					
Mushaboom					
Musquodoboit Harbour					
Myers Point					
Necum Teuch					
Newcomb Corner					
North Beaver Bank					
Oakfield					
Oldham					
Ostrea Lake					
Otter Lake					
Owls Head					
Oyster Pond					
Pace Settlement					
Peggys Cove					
Peggys Cove Preservation Area					
Pleasant Harbour					
Pleasant Valley					
Pennant Point					
Pleasant Point					
Popes Harbour					
Port Dufferin					
Porters Lake					
Portuguese Cove					
Prospect					
Prospect Bay					
Purcell's Cove					
Queensland					
River Lake					
Sable Island					
Saint Margarets Bay					
Salmon River Bridge					
Sambro					
Sambro Creek					
Sambro Head					
Sandy Cove					
Seabright					
Seaforth					
Shad Bay					
Sheet Harbour					
Sheet Harbour Passage					
Ship Harbour					
Simms Settlement					
Smiths Settlement					
Sober Island					
South Section					
Spry Bay					
Spry Harbour					
Tangier					
Taylors Head					
Ten Mile Lake					
Terence Bay					
Three Fathom Harbour					
Third Lake					
Trafalgar					
Upper Lakeville					
Upper Lawrencetown					
Upper Musquodoboit					
Watt Section					
West Chezzetcook					
West Dover					
West Jeddore					
West Lawrencetown					
West Pennant					
West Petpeswick					
West Porters Lake					
West Quoddy					
Whites Lake					
Williamswood					
Wyses Corner					
Yankeetown					
