= List of communities in Halifax Regional Municipality =

List of communities in the Halifax Regional Municipality, Nova Scotia

Communities are ordered by the highway on which they are located, whose routes start after each terminus near the largest community.

== Trunk routes ==
- Trunk 1: Bedford - Lower Sackville - Middle Sackville - Upper Sackville
- Trunk 2: Halifax - Bedford - Waverley - Fall River - Fletchers Lake - Wellington - Grand Lake - Oakfield - Enfield
- Trunk 3: Halifax - Beechville - Lakeside - Timberlea - Hubley - Lewis Lake - Upper Tantallon - Head of St. Margarets Bay - Boutilier's Point - Ingramport - Black Point - Queensland - Hubbards
- Trunk 7: Bedford - Dartmouth - Westphal - East Preston - Lake Echo - Porters Lake - Head of Chezzetcook - Gaetz Brook - Musquodoboit Harbour - Smiths Settlement - Head of Jeddore - Salmon River Bridge - Oyster Pond - Lake Charlotte - Beech Hill - Ship Harbour - East Ship Harbour - Murphy Cove - Pleasant Harbour - Tangier - Popes Harbour - Spry Harbour - Spry Bay - Mushaboom - Sheet Harbour - Sheet Harbour 36 - Sheet Harbour - Watt Section - Beaver Harbour - Port Dufferin - West Quoddy - East Quoddy - Harrigan Cove - Moosehead - Moser River - Necum Teuch - Ecum Secum
- Trunk 32: Halifax
- Trunk 33: Lower Sackville - Bedford

== Collector roads ==
- Route 207: West Chezzetcook - Grand Desert - Seaforth - Three Fathom Harbour - East Lawrencetown - Lawrencetown - Cole Harbour - Dartmouth
- Route 212: Goffs - Devon - Antrim - Wyse's Corner - Elderbank
- Route 213: Bedford - Hammond's Plains - Wallace Hill 14 - Hammonds Plains - Stillwater Lake - Upper Tantallon
- Route 224: Sheet Harbour - Marinette - Beaver Dam - Pleasant Valley - Mill Lake - Upper Musquodoboit - Greenwood - Elmsvale - Middle Musquodoboit - Chaswood - Cooks Brook
- Route 253: Halifax - Fergusons Cove - Herring Cove
- Route 277: Lantz - Dutch Settlement - Carrolls Corner
- Route 306: Halifax - Harrietsfield - Williamswood - Sambro
- Route 318: Dartmouth - Waverley
- Route 322: Dartmouth - Shearwater - Eastern Passage - Cow Bay - Cole Harbour
- Route 333: Halifax - Goodwood - Hatchet Lake - White's Lake - Shad Bay - Bayside - Blind Bay - Big Lake - East Dover - West Dover - Peggys Cove Preservation Area - Indian Harbour - Hacketts Cove - Glen Margaret - Seabright - French Village - Glen Haven - Tantallon - Upper Tantallon
- Route 336: - Upper Musquodoboit - Dean
- Route 349: - Halifax - Herring Cove - Halibut Bay - Bear Cove - Portuguese Cove - Duncans Cove - Ketch Harbour - Sambro Head - Sambro
- Route 354: Lower Sackville - Beaver Bank
- Route 357: Musquodoboit Harbour - Meaghers Grant - Elderbank - Middle Musquodoboit
- Route 374: Sheet Harbour - Malay Falls - Lochaber Mines - Liscomb Sanctuary - Trafalgar

== Rural roads ==
- Bald Rock
- Barkhouse Settlement
- Brookside
- Caribou Mines
- Chaplin
- Clam Harbour
- College Lake
- Conrod Settlement
- Debaies Cove
- East Chezzetcook
- East Jeddore
- East Loon Lake Village
- East Pennant
- East Petpeswick
- Glenmore
- Governor Lake
- Higginsville
- Jacket Lake
- Kinsac
- Lake Egmont
- Lindsey Lake
- Little Harbour
- Long Lake
- Lower East Chezzetcook
- Lower Prospect
- Lower Ship Harbour
- Lower Three Fathom Harbour
- Lucasville
- Middle Porters Lake
- Mineville
- Mitchell Bay
- Montague Gold Mines
- Moose River Gold Mines
- Mooseland
- Murchyville
- Myers Point
- Newcomb Corner
- North Preston
- Oldham
- Ostrea Lake
- Pace Settlement
- Pleasant Point
- Prospect
- Prospect Bay
- River Lake
- Sambro Creek
- Sober Island
- Southwest Cove
- Ten Mile Lake
- Terence Bay
- Third Lake
- Upper Lakeville
- West Jeddore
- West Loon Lake
- West Pennant
- West Petpeswick
- West Porters Lake
