= Musquodoboit Valley & Dutch Settlement, Nova Scotia =

Musquodoboit Valley / Dutch Settlement
- Administrative Region
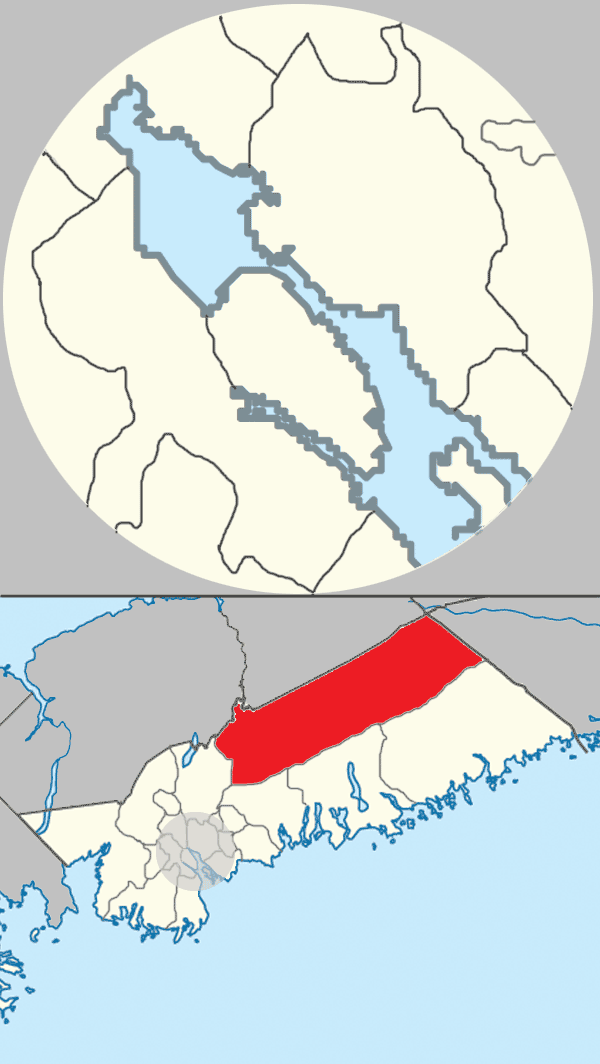
- Musquodoboit Valley & Dutch Settlement planning area of municipal Halifax.

- Location within Nova Scotia
- Coordinates: 45°3′6.98″N 63°7′51.15″W
- Country: Canada
- Province: Nova Scotia
- Municipality: Halifax Regional Municipality
- Founded: 1996 (as planning area)
- Communities: Antrim, Beaver Dam, Brookvale, Caribou Mines, Carrolls Corner, Chaplin, Chaswood, College Lake, Cooks Brook, Dean, Dutch Settlement, East Loon Lake, Elderbank, Elmsvale, Elmsdale, Glenmore, Governor Lake, Greenwood, Higginsville, Lake Egmont, Lindsay Lake, Long Lake, Loon Lake, Meaghers Grant, Middle Musquodoboit, Milford, Mill Lake, Moose River Gold Mines, Murchyville, Pleasant Valley, South Section, Ten Mile Lake, Upper Musquodoboit, Wyses Corner

Government
  - Council: Marine Drive Valley & Canal Community Council
- Time zone: UTC-4 (AST)
- Area code: 902
- Part of a series about Places in Nova Scotia

Musquodoboit Valley / Dutch Settlement is a Canadian administrative region in Nova Scotia's Halifax Regional Municipality.

It is a rural area across the northern part of Halifax County comprising the Musquodoboit Valley and the areas through to the county line in the Shubenacadie Valley, terminating at the community of Dutch Settlement.
