= Ketch Harbour, Nova Scotia =

Coordinates: 44°29′31″N 63°33′10″W

Ketch Harbour in Nova Scotia

Ketch Harbour is a rural fishing and residential community on the Chebucto Peninsula in the Halifax Regional Municipality on the shore of the Atlantic Ocean on Route 349, 17 kilometers from Halifax. It is currently inhabited by people who, for the most part, commute to Halifax and its surrounding areas to work. The community attained ownership of the government wharf in 1999 and since that time have worked to maintain public access to the harbour for the community. Ketch Harbour established a residents association at the same time to ensure its long term sustainability.

== Settlement History ==
The community has been an important fishing spot for well over two hundred years. It is situated close to the City of Halifax at a time when most travelled by boat. A fisherman's catch could be easily transported to Halifax by water for sale in the city's markets. This convenience made it one of the earliest spots to be settled following the colonization of Halifax in 1749.

By 1752, seventy-five people lived in Ketch Harbour. Within ten years it was known as Catch Harbour and a number of families had been issued grants. Thirty years later, by 1792, several more families had arrived, many of whom have descendants still living in the area.

== Communications ==
- Telephone exchange 902 – 346 868
- First three digits of postal code – B3V
- Internet Cable – Eastlink

== Community demographics ==
- Total Population – 1902
- Total Dwellings – 739
- Total Land Area – 74.14 km^{2}

== Surrounding communities ==
- Duncans Cove (Rural 1.96 km)
- Sambro Head (Rural 2.50 km)
- Sandy Cove (Rural 3.02 km)
- Bald Rock (Rural 3.38 km)
- Portuguese Cove (Rural 3.78 km)
- Sambro (Rural 4.65 km)
- Bear Cove (Rural 5.06 km)
- Sambro Creek (Rural 5.55 km)
- East Pennant (Rural 6.81 km)
- West Pennant (Rural 8.31 km)
