= Sandy Lake (Nova Scotia) =

Sandy Lake (Nova Scotia) could refer to one of the following lakes:

== Annapolis County ==
- Sandy Lake located at 44°55′29″N 65°12′31″W

== Guysborough County ==
- Sandy Lake located at 45°21′39″N 61°59′13″W
- Sandy Lake located at 45°20′44″N 62°1′29″W
- Sandy Lake located at 45°16′56″N 62°10′54″W

== Hants County ==
- Sandy Lake located at 44°50′25″N 63°57′24″W

== Halifax Regional Municipality ==
- Sandy Lake located on the Chebucto Peninsula at 44°30′42″N 63°39′41″W
- Sandy Lake located in Beaverbank at 44°52′58″N 63°39′47″W
- Sandy Lake located near Devon at 44°52′18″N 63°21′39″W
- Sandy Lake located at 44°44′7″N 63°54′45″W
- Sandy Lake located near Glen Moir at 44°44′5″N 63°41′59″W
- Sandy Lake located at 44°45′29″N 63°45′54″W
