= Ship Harbour =

Ship Harbour may refer to the following places:

- Ship Harbour, Newfoundland and Labrador
- Ship Harbour, Nova Scotia
- East Ship Harbour, Nova Scotia
- Lower Ship Harbour, Nova Scotia
