= Southwest Cove, Nova Scotia =

Southwest Cove is the name of several geographic place names in the Canadian province of Nova Scotia:

- Southwest Cove, a community in Halifax County
- Southwest Cove, a community in Lunenburg County

There are also several coves with this name in the province located in Guysborough County, Halifax County, Lunenburg County, Queens County, Yarmouth County.
