= Blind Bay =

Blind Bay may refer to the following places:

- Blind Bay (Antarctica)
- Blind Bay, British Columbia
- Blind Bay, New Zealand, the original name given to what is now known as Tasman Bay / Te Tai-o-Aorere
- Blind Bay, Nova Scotia
- Blind Bay (Washington)
