= Governor Lake =

Governor Lake may refer to:

- Governor Lake (Nova Scotia), lake in Nova Scotia
- Governor Lake, Nova Scotia, rural community in Nova Scotia
