= Montague Road =

Montague Road may refer to:

- Montague Road, London, part of the Pymmes Brook Trail in the London Borough of Enfield, UK
- Montague Road, Mass, part of Massachusetts Route 63, USA
- Montague Road, Nova Scotia, provides access to Montague Gold Mines, Nova Scotia, Canada
- Montague Road, Prince Edward Island, part of Route 3 (Prince Edward Island), Canada
- Montague Road School, which was replaced by The National School in Nottinghamshire, UK
- "Montague Road" (song), a track on Laura Veirs album The Triumphs and Travails of Orphan Mae
