= Brookvale =

Brookvale may refer to the following places:

- Brookvale, New South Wales
- Brookvale, Nova Scotia
