= College Lake =

College Lake may refer to:

- College Lake nature reserve, Buckinghamshire
- College Lake, Cornwall
- College Lake, Nova Scotia
