= Mineville =

Mineville may refer to:

- Mineville, New York, United States
- Mineville, Nova Scotia, Canada
