= List of shipwrecks in October 1840 =

The list of shipwrecks in October 1840 includes ships sunk, foundered, wrecked, grounded, or otherwise lost during October 1840.

== 2 October ==
List of shipwrecks: 2 October 1840
Ship	State	Description
Galston	United Kingdom	The ship was wrecked in Valentine's Bay, Tierra del Fuego. She was on a voyage from Liverpool, Lancashire to Valparaíso, Chile.

== 3 October ==
List of shipwrecks: 3 October 1840
Ship	State	Description
Martha	United Kingdom	The ship was wrecked on Beaudric Island, at the mouth of the Rhône.
Mary	United Kingdom	The ship was wrecked on the Gore Sand, in the Bristol Channel with the loss of all hands. She was on a voyage from Newport, Monmouthshire to Bridgwater, Somerset.

== 4 October ==
List of shipwrecks: 4 October 1840
Ship	State	Description
Edward Vincent	United States	The brig sailed from Mobile, Alabama for New York. No further trace, presumed foundered with the loss of all hands.
Flying Fish	United Kingdom	The ship struck the Seven Stones Reef and was damaged. She was on a voyage from Liverpool, Lancashire to Constantinople, Ottoman Empire. Flying Fish put into St. Mary's, Isles of Scilly.
John	Sweden	The ship was in collision with a brig off Bornholm, Denmark. She was on a voyage from Batavia, Netherlands East Indies to Stockholm. Presumed subsequently foundered.
Scotsman	United Kingdom	The brig ran aground and sank at Sunderland, County Durham. She was on a voyage from Sunderland to Aberdeen. Scotsman was refloated on 11 October.
Vincent	United States	The ship departed from Mobile, Alabama for New York. No further trace, presumed foundered with the loss of all hands.

== 5 October ==
List of shipwrecks: 5 October 1840
Ship	State	Description
Feal	United Kingdom	The ship was driven ashore in the Wadham Islands, Newfoundland, British North America. Her crew were rescued. She was on a voyage from Poole, Dorset to Saint John's, Newfoundland.
Hector	United Kingdom	The ship was driven ashore at Diamond Harbour, India.
Hunse	Russia	The ship was wrecked near "Filsund". Her crew were rescued. She was on a voyage from Saint Petersburg to Jersey, Channel Islands.

== 6 October ==
List of shipwrecks: 6 October 1840
Ship	State	Description
Victoria	United Kingdom	The ship ran aground off Cádiz, Spain. She was on a voyage from Gaspé, Lower Canada, British North America to Cádiz. Victoria was refloated the hext day and taken into Cádiz.

== 7 October ==
List of shipwrecks: 7 October 1840
Ship	State	Description
Mathilda	Russia	The ship was sighted off Helsingør, Denmark whilst on a voyage from Saint Petersburg to Livorno, Grand Duchy of Tuscany. No further trace, presumed foundered with the loss of all hands.
Victory	United Kingdom	The brig foundered in the Bristol Channel off Porlock, Somerset with the loss of all seven people on board. She was on a voyage from Tenby, Pembrokeshire to Cork.

== 8 October ==
List of shipwrecks: 8 October 1840
Ship	State	Description
Koentelly	Russia	The ship was driven ashore at Bolderāja. She was on a voyage from Saint Petersburg to Riga.
St. Andrew	United Kingdom	The ship ran aground on Taylor's Bank, in Liverpool Bay and was wrecked. She was on a voyage from New Orleans, Louisiana, United States to Liverpool, Lancashire.

== 9 October ==
List of shipwrecks: 9 October 1840
Ship	State	Description
John	United Kingdom	The sloop ran aground off the coast of Fife. She was on a voyage from Leith, Lothian to Glasgow, Renfrewshire. John was refloated and taken into Inverkeithing for repairs.
Martha	United Kingdom	The ship was sighted on this date whilst on a voyage from Sierra Leone to Liverpool. No further trace, presumed foundered with the loss of all hands.
Saran and Mary	United Kingdom	The ship was in collision with Oceanus (United Kingdom). She was on a voyage from Arkhangelsk, Russia to Cork. Sarah and Mary was abandoned on 20 October. Her crew were rescued by Hull (United Kingdom).

== 11 October ==
List of shipwrecks: 11 October 1840
Ship	State	Description
Preciosa	Bremen	The ship ran aground on the Magnusholm Reef, in the Baltic Sea. She was on a voyage from Bremen to Bolderāja, Russia.
Transcendant	United Kingdom	The ship was wrecked on the Colorados. Her crew were rescued. She was on a voyage from Jamaica to Baltimore, Maryland, United States.

== 13 October ==
List of shipwrecks: 13 October 1840
Ship	State	Description
Brothers	United Kingdom	The ship was driven ashore on Dragør, Denmark. She was on a voyage from Saint Petersburg, Russia to Liverpool, Lancashire. Brothers was refloated on 15 October and towed into Helsingør, Denmark for repairs.
Cambrian	United Kingdom	The sloop was wrecked near Swords, County Dublin, with the loss of all hands.
Jean	United Kingdom	The sloop was wrecked on the Knavestone Rock, in the Farne Islands, Northumberland. She was on a voyage from Aberdeen to Newcastle upon Tyne, Northumberland. Jean later floated off; she was towed into Great Yarmouth, Norfolk in a waterlogged condition on 19 October.
Oberon	Rostock	The ship was driven ashore on Læsø, Denmark. She was on a voyage from Charleston, South Carolina, United States to Rostock.
Syren	United Kingdom	The ship was driven ashore at Flamborough Head, Yorkshire. She was refloated the next day and resumed her voyage.
Velocity	United Kingdom	The ship struck a rock in the River Shannon and was consequently beached at Crookhaven, County Cork.

== 14 October ==
List of shipwrecks: 14 October 1840
Ship	State	Description
Catharina	Danzig	The ship ran aground on the South Reef, off Heligoland. She was on a voyage from Danzig to Ghent, Belgium.
Fama	Mexico	The segunda was wrecked on "Lobos Island". All 26 people on board were rescued by Austin ( Texas Navy).
Gironde	United Kingdom	The ship ran aground on the Haisborough Sands, in the North Sea off the coast of Norfolk. She was on a voyage from Quebec City, Lower Canada to Sunderland, County Durham. Gironde was refloated and anchored off Great Yarmouth, Norfolk.
Mayor	Hamburg	The ship was wrecked on Calolimino Island, in the Sea of Marmara. She was on a voyage from Hamburg to Trebizond, Ottoman Empire.
Victory	United Kingdom	The steamship ran aground in the Swash. She was on a voyage from Cork to Bristol, Gloucestershire.

== 15 October ==
List of shipwrecks: 15 October 1840
Ship	State	Description
Atkinson	United Kingdom	The ship ran aground on the Goodwin Sands, Kent and was damaged. She was on a voyage from Newcastle upon Tyne, Northumberland to Montevideo, Uruguay. Atkinson was refloated and put into Dover, Kent.
Brankenmoor	United Kingdom	The ship was wrecked near Cape Carabourni, Ottoman Empire with the loss of all but three of her crew. She was on a voyage from Odesa to a British port.
Trio	Hamburg	The ship departed from San Blas Atempa, Mexico for Valparaíso, Chile. No further trace, presumed foundered with the loss of all hands.

== 16 October ==
List of shipwrecks: 16 October 1840
Ship	State	Description
Charlotte	Prussia	The barque was driven ashore and wrecked at Ålum near Thisted, Denmark. Her crew were rescued. She was on a voyage from Calais, France to Newcastle upon Tyne, Northumberland.
Eleanor and Jane	United Kingdom	The ship was driven ashore and wrecked in Borth Bay. Her crew were rescued.
Victory	United Kingdom	The ship ran aground on the Swash, in the Bristol Channel.

== 17 October ==
List of shipwrecks: 17 October 1840
Ship	State	Description
Colonist	United Kingdom	The ship was driven ashore on Saint Kitts.
Richmond Castle	United Kingdom	The ship was wrecked on St. Peter's Island, Glamorgan. Her crew were rescued. She was on a voyage from Richibucto, New Brunswick, British North America to Porthcawl, Glamorgan.

== 18 October ==
List of shipwrecks: 18 October 1840
Ship	State	Description
Ferret	United Kingdom	The schooner was run down by a collier brig and sank in the North Sea off Flamborough Head, Yorkshire. Her crew were rescued. She was on a voyage from the River Tees to London.
Mary Ann	United Kingdom	The ship ran aground on The Shingles, off the Isle of Wight. She was on a voyage from Cork to Southampton, Hampshire. She was refloated and completed her voyage.
Nimrod	United Kingdom	The ship was in collision with Wealands (United Kingdom) and foundered in the North Sea off the Spurn Lighthouse, Yorkshire. Her crew were rescued.
Syren	United Kingdom	The ship was sighted off the Orkney Islands whilst on a voyage from Newcastle upon Tyne, Northumberland to Belfast, County Antrim. No further trace, presumed foundered with the loss of all hands.

== 19 October ==
List of shipwrecks: 19 October 1840
Ship	State	Description
Brothers	United Kingdom	The smack was driven ashore at Cley-next-the-Sea, Norfolk. She was on a voyage from Sunderland, County Durham to King's Lynn, Norfolk.
Chirk Castle	United Kingdom	The full-rigged ship foundered in the Atlantic Ocean with the loss of nine of the 34 people on board. Survivors were rescued by the brig Triton(United Kingdom). Chirk Castle was on a voyage from the River Mersey to Saint John, New Brunswick, British North America.
Hoop	Netherlands	The ship was driven ashore at Wijk aan Zee, North Holland. She was on a voyage from Málaga, Spain to Amsterdam, North Holland.
Marengo	United States	The ship was driven ashore at Widewall, Orkney Islands. Her crew were rescued. She was on a voyage from Newcastle upon Tyne, Northumberland, United Kingdom to New Orleans, Louisiana.

== 20 October ==
List of shipwrecks: 20 October 1840
Ship	State	Description
Adelaide	United Kingdom	The ship was wrecked on the coast of Crau, Bouches-du-Rhône, France. Her crew were rescued. She was on a voyage from Sunderland, County Durham to Marseille.
Alida Maria	Flag unknown	The ship was driven ashore and wrecked on the west coast of Texel, North Holland, Netherlands. Her crew were rescued. She was on a voyage from Liverpool, Lancashire, United Kingdom to "Minden".
Cornelius Star	Netherlands	The ship was wrecked on the Ooster Bank, in the North Sea with the loss of all but one of her crew. She was on a voyage from Liverpool, Lancashire, United Kingdom to Dordrecht, South Holland.
La Jolie Fille	United Kingdom	The schooner was burnt and destroyed at "Caerheen", Wales.
Lamb	United Kingdom	The ship was driven ashore in the IJ near Zeeburg, North Holland, Netherlands. She was on a voyage from Amsterdam, North Holland to Sunderland, County Durham. Lamb was later refloated and taken back to Amsterdam.
Vischerry	Netherlands	The ship was abandoned in the North Sea. She was on a voyage from London, United Kingdom to Harlingen, Friesland. Vischerry subsequently drove ashore at Wijk aan Zee, North Holland.

== 21 October ==
List of shipwrecks: 21 October 1840
Ship	State	Description
Lady	United Kingdom	The ship was wrecked at Faial Island, Azores. Her crew were rescued.
Neah	United Kingdom	The ship was driven ashore on Dragør, Denmark. She was refloated on 23 October and put into Reval, Russia for repairs.
Two Brothers	United Kingdom	The ship was driven ashore and damaged at Blakeney, Norfolk. Her crew were rescued. She was on a voyage from Sunderland, County Durham to King's Lynn, Norfolk.Two Brothers was refloated on 28 October and taken into Cley-next-the-Sea for repairs.

== 22 October ==
List of shipwrecks: 22 October 1840
Ship	State	Description
Clothilde	Belgium	The ship ran aground on the Spijker Plaat. Her crew were rescued. She was on a voyage from Antwerp to Liverpool, Lancashire, United Kingdom.
Eliza	France	The ship was wrecked on Goeree, Zeeland, Netherlands. She was on a voyage from Bordeaux, Gironde to Rostock.
Janet	United Kingdom	The ship was wrecked in the Chausey Islands, Manche, France. Her crew were rescued. She was on a voyage from Africa to London. Janet was refloated in mid-December and beached in shallow water.
Jenny	United Kingdom	The ship was driven ashore and wrecked at Newport, Monmouthshire with the loss of two of her crew.
Mary	United Kingdom	The ship was wrecked in the Magdalen Islands, Lower Canada, British North America. Her crew were rescued.
Richard Smith	United States	The ship was driven ashore and wrecked at Clam Harbour, Nova Scotia, British North America. She was on a voyage from Boston, Massachusetts to Sydney, Nova Scotia.
Susannah	United Kingdom	The ship was lost at Clam Harbour. She was on a voyage from Halifax, Nova Scotia to Demerara, British Honduras.

== 23 October ==
List of shipwrecks: 23 October 1840
Ship	State	Description
Alida	Belgium	The ship was driven ashore near Rügenwalde, Prussia. She was on a voyage from Riga, Russia to Ghent.
El Castellano	Spain	The ship was wrecked in the Atlantic Ocean with the loss of more than 67 lives.
Hendrika Frowina	Flag unknown	The ship was driven ashore in Mill Bay. She was on a voyage from Maldon, Essex, United Kingdom to Newcastle upon Tyne, Northumberland, United Kingdom.
Janet Andrews	United Kingdom	The ship was driven ashore and sank in the Channel Islands. She was on a voyage from Africa to London.
Swift	United Kingdom	The ship caught fire and was abandoned in the North Sea. Her crew were rescued by Ann (United Kingdom). Swift was on a voyage from Sunderland, County Durham to Gourdon, Aberdeenshire.

== 24 October ==
List of shipwrecks: 24 October 1840
Ship	State	Description
Emerys	United Kingdom	The brig was wrecked on the Cross Sand, in the North Sea off the coast of Norfolk. Her nine crew were rescued by the Great Yarmouth Lifeboat. She was on a voyage from Newcastle upon Tyne, Northumberland to London.
John	Hamburg	The ship was driven ashore and wrecked east of Calais, France. Her crew were rescued. She was on a voyage from Hamburg to Valparaíso, Chile.
Vrow Gesina	Netherlands	The ship was driven ashore and wrecked on Heligoland. Her crew were rescued. She was on a voyage from Harlingen, Friesland to Hamburg.
Vulcan	United Kingdom	The brig was driven ashore and wrecked on Johnshaven. Her crew were rescued. She was on a voyage from Aberdeen, Scotland to Montrose.
Cora	United Kingdom	The schooner was driven ashore and wrecked on Johnshaven. Her crew were lost, only the ship's dog survived. She was on a voyage from Aberdeen, Scotland to Montrose.

== 25 October ==
List of shipwrecks: 25 October 1840
Ship	State	Description
Buchanan	United Kingdom	The ship was abandoned in the Atlantic Ocean. Her crew were rescued by Ellen (United Kingdom).
Haidee	United Kingdom	The ship was driven ashore on "Quayle Island", Cape Verde Islands. She was on a voyage from Liverpool, Lancashire to Sydney, New South Wales. Haidee was refloated and resumed her voyage.
Hesperia	United Kingdom	The ship was abandoned in the North Sea. Her crew were rescued. She was on a voyage from Málaga, Spain to Leith, Lothian.
John	Hamburg	The ship was driven ashore at Calais, France. She was on a voyage from Hamburg to Valparaíso, Chile.John was wrecked on 13 November.
Messenger	United Kingdom	The ship was wrecked on Point Escuminac, New Brunswick, British North America. She was on a voyage from Liverpool, Lancashire to Saint John, New Brunswick.
Phenix	France	The paddle steamer was collision with the paddle steamer Britannia (United Kingdom) and sank in the English Channel off Dungeness, Kent. All 70 people on board were rescued by Britannia. Phenix was on a voyage from London to Havre de Grâce, Seine-Inférieure, France.
Zouave	France	The ship was wrecked near Mostaganem, Algeria.

== 26 October ==
List of shipwrecks: 26 October 1840
Ship	State	Description
Amphitrite	United Kingdom	The ship was wrecked on the Cross Sand, in the North Sea off the coast of Norfolk. Her crew were rescued.
Delight	United Kingdom	The schooner foundered in the English Channel off Portland Bill, Dorset. Her crew were rescued by HMRC Petrel ( Board of Customs). Delight was on a voyage from Hull, Yorkshire to Liverpool, Lancashire.
Junia	Stettin	The schooner ran aground on the Steinknotan and was wrecked. She was on a voyage from Stettin to Hull.
Superb	United Kingdom	The brig was abandoned in the Bay of Palma and subsequently foundered. Her crew were rescued. She was on a voyage from Livorno, Grand Duchy of Tuscany to London.
Union	United Kingdom	The ship was departed from Saint Petersburg, Russia for Hull. No further trace, presumed foundered with the loss of all hands.

== 27 October ==
List of shipwrecks: 27 October 1840
Ship	State	Description
Carlton Packet	(United Kingdom of Great Britain and Ireland) British North America	The schooner was wrecked in the Grand River. Her crew were rescued.
Vere	United Kingdom	The ship ran aground on Hamilton's Bank, in the Solent. She was on a voyage from Quebec City, Lower Canada, British North America to Portsmouth, Hampshire.
William Irvine	United Kingdom	The ship was dismasted and abandoned. Her crew were rescued. She was towed into Milford Haven, Pembrokeshire.

== 28 October ==
List of shipwrecks: 28 October 1840
Ship	State	Description
Adelaide	France	The brig was wrecked near Cette, Hérault. Her crew were rescued. she was on a voyage from Sunderland, County Durham, United Kingdom to Cette.
Majestic	United Kingdom	The ship was wrecked at Cape la Motte, Var, France. Her crew were rescued. She was on a voyage from Newcastle upon Tyne, Northumberland to Toulon, Var.
Zouave	France	The ship was wrecked near Mostaganem, Algeria.

== 29 October ==
List of shipwrecks: 29 October 1840
Ship	State	Description
Adelaide	United Kingdom	The ship was driven ashore and wrecked at Oran, Algeria. Her crew were rescued.
Alexander	United Kingdom	The ship was driven ashore near the Agger Channel, Denmark. Her crew were rescued. She was on a voyage from London to Christiansand, Norway.
Carolina Frederica	Stettin	The ship was wrecked near Helsingør, Denmark with some loss of life. She was on a voyage from Stettin to Saint Petersburg, Russia.
Flora	United Kingdom	The ship was run down and sunk by Commodore (United Kingdom) in the Irish Sea 8 nautical miles (15 km) off Douglas, Isle of Man with the loss of two of her four crew. she was on a voyage from Liverpool, Lancashire to Loch Duich.
George and Jane	United Kingdom	The sloop was in collision with Hero of the Nile (United Kingdom) and was consequently beached at Tynemouth, Northumberland.
Sarah	United Kingdom	The ship was driven ashore at Tynemouth.

== 30 October ==
List of shipwrecks: 30 October 1840
Ship	State	Description
James and Mary	United Kingdom	The schooner was driven ashore and wrecked at Peterhead, Aberdeenshire. She was on a voyage from Sunderland, County Durham to Peterhead.
Palinuras	United Kingdom	The ship was driven ashore in Tom Owen's Channel. She was on a voyage from Aruba to British Honduras. Palinuras was refloated with assistance from HMS Comus (Royal Navy).

== Unknown date ==
List of shipwrecks: Unknown date in October 1840
Ship	State	Description
Amphion	United Kingdom	The ship was wrecked at St. Shott's, Newfoundland in late October. Her crew were rescued. She was on a voyage from New York, United States to a port in Newfoundland.
Catherine	United Kingdom	The ship was driven ashore on the "Point of Kerara". She was on a voyage from Thurso, Caithness to Port Dundas, Renfrewshire. Catherine was refloated on 14 October and taken into Oban, Argyllshire.
Esker	United Kingdom	The ship was driven ashore at Kirkcaldy, Fife. She was on a voyage from Saint Petersburg, Russia to Kirkcaldy. Esker was refloated on 31 October.
Hannah	(United Kingdom of Great Britain and Ireland) New Zealand	The schooner was wrecked at Kawhia Harbour, New Zealand.
Harmony	United Kingdom	The ship was driven ashore near Helsingør, Denmark. She was on a voyage from Livorno, Grand Duchy of Tuscany to Saint Petersburg, Russia. Harmony was later refloated and put into Copenhagen, Denmark for repairs.
Margaret	United Kingdom	The ship was driven ashore near Faro, Portugal. she was on a voyage from Cardiff, Glamorgan to "Lyra".
Mary and Elizabeth	United States	The fishing schooner was at St. Peters, Nova Scotia on the Bay of St. Lawrence. Crew saved.
Mercurius	Netherlands	The ship was wrecked on the Kentish Knock before 23 October. She was on a voyage from Amsterdam, North Holland to Surinam.
Ophemia	(United Kingdom of Great Britain and Ireland) British North America	The ship was wrecked on the Olstens, off Barbados after 20 October.
Sarah	United Kingdom	The ship was wrecked on the Black Middings, off the coast of County Durham.
Speck	Flag unknown	The ship was driven ashore near Helsingør.
Swallow	United Kingdom	The ship was driven ashore near Starcross, Devon. She was on a voyage from Stockton-on-Tees, County Durham to Starcross. Swallow was refloated on 14 October and taken into Starcross.
