= Ship Harbour, Nova Scotia =

Ship Harbour
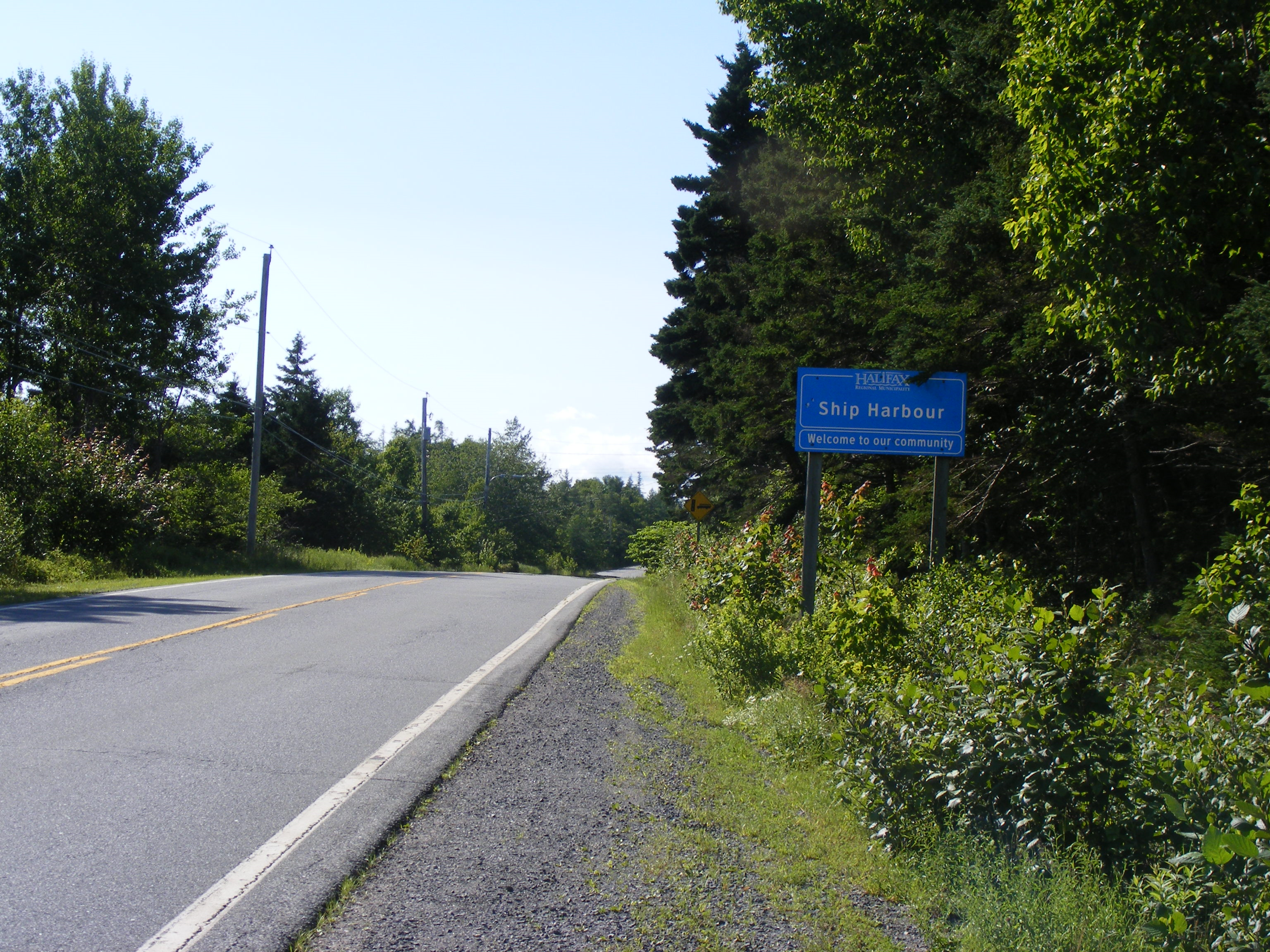

- Location within Nova Scotia
- Coordinates: 44°48′52″N 62°53′7.5″W
- Country: Canada
- Province: Nova Scotia
- Municipality: Halifax Regional Municipality
- District: 2
- Founded: 1783

Government
  - Governing Council: Halifax Regional Council
- Population: 174
- Time zone: UTC-4 (AST)
  - Summer (DST): UTC-3 (ADT)
- Canadian Postal code: B0J 2L0
- GNBC Code: CBINW
- Highways: Trunk 7
- Part of a series about Places in Nova Scotia

Ship Harbour is a rural community located along the Eastern Shore of Nova Scotia, Canada, in the Halifax Regional Municipality. It is situated at the head of a natural harbour of the same name which opens into the Atlantic Ocean. The community is located along Trunk 7, approximately 80 kilometres (50 mi) east of Halifax, Nova Scotia and 45 kilometres (28 mi) west of Sheet Harbour, Nova Scotia. The area was settled in 1783 by a group of Loyalists from the Royal Nova Scotia Volunteer Regiment. Ship Harbour is home to the Ship Harbour Mussel Farm (also known as Aquaprime Mussel Farm), one of the largest mussel farms in North America. It is also home to Ralph's Downeast Diner, a small diner on Highway 7. It was previously Family Fries. There is also a community hall that hosts meeting for the Lake Charlotte region. West Ship Harbour Road collides with Nova Scotia Trunk 7 in Ship Harbour, which connects Ship Harbour with Owls Head, Little Harbour, Clam Harbour, Clam Harbour Beach Provincial Park and Lake Charlotte. Some minor roads include: Head Ship Harbour Loop Road, River Road, Bruce Drive, Newcombes Lane, Eisan Point Road and Goose Lane. The community is adjacent to Weeks Lake.

== Etymology ==
The Mi'kmaq referred to the area as Tedumunaboogwek, meaning "water-worn rock". The name of the community was derived from the name of the harbour, which in turn was derived from a rock at the entrance to the harbour, named Ship Rock, as it resembles a vessel from a distance.
