= Owls Head Provincial Park =

Conservation area in Halifax County, Nova Scotia

Owls Head Provincial Park is an area of 266 hectares of Crown land in Little Harbour, Halifax, Nova Scotia.

== Ecology ==
The area is described by the provincial government as one of nine "globally rare" ecosystems in Nova Scotia. It is home to endangered and threatened species including the piping plover, barn swallow, ruby-crowned kinglet and common eider.

== Conservation ==
Although the area was commonly referred to as "Owls Head Provincial Park", it had never actually received designation as a provincial park. The area was managed as a park reserve. In 2019, CBC reported that they had, through an access to information request, discovered that the province had quietly removed the area from its list of sites pending protection, in response to lobbying by a private developer, which sought to build a series of golf courses there. The golf project was supported by MP Sean Fraser as well as MLA Kevin Murphy. It was derided by environmentalists.

The decision to delist Owls Head was met with "public outrage" and legal action. In November 2021, the development company withdrew an offer it had signed with the province. On 14 June 2022, the provincial government announced that it would designate Owls Head a provincial park after surveying and administrative work is completed. The designation includes three islands.
