= Otter Lake, Nova Scotia =

Coordinates: 44°37′23″N 63°43′49.9″W

Otter Lake in Nova Scotia

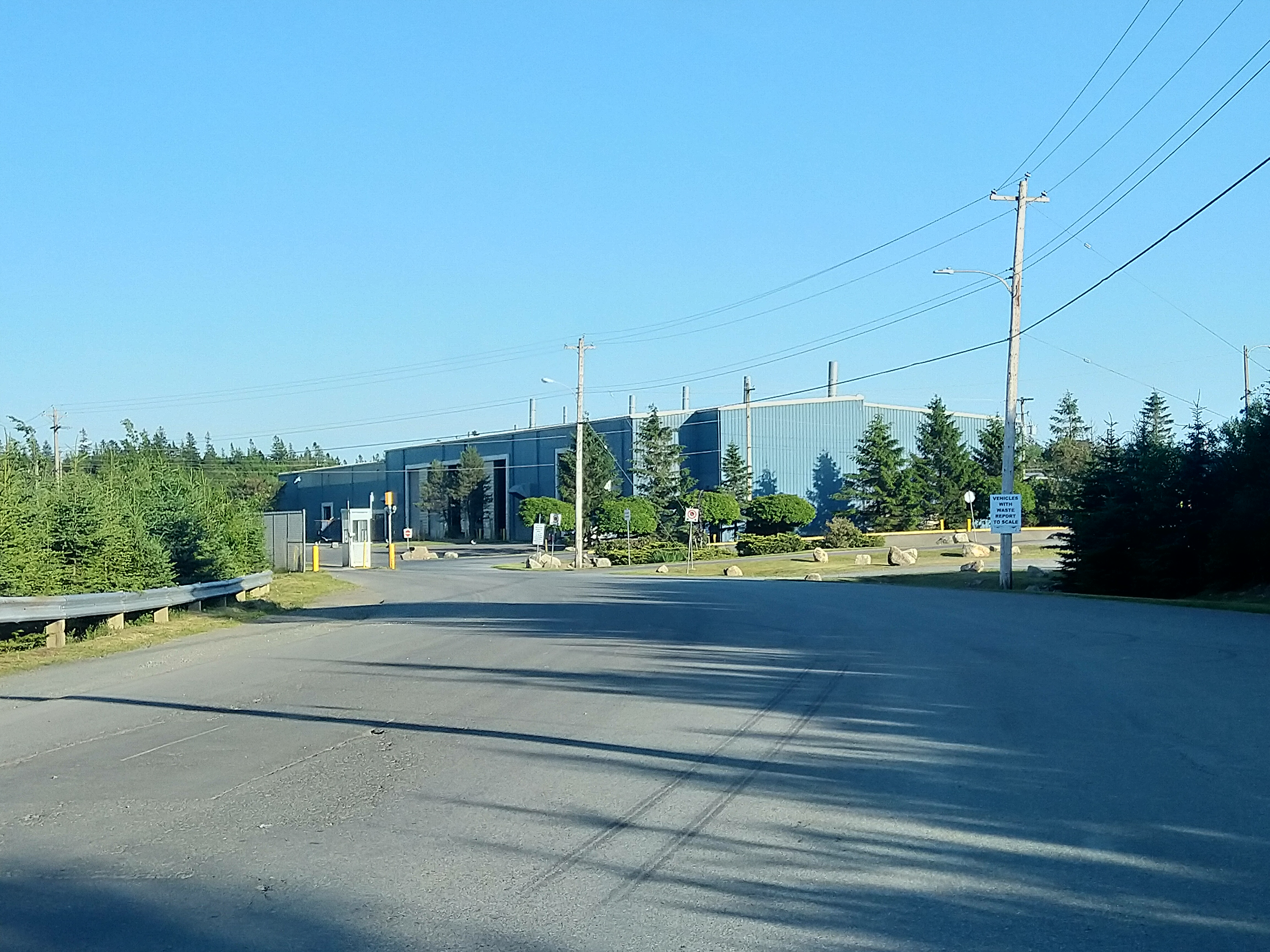
Otter Lake Waste Management Facility.

Otter Lake is a community of the Halifax Regional Municipality in the Canadian province of Nova Scotia.
