= McGraths Cove, Nova Scotia =

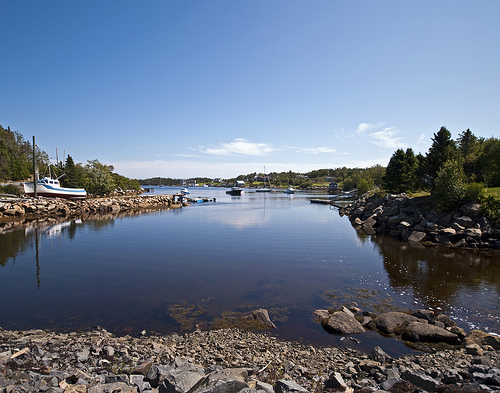
McGraths Cove, NS located near Peggy's Cove. McGraths Cove is just off of Route 333

McGraths Cove is a rural fishing community located near Peggy's Cove in the western part of the Halifax Regional Municipality, Nova Scotia, on Route 333. At the end of McGraths Cove Road, the Atlantic Ocean can be seen.

The village is still home to many of the original settlers and also home to new families. As the years have passed, new constructions have taken place, with new large modern houses appearing; McGraths Cove is becoming a developed community. Being near Peggy's Cove, a tourist attraction, McGraths Cove often becomes a sightseeing tour for many as they drive through.

After World War II, the general shopkeeper was Vera Duffy. Vera was known for being a Chicken Judge and having a duck sanctuary in her yard. Housing hundreds, if not thousands of birds of all varieties it landed her a spot on the TV series "On The Road Again" and having an article published in the early additions of the Chronicle Herald. The Duffy, Scott, Foran and Connors families are all early settlers. With the majority of the residence being the Scott family, the Duffy and Foran families also still reside in McGraths Cove. The first car to be owned in McGraths Cove was owned by John Whalen.

During the season(s), lobster is one of the main sources of fishing done within the McGraths Cove area. Also fished are mackerel, tuna, catfish (off-shore), etc. On clear nights, cruise ships leaving from the port of Halifax can be seen passing McGraths Cove, heading towards the United States (in the direction of Yarmouth).

== Communications ==
- Telephone exchange 902 - 852
- First three digits of postal code - B3Z

== Local Events ==
- Village Green Day (takes place in East Dover)
- McGraths Cove Raft Up (Armdale Yacht Club-AYC)
- Raft Up Information - Boats (mainly from AYC) gather in the cove for a weekend of planned events, such as poker runs, a dance (pirate themed) with a DJ. BBQs daily and many other events. A great party for the locals of McGraths Cove and also AYC members.
