= Sherwood Heights, Nova Scotia =

Coordinates: 44°40′12.5″N 63°39′45.2″W

Sherwood Heights, Nova Scotia is a residential neighbourhood in Halifax on the Mainland Halifax within the Halifax Regional Municipality Nova Scotia .
