= Trafalgar, Nova Scotia =

Trafalgar
- Community
- Location within Nova Scotia
- Coordinates: 45°17′17″N 62°39′34″W
- Country: Canada
- Province: Nova Scotia
- Municipality: Municipality of Pictou County; Saint Marys Municipal District; Halifax Regional Municipality

Government
  - Governing Council: Pictou County Municipal Council; Saint Marys Municipal District Council; Halifax Regional Council
- Highest elevation: 205 m (673 ft)
- Lowest elevation: 120 m (390 ft)
- Time zone: UTC-4 (AST)
  - Summer (DST): UTC-3 (ADT)
- Canadian Postal code: B0K 1C0
- Area code: 902
- Telephone exchange: 522
- GNBC Code: CBMGP
- Part of a series about Places in Nova Scotia

Trafalgar is a Canadian rural community located inland from Nova Scotia's Eastern Shore. While it is named after the Battle of Trafalgar, it is not pronounced the same as Trafalgar England. Emphasis is on the first syllable traf'-el-GAR.

It is located at the boundaries of Pictou County, Guysborough County (specifically the Municipality of the District of St. Mary's) and Halifax County (specifically the Halifax Regional Municipality).

Trafalgar is located on Route 374 at the north end of the Liscomb Sanctuary and an associated forest fire-fighting station.

== Porcupine Lake-Trafalgar Forest Fire ==
During the summer of 1976, a small brush fire of unknown ignition broke out with the fire quickly spreading to surrounding wilderness. It eventually consumed some 32,000 acres (130 km^{2}) of forest. Pilot William Burtt of Dominion Pegasus helicopters was dispatched from Cape Breton Island. Burtt, flying a Bell 206 jet ranger, selflessly provided relentless aerial attack. Through his diligent & heroic actions, Burtt was able to save the lives of a boy scout troop trapped by the fire.
