= Taylors Head, Nova Scotia =

Coordinates: 44°48′51.25″N 62°34′10.35″W

Taylors Head in Nova Scotia

Taylors Head is a rural community on the Eastern Shore of the Halifax Regional Municipality in the Canadian province of Nova Scotia.

It is home to Taylor's Head Provincial Park, which contains a range of scenic walking trails and natural coastal habitats.
