= Green Acres, Nova Scotia =

Coordinates: 44°35′39.5″N 63°35′55.5″W

Green Acres, Nova Scotia is a residential neighbourhood in Halifax on the Mainland Halifax within the Halifax Regional Municipality Nova Scotia . Not to be confused with Green Acres the Subdivision (land) in Kings County, Nova Scotia in The Annapolis Valley.
