= Mineville, Nova Scotia =

Coordinates: 44°41′50.41″N 63°22′58.34″W

Part of a series about Communities in Nova Scotia
Communities in Halifax Regional Municipality
Location of Mineville in Nova Scotia
Community Statistics
Area	6.69 km^{2}
Population	360*
Neighbourhoods in Community
Mineville
Incorporated Towns & Municipalities
Halifax Regional Municipality
Other Information
Website	http://www.mineville.ca/
Adjacent Communities
NORTH
East Preston, Lake Echo
WEST	EAST
Lawrencetown,	West Porters Lake, Porters Lake
SOUTH
East Lawrencetown
Footnotes
* According to StatCan Census Year 2001

Mineville, Nova Scotia is a suburban community in the east of Halifax Regional Municipality, Nova Scotia, Canada, between Lake Echo on Trunk 7, Highway 107 and Upper Lawrencetown on Route 207. The main road is Mineville Road. The other road is Candy Mountain Road. The community has two lakes: Lawrencetown Lake and Lake Echo.
