= Yankeetown, Nova Scotia =

Locality in Nova Scotia, Canada

Coordinates: 44°43′38.04″N 63°49′3.01″W

Yankeetown in Nova Scotia

Yankeetown is a locality in the Halifax Regional Municipality on Route 213, 25.8 km from Halifax, Nova Scotia. It suffered significant damage during the 2023 Nova Scotia wildfires.
