= West Dover, Nova Scotia =

West Dover
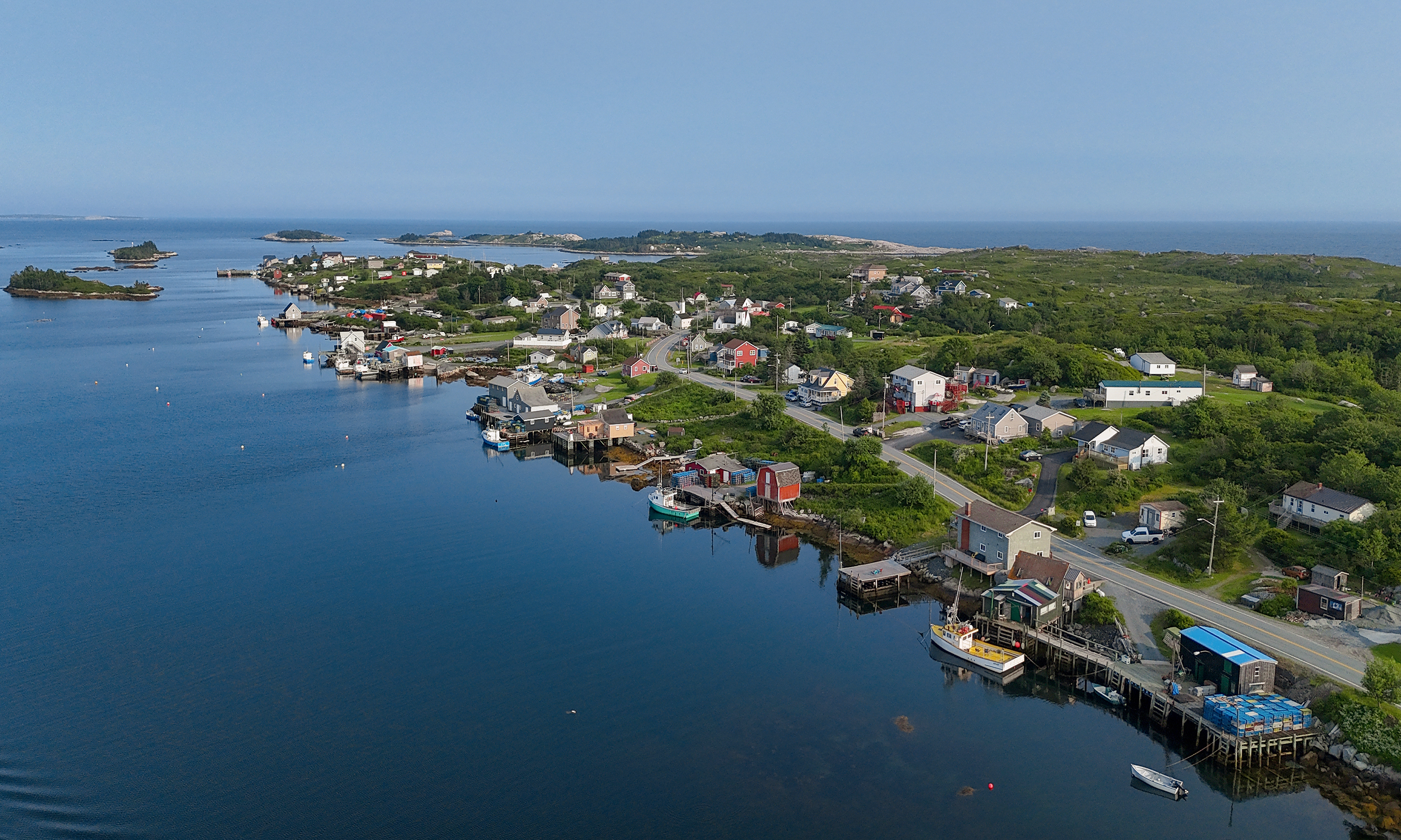
- West Dover in 2025

- Location of West Dover in Nova Scotia
- Coordinates: 44°29′57.42″N 63°52′49.48″W
- Country: Canada
- Province: Nova Scotia
- Regional Municipality: Halifax Regional Municipality
- Village: West Dover
- Founded: 1775

Government
  - MP: Gerald Keddy (South Shore—St. Margaret's)
  - MLA: Denise Peterson-Rafuse (Chester-St. Margaret's)
  - Councillor: Reg Rankin (District 22 Timberlea - Prospect)
- Elevation: 10 m (33 ft)
- Highest elevation: 28 m (92 ft)
- Lowest elevation: 0 m (0 ft)

Population (July 2010 est.)
  - West Dover: 180
  - Demonym: Doverite
- Time zone: UTC-4 (AST)
  - Summer (DST): UTC-3 (Atlantic Daylight Saving Time)
- Postal Code: B
- Area code: 902

West Dover, is a coastal fishing community located in the Halifax Regional Municipality in the Canadian province of Nova Scotia on the Chebucto Peninsula. West Dover is situated between Peggy's Cove and East Dover on Highway 333.

== History ==
=== The early years ===
West Dover was created in the 1770s with the Troope and Scott land grants. Major settlement began in the 1800s when a permanent fishing village was established. The founding family names were: Morash, Zinck, Scott, Publicover, Cleveland, Berringer, Umlah, Taylor, Troop, Young names arriving in late 1800s include Allen and Richardson among other prominent names that arrived during the mid to late 1800s. These names are still common in the area today. The families were mostly of European descent.

Cod, Mackerel, Pollack, Herring, Haddock, Halibut, Lobster, and Tuna were plentiful in the early years. The fish was salted and dried to preserve them as there was no refrigeration. The fish was sold in Halifax and made its way up and down the East Coast. During this time West Dover predominantly had schooners an average of 40 feet in length fishing out of the harbour, as well as smaller fishing boats, and punts that people had to manually row close to shore.

=== 1920s–1930s ===
Prohibition in the United States created opportunity in West Dover from 1920 - 1933 for rum running. Rum running was something that supplemented fishing income and was risky but highly profitable. The fishermen would set out with a load of alcohol on moonless nights and navigate in the darkness to the coast of Maine. The alcohol was stored in wooden barrels loaded with salt. If the fishermen noticed law enforcement vessels they would dump the barrels overboard. The salt in the barrels would slowly dissolve. A few hours later, after the law enforcement officials had left, the barrels would float back up to the surface and be brought back on board.

=== 1940s–1950s ===
This period saw a lot of change occur in West Dover. A new paved highway was built that made Halifax more accessible. The improved roads brought more traffic to the area and saw the first tourists visit the area. Electricity and phone service was added that improved life in the village and reduced the use of oil lamps for lighting. The first TV sets arrived in West Dover in the mid-1950s.

In the 1950s the first government wharf was built at the entrance to Dover Harbour also called Dover Soi. Also in the 1950s the first Post Office was opened by Duggan's General Store and later operated by Judson and Minnie Smeltzer.

=== 1960s–1970s ===
In 1961 the Peggy's Cove Preservation Area was created by expropriating the land surrounding Peggy's Cove, West Dover, and Indian Harbour.

The Government wharf was rebuilt in the 1970s on the site of the first wharf.

=== 1980s–1990s ===
The Collapse of the Northern Cod Fishery in 1992 led to the closure of West Dover's only fish plant and was a major loss of income for the village. Many people left fishing and started working in the construction industry.

After the decline of the Cod stocks, the lobster fishing industry has taken over as one of the most important fishing activities in West Dover.

=== Present day ===
West Dover remains, to this day, one of the few villages in the area that carries on a fishing tradition. West Dover has dozens of small wharfs and fish stages used by the fishers along the shoreline and a large government wharf at the harbour entrance.

In 2008, West Dover connected to high-speed internet through Eastlink Communications.

An influx of new residents and development has occurred in West Dover over the last decade.

== Geography ==
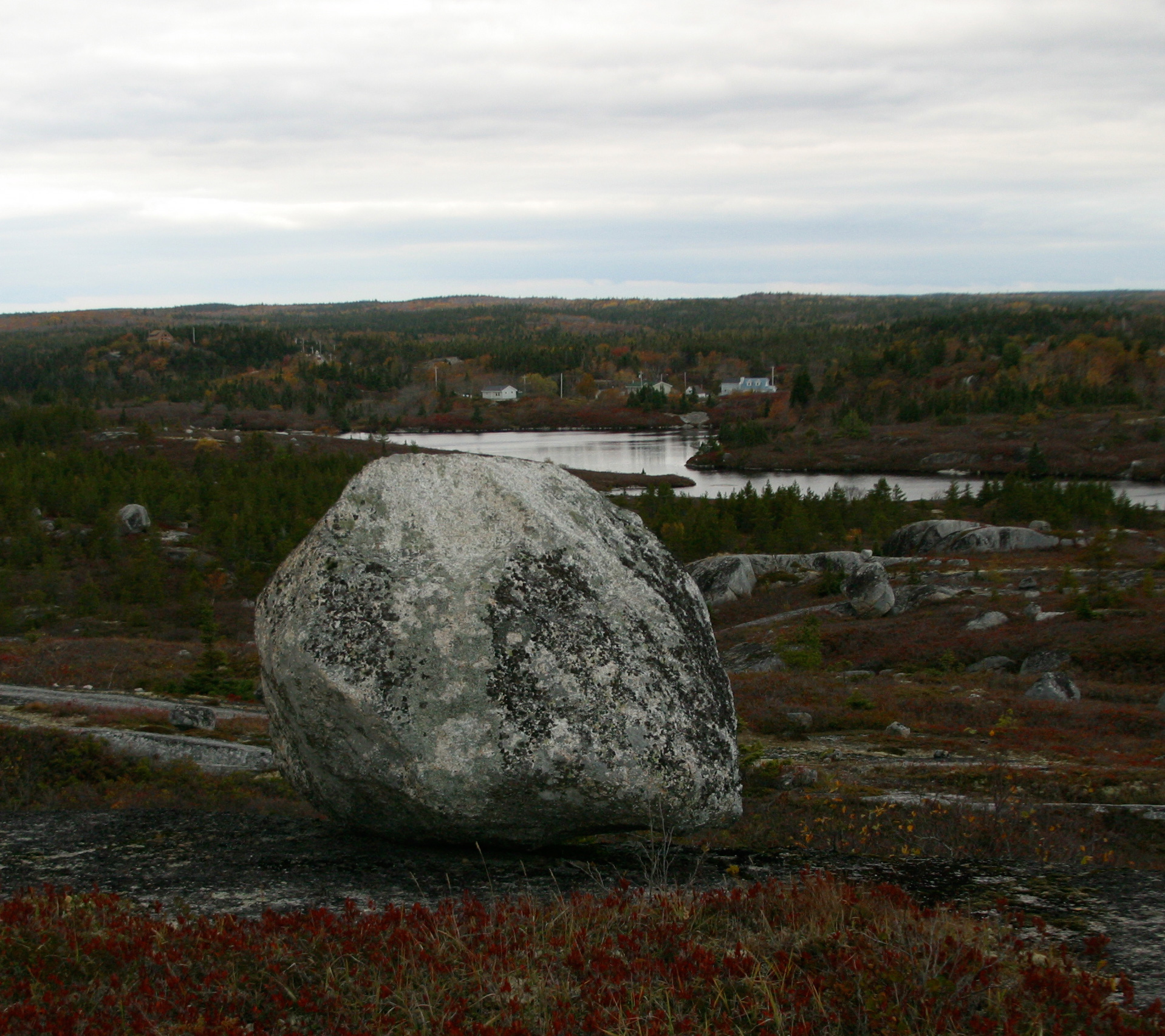
A glacial erratic in "The Barrens" near West Dover

=== Topography ===
West Dover was reshaped by glaciers during the last ice age approximately 10,000 years ago. The landscape has large areas of exposed granite and an average of less than 10 inches of soil. The park area around West Dover is known as "The Barrens" and has countless lakes, bogs, and granite hills. Glacial erratics are scattered across the hillsides.

== Culture ==
=== Leisure and entertainment ===
West Dover is a popular tourist location in the summer and has inns, cottages, and B&Bs. Rock climbers visit West Dover for its granite hills and glacially exposed boulders.

Dover Island is one if not the best area for bouldering around Halifax. Yes there are other good areas other than Dover but none with Dover's concentration of quality boulder problems and its breath taking scenery.

— Ghislain Losier, Halifax Bouldering

During the summer tourism season sailboats and yachts take shelter in West Dover's protected harbour. The government wharf is the usual place for visiting boats to moor.

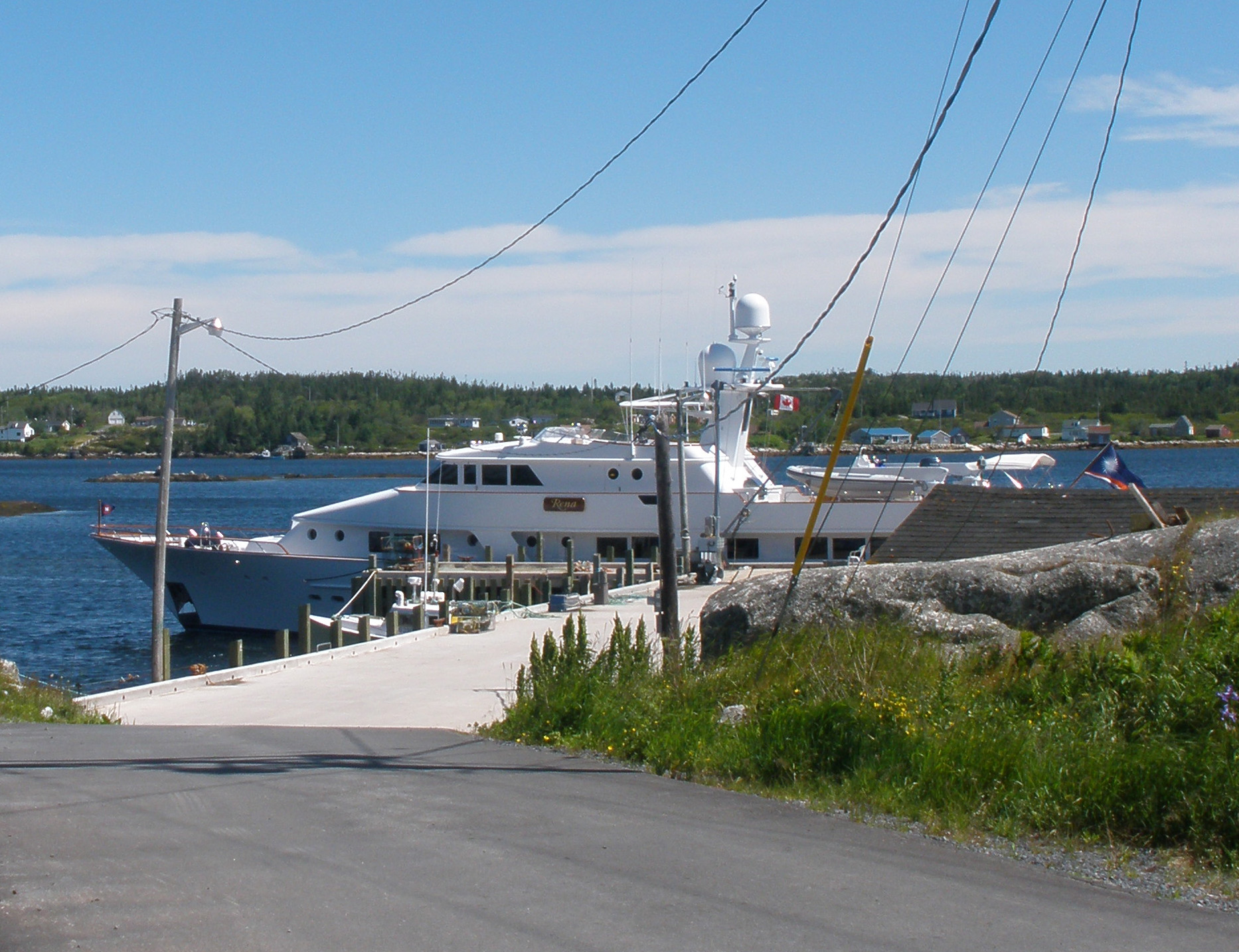
The Luxury Yacht Rena Visits West Dover

=== Film and television ===
Movies like the Shipping News, and The Weight of Water, and music videos like The Trew's Hope & Ruin have filmed in West Dover due to its seaside location, and barren rustic scenery.
