= Clam Bay, Nova Scotia =

Community in Nova Scotia, Canada

Coordinates: 44°43′58.1″N 62°55′12.8″W

Clam Bay in Nova Scotia

Clam Bay is a rural community in the Canadian province of Nova Scotia, located in the Halifax Regional Municipality.
