= West Pennant, Nova Scotia =

Community in Nova Scotia, Canada

Coordinates: 44°28′16″N 63°39′12″W

West Pennant in Nova Scotia

West Pennant is a rural community located at the head of Pennant Harbour near Sambro on the Chebucto Peninsula in the Halifax Regional Municipality Nova Scotia on Route 349 West Pennant is an old fishing community that sits on Fawson and Long Coves that open into Pennant Harbour. There are nearby islands: Martin Island, Powers Island, and Pennant Island. Powers Island is privately owned. Once Mi'k Maq hunting and fishing grounds, West Pennant has been occupied by three dominant colonial families since the mid 1700s: the Marriotts, Grays, and Toughs (pronounced Took). Just 25 minutes from Halifax, West Pennant is evolving into a suburb of Halifax with many local residents moving in from other parts of Canada and overseas. Until the 1970s most families earned their living fishing, now most families have one or more members who work in Halifax-Dartmouth. West Pennant is also home to cottagers. The local corner store is Mishoo's Right Stop. West Pennant is only a few kilometres from Crystal Crescent Beach Provincial park, a unique beach flanked with granite outcrops and white sand beaches. West Pennant also borders Terrance Bay Wilderness area. Local wildlife include porcupines, deer, coyotes, bobcat, black bear, pheasant, partridge, bald eagles, golden eagles, herring gulls, osprey, beaver, moles, shrew, monarch butterfly (seasonal), raccoon, mink, muskrat, otter, harbour seals, blue jays, american goldfinch, american robin, hummingbirds (seasonal), bobcat, and possibly cougar (recolonized from Western North America), and right whale. Fishing is a common occupation and hobby. The dominant species caught in Pennant Harbour are Atlantic Cod, Mackerel, Boston Blue Fish, and further out, Halibut, Swordfish, and Haddock. Squid can be caught off of the government wharf in Sambro during summer nights. There is also a commercial fishery for lobster. Once the poor man's food, lobster is now a local delicacy.

== Communications ==
- Telephone exchange 902 - 868 or 346
- First three digits of postal code - B3V
