= Wellington, Nova Scotia =

Wellington
- Suburban Community
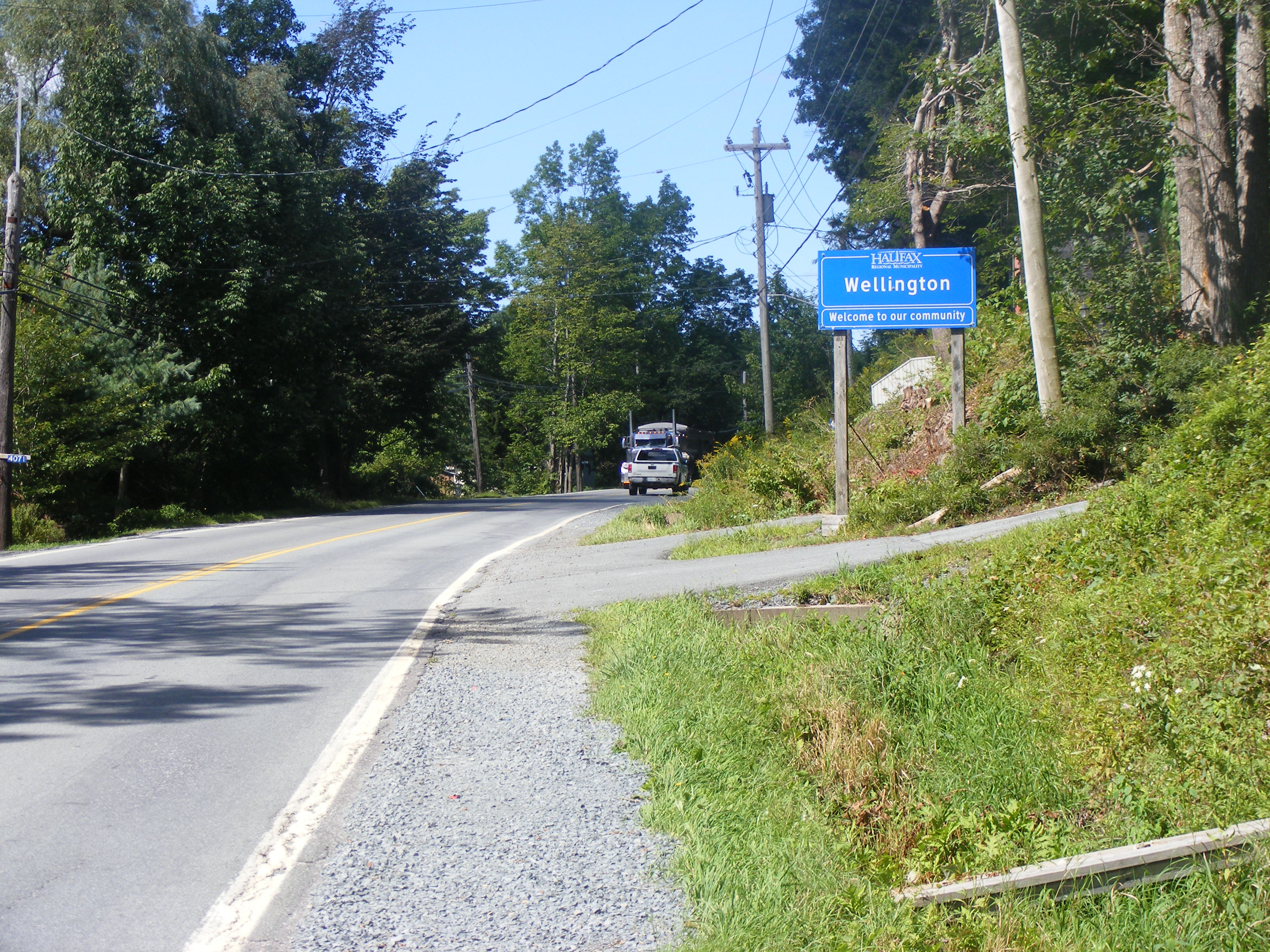

- Location within Nova Scotia
- Country: Canada
- Province: Nova Scotia
- Municipality: Halifax Regional Municipality
- Community council: Halifax Regional Community Council
- Postal code: B2T
- Area code: 782, 902

Wellington is a suburban community of the Halifax Regional Municipality, Nova Scotia on Fletcher's Lake on Trunk 2 approximately 23.3 kilometres (14.5 mi) from Halifax.

== History ==
Wellington is situated on the Canadian National Railway line approximately sixteen miles (26 kilometres) north of the city of Halifax. It was formerly known as Fletcher's Bridge on Fletcher's from the Fletcher family who resided there. Two thousand acres were granted to William Shaw on September 16, 1784. Other early grantees included James Oram, John Lees and John Gay. Shortly afterwards William Fletcher Sr. purchased land on both sides of the head of what is now Lake Fletcher from Peter McNab, Senior. His son Robert Fletcher who had been living at Fletcher's Bridge since 1795, purchased William Fletcher's rights but there were difficulties over the title. Robert Fletcher received a grant of 250 acres in 1812, bordering the road from Halifax to Truro, and merchants of Halifax, James and William Cochran, received 500 acres each in the same year.

The Intercolonial Railway was built through the community in 1856 and a station was established. The name "Wellington" was bestowed in honour of the Duke of Wellington by Lieutenant-General John Wimburn Laurie (1835–1912), who established the large estate of "Oakfield" nearby in 1865. There had been a previous settlement named Wellington in the 1820s along the Halifax – Annapolis military road of veterans who had served under the "Iron Duke" in the Peninsular Wars but it was abandoned about 1860 after large scale forest fires.

A new United Church was dedicated on October 30, 1955. In 1836 there was a schoolhouse opposite Fraser's Inn on the Truro Road, and, in May 1936 a site was purchased for a new Junior High School. Lumbering and farming were the basic industries for many years; now there is some tourism to Laurie Park which was opened in 1961. Many residents are employed in the metropolitan Halifax area. The population in 1956 was 100. Originally Wellington was an area where cottages were located. Today the cottages are winterized and the residents commute to jobs in Bedford, Dartmouth, Halifax or the Halifax International Airport.

== Communications ==
- First three digits of the postal code - B2T
- Telephone --902 854, 861, 860 - Aliant 576 -Eastlink
- Cable Internet access - Eastlink, Bell, CityWide, Purple Cow
