= St.Margarets Bay, Nova Scotia =

Coordinates: 44°41′2.6″N 63°51′58.4″W

St. Margarets Bay in Nova Scotia

St. Margarets Bay is a community of the Halifax Regional Municipality in the Canadian province of Nova Scotia.

== Climate ==
Climate data for St. Margaret's Bay (1981–2010)
| Month | Jan | Feb | Mar | Apr | May | Jun | Jul | Aug | Sep | Oct | Nov | Dec | Year |
|---|---|---|---|---|---|---|---|---|---|---|---|---|---|
| Record high °C (°F) | 15.0 (59.0) | 17.0 (62.6) | 22.8 (73.0) | 27.2 (81.0) | 32.0 (89.6) | 36.0 (96.8) | 34.0 (93.2) | 34.4 (93.9) | 34.0 (93.2) | 30.6 (87.1) | 23.9 (75.0) | 16.7 (62.1) | 36.0 (96.8) |
| Mean daily maximum °C (°F) | −0.2 (31.6) | 0.8 (33.4) | 4.0 (39.2) | 9.3 (48.7) | 15.0 (59.0) | 20.1 (68.2) | 23.4 (74.1) | 23.6 (74.5) | 20.2 (68.4) | 14.1 (57.4) | 8.4 (47.1) | 3.0 (37.4) | 11.8 (53.2) |
| Daily mean °C (°F) | −5.7 (21.7) | −5.1 (22.8) | −1.2 (29.8) | 4.3 (39.7) | 9.4 (48.9) | 14.3 (57.7) | 17.8 (64.0) | 18.0 (64.4) | 14.2 (57.6) | 8.5 (47.3) | 3.8 (38.8) | −1.8 (28.8) | 6.4 (43.5) |
| Mean daily minimum °C (°F) | −11.3 (11.7) | −11.0 (12.2) | −6.3 (20.7) | −0.7 (30.7) | 3.9 (39.0) | 8.4 (47.1) | 12.1 (53.8) | 12.3 (54.1) | 8.2 (46.8) | 3.0 (37.4) | −0.9 (30.4) | −6.7 (19.9) | 0.9 (33.6) |
| Record low °C (°F) | −32.8 (−27.0) | −31.7 (−25.1) | −27.8 (−18.0) | −22.2 (−8.0) | −7.2 (19.0) | −1.7 (28.9) | −0.6 (30.9) | 0.0 (32.0) | −3.9 (25.0) | −10.0 (14.0) | −16.1 (3.0) | −28.0 (−18.4) | −32.8 (−27.0) |
| Average precipitation mm (inches) | 130.1 (5.12) | 106.5 (4.19) | 134.4 (5.29) | 111.7 (4.40) | 119.1 (4.69) | 96.5 (3.80) | 95.7 (3.77) | 83.9 (3.30) | 101.8 (4.01) | 122.1 (4.81) | 147.3 (5.80) | 132.6 (5.22) | 1,381.6 (54.39) |
| Average rainfall mm (inches) | 86.5 (3.41) | 76.6 (3.02) | 109.3 (4.30) | 106.0 (4.17) | 118.8 (4.68) | 96.5 (3.80) | 95.7 (3.77) | 83.9 (3.30) | 101.8 (4.01) | 122.1 (4.81) | 139.5 (5.49) | 108.8 (4.28) | 1,245.3 (49.03) |
| Average snowfall cm (inches) | 43.6 (17.2) | 29.9 (11.8) | 25.2 (9.9) | 5.7 (2.2) | 0.3 (0.1) | 0.0 (0.0) | 0.0 (0.0) | 0.0 (0.0) | 0.0 (0.0) | 0.0 (0.0) | 7.8 (3.1) | 23.8 (9.4) | 136.3 (53.7) |
| Average precipitation days (≥ 0.2 mm) | 10.9 | 8.7 | 10.8 | 11.8 | 13.2 | 11.8 | 10.1 | 9.2 | 9.9 | 11.3 | 12.3 | 10.7 | 130.7 |
| Average rainy days (≥ 0.2 mm) | 6.3 | 5.3 | 8.3 | 11.3 | 13.1 | 11.8 | 10.1 | 9.2 | 9.9 | 11.3 | 11.7 | 8.2 | 116.4 |
| Average snowy days (≥ 0.2 cm) | 5.8 | 4.2 | 3.1 | 1.1 | 0.08 | 0.0 | 0.0 | 0.0 | 0.0 | 0.0 | 1.2 | 3.6 | 19.1 |
Source: Environment Canada
