= South Section, Nova Scotia =

Community in Nova Scotia, Canada

Coordinates: 45°1′0.88″N 63°10′1.08″W

South Section in Nova Scotia

South Section' is a community on the Eastern Shore of the Halifax Regional Municipality in the Canadian province of Nova Scotia in the Musquodoboit Valley.
