= Barkhouse Settlement, Nova Scotia =

Community in Nova Scotia, Canada

Coordinates: 44°56′19.3″N 62°22′40.1″W

Barkhouse Settlement in Nova Scotia

Barkhouse Settlement is a rural community on the Eastern Shore of the Halifax Regional Municipality in the Canadian province of Nova Scotia.
