= East Petpeswick, Nova Scotia =

Coordinates: 44°45′15.3″N 63°9′16.4″W

East Petpeswick in Nova Scotia

East Petpeswick is a rural community of the Halifax Regional Municipality in the Canadian province of Nova Scotia on the Eastern Shore.

In Ponta da Bretanha Azores, a sign announces the relative distance is 3,215 km.
