= Bear Cove, Halifax, Nova Scotia =

Community in Nova Scotia, Canada

Coordinates: 44°31′50.81″N 63°32′21.94″W

Bear Cove in Nova Scotia

Bear Cove is a rural community of the Halifax Regional Municipality in the Canadian province of Nova Scotia on the Chebucto Peninsula.
