= Whites Lake, Nova Scotia =

Whites Lake, (Nova Scotia) could mean the following :

== Community ==
- Whites Lake a community in the Halifax Regional Municipality at 44°31′43″N 63°45′32″W
Community of Whites Lake in Nova Scotia

== Lakes ==
=== Guysborough County ===
- Whites Lake a lake near the community of East Ennville at 45°20′27″N 61°44′14″W

=== Halifax Regional Municipality ===
- Whites Lake a lake near the first nations reserve Shubenacadie 13 at 44°55′8″N 63°37′52″W
- Whites Lake a lake near the residential community of Whites Lake at 44°32′3″N 63°45′17″W

=== Richmond ===
- Whites Lake a lake near the community of Whiteside at 45°36′57″N 61°9′9″W

=== Shelburne County ===
- Whites Lake a lake near the community of Sable River at 43°58′21″N 65°19′52″W
