= Myers Point, Nova Scotia =

Coordinates: 44°46′21.5″N 63°2′26.8″W

Myers Point in Nova Scotia

Myers Point is a community of the Halifax Regional Municipality in the Canadian province of Nova Scotia.
