= East Dover, Nova Scotia =

East Dover
- Rural Community
- Location in Nova Scotia East Dover (Canada)
- Coordinates: 44°29′42.4″N 63°50′56.5″W
- Country: Canada
- Province: Nova Scotia
- Municipality: Halifax Regional Municipality
- Time zone: Atlantic Standard Time

East Dover is a rural community of the Halifax Regional Municipality in the Canadian province of Nova Scotia on the Chebucto Peninsula. It was probably named for Dover in Kent, England.
