= Lower Three Fathom Harbour, Nova Scotia =

Community in Nova Scotia, Canada

Coordinates: 44°38′15.9″N 63°17′33.5″W

Lower Three Fathom Harbour in Nova Scotia

Lower Three Fathom Harbour is a community of the Halifax Regional Municipality in the Canadian province of Nova Scotia.
