= Ostrea Lake, Nova Scotia =

Community in Halifax, Canada

Coordinates: 44°43′20″N 63°5′18.3″W

Ostrea Lake in Nova Scotia

Ostrea Lake is a community of the Halifax Regional Municipality in the Canadian province of Nova Scotia.
