= Lower East Chezzetcook, Nova Scotia =

Community in Nova Scotia, Canada

Coordinates: 44°42′0.1″N 63°12′41.7″W

Lower East Chezzetcook in Nova Scotia

Lower East Chezzetcook (English: /ˈtʃɛzəkʊk/) is a rural community of the Halifax Regional Municipality in the Canadian province of Nova Scotia.
