= Lake Charlotte, Nova Scotia =

Community in Nova Scotia, Canada

Lake Charlotte
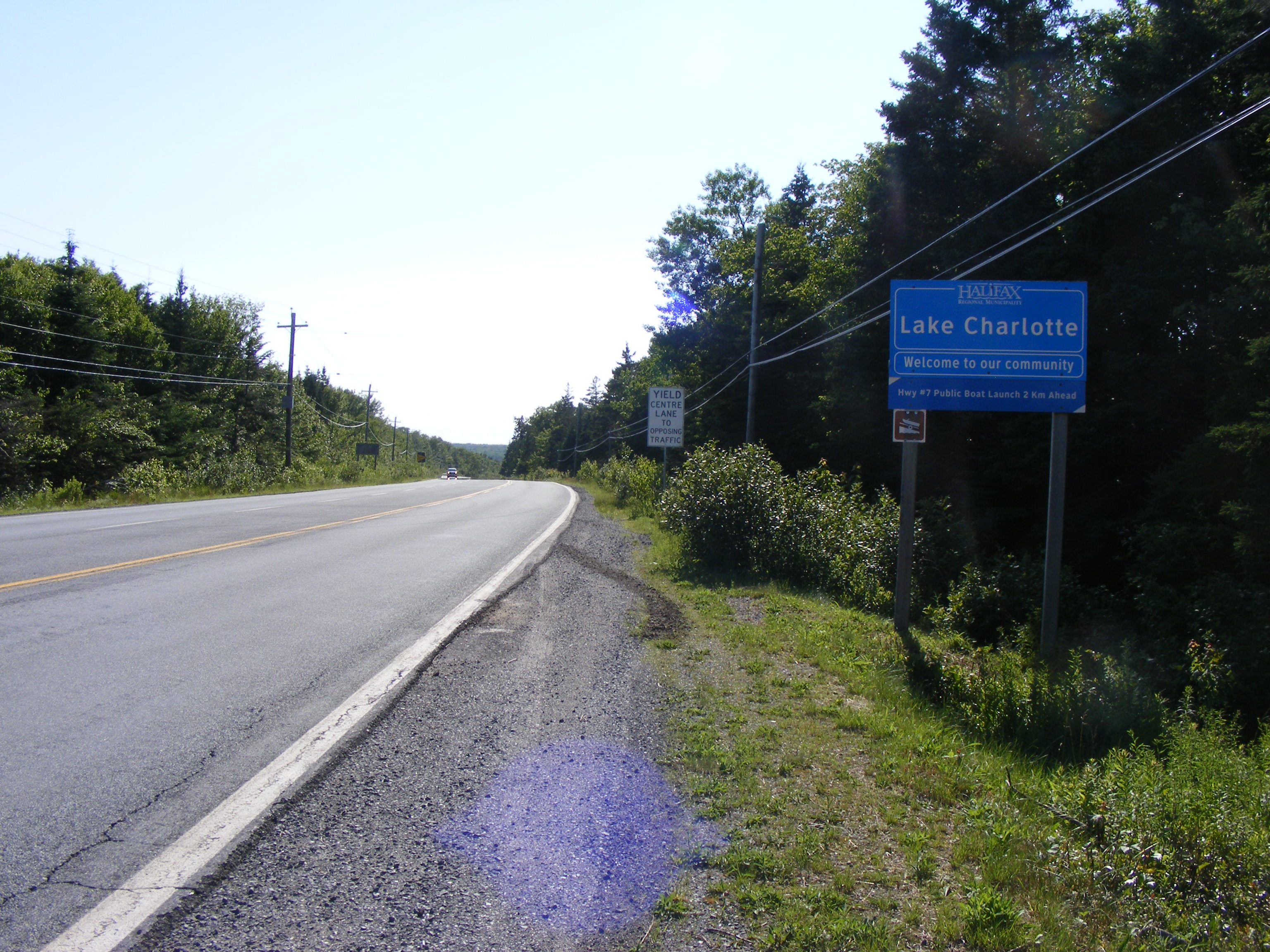

- Location within Nova Scotia Location within Canada
- Coordinates: 44°46′03″N 62°57′05″W

Lake Charlotte is a rural cottage community on the Eastern Shore of the Halifax Regional Municipality, Nova Scotia, Canada. The community is located on the junction of Trunk 7 and Clam Harbour Road, 58.23 kilometers from Downtown Halifax.

== Lake ==
Lake Charlotte
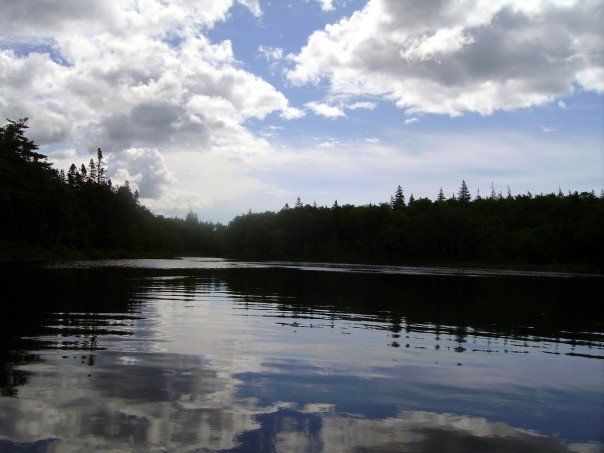

- Lake Charlotte in Nova Scotia
- Location: Halifax County, Nova Scotia
- Coordinates: 44°50′30″N 62°58′30″W
- Type: Glacial Lake
- Basin countries: Canada
- Max. length: 15 km (9.3 mi)
- Max. width: 2 km (1.2 mi)
- Max. depth: 48 m (157 ft)
- Surface elevation: 6 m (20 ft)
- Islands: many small islands around the midpoint of the lake
- Settlements: Lake Charlotte, Nova Scotia, Upper Lakeville, Nova Scotia

Lake Charlotte, also known as Lac Charlotte (French) is a lake for which the community is named, is a relatively deep lake by Nova Scotian standards. Reaching a maximum depth of 48 meters in the deepest point, and with many areas of the north half featuring depths in excess of 20 meters, it is deeper than Kejimkujik Lake, Nova Scotia's largest natural lake, and Lake Ainslie, Nova Scotia's second-largest lake. The lake is popular with recreational boaters, as well, during the summer months.

== Communications ==
- The postal code is B0J 2L0.
- The telephone exchange is 902 845 -Aliant;

== Demographics ==
- Total population – 821
- Total dwellings – 389
- Total businesses – 15
- Total land area – 108.259 km^{2}

== Attractions ==
There is a 750 hectares (1,900 acres) provincial park reserve at Lake Charlotte that offers backcountry hiking and camping, carry-in and boat launch potential and winter recreation. It was acquired by the Province of Nova Scotia in the mid-1970s as part of its commitment to establish an Eastern Shore Seaside Park System.

There is also a Memory Lane Heritage Village Museum in Lake Charlotte.
