= Oldham, Nova Scotia =

Community of the Halifax Regional Municipality in Nova Scotia, Canada

Coordinates: 44°54′57.1″N 63°30′0″W

Oldham in Nova Scotia

Oldham is a community of the Halifax Regional Municipality in the Canadian province of Nova Scotia. It was named for Oldham in the Lancashire area.

Oldham was a gold mining community in the 1930s and 1940s. It is located about 2.5 km from the local town of Enfield. Oldham was a place for travellers to stop while en route from the Guysbrough Rd to Enfield, Halifax, and other surrounding areas. The family name Cole is prominent in the community with many other family names such as Whidden, Chaplin, Graham, Miuse, McPhail, Dowell, Dunfords, Publicover, Browns, Reeves. Many families are related to each other and Oldham is a tight-knit community. Baseball and hockey were also games that the kids would play on the dirt road and in the fields.
