= Smith Settlement, Nova Scotia =

Coordinates: 44°46′50.22″N 63°6′1.15″W

Smiths Settlement in Nova Scotia

Smiths Settlement is a small rural community located in the Halifax Regional Municipality in Nova Scotia, Canada. It is located along Route 207, which is a winding two-lane road that runs through the community. The surrounding countryside is known for its forests, fields, and streams. There are a few small businesses in the community, including a gas station, a general store, and a post office. The community is home to a small number of residents, many of whom are involved in agriculture or forestry. There are several churches and a community hall in the area.
