= Pace Settlement, Nova Scotia =

Coordinates: 44°59′18″N 62°10′46″W

Pace Settlement in Nova Scotia

Pace Settlement is a community of the Halifax Regional Municipality in the Canadian province of Nova Scotia.
