= Big Lake, Nova Scotia =

Lake in Nova Scotia, Canada

Coordinates: 44°31′37.9″N 63°51′48.4″W

Big Lake in Nova Scotia

Big Lake is a rural community and lake of the Halifax Regional Municipality in the Canadian province of Nova Scotia.
