= West Petpeswick, Nova Scotia =

Coordinates: 44°44′32.4″N 63°10′11″W

West Petpeswick in Nova Scotia

West Petpeswick is a rural community of the Halifax Regional Municipality in the Canadian province of Nova Scotia.
