= Jacket Lake, Nova Scotia =

Place in Canada

Coordinates: 44°53′28.5″N 62°41′36.5″W

Jacket Lake in Nova Scotia

Jacket Lake is a rural community of the Halifax Regional Municipality in the Canadian province of Nova Scotia.
