= Debaies Cove, Nova Scotia =

Community in Nova Scotia, Canada

Coordinates: 44°45′16.6″N 62°49′19″W

Debaies Cove in Nova Scotia

Debaies Cove is a rural community of the Halifax Regional Municipality in the Canadian province of Nova Scotia.

The roots of the settlement trace back before 1820 to Jean DeBay, He was a fisherman likely to be of French origin. The DeBaie is an anglicized version of his name. There are ruminants of a WWII observation station located here.
