= Glen Moir, Nova Scotia =

Glen Moir
- Neighbourhood
- Location within Nova Scotia
- Country: Canada
- Province: Nova Scotia
- Municipality: Halifax Regional Municipality

Area
  - Total: 3.12 km^{2} (1.20 sq mi)
- Area code: 782, 902
- GNBC code: CBMLN

Glen Moir is a subdivision in Bedford, Nova Scotia, Canada within the Halifax Regional Municipality, located between the Highway 102 in the west, Bedford Highway (Trunk 2) in the east, Meadowbook Dr in the North and the Hammonds Plains Road in the South. It occupies about 312 ha (770 acres) of land.
