= Newcomb Corner, Nova Scotia =

Newcomb Corner
- Location of Newcomb Corner in Nova Scotia
- Coordinates: 45°4′14″N 63°2′52″W
- Country: Canada
- Province: Nova Scotia
- Administrative district: Halifax Regional Municipality
- Elevation: 10 m (33 ft)
- Highest elevation: 64 m (210 ft)
- Lowest elevation: 0 m (0 ft)
- Time zone: UTC−4 (ATS)
  - Summer (DST): UTC−3 (Atlantic Daylight Saving Time)
- Postal code: B0N 1X0
- Area code: 902
- Highways: Route 224

Newcomb Corner is a community of the Halifax Regional Municipality in the Canadian province of Nova Scotia.
