= Owls Head, Halifax, Nova Scotia =

Coordinates: 44.74673°N 62.8500°W

Owls Head in Nova Scotia

Owls Head is a community of the Halifax Regional Municipality in the Canadian province of Nova Scotia.
