= Murphy Cove, Nova Scotia =

Coordinates: 44°47′13.9″N 62°45′35.69″W

Murphy Cove in Nova Scotia

Murphy Cove is a community on the Eastern Shore of Nova Scotia, Canada, in the Halifax Regional Municipality. The community is located on the Marine Drive on Nova Scotia Trunk 7, about 31 km (19 mi) west of Sheet Harbour, Nova Scotia. The community is named for Thomas Murphy, an Irish settler. The community is situated on the shores of Shoal Bay, an inlet of the Atlantic Ocean. Settlement in the area began in the 1830s.
