= Glen Margaret, Nova Scotia =

Community in Nova Scotia, Canada

Coordinates: 44°34′45.1″N 63°54′45.5″W

Glen Margaret in Nova Scotia

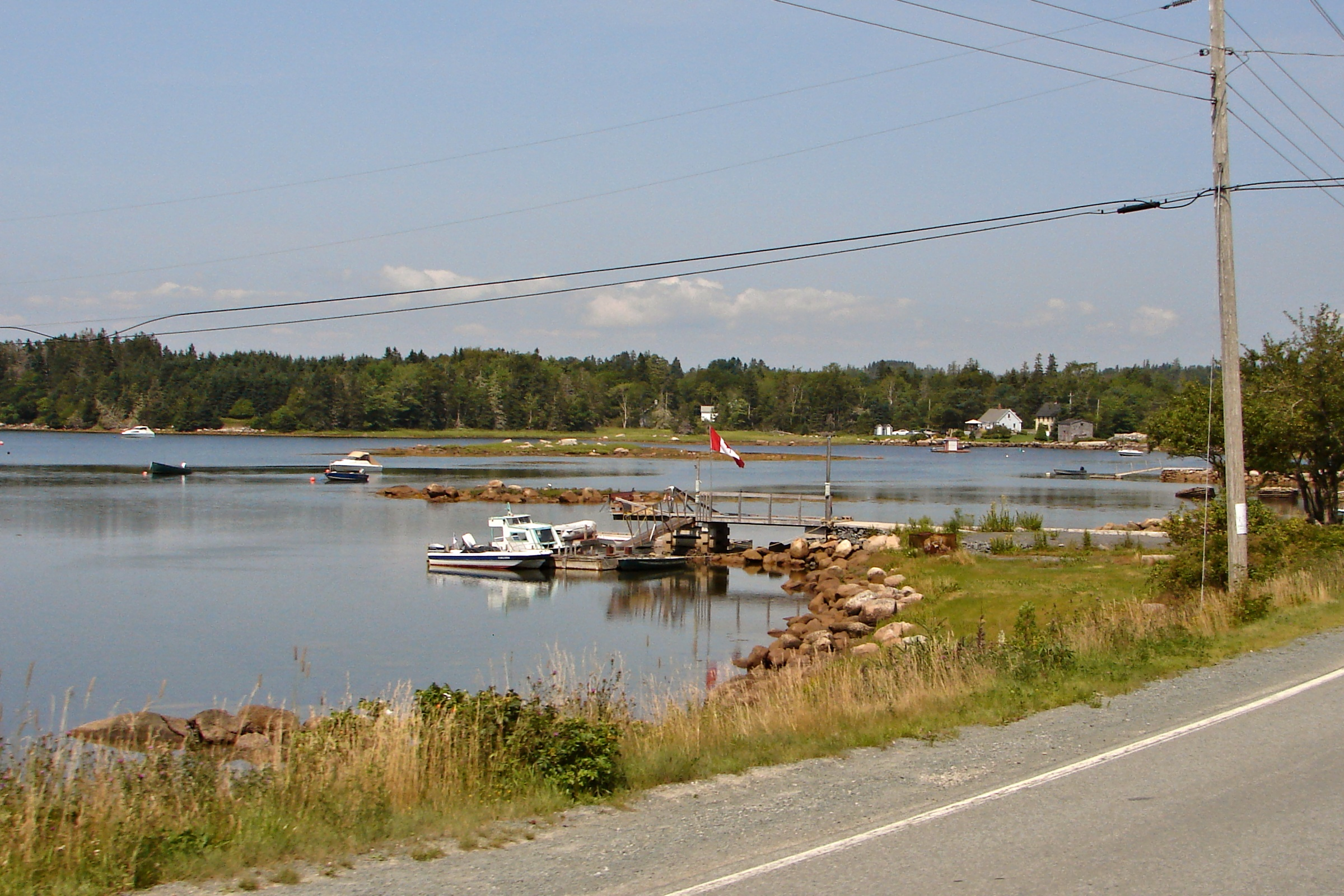
Glen Margaret

Glen Margaret is a rural community of the Halifax Regional Municipality in the Canadian province of Nova Scotia. It was first inhabited by the Mi'kmaq who spent their summers along the coast to catch a fresh supply of fish. The first overseas settlers arrived during the late 18th century and by the early 19th century a number of land grants attracted permanent residents.

Today, the community is the home of a number of creative persons such as artists, publishers and authors.
