= Goodwood, Nova Scotia =

Coordinates: 44°37′6.7″N 63°40′1.1″W

Goodwood in Nova Scotia

Goodwood is a suburban community of the Halifax Regional Municipality in the Canadian province of Nova Scotia.
