= Southwest Cove, Halifax County, Nova Scotia =

Southwest Cove is a Canadian rural community located in Halifax County, Nova Scotia. It has a population of 23.

Southwest Cove in Nova Scotia
