= River Lake, Nova Scotia =

Community in Nova Scotia, Canada

Coordinates: 45°11′6.8″N 62°48′35.9″W

River Lake in Nova Scotia

Entrance to River Lake.

River Lake is a community of the Halifax Regional Municipality in the Canadian province of Nova Scotia.
