= Middle Porters Lake, Nova Scotia =

Community in Nova Scotia, Canada

Coordinates: 44°42′16.1″N 63°18′21.4″W

Middle Porters Lake in Nova Scotia

Middle Porters Lake is a rural community of the Halifax Regional Municipality in the Canadian province of Nova Scotia.
