= East Pennant, Nova Scotia =

Coordinates: 44°27′58″N 63°37′50″W

East Pennant in Nova Scotia

East Pennant is a rural community on the Chebucto Peninsula in the Halifax Regional Municipality Nova Scotia on the shore of the Atlantic Ocean on the East Pennant Road off of Route 349.

== Communications ==
- Telephone exchange 902 - 868
- First three digits of postal code - B3V
