= Halibut Bay, Nova Scotia =

Community in Nova Scotia, Canada

Coordinates: 44°32′59.2″N 63°33′27.1″W

Halibut Bay in Nova Scotia

Halibut Bay is a rural community of the Halifax Regional Municipality in the Canadian province of Nova Scotia.
