= Mitchell Bay, Nova Scotia =

Coordinates: 44°56′44″N 62°10′41.4″W

Mitchell Bay in Nova Scotia

Mitchell Bay is a rural community of the Halifax Regional Municipality in the Canadian province of Nova Scotia.
