= Conrod Settlement, Nova Scotia =

Community in Nova Scotia, Canada

Coordinates: 44°45′50.9″N 63°14′26.8″W

Conrod Settlement in Nova Scotia

Conrod Settlement is a rural community in the Canadian province of Nova Scotia, located in the Halifax Regional Municipality.
