= Blind Bay, Nova Scotia =

Community in Nova Scotia, Canada

Coordinates: 44°30′42.5″N 63°49′9.1″W

Blind Bay in Nova Scotia

Blind Bay is a community of the Halifax Regional Municipality in the Canadian province of Nova Scotia.
