= Lower Ship Harbour, Nova Scotia =

Rural community in Nova Scotia, Canada

Coordinates: 44°47′5.9″N 62°50′6.8″W

Lower Ship Harbour in Nova Scotia

Lower Ship Harbour is a rural community of the Halifax Regional Municipality in the Canadian province of Nova Scotia. Lower Ship Harbour is home to The Deanery Project. This non-profit organization acts as a community centre and hall for events on the Eastern Shore of Nova Scotia.
