= Sambro Creek, Nova Scotia =

Community in Nova Scotia, Canada

Coordinates: 44°26′31.9″N 63°38′1.3″W

Sambro Creek in Nova Scotia

Sambro Creek is a community of the Halifax Regional Municipality in the Canadian province of Nova Scotia.
