= Fletchers Lake, Nova Scotia =

Community in Nova Scotia, Canada

Coordinates: 44°49′40.5″N 63°36′42.2″W

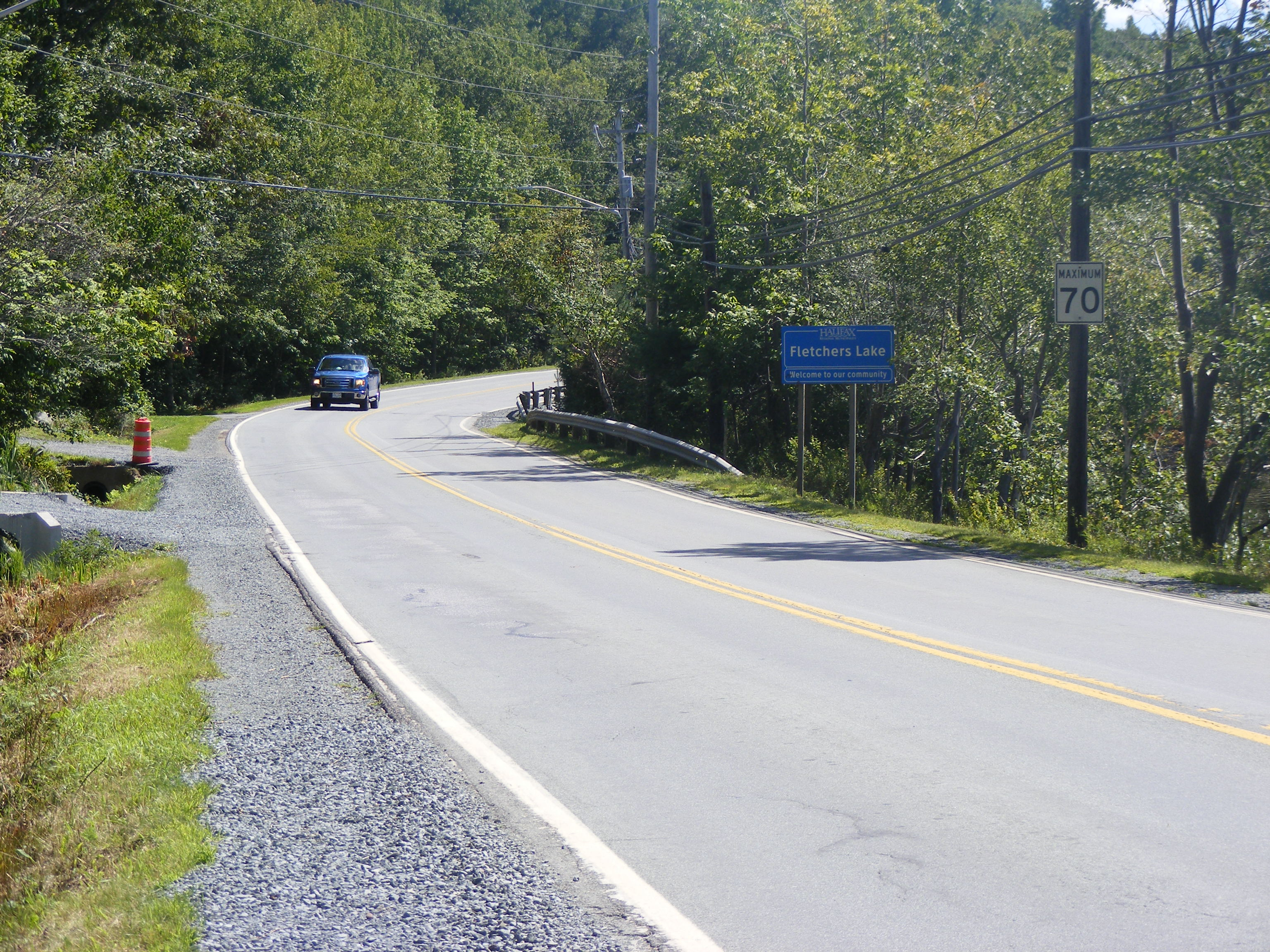
Fletchers Lake, August 2023.

Fletchers Lake in Nova Scotia

Fletchers Lake is a suburban community of the Halifax Regional Municipality in the Canadian province of Nova Scotia.
