= Ten Mile Lake, Nova Scotia =

Coordinates: 45°8′31.2″N 62°42′43.1″W

Ten Mile Lake in Nova Scotia

Ten Mile Lake is a rural community of the Halifax Regional Municipality in the Canadian province of Nova Scotia.
