= Murchyville, Nova Scotia =

Coordinates: 45°0′34.3″N 63°8′8.7″W

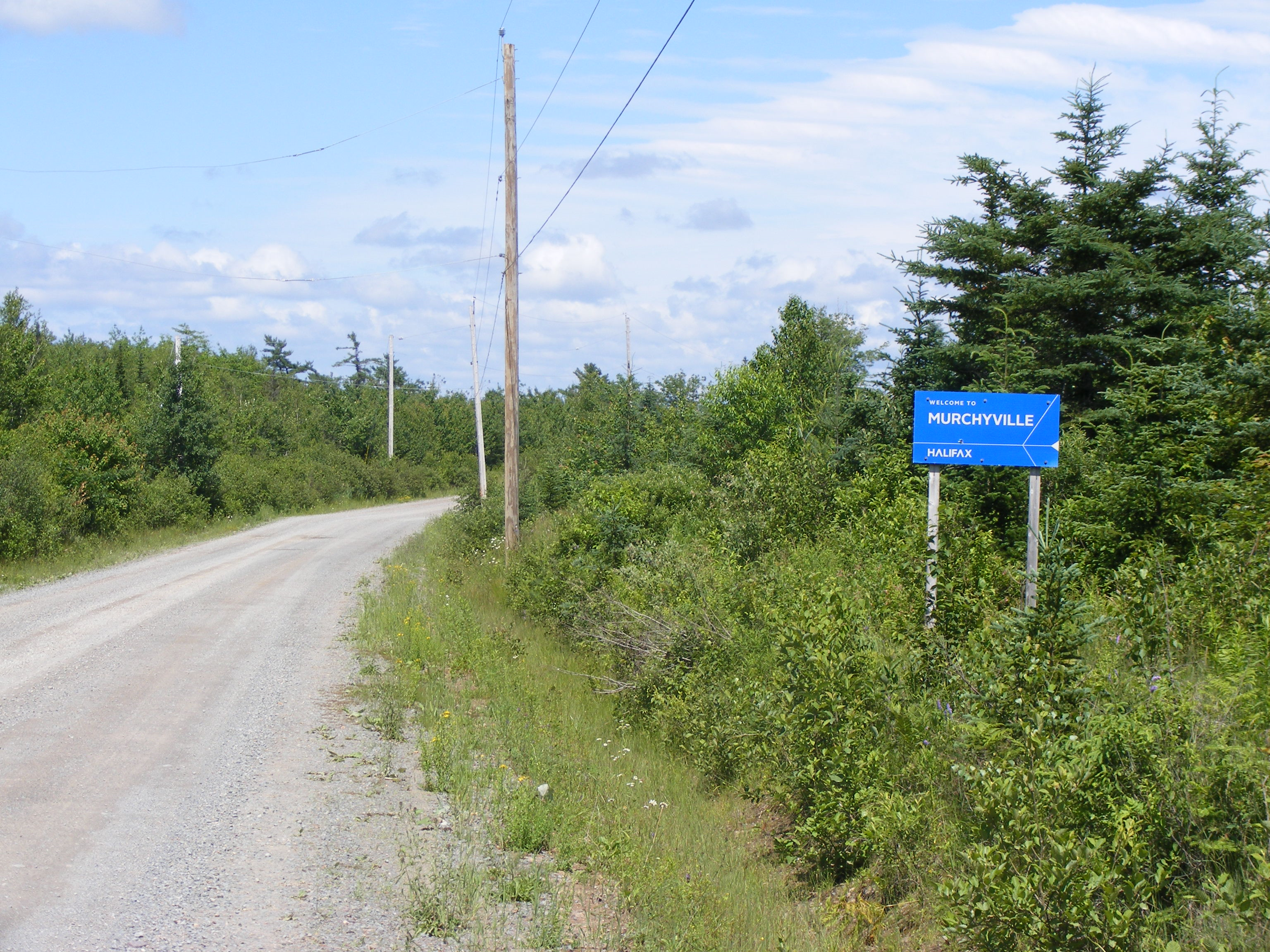
Murchyville, July 2023.

Murchyville in Nova Scotia

Murchyville is a community of the Halifax Regional Municipality in the Canadian province of Nova Scotia.
