= Lake Echo, Nova Scotia =

Community in Nova Scotia, Canada

Lake Echo
- Location within Nova Scotia
- Coordinates: 44°44′24.37″N 63°23′9.25″W
- Country: Canada
- Province: Nova Scotia
- Municipality: Halifax Regional Municipality
- District: 3

Government
  - Type: Regional Council
  - Governing Council: Halifax Regional Council
  - Community Council: Marine Drive Valley & Canal

Area
  - City: 8.84 km^{2} (3.41 sq mi)
  - Urban: 4.76 km^{2} (1.84 sq mi)
- Highest elevation: 130 m (430 ft)
- Lowest elevation: 12 m (39 ft)

Population (2021)
  - City: 2,365
  - Density: 496.5/km^{2} (1,286/sq mi)
- Time zone: UTC-4 (AST)
  - Summer (DST): UTC-3 (ADT)
- Canadian Postal code: B3Z
- Area code: 902
- Telephone Exchange: 829
- Part of a series about Places in Nova Scotia

Lake Echo is an unincorporated community in the Canadian province of Nova Scotia, located in the Halifax Regional Municipality.

The area is mostly residential, with several subdivisions built in the 60's by Faber Construction LTD as well as in the 1980s and 1990s.

== 2008 fire ==
On June 13, 2008 a forest fire broke out near Porters Lake, destroying two houses, damaging several others and burning six thousand acres of forest in total. The fire was believed to be caused by a camp fire and the Royal Canadian Mounted Police laid no charges however it was determined that residue from Hurricane Juan fuelled the fire. The fire was the largest in an urban area fought in Nova Scotia and the largest fire in 30 years.
