= West Porters Lake, Nova Scotia =

Community in Nova Scotia, Canada

Coordinates: 44°44′15.2″N 63°18′39.6″W

West Porters Lake in Nova Scotia

West Porters Lake is a rural community of the Halifax Regional Municipality in the Canadian province of Nova Scotia.
