= Glenmore, Nova Scotia =

Coordinates: 45°4′15.1″N 63°8′59.3″W

Glenmore in Nova Scotia

Glenmore is a rural community of the Halifax Regional Municipality in the Canadian province of Nova Scotia.
