= Upper Lakeville =

Coordinates: 44°46′59″N 62°57′59″W

Upper Lakeville in Nova Scotia

Upper Lakeville is a small cottage community on the Eastern Shore (Nova Scotia), which includes a blend of summer cottages and year-round homes. It is located on the Western shore of Lake Charlotte. Upper Lakeville is one of the many small rural communities that are included in the Halifax Regional Municipality Nova Scotia. Upper Lakeville road is located at its junction with Trunk 7, 55.3 km from Dartmouth, Nova Scotia, and 58.9 km from the City of Halifax, on the stretch of Marine Drive running between Musquodoboit Harbour and Sheet Harbour. It terminates at E & F Webber Lakeside Park campgrounds. The only public access to the lake in Upper Lakeville is at E & F Webber Lakeside Park campgrounds.

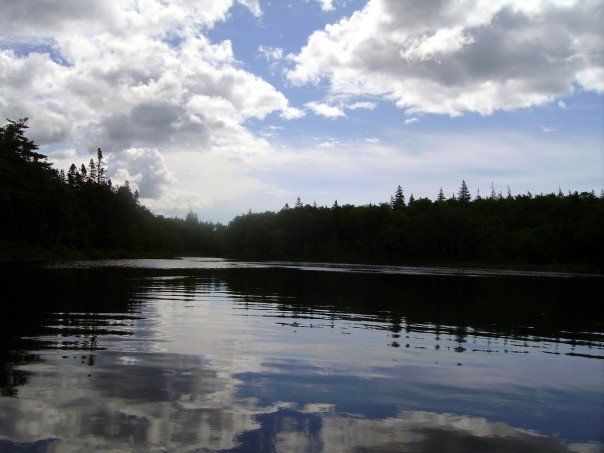
Lake Charlotte, in Upper Lakeville

== Communications ==
The postal code is B0J 2L0
The telephone exchange is 902 845 -Aliant.
