= Mill Lake, Nova Scotia =

Rural community in Nova Scotia, Canada

Coordinates: 45°7′33.6″N 62°54′39.9″W

Mill Lake in Nova Scotia

Mill Lake is a rural community of the Halifax Regional Municipality, in the Canadian province of Nova Scotia. The lake is located just 45 minutes from the vibrant city of Halifax.
