= Montague Gold Mines, Nova Scotia =

Community in Nova Scotia, Canada

Coordinates: 44°43′06″N 63°30′48″W

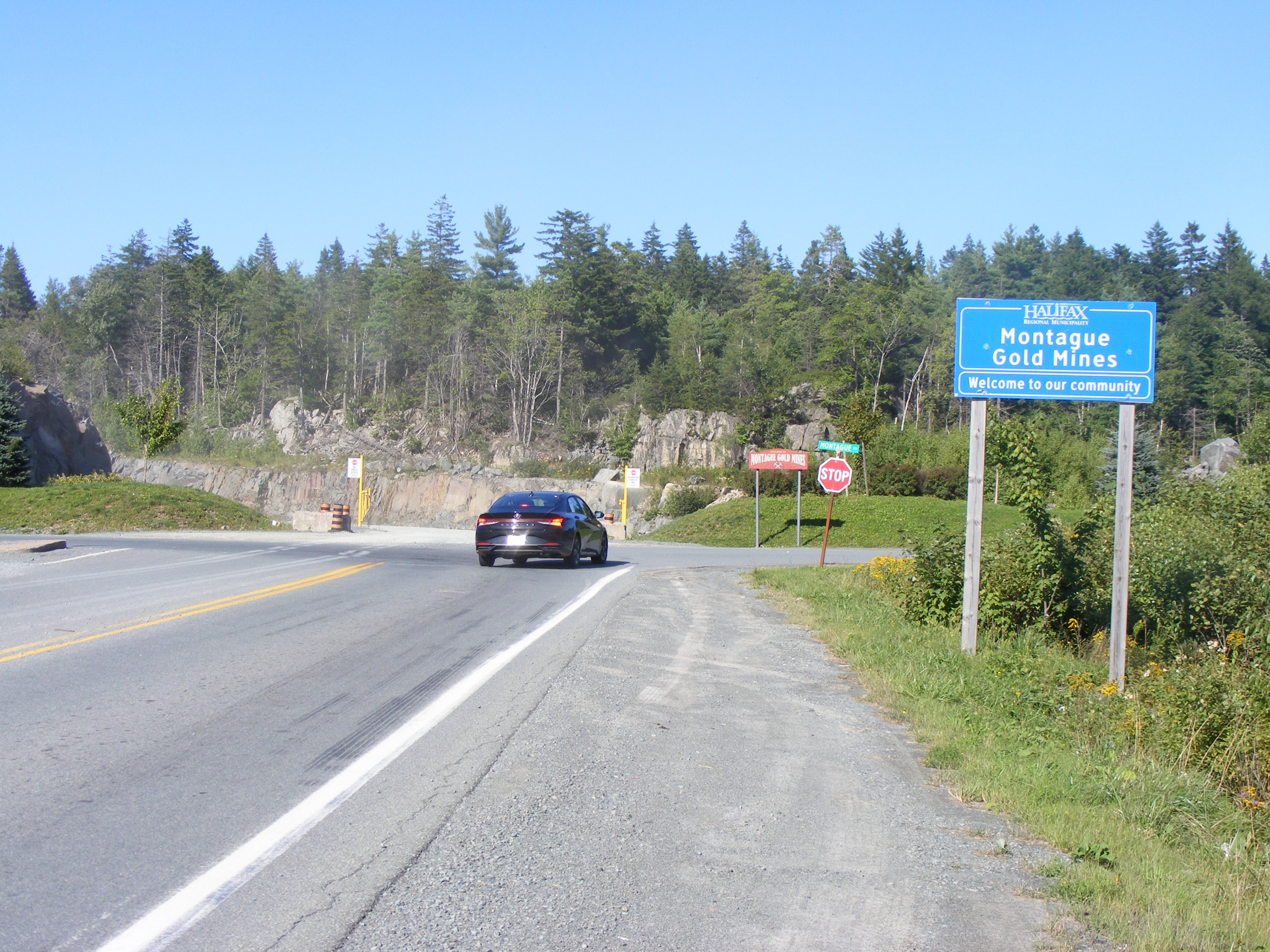
Montague Gold Mines, August 2023.

Montague Gold Mines in Nova Scotia

Montague Gold Mines (located at 44°43'06"N, 63°30'48"W) is a rural community in the Halifax Regional Municipality of Nova Scotia, located on the Montague Road off of exit 14 of Highway 107 three kilometers from Dartmouth.

== History ==
The community draws its name from the discovery of gold in 1863, but its history goes back as far as the 1780s, when the Honorable Charles Morris, Surveyor-General of Nova Scotia, received a land grant of 900 acres (3.6 km^{2}) to the east of Lake Loon. The community grew with the gold mine; however, when the mine closed, the economy was based on lumbering and farming. Today, Montague Gold Mines is a small residential area with easy access to Dartmouth through Highway 107 and Route 318.

In 2018 the Government of Nova Scotia initiated the process of closing the former gold mining site that is heavily contaminated with arsenic and mercury.
