= Little Harbour, Halifax, Nova Scotia =

Community in Nova Scotia, Canada

Little Harbour
- Location within Nova Scotia
- Coordinates: 44°42′38″N 62°50′25″W
- Country: Canada
- Province: Nova Scotia
- Municipality: Halifax Regional Municipality
- District: 1

Government
  - Type: Regional Council
  - Governing Council: Halifax Regional Council
  - Community Council: Marine Drive Valley & Canal

Area
  - Total: 26.57 km^{2} (10.26 sq mi)
- Highest elevation: 12 m (39 ft)
- Lowest elevation: 0 m (0 ft)
- Time zone: UTC-4 (AST)
  - Summer (DST): UTC-3 (ADT)
- Canadian Postal code: B0J 1Y0
- Telephone Exchange: 902 845
- GNBC Code: CBUKS
- Part of a series about Places in Nova Scotia

Little Harbour is a community on the Eastern Shore region of the Halifax Regional Municipality in Nova Scotia, Canada on the Little Harbour Road off Trunk 7, 84 kilometers (51 miles) from Dartmouth.

The area is home to Owls Head Provincial Park.
