= Liscomb Sanctuary, Nova Scotia =

Coordinates: 45°6′34″N 62°29′16.3″W

Liscomb Sanctuary in Nova Scotia

Liscomb Sanctuary is a rural area of the Halifax Regional Municipality in the Canadian province of Nova Scotia. It is in the same area as the Liscomb Game Sanctuary, but their boundaries are not identical.

Nova Scotia Route 374 runs north–south through Liscomb Sanctuary.
