= Brookvale, Nova Scotia =

Community in Nova Scotia, Canada

Coordinates: 45°2′20.5″N 63°7′14.7″W

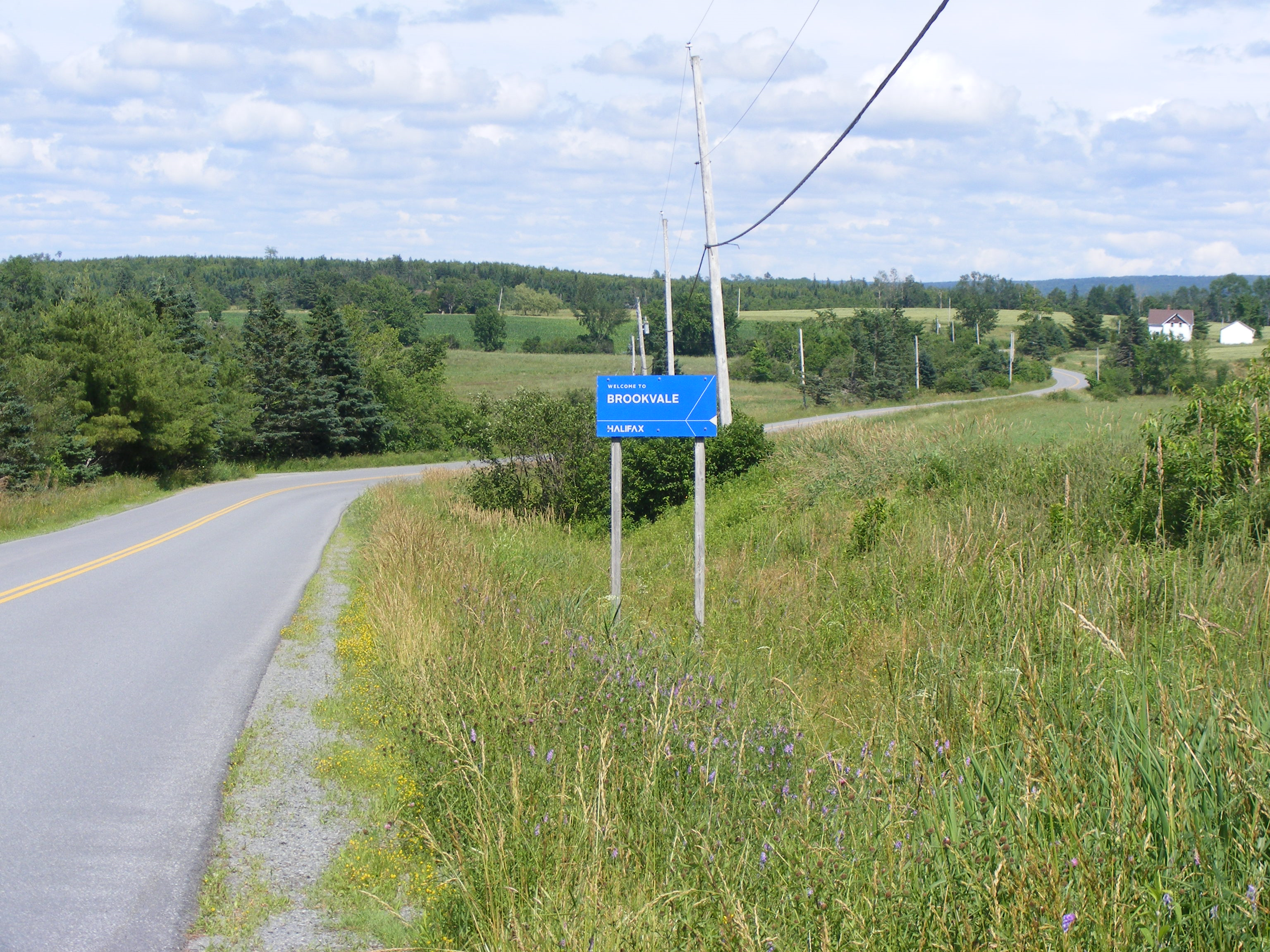
Brookvale, July 2023.

Brookvale in Nova Scotia

Brookvale is a rural community of the Halifax Regional Municipality in the Canadian province of Nova Scotia.
