= Chaplin, Nova Scotia =

Community in Nova Scotia, Canada

Coordinates: 45°12′21″N 62°51′07″W

Bald Rock in Nova Scotia

Chaplin is a community in the Canadian province of Nova Scotia, located in the Halifax Regional Municipality.

== Communications ==
- Telephone exchange 902 - 568
- postal code - B0N 2M0
