= Sambro, Nova Scotia =

Sambro
- Community
- Location within Nova Scotia
- Coordinates: 44°28′46″N 63°36′32″W
- Country: Canada
- Province: Nova Scotia
- Municipality: Halifax Regional Municipality
- District: 11
- Founded: 1755

Government
  - Type: Regional Council
  - Governing Council: Halifax Regional Council
  - Community Council: Chebucto Community Council

Area
  - Total: 7.7 km^{2} (3.0 sq mi)
- Highest elevation: 31 m (102 ft)
- Lowest elevation: 0 m (0 ft)
- Time zone: UTC-4 (AST)
  - Summer (DST): UTC-3 (ADT)
- Canadian Postal code: B3V
- Telephone Exchange: 902 868
- GNBC Code: CBHBV

Sambro is a rural fishing community on the Chebucto Peninsula in the Halifax Regional Municipality, in Nova Scotia, Canada. It is on the Atlantic Ocean at the head of Sambro Harbour, immediately west of the entrance to Halifax Harbour. Sambro is at the end of Route 306.

Sambro Island is within the community southeast of the harbour and is home to the Sambro Island Lighthouse, the oldest operational lighthouse in the Americas (since 1758). It stands 19 metres (62 ft) on the top of the rocky island. The original lens from the lighthouse is on display at the Maritime Museum of the Atlantic in Halifax.

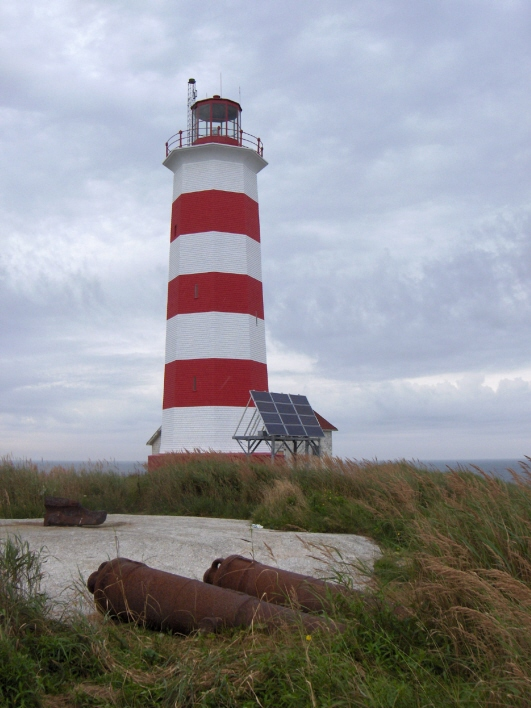
Sambro Island Light, built 1758, with 18th-century fog cannons

Sambro Harbour also has a small pepperpot style lighthouse located at the harbour entrance.

== Etymology ==
Sesambre, "an island thus named by some Mallouins, distant 15 leagues from La Héve," says Champlain. Laverdière thus explains the name: "In remembrance of a small island of that name which lies in front of St. Malo (now Cézembre). Sésambre became S. Sambre; and the English sailors, who are not greatly devoted to the saints, have called it simply Sambro.

- 1612: Sesembre
- 1660: Sesembre
- 1733: Sambro (British)
- 1741: Sambro (British)
- 1744: Sincembre
- 1747: Cincembre
- 1753: Sincembre
- 1755: Sambro
- 1761: Sincembre
- 1761: Sambro

Mi'kmaq: Meseebakun.uk (`the constant mocker`)

== History ==
Three years after the founding of Halifax in 1752, 26 families settled and worked on Sambro Island after Governor Edward Cornwallis saw the need to populate the area with British settlers to prevent a French attack by sea. The community has evolved into a fishing and tourist community over the centuries, although many residents currently commute into Halifax for employment.

On 13 May 1759, Major John Moncrief met Admiral Holmes off of Cape Sambro with two ships, HMS Somerset and HMS Terrible, before proceeding to Louisbourg, then Quebec, leading up to the Battle of the Plains of Abraham in the Seven Years' War.

During the American Revolution, Sambro witnessed numerous naval battles, such as the Battle off Halifax. On 10 July 1780, the British privateer Resolution (16 guns) under the command of Thomas Ross engaged the American privateer Viper (16 guns) off of Halifax at Sambro Light. There was another engagement, described as "one of the bloodiest battles in the history of privateering". The two privateers began a "severe engagement", in which each pounded the other with cannon fire for about 90 minutes. The death toll was 18 British and 33 Americans. (Note: There are varying reports on the casualties. Another source indicates that the Americans reported between 3 died (British reporting 30 American died), while British reported 8 killed and 10 wounded.)

On 1 September 1782 the American privateer Wasp sailed to Pennant Point where they were confronted by three men from Sambro who fired on them, killing one of his crew and wounding three others including Captain Thomas Thompson. Captain Perry took command of the vessel and the privateers took one of the Sambro men prisoner. The privateers buried their crew member on an island in Pennant Bay. They then began their return to Massachusetts by rowing to West Dover, Nova Scotia and then on to Cross Island ("Croo Island") just off Lunenburg ("Malegash").

During the American Civil War, Sambro played a pivotal role in the Chesapeake Affair. A Union vessel was stolen by a crew Confederate sympathisers who were loading the vessel with coal at Sambro for the journey to the Confederate states. Union Navy warships intercepted the vessel and eventually took it to Halifax.

== Shipwrecks ==
In World War I, on 2 July 1918 SS City of Vienna hit the rocks on Sambro Island. All on-board were rescued. On 5 August 1918 the British tanker Luz Blanca was hit by a torpedo fired by the German U-boat U-156 on her way to Halifax. Her crew took to the lifeboats and began rowing for the Sambro light, 27 kilometres (17 mi) away. All survived

In World War II, on 26 March 1941 HMCS Otter caught fire from a wiring issue and abandoned ship 11 kilometres (6.8 mi) south of Sambro Island. 19 died when a lifeboat capsized. On 24 December 1944 HMCS Clayoquot was hit aft by a torpedo fired by U-806. Eight sailors were killed. On 16 April 1945 HMCS Esquimalt was hit by a torpedo fired by U-190. 44 crew died from exposure. 26 survived. After the war, on 21 October 1947, as part of Operation Scuttled, the surrendered U-190 was scuttled at about the same position as where HMCS Esquimalt was sunk.

== See also ==
- List of communities in Nova Scotia
