= Governor Lake, Nova Scotia =

Community in Nova Scotia, Canada

Coordinates: 45°10′24.2″N 62°37′51.4″W

Governor Lake in Nova Scotia

Governor Lake is a rural community in the Canadian province of Nova Scotia, located in the Halifax Regional Municipality. It is named after a nearby lake.
