= College Lake, Nova Scotia =

Community in Nova Scotia, Canada

Coordinates: 45°13′4.5″N 62°47′33.9″W

College Lake in Nova Scotia

College Lake is a rural community of the Halifax Regional Municipality in the Canadian province of Nova Scotia.
