= Clam Harbour, Nova Scotia =

Community in Nova Scotia, Canada

Coordinates: 44°44′12″N 62°52′45″W

Clam Harbour in Nova Scotia

Clam Harbour is a rural community on the Eastern Shore region of the Halifax Regional Municipality, Nova Scotia, Canada, on the West Ship Harbour Road off of Trunk 7 84 kilometers (52 mi) east of Dartmouth. The community is host to the Clam Harbour Beach sandcastle contest every year in August.

== Parks ==
- Clam Harbour Beach Provincial Park

== Communications ==
- Telephone exchange 902 - 845
- Postal code - B0J 1Y0
