= Chebucto Peninsula =

Chebucto Peninsula Chebucto Peninsula
- Peninsula
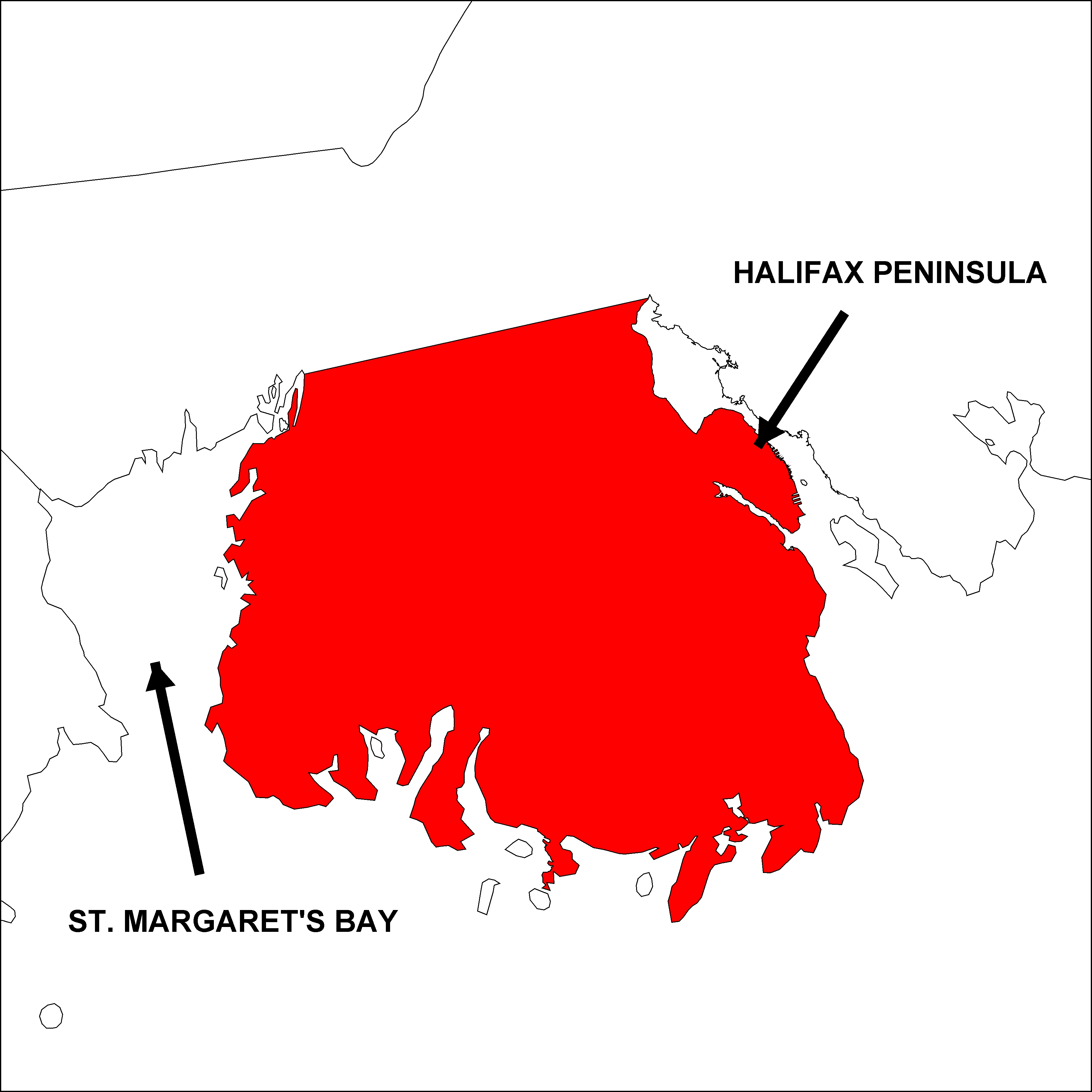
- Location of Chebucto Peninsula in municipal Halifax

- Location of Chebucto Peninsula in Nova Scotia
- Coordinates: 44°35′N 63°45′W
- Country: Canada
- Province: Nova Scotia
- Municipality: Halifax Regional Municipality
- Founded: 21 June 1749
- Neighborhoods: Bedford, Beechville, Halifax Peninsula, Mainland Halifax, Peggy's Cove, Sambro, Stillwater Lake, Tantallon

Government
  - Type: Regional Municipality
- Time zone: UTC−4 (AST)
  - Summer (DST): UTC−3 (ADT)
- Postal code span: B
- Area codes: 902, 782
- Part of a series about Places in Nova Scotia

The Chebucto Peninsula is a peninsula located in central Nova Scotia, Canada, entirely within the Halifax Regional Municipality on the Atlantic coast.

It is bordered by St. Margarets Bay in the west, the open Atlantic Ocean to the south, and Halifax Harbour (including Bedford Basin) to the east. The peninsula also includes a sub-peninsula - the Halifax Peninsula.

The majority of the central part of the Chebucto Peninsula is uninhabited and designated a protected wilderness area to prevent encroaching urban sprawl development.
