= Gold Lake (Nova Scotia) =

Lake in Halifax County, Nova Scotia

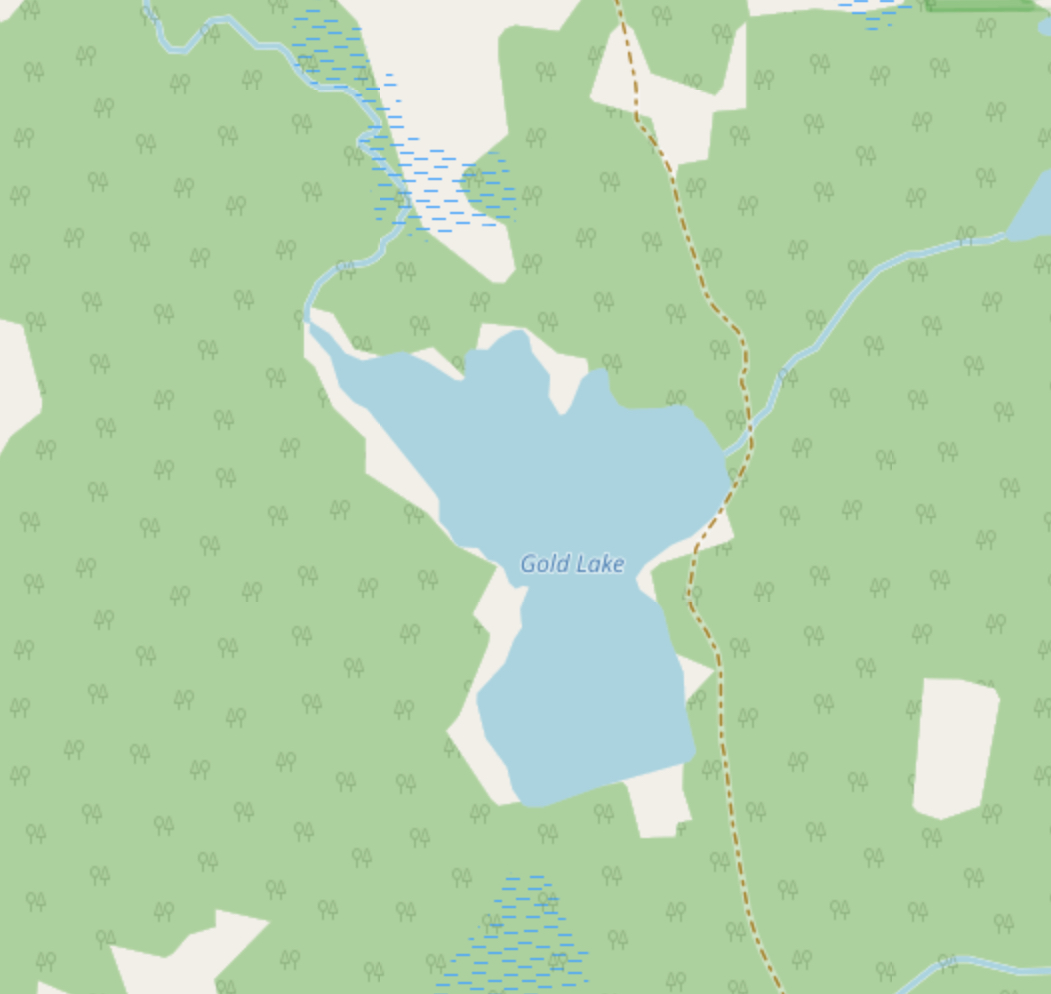
- Interactive map of Gold Lake
- Location: Halifax County
- Coordinates: 44°55′07″N 62°56′51″W
- Basin countries: Canada
- Max. length: 781.52 metres (2,564.0 ft)
- Max. width: 376.25 metres (1,234.4 ft)
- Frozen: Late December or January to April

Gold Lake is a glacial lake in Halifax County, Nova Scotia, Canada. It is connected to Big Ass Lake by an unnamed stream. The lake includes a stillwater area known as Gold Lake Stillwater and an associated brook called Gold Lake Brook. The lake is 59.15 kilometres (36.75 mi) from Halifax, and 56.09 kilometres (34.85 mi) from Truro. The lake was named on December 12, 1939.

== Geography ==
The lake is measured approximately 781.52 metres (2,564.0 ft) in length and 376.25 metres (1,234.4 ft) in width. Near lakes around Gold Lake includes Little Mud Lake, Grassy Lake, Dreadnought Lake, North Twin Lake, and South Twin Lake. It is mostly surrounded by wooded forests and wetlands.

=== Region ===
Gold lake is in the Mooseland region, Eastern Shore. More specifically, it is in the EL6489 region, a.k.a. Gold Lake region, which includes the entirety of Gold Lake, a half of Big Ass Lake, and a quarter of Little Mud Lake.

== Routes ==
Gold Lake can be accessed via Nova Scotia Route 224, which runs from Shubenacadie to Sheet Harbour. From Elmsvale, the lake can be reached by following Mooseland Road toward the Moose River Gold Mines. The lake can also be accessed by Nova Scotia Route 7.

== Mine ==
=== Moose River Gold Mines ===
The lake is 7 kilometres (4.3 mi) from Moose River Gold Mines, the site of an 1860s gold rush and a widely reported 1936 Moose River Mine Disaster cave-in that trapped three men underground for 11 days. 38.6 troy ounces of gold was extracted from Gold Lake.

== See also ==
- List of lakes of Nova Scotia
- Ship Harbour Long Lake Wilderness Area
- Lake Charlotte
- Scraggy Lake
