= Eastern Shore Granite Ridge =

Mountain ridge in Nova Scotia, Canada

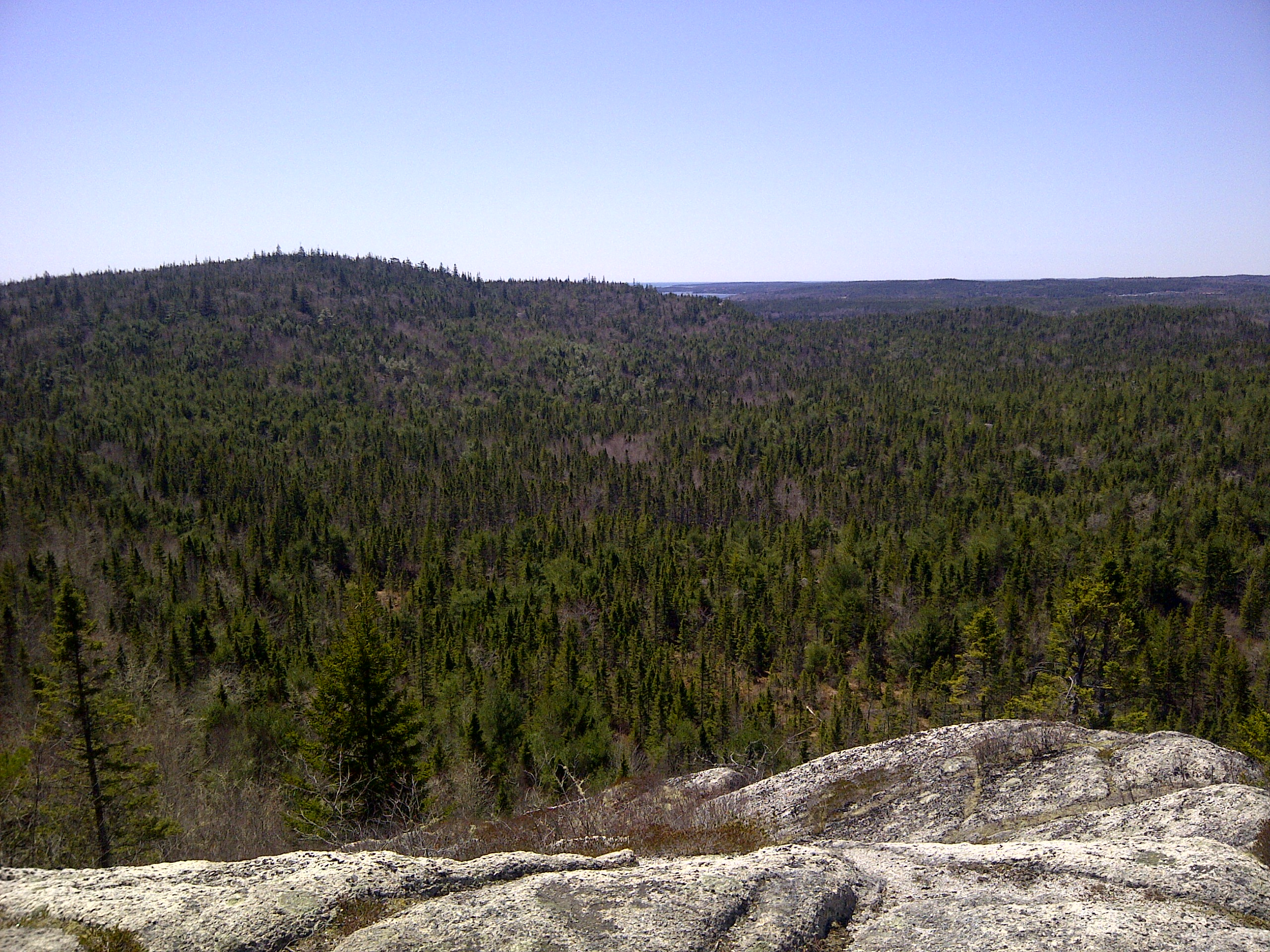
- Typical softwood-forested hills and valleys of the Eastern Shore Granite Ridge.

Highest point
- Peak: Unnamed
- Elevation: 188 m (617 ft)
- Coordinates: 44°48′24″N 63°31′50″W

Dimensions
- Length: 70 km (43 mi) East-West
- Width: 7–15 km (4.3–9.3 mi)

Geography
- Country: Canada
- Region: Nova Scotia
- Range coordinates: 44°50′N 63°10′W
- Parent range: Appalachian Mountains

The Eastern Shore Granite Ridge, also known as the Musquodoboit Batholith, is a range of prominent hills averaging 100-125m (330-410 ft) in height, located just inland from the Eastern Shore of Nova Scotia. Geologically, it is related to the much larger South Mountain Batholith, but the two are geologically distinct areas. Many of the hills have steep cliffs on one or more of their sides, some featuring vertical drops in excess of 50 m (160 ft); as a result, many of the taller hills offer extensive views despite their relatively low elevation.

The highest point of the range is located approximately eight km north-northwest of North Preston near the western side of the ridge, and is an unnamed peak. This hill is 188 m (617 ft) tall and is one of the highest points for nearly 15 km. Other noteworthy summits are Target Hill located 1.4 km east, measuring 186 m (607 ft) in height and Farquhar's Mountain, located about 6.5 km north-northwest of Gaetz Brook, measuring 155 m (508 ft) in height.

== Geography ==
In the Natural History Map of Nova Scotia, the Eastern Shore Granite Ridge (known there simply as "Granite Ridge") is given area code 453. It's described as being a narrow plateau at around 100 m (350 ft) in elevation, with steep margins and littered with boulders of varying sizes. A thin layer of glacial till provides poor soil, with large areas of exposed bedrock. Most of the trees are conifers, such as red spruce, balsam fir, Eastern hemlock, and Eastern white pine, with occasional patches of red oak and white birch in burned areas. The low-lying areas of the Granite Ridge tend to be feature lakes, the largest of which is Tangier Grand Lake.

The ridge runs in a roughly west-to-east direction, with its western end near Waverley, and its eastern extremity near Sheet Harbour. Its total length is roughly 70 km, and varies in width from 20 km along the lower Musquodoboit Valley to 7 km behind Jeddore Harbour. Its presence is the reason why Ship Harbour and Jeddore Harbour do not extend farther inland than they do.

The ridge contains three major faults, which run from a NW to SE direction. Porters Lake and Lake Charlotte occupy the westernmost and easternmost faults respectively, while the Musquodoboit River occupies the central one.

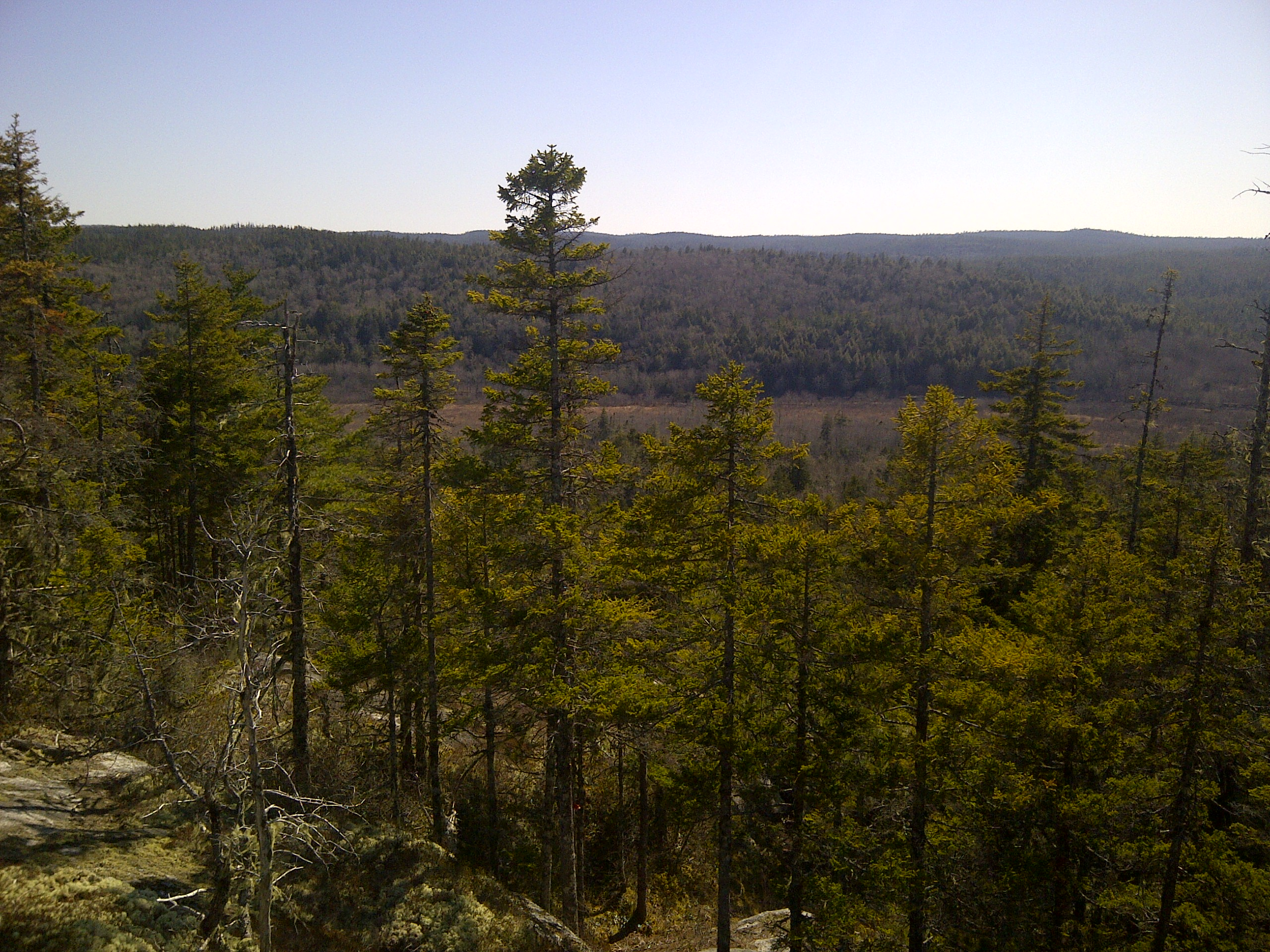
Looking westward from the Big Sky lookoff, North Granite Ridge Trail

=== Geology ===
The Eastern Shore Granite Ridge is composed primarily of the Muqquodiboit Batholith which formed in the Late Devonian. Rock types include coarse and fine-grained leucomonzogranties and biotite monzogranite, and represents the second-largest granite batholith in the province, after the South Mountain batholith. Other granite batholiths that were formed at the same time as the Eastern Shore Granite ridge include the Canso Barrens and the Shelburne Batholith, and a number of smaller batholiths scattered around the south-central half of the province.

== Transportation ==
Due to the ridge's rugged terrain, very few major roads cross it, with the exception of the Mooseland Road just west of Sheet Harbour, and Highway 357, which travels through the more level terrain of the Musquodoboit Valley. Myra Road near Porters Lake penetrates into the ridge, but comes to a dead end at the north end of Porters Lake.

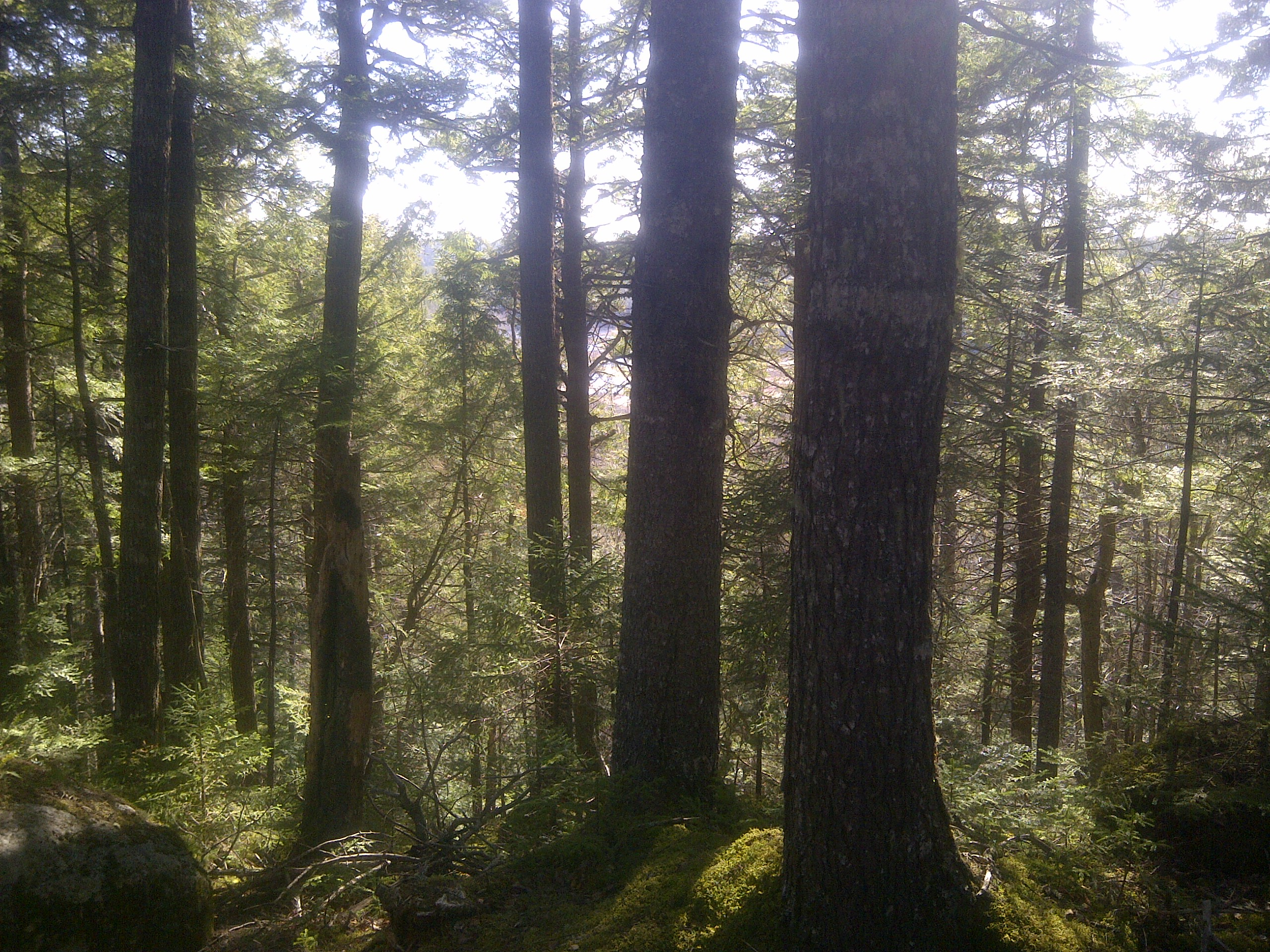
Large hemlock trees growing on the Eastern Shore Granite Ridge

In the 1920s, the Intercolonial built a railway going from Dartmouth to Upper Musquodoboit. Due to the presence of the Ridge, the only way to get to Upper Musquodoboit from the coast was to follow the Musquodoboit Valley, as building the railway through the hills would have required a large amount of blasting and infilling. This railway ran (under CN ownership) until the 1980s, when it was abandoned. The section of railbed through the Ridge, from Gibraltar to Musquodoboit Harbour, was converted to a multiuse (pedestrian, skiing, and cycling) trail in 1998 by the Musuqodoboit Trailways Association. The trailway is part of the Nova Scotia section of the Trans Canada Trail.

Beyond the roads and trailway, transportation is limited to a network of old logging roads, which are often poorly maintained and only driveable using mountain bikes or high-clearance vehicles such as Jeeps and pickups. A more traditional method of transportation is by canoe or other small craft, using the many portages which connect many of the region's lakes. Most of the region's portage trails are not officially managed, however, a route running from Oyster Pond to Lays Lake Road has been designated as a water trail known as the Skull Lake Loop, and is maintained by Canoe Kayak Nova Scotia.

== Economic activity ==
Because of the region's rough topography, it is extremely difficult to clearcut using heavy machinery. As a result, most of the area has not been clearcut, and remains owned by the Province of Nova Scotia. A mine located north of Musquodoboit Harbour managed to extract silver, lead, and zinc ores, but has been shut down for a long time.

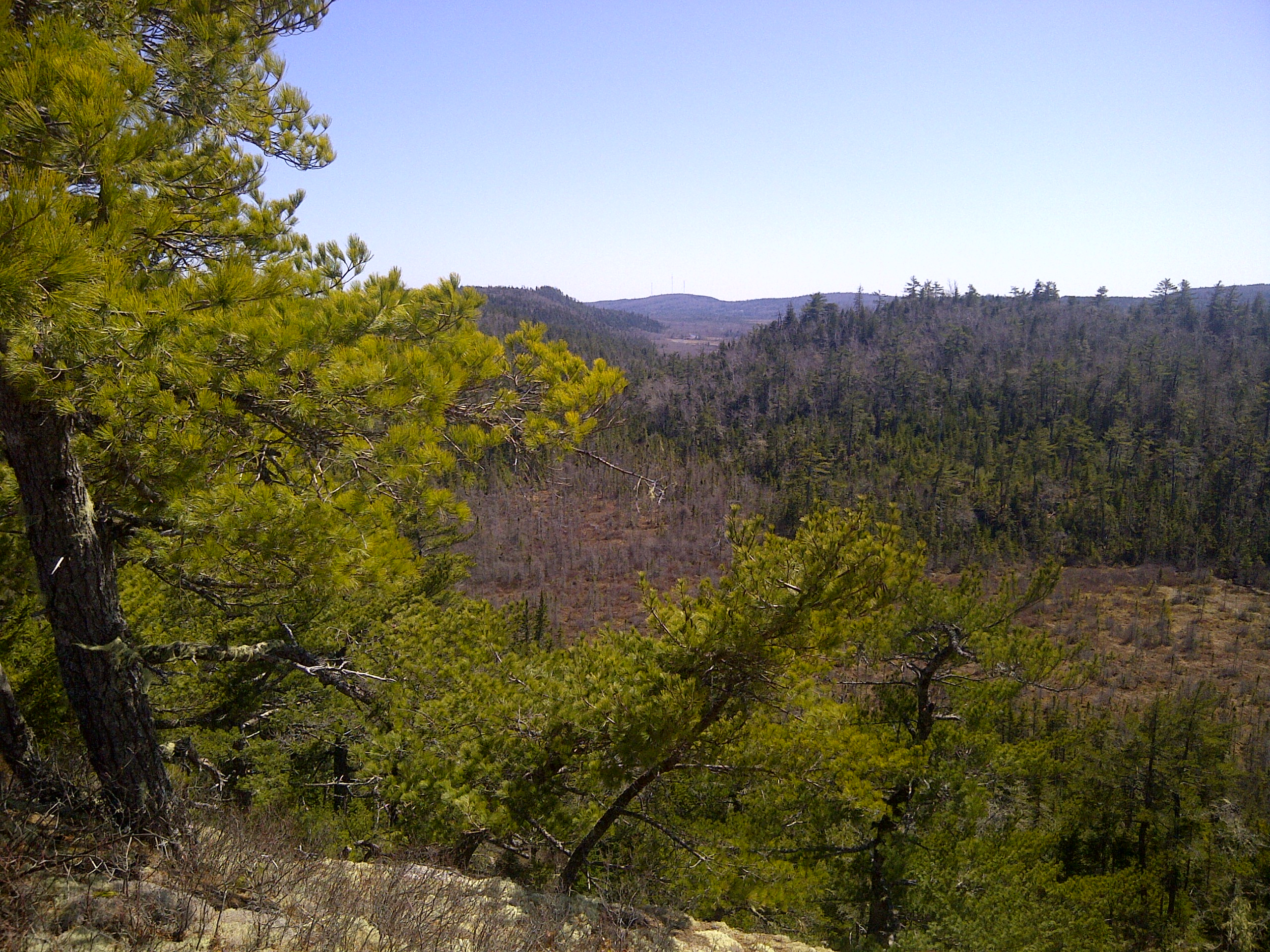
Looking southward from the Big Sky lookoff on the North Granite Ridge Trail

Because of the region's lack of development and multiple wilderness areas, it is popular with hikers and canoers. Trails that cross this ridge include the Admiral Lake Loop and Granite Ridge Trails that branch off the Musquodoboit Trailway, and the Crowbar Lake Trails originating just west of Porter's Lake.

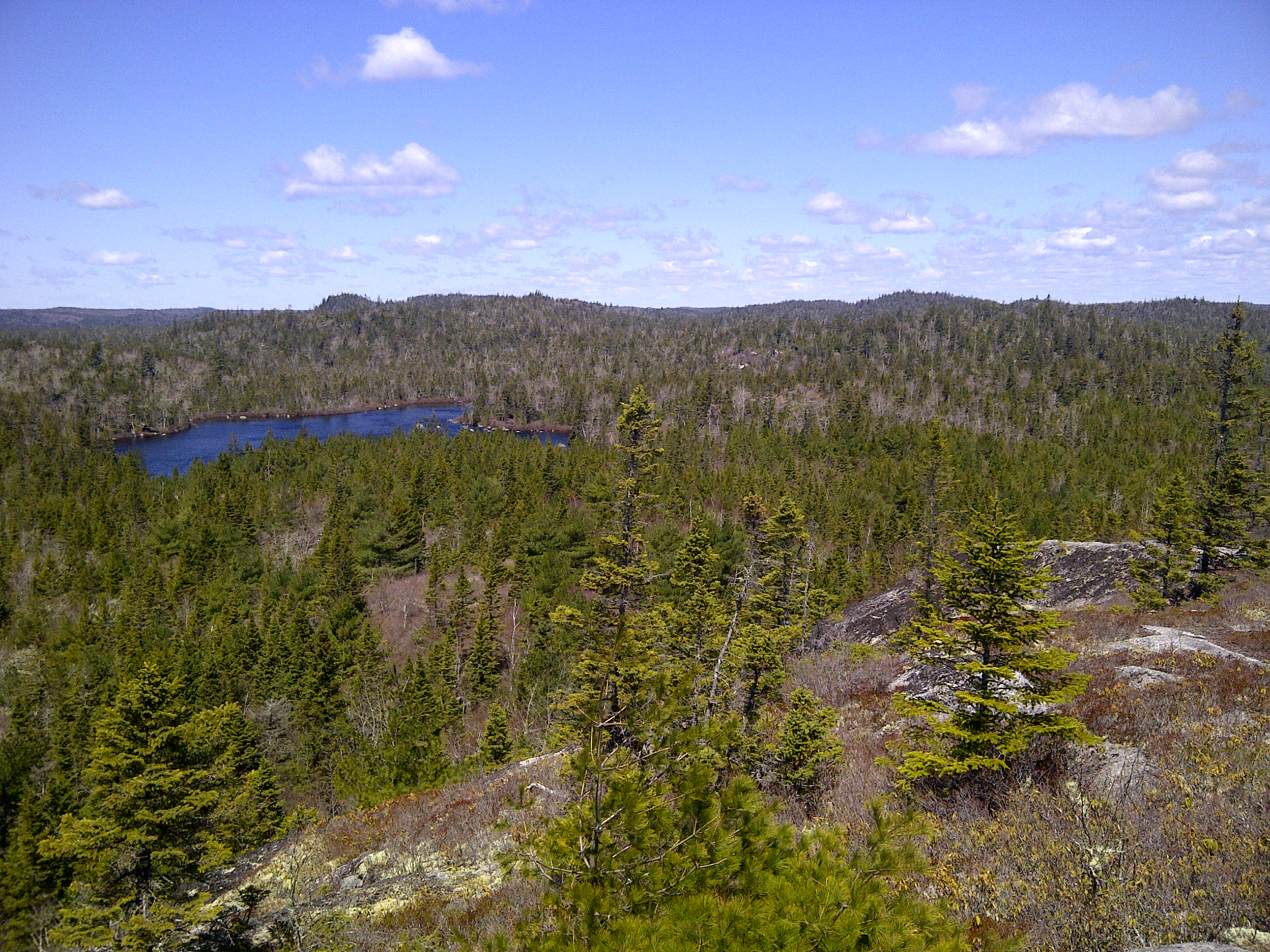
A view of the hills and lakes of the Eastern Shore granite ridge

=== Parks and protected areas ===
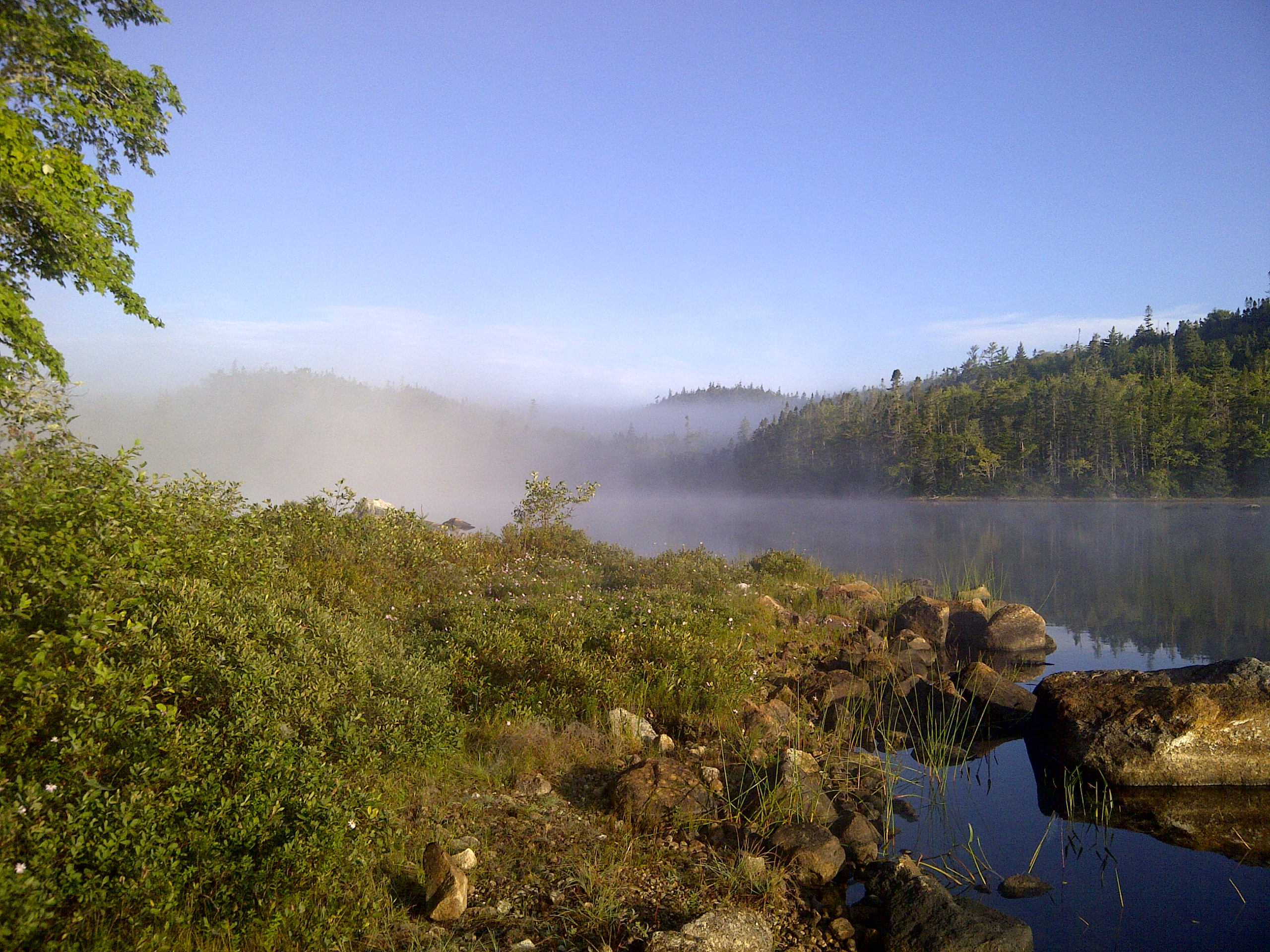
Moose Cove Lake, one of the many lakes in the Granite Ridge.

Much of the Eastern Shore Granite Ridge today has been designated as protected land by the Province of Nova Scotia, in large part due to the rugged terrain making clearcutting economically unfeasible. The major protected areas of the Granite Ridge, from west to east, are Waverley-Salmon River Long Lake Wilderness Area (89.1 km^{2}), White Lake Wilderness Area (51.1 km^{2}), Ship Harbour Long Lake Wilderness Area (165.8 km^{2}), and Tangier Grand Lake Wilderness Area (161.7 km^{2}). Additionally, a small amount of land (4 km^{2}) between Paces Lake and Long Bridge Lake is to be designated as protected. Combined, these protected areas comprise an area larger than Kejimkujik National Park, with three times as many lakes. However, unlike the national park, none of the campsites are officially maintained, and the condition of the portage trails is variable.
