= Scraggy Lake =

Lake in Nova Scotia, Canada

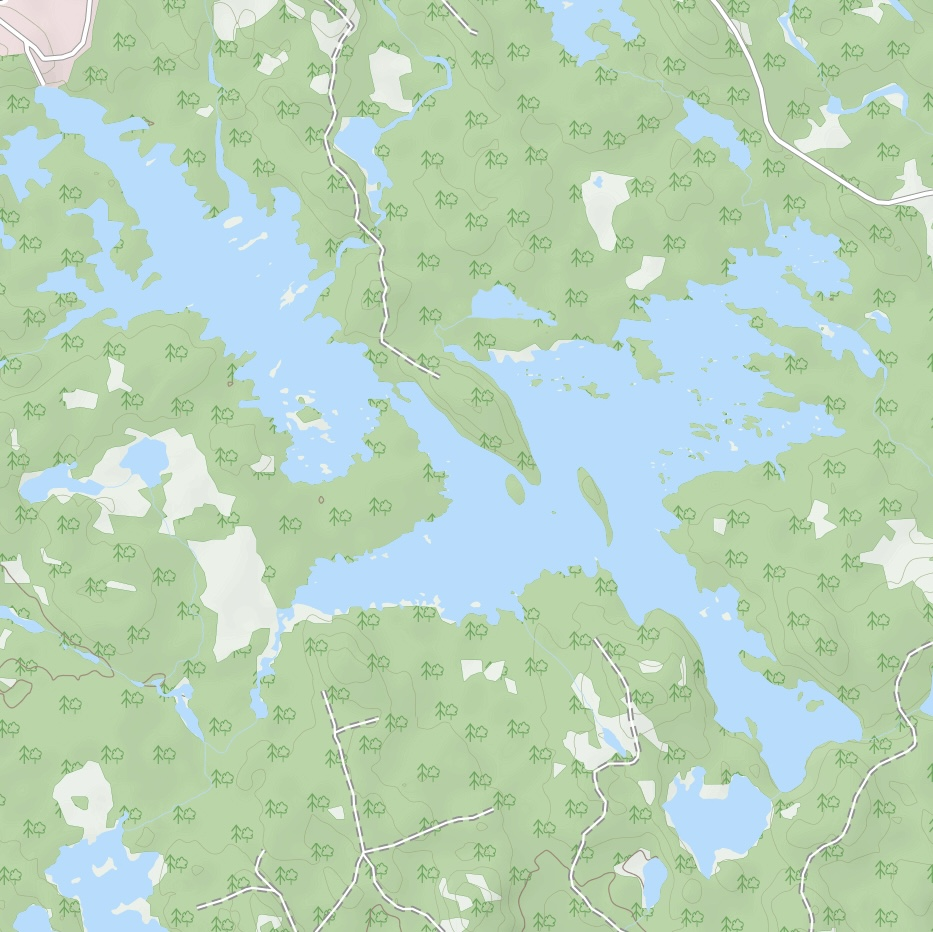
- Interactive map of Scraggy Lake
- Location: Halifax County, Nova Scotia, Canada
- Coordinates: 44°57′2″N 62°53′11″W
- Basin countries: Canada
- Surface area: 721.6 hectares (2.786 sq mi)

Scraggy Lake (IPA: /ˈskræɡi leɪk/) is a lake located in Halifax County, Nova Scotia, Canada. It is 65.36 kilometres (40.61 mi) from Halifax and 57.17 kilometres (35.52 mi) from Truro. The Indians called it Misegumisk, meaning "scraggy and rough".

== Geography ==
=== Geography ===
The lake has an area of approximately 721.6 hectares (2.786 sq mi). Lakes near Scraggy Lake include Melvin Lake, Davis Lake, Mud Lake, and Lose Lake.

Scraggy Lake has nine inlets, as well as an outlet and a dam located at its southwest corner. The lake includes three named coves: Big Cove, Portobello Cove, and Loon Pond Cove. It also contains numerous islands, although none of them are officially named.

=== Features ===
The lake is within Ship Harbour Long Lake Wilderness Area, which contains glacially formed drumlin hills. The northwest corner of the lake adjoins the Moose River gold mining area. Near Scraggy Lake, there are extensive wetlands.

== Wildlife ==
Scraggy Lake has abundant populations of trouts, ducks, bears and various game birds, making it a significant area for both hunting and fishing activities.

== See also ==
- List of lakes of Nova Scotia
- Big Ass Lake
- Tangier Grand Lake
