= Moose Cove Lake =

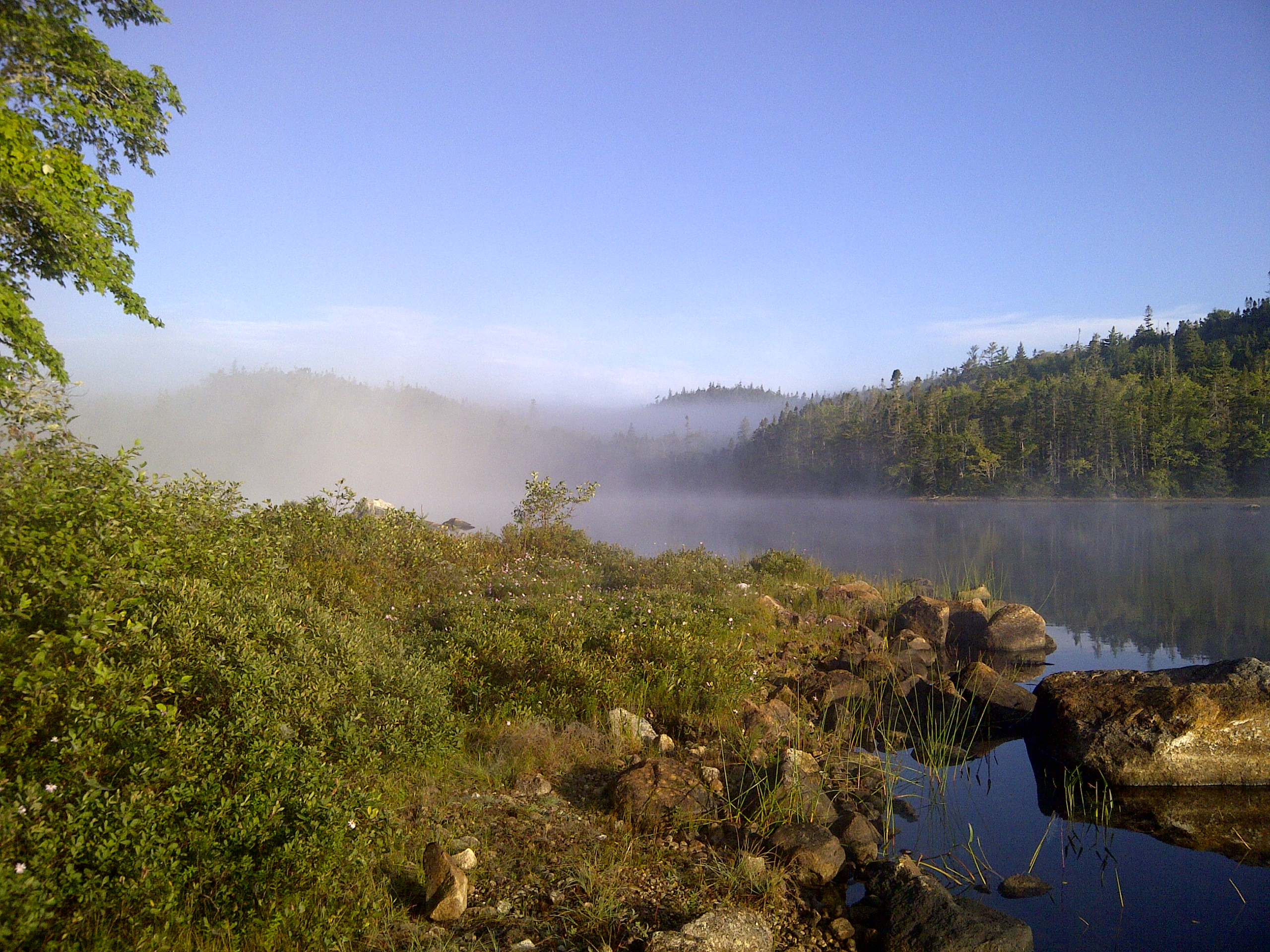
- Early morning fog rises from a small island in Moose Cove Lake.

- Location within Nova Scotia
- Location: Halifax County, Nova Scotia
- Coordinates: 44.810°N 63.050°W
- Type: Lake
- Basin countries: Canada
- Max. length: 3 km (1.9 mi)
- Max. width: 1.8 km (1.1 mi)
- Islands: 8

Moose Cove Lake is a lake located in Halifax County, Nova Scotia, approximately 3.3 kilometres (2.1 mi) due north of Salmon River Bridge. The lake is located within the Ship Harbour Long Lake Wilderness Area.

== Description ==
Moose Cove Lake has a very irregular shape. The lake can be divided into roughly two halves, which are interconnected by two shallow and narrow passageways.

=== Western half ===
The western basin is approximately 1.8 kilometres (1.1 mi) long and 0.8 kilometres (0.50 mi) wide, and oriented in a north-south direction. Seven of the lake's eight islands are located here, with the largest one being 380 metres (1,250 ft) long and 250 metres (820 ft) wide, in the shape of an arrow pointing southeast. Much of the lake is shallow and littered with granite boulders, remnants of the ice age. A small brook on the south end of this lake leads to Moose Cove on Salmon River Inlet, from which the lake gets its name.

=== Eastern half ===
The eastern part of the lake is around 2.3 km (1.4 mi) long, with a maximum width of about 0.5 km (0.31 mi), oriented in a west-northwest to east-southeast direction. It is also fairly shallow, with occasional boulders poking above the surface of the water. There is one triangular island, about 100 by 70 m (330 by 230 ft), located near the middle of the lake. This half connects to Oak Lake via a small and very short brook on its south side.

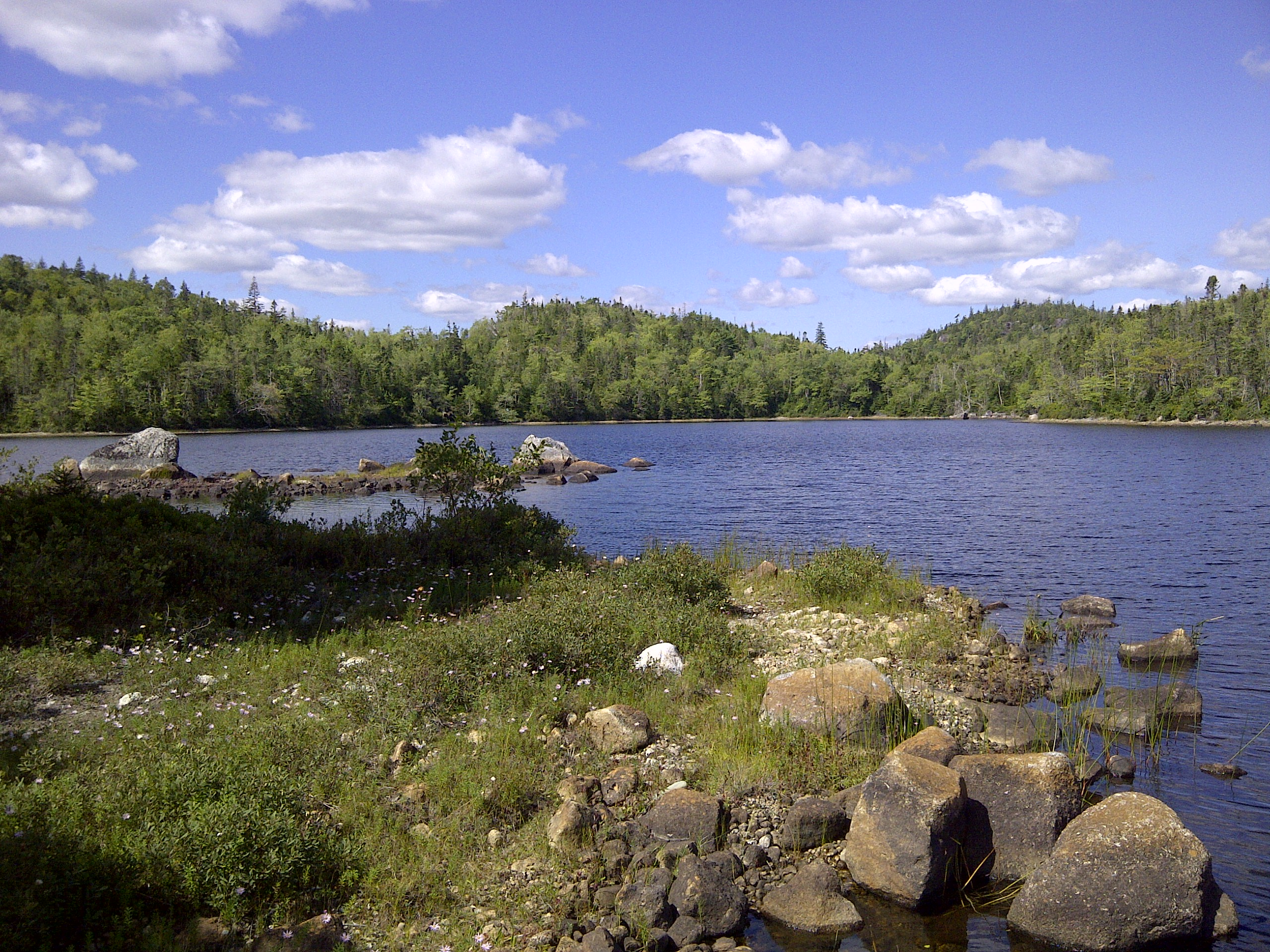
The northernmost island in Moose Cove Lake

== Recreation ==
This lake is part of the Skull Lake Loop, a water trail organized by Canoe Kayak Nova Scotia. As there is no settlement in the area, the main recreational activity is paddling on the lake. As it is a wilderness area, deer hunting and fishing are also possible, in season. A number of campsites can be found on Moose Cove Lake, along with the many lakes that surround it.

=== Access ===
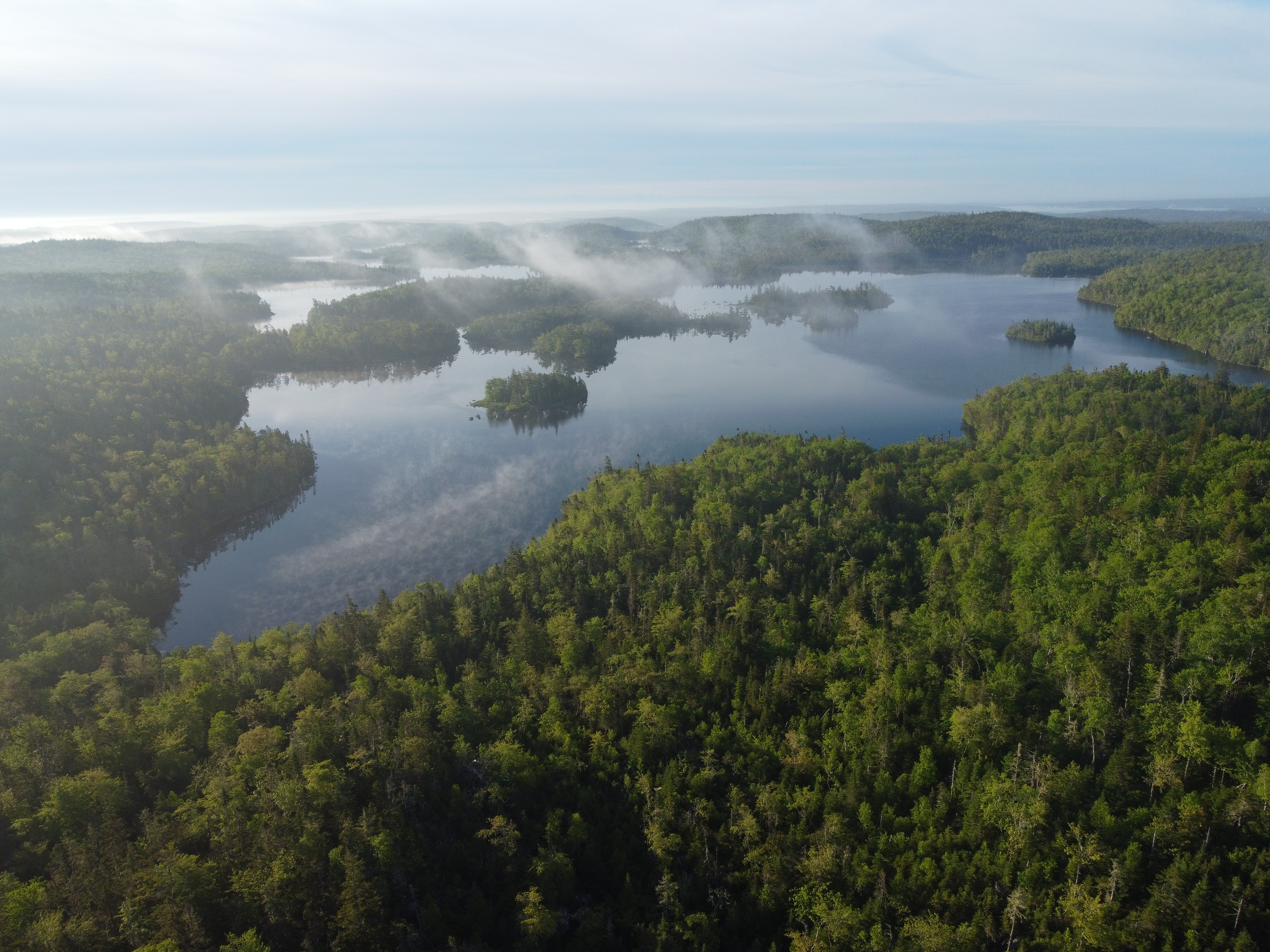
Aerial photograph of the western half of Moose Cove Lake at sunrise

There are no roads that connect directly to Moose Cove Lake. The most common way to access this lake is from the south via Oak Lake, which connects via a 390 m (1,280 ft) portage to Oyster Pond, where there is an easily accessible boat launch. Another option is to drive down Lays Lake Road, and launch a boat at Rocky Lake. From here, getting to Moose Cove Lake requires three 50 m (160 ft) portages to get to Richardson Lake to the northwest, followed by a 700 m (2,300 ft) portage to enter Moose Cove Lake itself.
