= Waverley–Salmon River Long Lake Wilderness Area =

Wilderness area in Nova Scotia, Canada

Waverley - Salmon River Long Lake Wilderness Area
- IUCN category Ib (wilderness area)
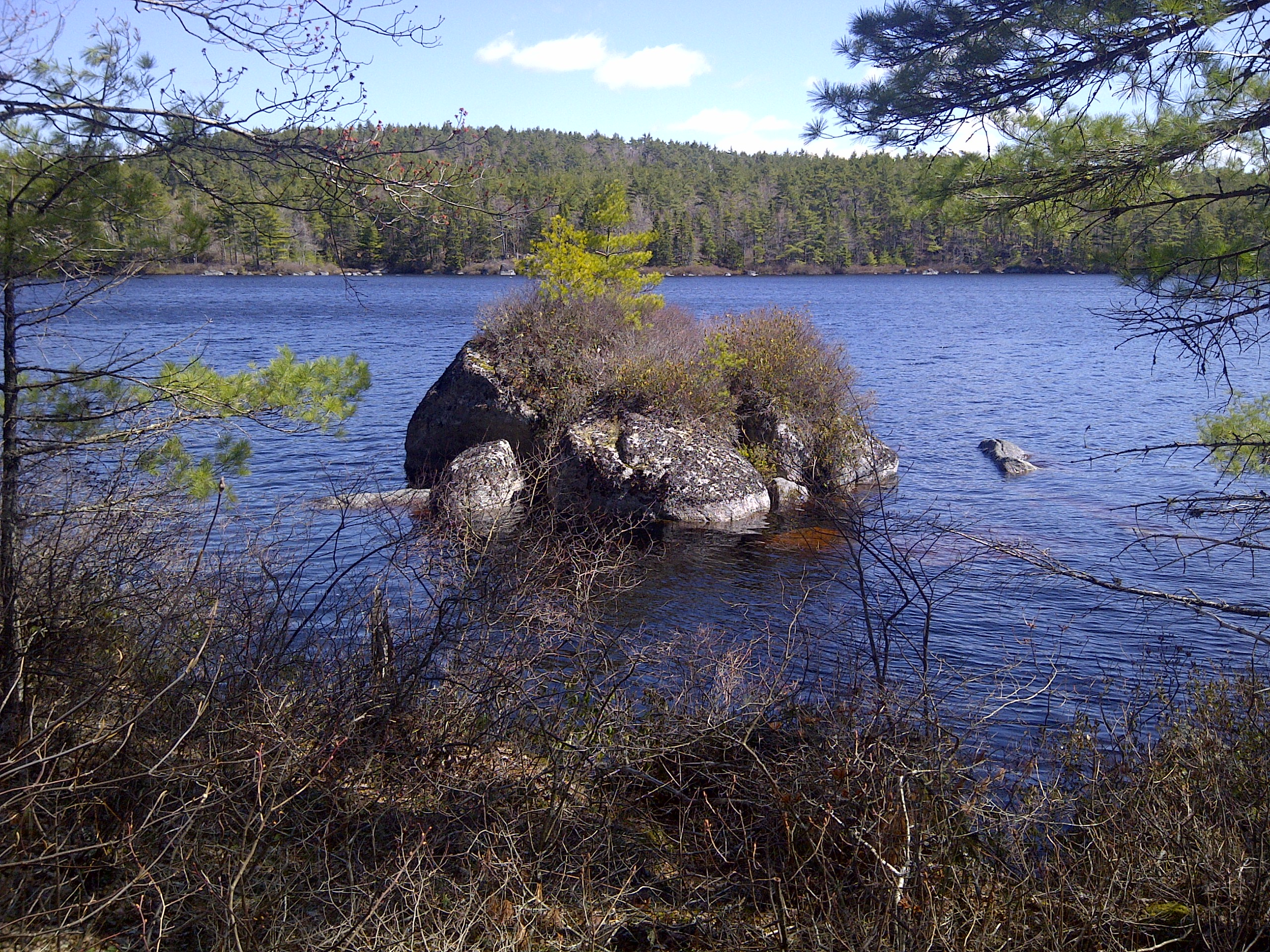
- A small island located in West Lake, one of the many lakes within the wilderness area
- Interactive map of Waverley - Salmon River Long Lake Wilderness Area
- Location: Nova Scotia, Canada
- Nearest city: Porters Lake, Nova Scotia, Halifax, Nova Scotia
- Coordinates: 44°46′32″N 63°23′54″W
- Area: 8,710 ha (87.1 km^{2})
- Governing body: Nova Scotia Department of Natural Resources

The Waverley - Salmon River Long Lake Wilderness Area is a provincial wilderness area located about 20 kilometers east of Dartmouth Nova Scotia, Canada.

== Geographical description ==
The wilderness area represents the Eastern Shore Granite Ridge, one of Nova Scotia's many natural areas. It features a rugged wilderness of lakes, rivers, and barren granite hills in the south. In the north, the bedrock is quartzite and slate, and the terrain is much less hilly.

Some of the hills found in the wilderness area reach over 100 meters tall, and jack pine (an uncommon tree in Nova Scotia) grows in abundance on the hills. The wilderness area features pockets of old-growth red pine, white pine, and hemlock. Due to the hilly nature of the terrain, much of the old-growth softwood forest is well-drained. The valleys of the wilderness area, which are much wetter, feature black spruce and balsam fir, and the occasional red maple or white birch grows amongst the softwoods. Part of the watershed that feeds Lake Major, the main water supply for the City of Dartmouth is contained within this wilderness area. The southern part of the wilderness area, including West Lake and Granite Lake and the Salmon River can be accessed via the Crowbar Lake Hiking Trail. Most of the remainder of the wilderness area may be accessed by canoeing and portaging, with starting points on Lake Major, Aerotech Drive, or Salmon River Road.

In 2011, the Wilderness Area was enlarged, with all the land around Three Bridges Brook becoming protected.

Nearby wilderness areas featuring similar topography, flora, and fauna include the White Lake Wilderness Area, Ship Harbour Long Lake Wilderness Area, and Tangier Grand Lake Wilderness Area.

== History ==
This wilderness area was originally established as the Waverley Game Sanctuary by the Province of Nova Scotia in 1929, in an attempt to protect game species from overhunting and overtrapping. It was the third-oldest game sanctuary, after the Tobeatic Wilderness Area (1927) and Liscomb Game Sanctuary (1928). In order to enforce the rules, three warden's cabins were established around the edges of the game sanctuary. These were located at the north ends of Lake Major and Three Mile Lake, along with an island within Miller Lake.

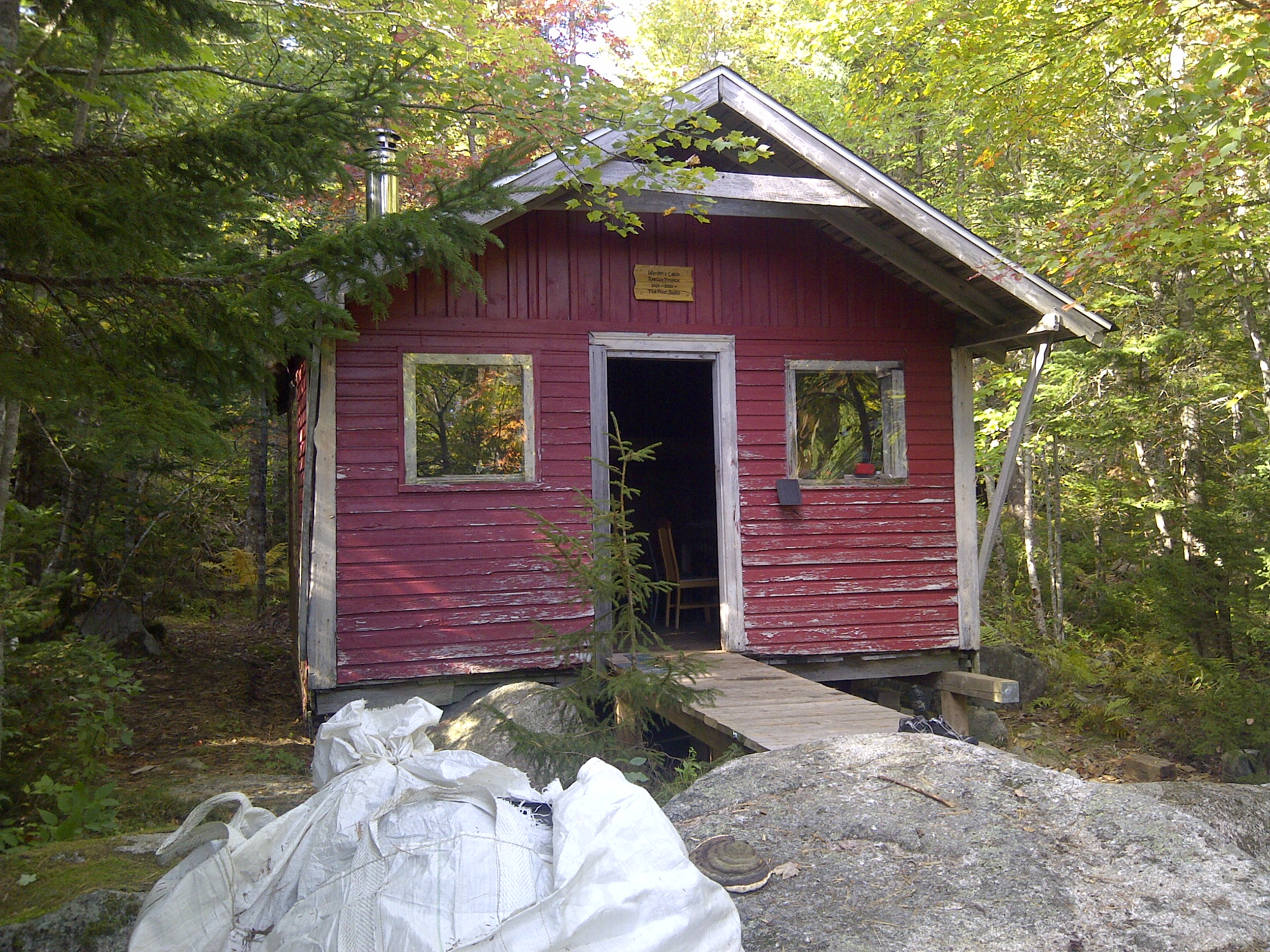
The warden's cabin on the north end of Three Mile Lake.

When the game sanctuary was re-designated as a wilderness area in 1991, hunting was once more allowed, and the warden's cabins fell out of use. Today, the Miller Lake cabin is used by Scouts Canada, while the Three Mile Lake cabin is left open for visitors. The Lake Major cabin has been burned.
