= Big Ass Lake =

Lake in Nova Scotia, Canada

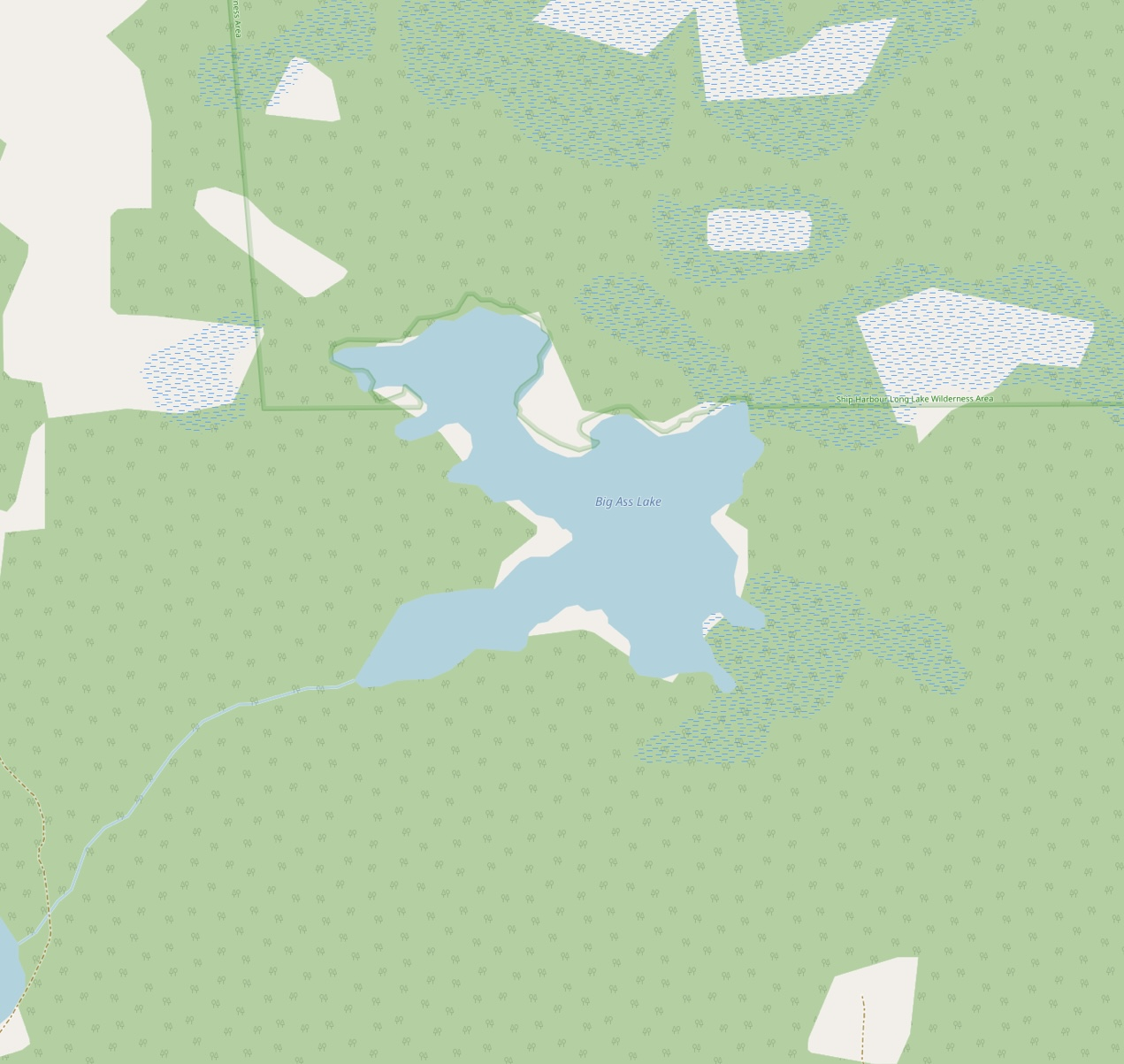

- Location in Nova Scotia
- Location: Nova Scotia, Canada
- Coordinates: 44°55′32″N 62°55′58″W
- Type: Glacial lake
- Max. length: 750 metres (2,460 ft)
- Max. width: 555 metres (1,821 ft)
- Surface area: Approx 150,000 m^{2} (0.15 km^{2})
- Islands: 0
- Settlements: None

Big Ass Lake is a glacial lake in Halifax County, Nova Scotia, Canada. It is located 60 km (37 miles) to the northeast of Halifax, the capital city of Nova Scotia and 253 km (157 miles) from Sydney, Nova Scotia. The lake was formally named on March 5, 1953.

== Geography ==
The lake measures 555 metres (1,821 ft) across at its widest point, while its longest diagonal length measures approximately 750 m (2,460 ft). Surface area is approximately 150,000 square metres (0.15 km^{2}). Depth measures about 3 to 8 metres (9.8 to 26.2 ft). The lake has no islands.

It is connected to Gold Lake by an unnamed creek. Lakes nearby include Dreadnought Lake, Little Mud Lake, North Twin Lake and South Twin Lake.

The lake has two arms: one located at the southeastern corner and another oriented toward the east-southeast.

=== Region ===
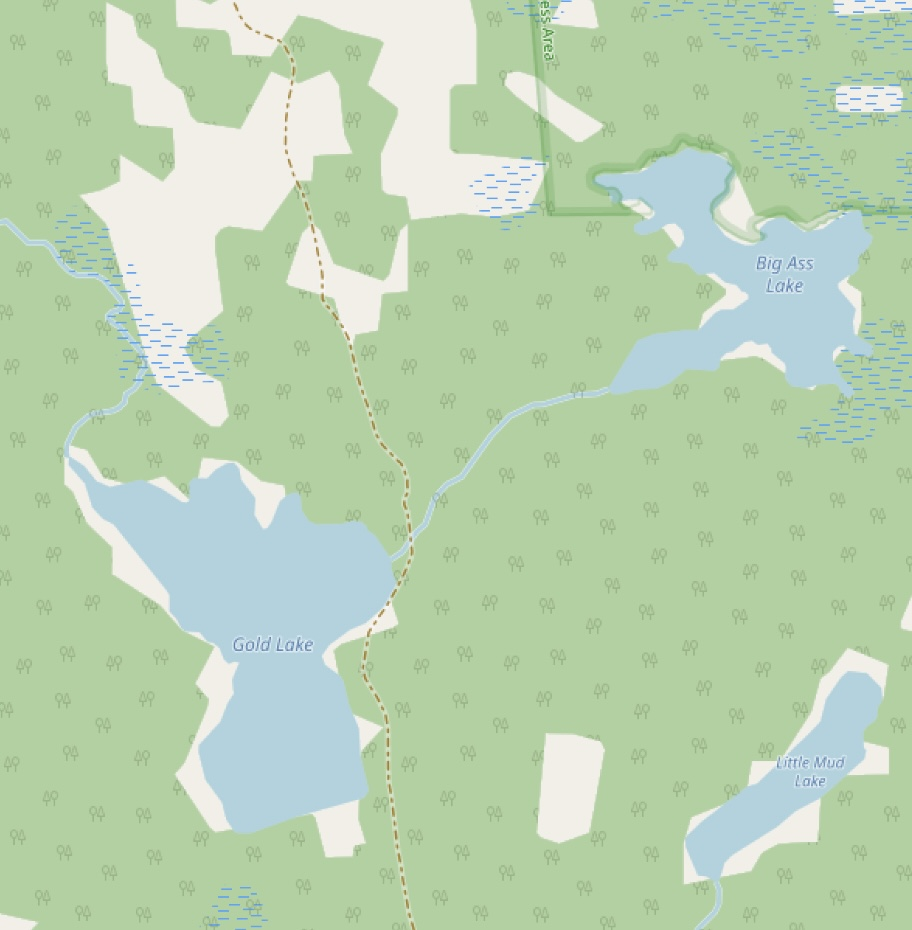
EL6489 region

Big Ass Lake is in Canada, Nova Scotia, Halifax County. It is in the Eastern shore, Mooseland region. More precisely, it is in the EL6489 region a.k.a. the Gold Lake region. The EL6489 region includes all of Gold Lake, a majority of Big Ass Lake, and a partition of Little Mud Lake.

=== Features ===
Big Ass Lake borders Ship Harbour Long Lake Wilderness Area, which protects 16,500 hectares (41,000 acres) of rugged woodlands. A nearby hill, Reid Hill, is situated close to the lake.

== Access ==
Big Ass Lake is accessible via Nova Scotia Route 224, which runs from Shubenacadie to Sheet Harbour. From Elmsvale, the lake can be reached by following Mooseland Road toward the Moose River Gold Mines. Big Ass Lake is also accessible via Nova Scotia Highway 7.

== See also ==
- List of lakes of Nova Scotia
- Place names considered unusual
- KML file for Big Ass Lake
