= Ship Harbour Long Lake Wilderness Area =

Wilderness area in Nova Scotia

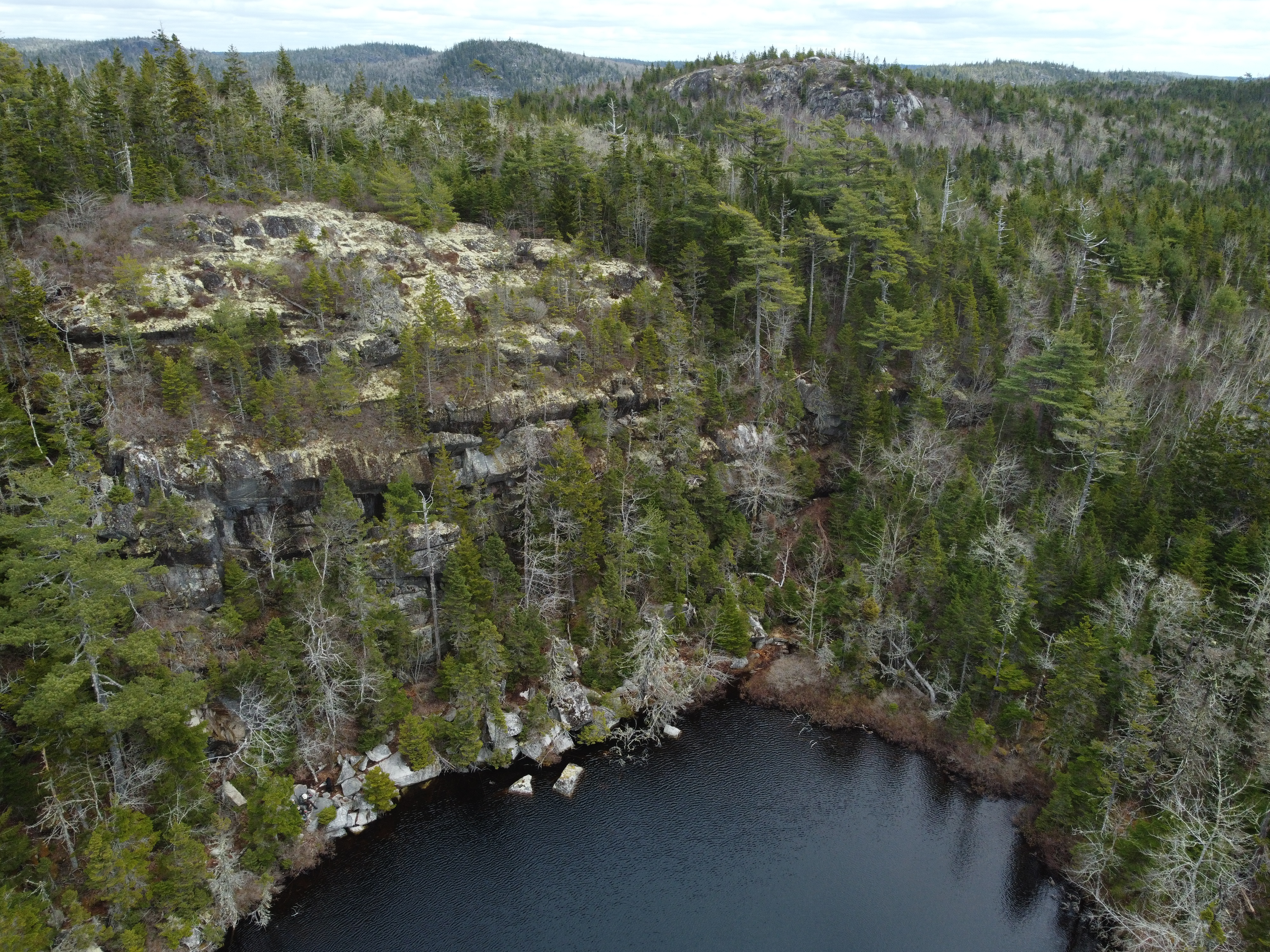
- Cliff side of Eunice Lake
- Interactive map of Ship Harbour Long Lake Wilderness Area
- Location: Mooseland, Halifax County
- Nearest city: Musquodoboit Harbour
- Coordinates: 44°54′19″N 63°2′30″W
- Area: 16,581 hectares (40,970 acres)
- Established: May 2006
- Governing body: Environment and Climate Change of Nova Scotia

Ship Harbour Long Lake Wilderness Area is a protected wilderness area in Halifax County, Nova Scotia, Canada, adjacent to Moose River Gold Mines by approximately 910 metres (0.57 mi) and Musquodoboit Harbour. The wilderness area was established in 2006, and is administered by Environment and Climate Change of Nova Scotia.

The wilderness area is the largest protected area in Halifax County, with a size of 16,581 hectares (40,970 acres). It is near to two wilderness areas, one being the White Lake Wilderness Area, and the other being the Tangier Grand Lake Wilderness Area. The wilderness area contains a varied landscape of granite and quartzite bedrock, numerous lakes, wetlands, and forested hills formed by glacial processes.

The designation of the wilderness area received generally supportive feedback, leading to its establishment in 2009. One of the reasons for the positive votes was its ecological values. The landscape supports rare lichens, fish, trees, and other wildlife. The trees include white pine, red spruce, balsam fir, red maple, white birch and other hardwoods. It also was voted for its recreational values, such as hiking, canoeing, angling, and hunting.

== Geography ==
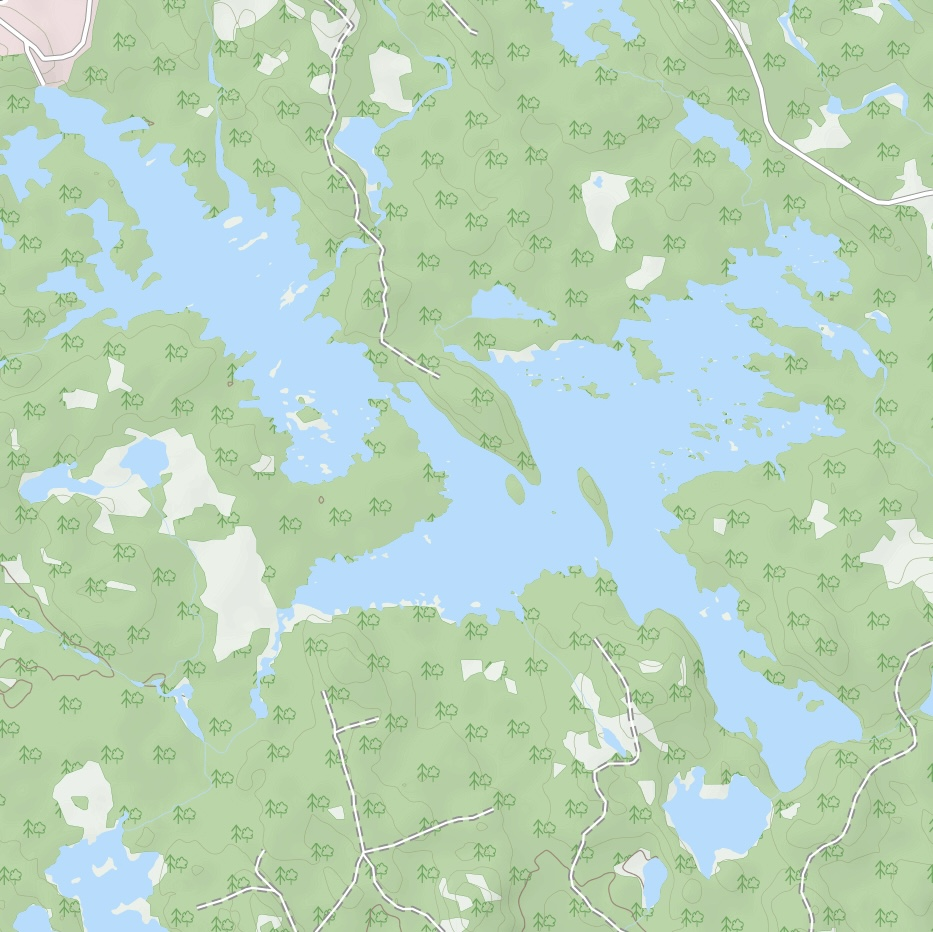
Map of Scraggy Lake

Ship Harbour Long Lake Wilderness Area comprises approximately 16,581 hectares (40,970 acres). It is the largest protected area in Halifax County. At Scraggy Lake, the wilderness area extends into a landscape with elongated hills and drumlins, made from glaciers. Two large wilderness areas are adjacent to the area: White Lake Wilderness Area, and Tangier Grand Lake Wilderness Area.

=== Geology ===
The southern portions of Ship Harbour Long Lake Wilderness Area are underlain by approximately 350-million-year-old granitic bedrock, which creates a rugged, ridged landscape dotted with numerous lakes and rocky outcrops. It is also underlain Neoproterozoic to Early Ordovician rocks of the Meguma Supergroup, with granite rock intrusions of the Devonian Musquodoboit Batholith.

The granite is typically covered by a thin layer of stony glacial till and nutrient-poor, acidic soils. In contrast, other parts of the wilderness area are underlain by quartzite bedrock dating back roughly 500 million years, making the landscape flat.

Minerals in the wilderness area include gold, tungsten, molybdenum, copper, zinc, aggregate, and peat. Lake Charlotte and Gold Lake gold districts are known for having similar geological features and gold occurrences.

== Biodiversity ==
The protected lakes, waterways, wetlands, old forests and remote forests support many species, such as brook trout, and mainland moose. It supports at least four species of rare lichens, including the endangered boreal felt lichen. The forest productivity is generally low, with dominant tree species such as white pine, red spruce, balsam fir, red maple, white birch and other hardwoods.

== History ==
Ship Harbour Long Lake Wilderness Area was the largest roadless piece of land left in Halifax County before designation. A logging road was approved into the area in 2001, despite protests from environmentalists. The wilderness area was proposed in May 2006, when it was a candidate area with an approximate size of 14,187 hectares (35,060 acres), and it was designated in 2009. Since then, the wilderness area was expanded by 332 hectares (820 acres) in 2012, 929 hectares (2,300 acres) in 2015, and 521 hectares (1,290 acres) in 2020, under the Wilderness Areas Protection Act.

=== Consultation ===
Feedback of the proposal was generally positive. Most people recognized that the wilderness area added ecological and recreational features. People also recognized that the proposed area would help with management, enforcement and stewardship of the wilderness area.

Some land has been added at the end of the designation, including Reid Hill, Murchyville Road, Fish River, Ship Harbour Long Lake, Portapique lake, Fishing Lake, Lays Lake Road, and Crown land inholdings. There is also exclusions, such as the Touquoy Project, Gold Lake, the western part of Lake Charlotte, and Ogilvie Brook.

== Recreation ==
Ship Harbour Long Lake Wilderness Area offers a range of opportunities for wilderness recreation and nature-based tourism, including angling, hunting, canoeing and hiking. The area is commonly explored by canoe and other small watercraft.

== Cultural heritage ==
Ship Harbour Long Lake Wilderness Area has several cultural heritages. Most important of the heritages are Mi’kmaq sites discovered in the area or near its boundary. Artifacts discovered indicate a continuous occupation, dating back an approximate 1,300 years. Historical European artifacts has been found as well.

The archaeological values in the wilderness area are protected under the Special Places Protection Act. The sites are highly valued and sensitive to disturbance, particularly from erosion from activities, such as heavy foot traffic or site development. These make the wilderness area potential for research and education opportunities.

== Routes ==
Ship Harbour Long Lake Wilderness Area can be reached via Moose River Road, which branches off from Nova Scotia Highway 7. Alternatively, it can be reached via Off Lays Lake Road, and Murchyville road. Part of the wilderness area can be experienced on foot via hiking trails that form the part of Musquodoboit Trailways system. However, many of these forest access roads do not receive routine maintenance.

== See also ==
- List of protected areas of Nova Scotia
- Lake Charlotte, Nova Scotia
- Gold Lake, Nova Scotia
