= Big Ass (disambiguation) =

Big Ass is a Thai rock band. The term may also refer to:

- A slang term for one's buttocks affected by Steatopygia.
- Big Ass Spider!, a 2013 horror comedy film.
- Big Ass Truck, an American rock band.
- "Big Ass Heart," a song featured on the Glee episode "Original Song."
- "Big Ass Show," a festival hosted by American commercial radio station KXRK.
- "Big Ass Lake", a lake in Halifax, Nova Scotia.
- Chris Rock: Big Ass Jokes, the first HBO special by American comedian Chris Rock.
- Big Ass Fans, an American company which manufactures high-volume low-speed fans.
