= Eunice Lake =

Eunice Lake may refer to:

- Eunice Lake (Pierce County, Washington)
- Eunice Lake (Nova Scotia)
