= Eunice Lake (Nova Scotia) =

Lake in Nova Scotia, Canada

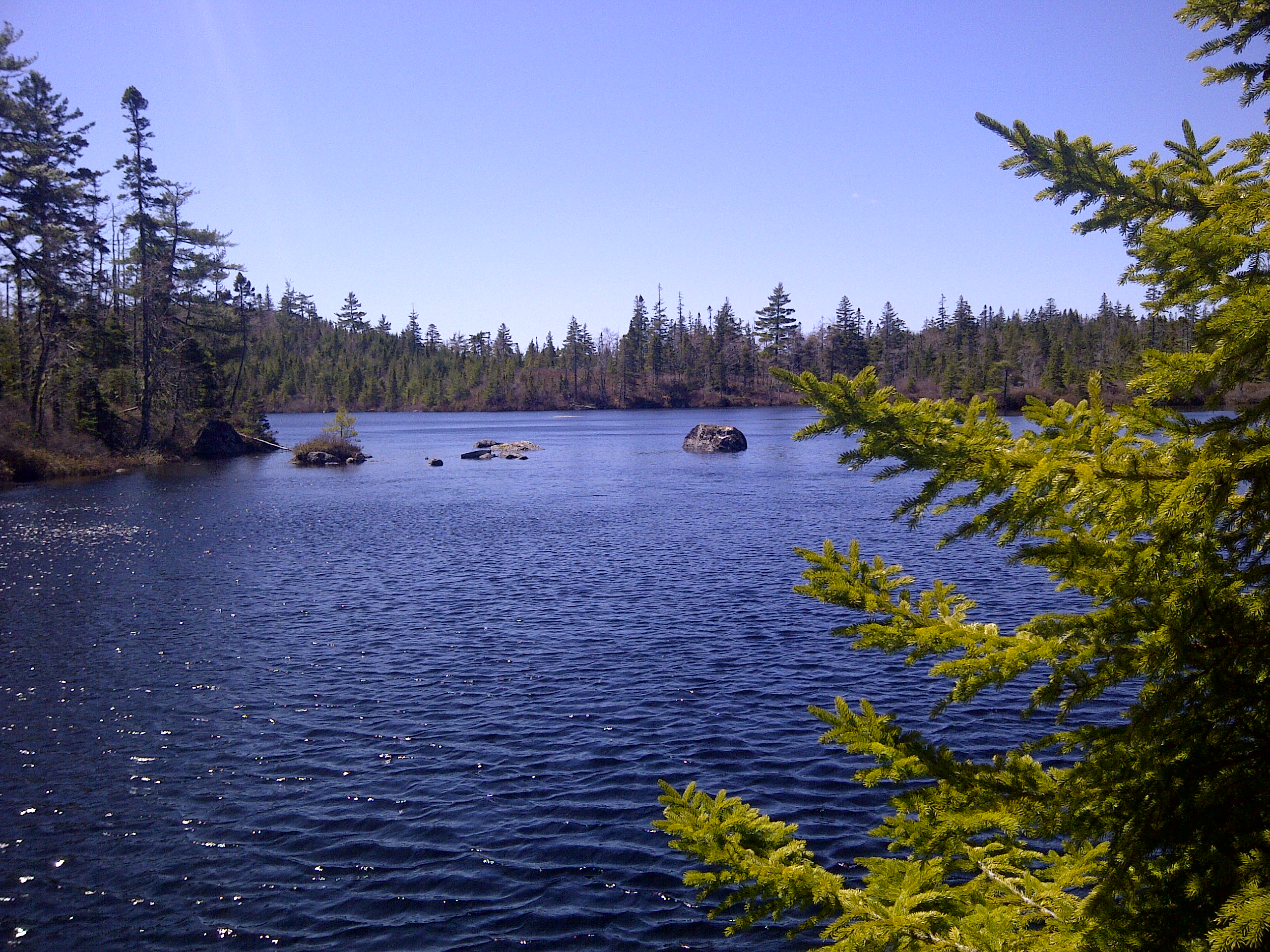

- Location within Nova Scotia
- Location: Halifax County, Nova Scotia
- Coordinates: 44.8115°N 63.1482°W
- Type: Glacial Lake
- Basin countries: Canada
- Max. length: 300 m (980 ft)
- Max. width: 150 m (490 ft)
- Surface elevation: 50 m (160 ft)
- Islands: None

Eunice Lake is a lake located in the Ship Harbour Long Lake Wilderness Area in Nova Scotia, Canada. It can only be accessed by the Admiral Lake Loop of the Musquodoboit Trailways Association. The lake is about 320 meters long and 190 meters wide. The trailhead is about 2 kilometres (1.2 mi) north of Musquodoboit Harbour.

== Geographical Description ==
The lake is 50m AMSL and is very shallow, with a muddy bottom. It has several large rocks inside it and a high cliff on its north side. To its south lies a large ridge of rock, and beyond that lies a valley.

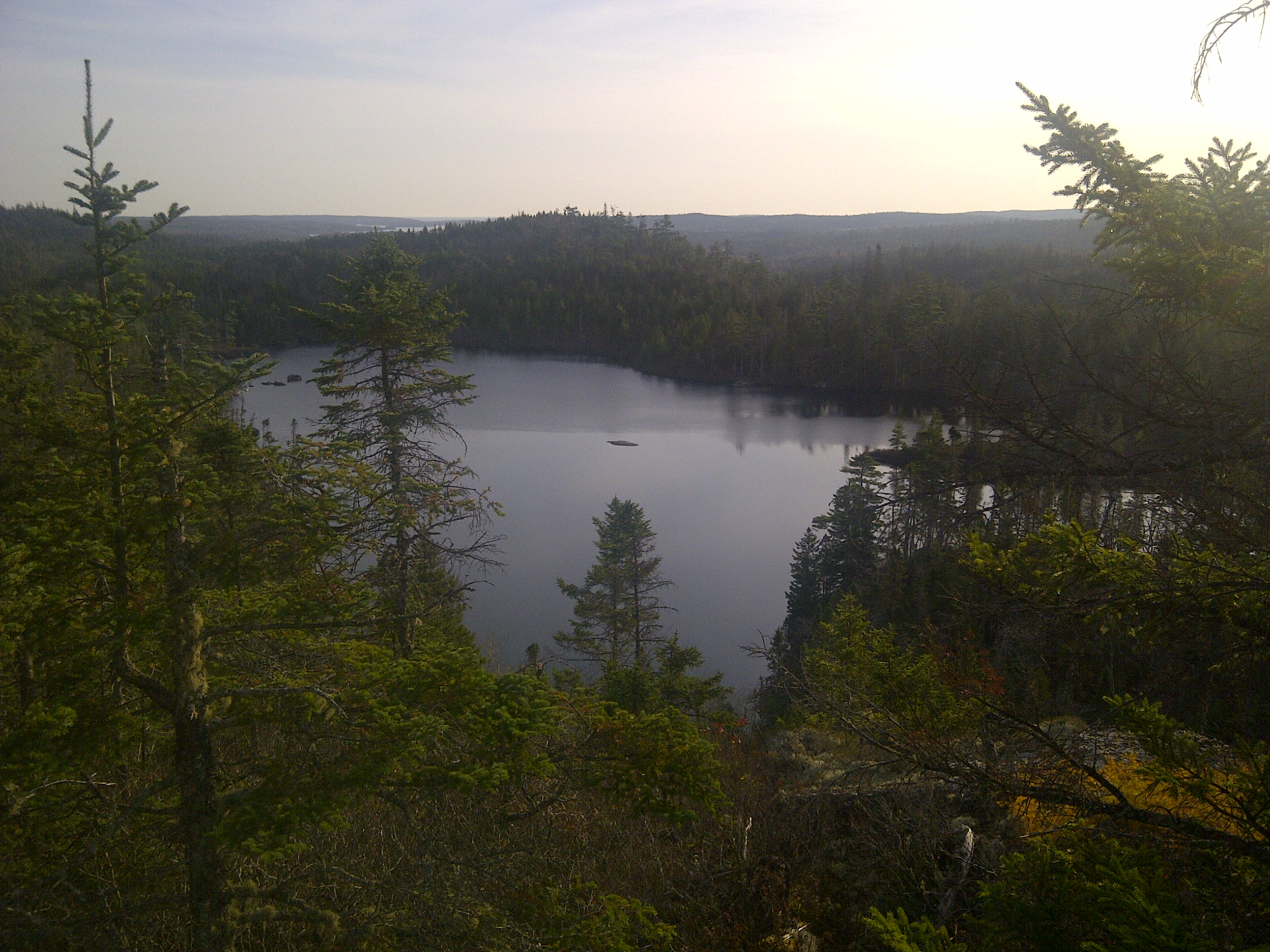
A view of Eunice Lake from above

== Access ==
It can only be accessed by the Admiral Lake Loop on the Musquodoboit Rail-Trail system. Other lakes encountered on the hike include Bayers Lake, Admiral Lake, and Little Lake.

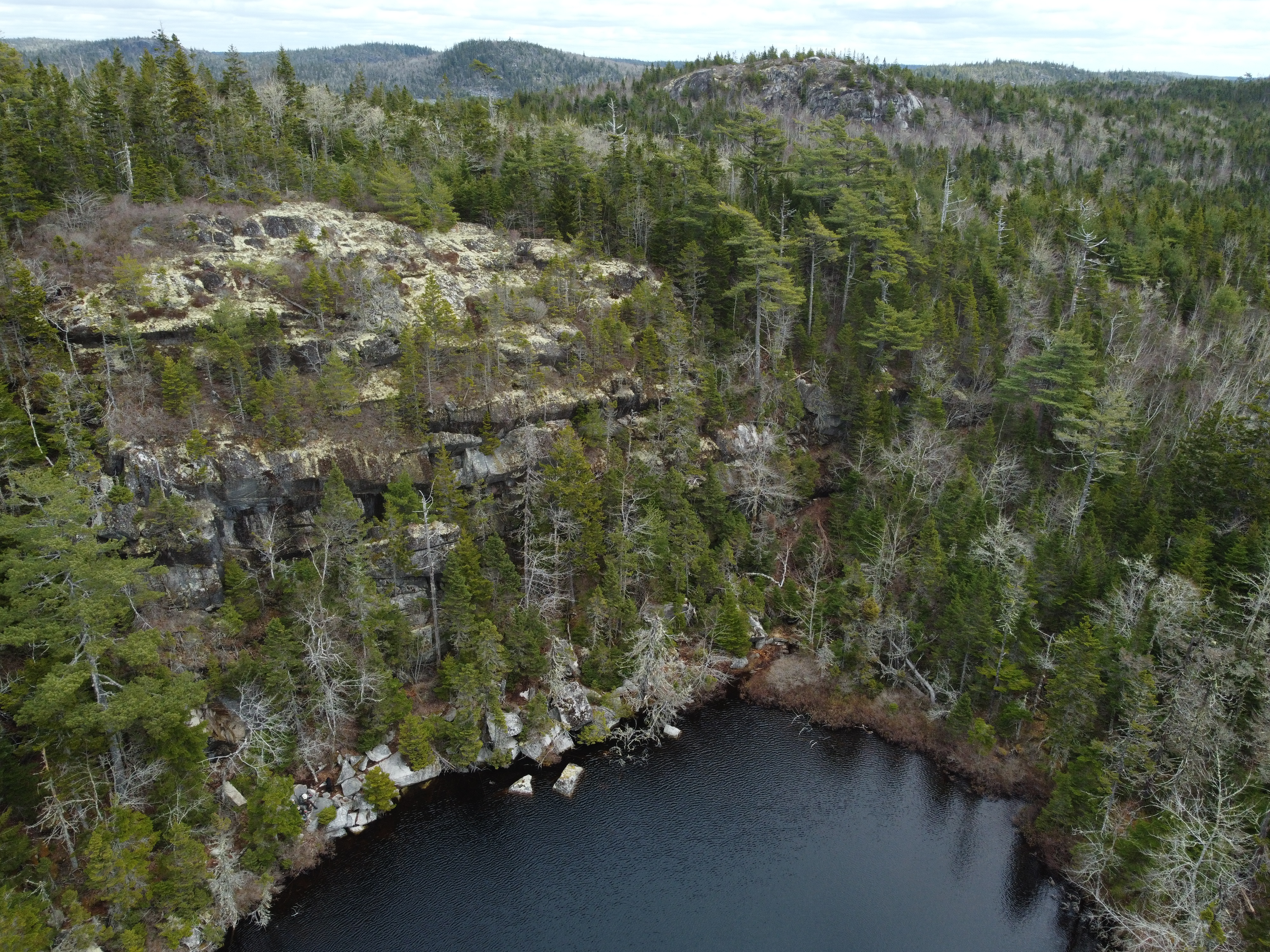
The cliff on the north side of Eunice Lake.
