= Tangier Grand Lake Wilderness Area =

Wilderness area in Nova Scotia, Canada

- IUCN category Ib (wilderness area)
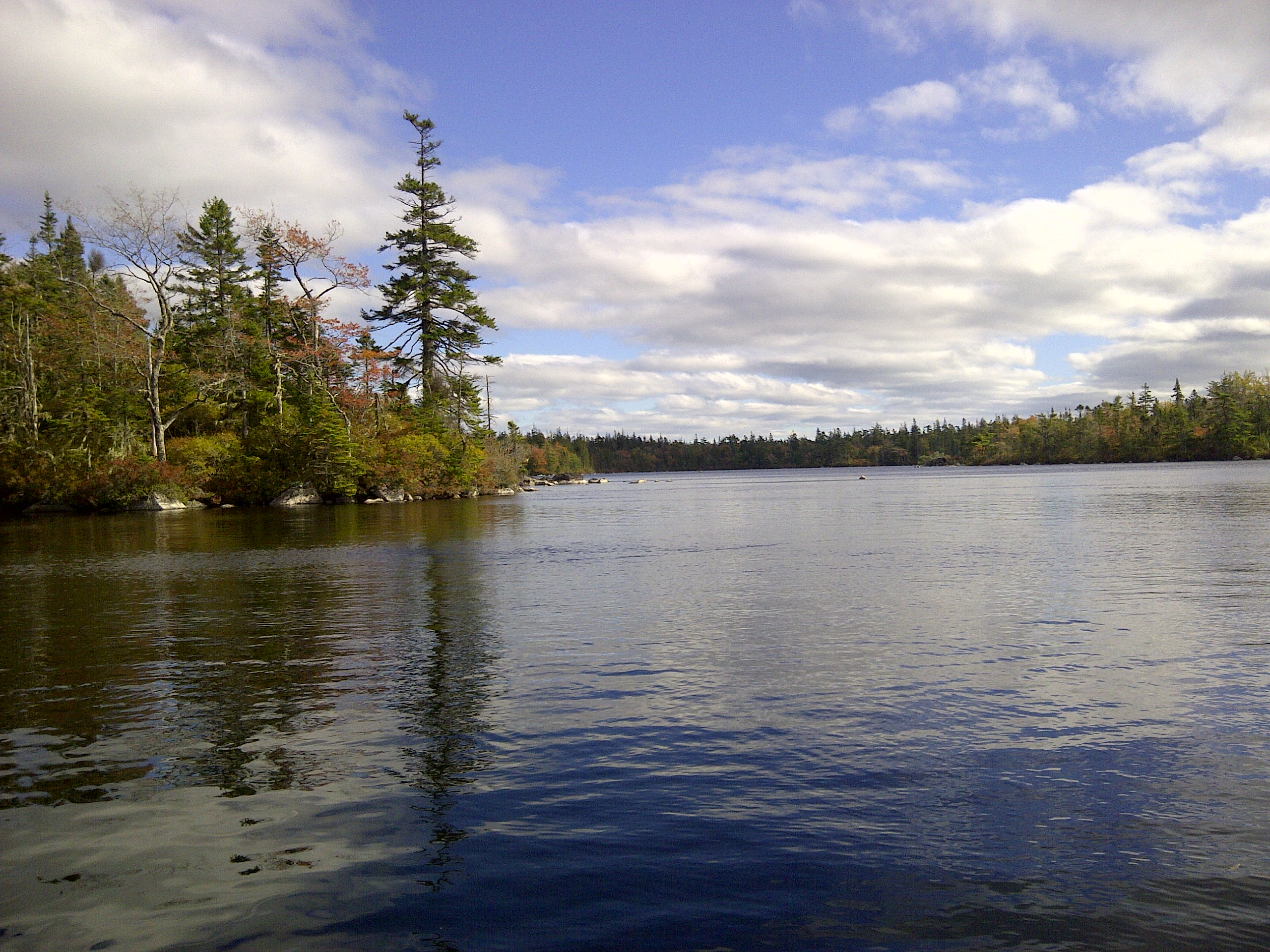
- Interactive map of Tangier Grand Lake Wilderness Area
- Location: Nova Scotia, Canada
- Nearest city: Tangier, Nova Scotia, Halifax, Nova Scotia
- Coordinates: 44°52′58″N 62°49′10″W
- Area: 16,170 ha (161.7 km^{2})
- Governing body: Nova Scotia Department of Natural Resources

Tangier Grand Lake Wilderness Area is a relatively large wilderness area located within the province of Nova Scotia, Canada, centered on its namesake lake, Tangier Grand Lake, the largest lake in Nova Scotia which does not have direct road access.

== Description ==
The region of the province in which the wilderness area is located is known as 'Wospegeak' to the Mi'kmaq, which translates to "sunshine is reflected from water". This name is well-suited, for the wilderness area contains nearly 30 lakes of various sizes, with rugged conifer forest in between them. This landscape was created by glaciation; thick ice sheets scraped across the surface of the 350-million year old granite of the Eastern Shore Granite Ridge for thousands of years. When the ice melted about 10,000 years ago, it left boulders scattered throughout the region, along with an undulating landscape of parallel ridges and deposits of glacial debris. Over time, the low spots filled with water and became lakes, while higher locations with deeper and richer soils support hardwoods such as yellow birch and sugar maple.

== Recreation ==
There are few hiking trails located within the wilderness area, in part due to its remote location. The rugged topography has also discouraged modern logging prior to the creation of the wilderness area, resulting in the wilderness area having few logging roads. As a result, most travel through the wilderness area is done by canoe. One route starts at Scraggy Lake and goes via Loon Pond, Otter Lake, Egg Lake, and Shellbird Lake to enter Tangier Grand Lake. From there, the route heads to Southwest Cove, then Crooked Lake, and finally Blue Woods Lake. Alternatively, it is possible to skip Tangier Grand Lake and go into Blue Woods Lake via Loon Lake and Devils Lakes. The route continues through Bear, Rabbit, and Squirrel Lakes, before going into Boot Lake, North East Lake, and finally ending at Little River Lake. This route is very isolated, and takes several days to complete.
