= Moose River Gold Mines =

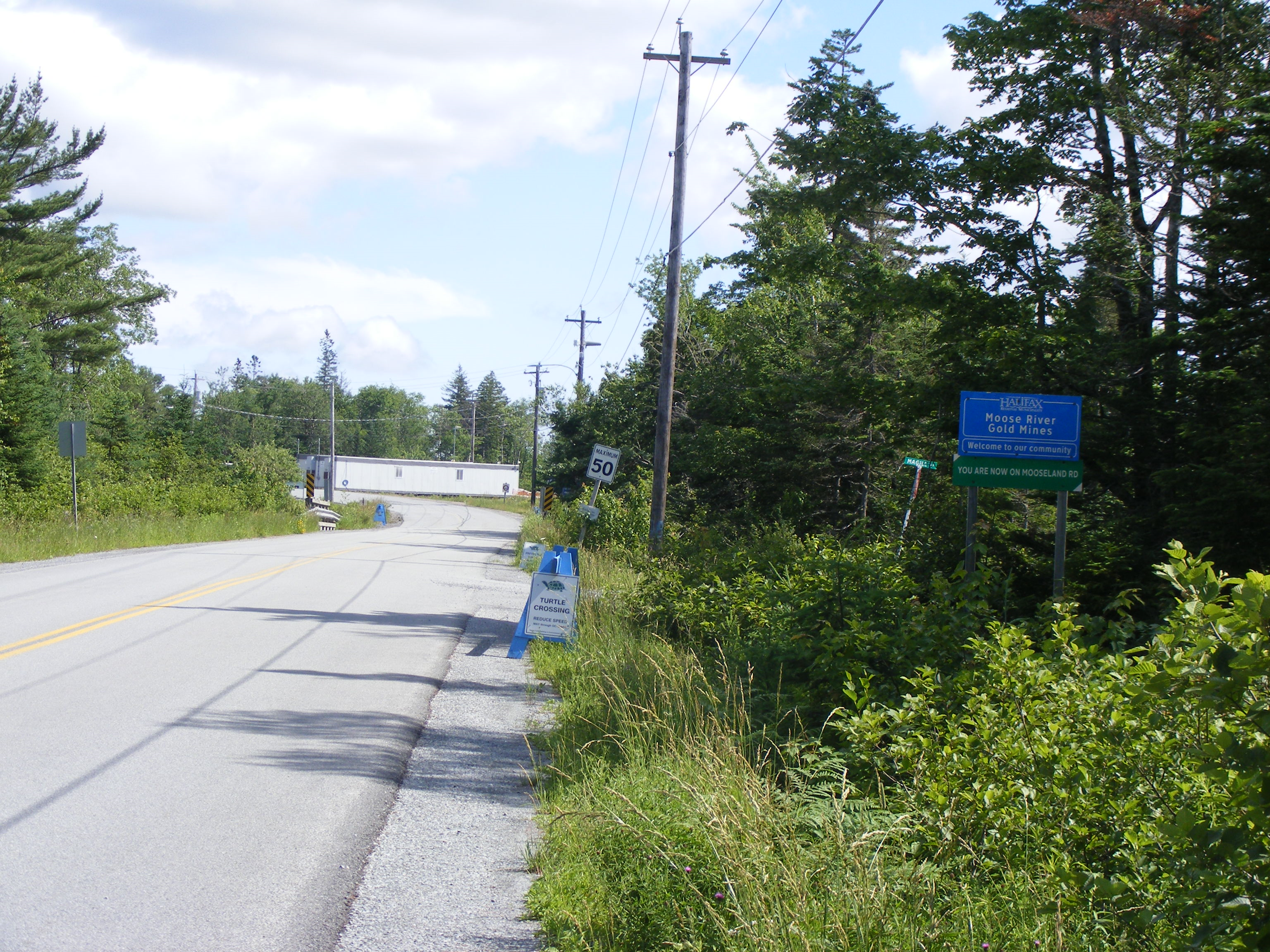

- Location within Nova Scotia
- Coordinates: 44°59′03″N 62°56′34″W
- Country: Canada
- Province: Nova Scotia
- Municipality: Halifax Regional Municipality

Government
  - Governing Council: Halifax Regional Council
- Time zone: UTC−4 (AST)
  - Summer (DST): UTC−3 (ADT)
- Part of a series about Places in Nova Scotia

Moose River Gold Mines is a Canadian rural community located in Nova Scotia's Halifax Regional Municipality. It is at the junction of Moose River Road and Mooseland Road. No numbered highways run through Moose River Gold Mines. Gold was discovered in the area in 1866 and mining started in the 1870s. Interest waned around 1900 but rose in the 1930s. The community gained international attention in 1936 when three men were trapped in the mine.

== History ==
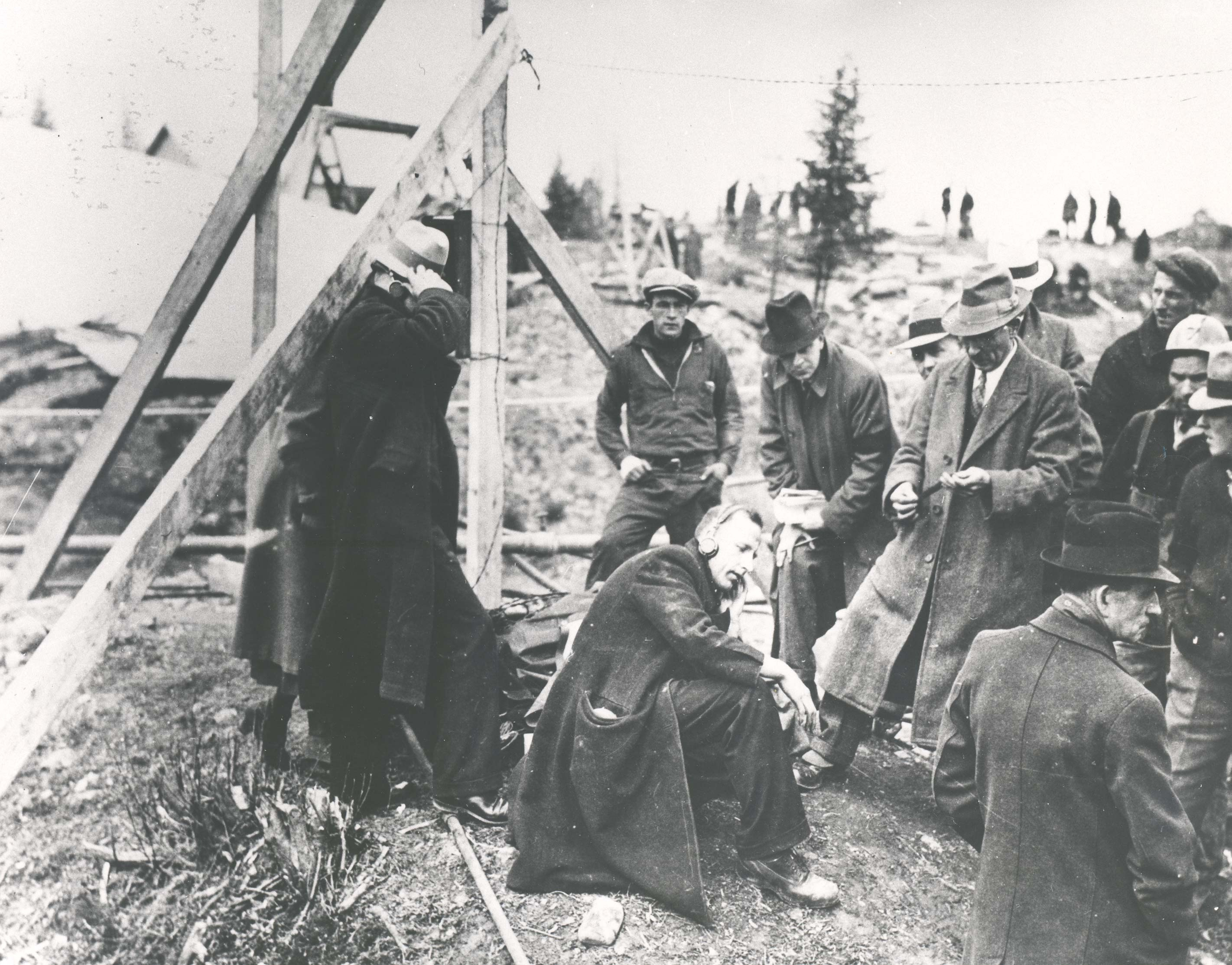
J. Allister Bowman, district plant superintendent, Maritime Tel & Tel, using earphones to listen for entombed men

Gold was first discovered in the area in 1866, but no mining took place until the 1870s when the area became known as the Moose River Gold District. Interest waned in the early 1900s but resumed in the 1930s and the mine was brought back into production in 1935. These historic workings produced some 25,917.2 troy ounces (806.12 kg) of gold, which was largely taken from quartz veins, but some also from open slate quarries.

=== 1936 disaster ===
On April 12, 1936, the roof of the mine collapsed, trapping three men, Herman Magill, David Robertson, and Alfred Scadding, 150 feet (46 m) down for 11 days. The men were reached by drilling a borehole on the sixth day to bring food, water and a telephone until the rescue was completed. Robertson and Scadding survived and Magill died on the seventh day. The event was broadcast by J. Frank Willis of the Canadian Radio Broadcasting Commission (CRBC) to more than 650 radio stations throughout North America over the course of fifty-six hours, and was picked up by the BBC and broadcast to Europe. It was the first live 24-hour radio coverage of a breaking news story in Canada.

Draegerman Courage, an hour-long film directed by Louis King and based on the events surrounding the cave-in, was released in 1937.

== Museum and park ==
Today, there is a provincial park with a cairn and there was a plaque where the borehole was drilled, and there is a museum portraying the history of the gold mine. The plaque was stolen sometime before June 28, 2006. It has yet to be recovered.

=== Mining in the 21st century ===
In the 1980s, drilling exploration in the area of the earlier slate workings found significant gold deposits in what became known as the Touquoy zone, after a former mine owned by Damas Touquoy. DDV Gold Ltd. applied to operate an open pit gold mine in 2007. Deposits at the project named Touquoy hold an estimated 635,000 troy ounces (19.8 t) of gold, worth $700 million in 2012. The surface operation will involve drilling, blasting, and gold cyanidation to process the ore. The Moose River Gold Mines site will also process ore from the company's mine at its Beaver Dam deposit, 37 km away, which has an estimated yield of 426,600 troy ounces (13.27 t). This will save the construction of a second tailings pond, and an old bush road will be upgraded to facilitate transport. The Moose River mine will have a life of five years and Beaver Dam just three. There are more deposits at Cochrane Hill and Fifteen Mile Stream, 57 km away.

Despite the controversy of land expropriation, production is expected to begin in 2015 or 2016.

== See also ==
- Scraggy Lake
- Gold Lake
- Big Ass Lake
