= Tangier Grand Lake =

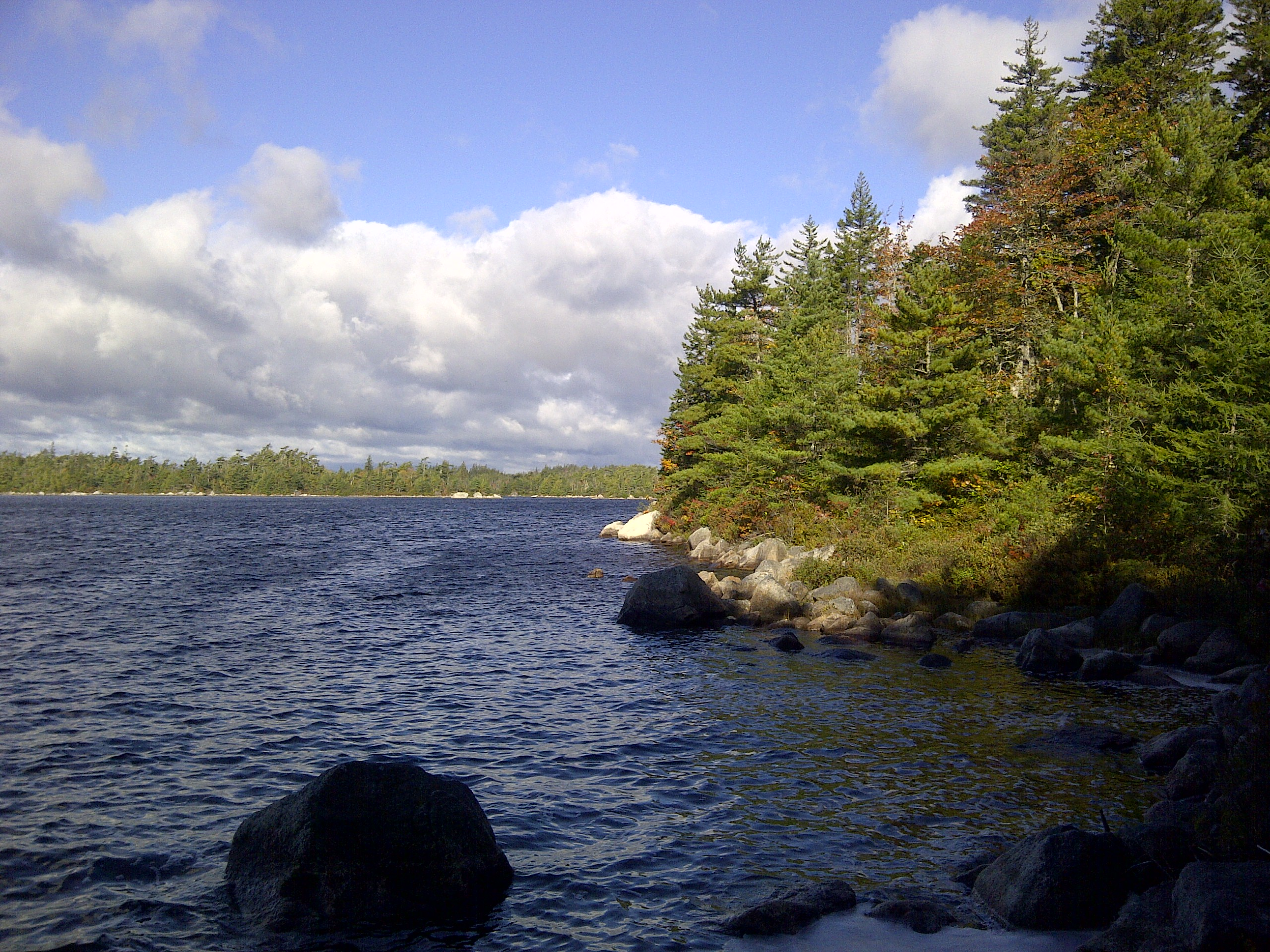
- Fox Point, located near the centre of Tangier Grand Lake

- Location within Nova Scotia
- Location: Halifax Regional Municipality, Nova Scotia
- Coordinates: 44.888369°N 62.816891°W
- Type: Glacial Lake
- Primary inflows: Struggle Brook
- Primary outflows: Three Rivers Lake, then Tangier River
- Basin countries: Canada
- Max. length: 6 kilometres (3.7 mi)
- Max. width: 4 kilometres (2.5 mi)
- Average depth: ~ 5 metres (16 ft)
- Max. depth: 30 metres (98 ft)
- Surface elevation: 60 metres (200 ft)
- Islands: Many islands, large and small, scattered throughout the lake

Tangier Grand Lake is a lake in the Halifax Regional Municipality of Nova Scotia, Canada. It is located near Mooseland, Nova Scotia.

== Description ==
Tangier Grand Lake is full of islands, from the largest island, which is 600 metres (2,000 ft) long and 300 metres (980 ft) wide, to very small islands, scattered throughout the western and eastern arms. It is, for the most part, relatively shallow, but it has a relatively deep spot with a depth of approximately 30 metres (98 ft) in its centre. The lake is located on the Eastern Shore Granite Ridge, an area of 350-million year old granite bedrock. It is the largest lake in the province that does not have direct road access.

== History ==
The remnants of a sluice, once used in log driving, can be found on Struggle Brook, one of the primary inflows into Tangier Grand Lake from Crooked Lake.

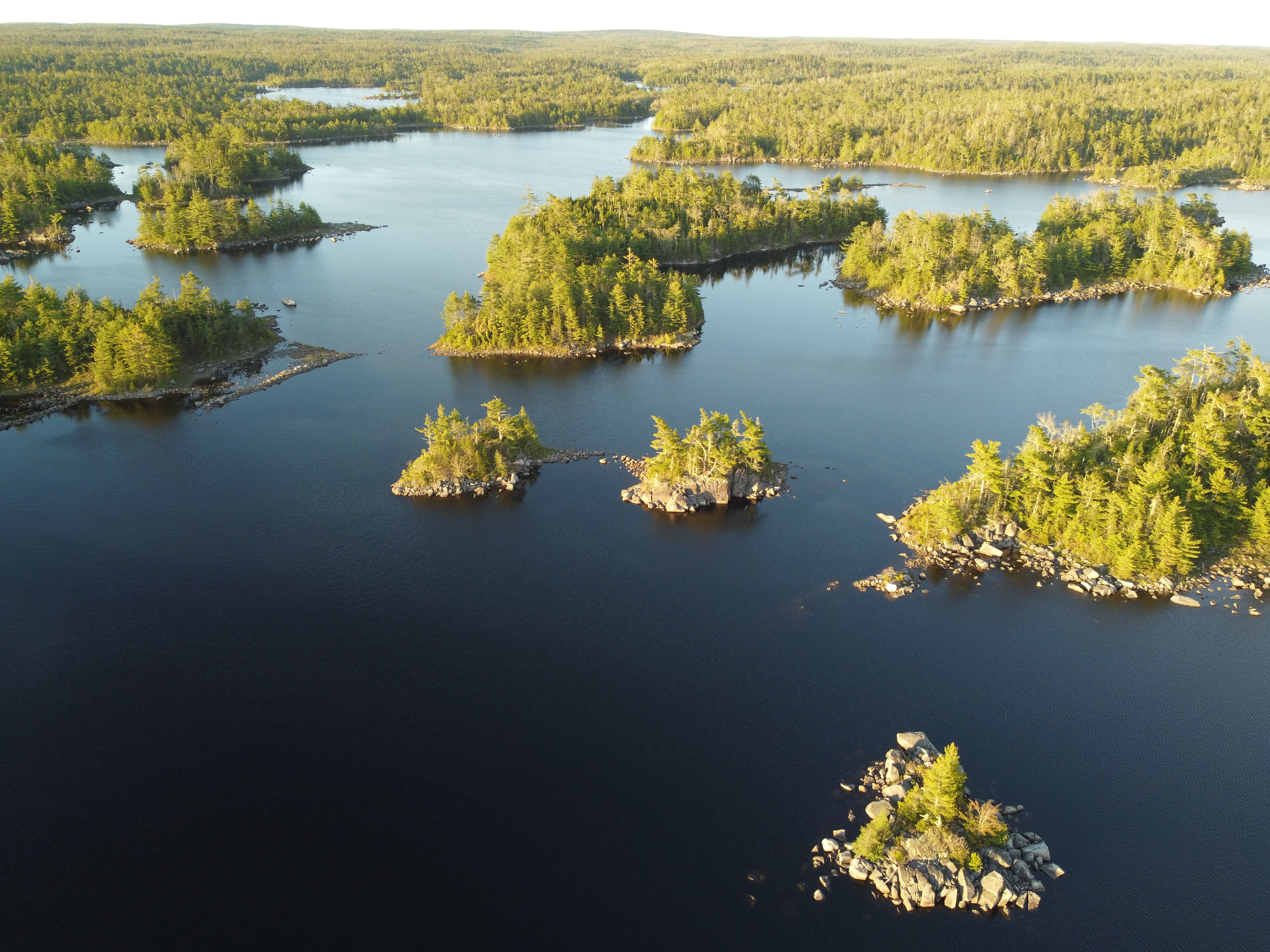
Aerial photograph of some of the islands in the northeastern portion of Tangier Grand Lake.

== See also ==
- List of lakes in Nova Scotia
- Mooseland, Nova Scotia
- Lake Alma, Nova Scotia
