= White Lake Wilderness Area =

Wilderness area in Nova Scotia, Canada

- IUCN category Ib (wilderness area)
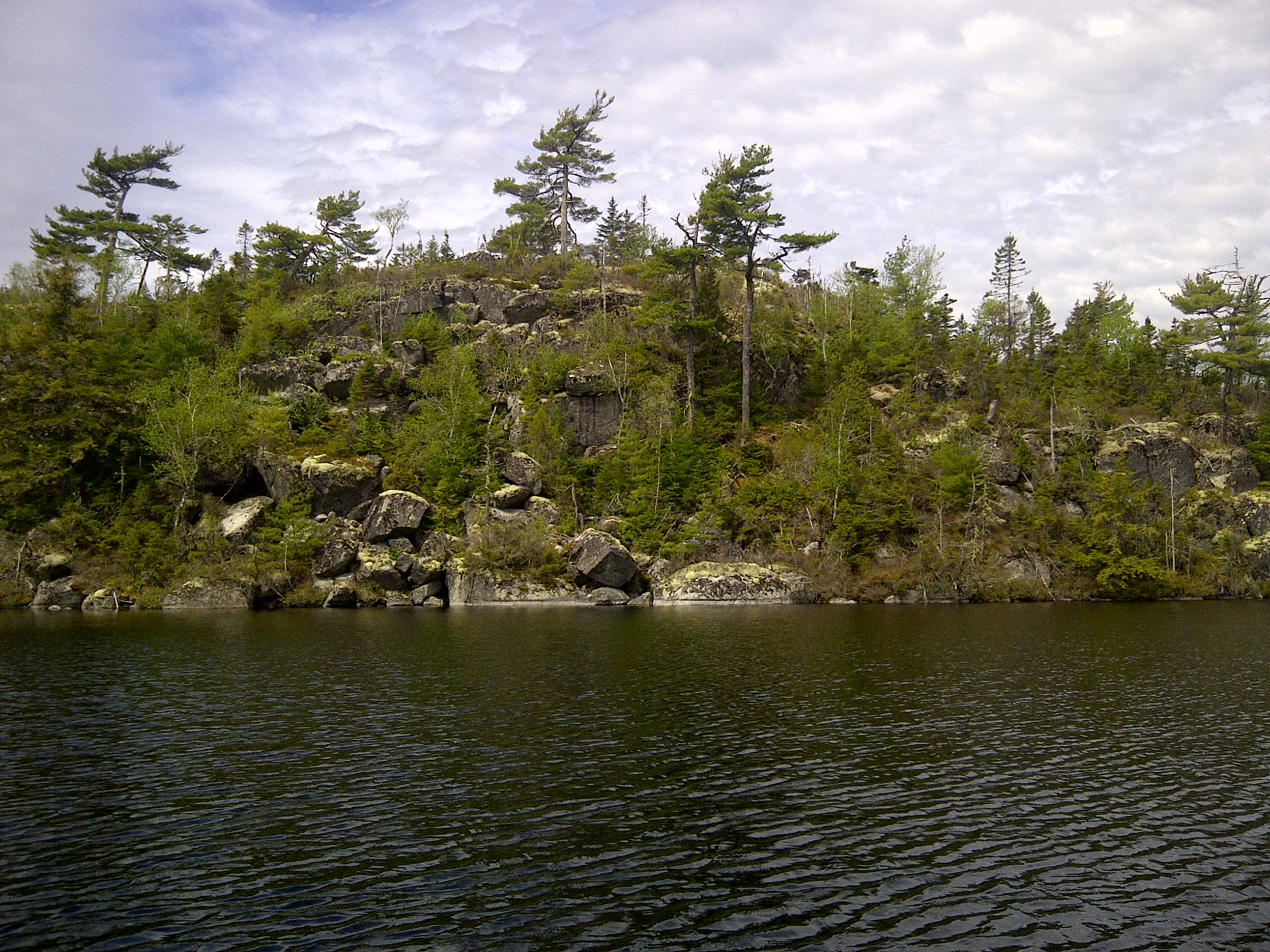
- The western shoreline of Sparrow Lake, located in the White Lake Wilderness Area
- Interactive map of White Lake Wilderness Area
- Location: Nova Scotia, Canada
- Nearest city: Musquodoboit Harbour, Nova Scotia, Halifax, Nova Scotia
- Coordinates: 44°51′09″N 63°11′00″W
- Area: 4,540 ha (45.4 km^{2})
- Governing body: Nova Scotia Department of Natural Resources

The White Lake Wilderness Area is a wilderness area located in Nova Scotia, Canada, in Halifax Regional Municipality. Several trails, all maintained by the Musquodoboit Trailways Association, pass through it; Gibraltar Rock Loop, White Lake Wilderness Trails, the Musquodoboit Rail Trail, the Bayers Lake Loop, and the Admiral Lake loop. Access to much of the remainder of the wilderness area is possible only by canoe, requiring multiple portages to get to some of the more remote lakes.

The Wilderness area was established in the early 1990s as a commitment to protect certain areas of Nova Scotia that displayed unique terrain, fauna and/or flora. In the case of the White Lake Wilderness Area, this flora and fauna is rugged, lake-strewn, conifer forest. Inside the wilderness area are some 350-million-year-old bare granite ridges and knolls, white spruce and balsam fir forests, with some groves of 100-year-old hemlock and the occasional large White Pine. Hardwoods, including White Birch, Red Maple, and Sugar Maple, can be found in some of the more protected valleys.

== Notable features ==
- Musquodoboit River
- Eunice Lake
- Bayers Lake
- Admiral Lake
- Granite Lake
- Turtle Lake
- White Lake
