= Mooseland, Nova Scotia =

Community in eastern Nova Scotia, Canada

Coordinates: 44°55′58.8″N 62°47′41.3″W

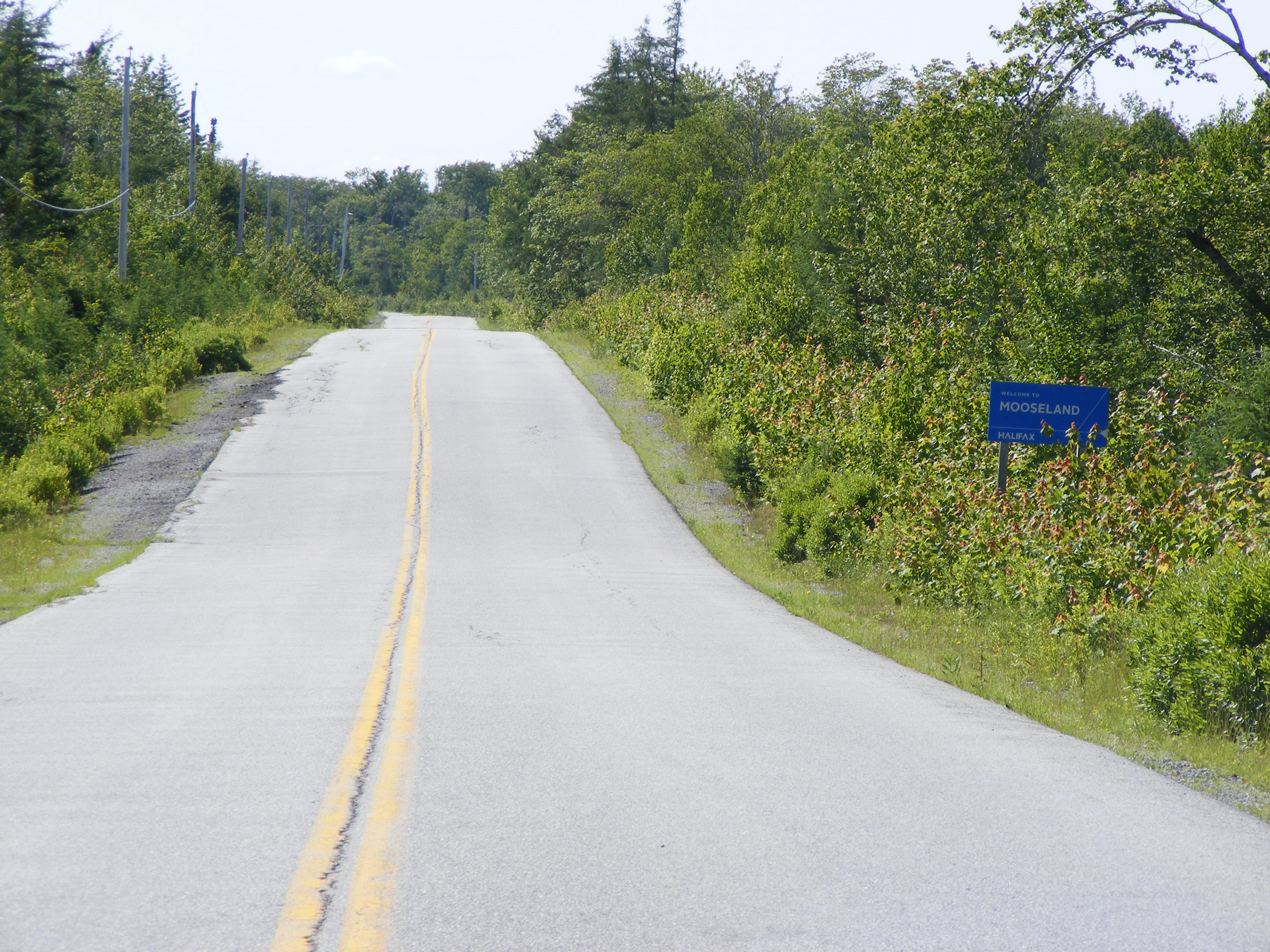
Mooseland, July 2023.

Mooseland in Nova Scotia

Mooseland is a small rural community in the Eastern Shore area of Halifax Regional Municipality, Nova Scotia, on the Mooseland Road, 68 kilometres (42 mi) northeast of Halifax. The area is known to have deposits of gold and is the site of the first gold discovery in Nova Scotia.

Mooseland is home to the Otter Ponds Demonstration Forest, a community forest initiative on publicly owned lands that aims to demonstrate uneven aged forest management and restoration of the Acadian Forest along the Eastern Shore. The Otter Ponds Forest is approximately 1600 acres (647 hectares; 2.5 sq mi) that straddles the Tangier River and is composed of a diverse range of conifer and deciduous forests.

== Communications ==
- Postal code – B0J 3H0
- Telephone exchange – 902-772

== Demographics ==
- Population – 99
- Dwellings – 134
- Land area – 326.57 square kilometres (126.09 mi^{2})
