= Halifax County, Nova Scotia =

Halifax County
- County
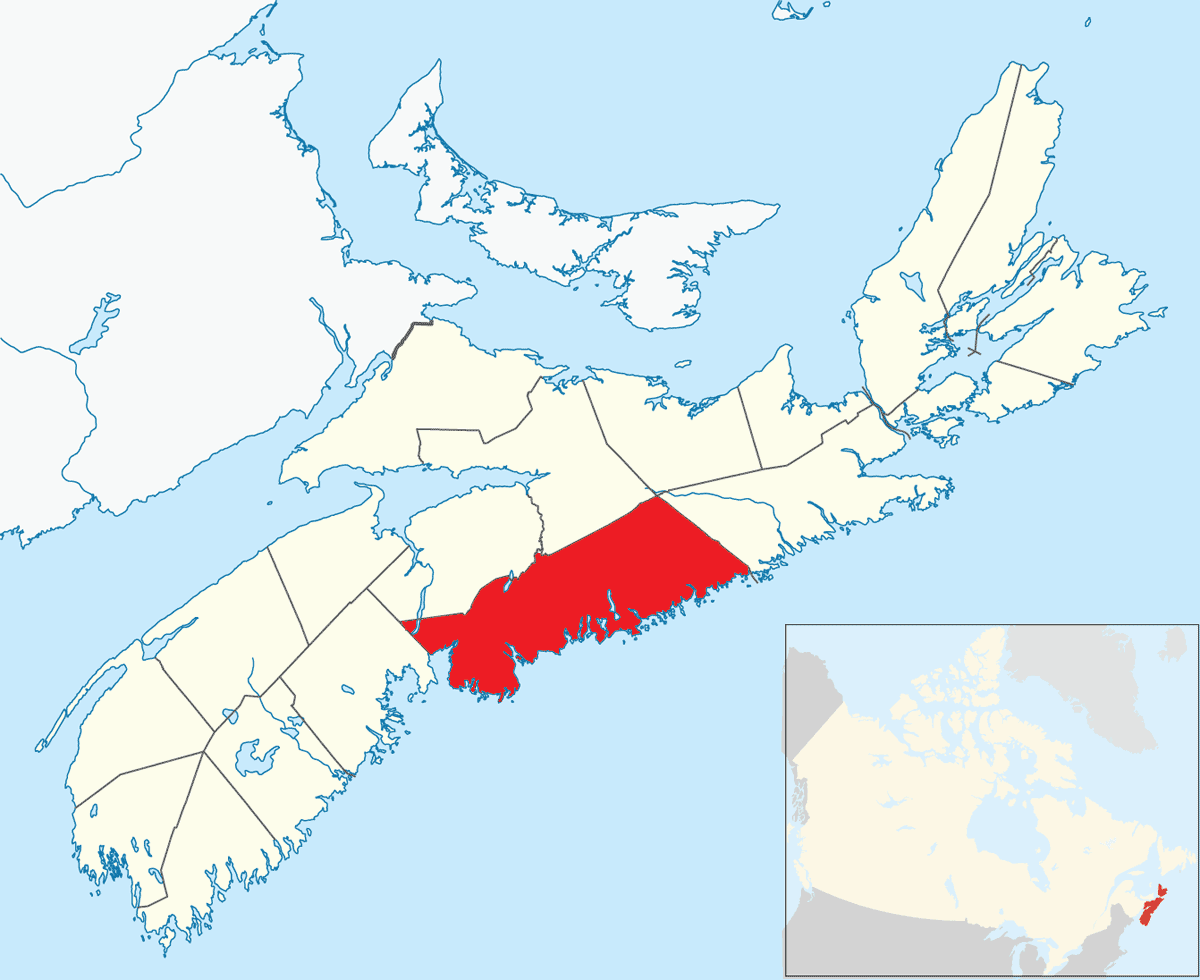
- Location of Halifax County in Nova Scotia
- Coordinates: 44.9°N 63.1°W
- Country: Canada
- Province: Nova Scotia
- Established: August 17, 1759
- Incorporated county: April 17, 1879
- Dissolved into the Halifax Regional Municipality: April 1, 1996

Government
  - Type: Regional Council
  - Present governing council: Halifax Regional Council

Area
  - Total: 5,557.29 km^{2} (2,145.68 sq mi)

Population (1996)
  - Total: 342,966
  - Density: 61.7146/km^{2} (159.840/sq mi)
- Time zone: UTC-4 (AST)
- Area code: 902
- Median earnings (Note: Median household income, 2021 (all households)): $81,000
- Website: https://halifax.ca

Halifax County (Scottish Gaelic: Siorramachd Haileafaics; French: Comté de Halifax) is a county in the Canadian province of Nova Scotia.

== History ==
Deriving its name from George Montagu-Dunk, 2nd Earl of Halifax (1716–1771), Halifax County was established by order-in-council on August 17, 1759. The boundaries of four other counties – Annapolis, Kings, Cumberland and Lunenburg – were specifically defined at that time, with Halifax County comprising all the part of peninsular Nova Scotia that was not within their limits.

Following the end of the Seven Years' War in 1763, Cape Breton Island was formally annexed to Nova Scotia until 1784 when it became a separate colony. From 1763 to 1784, Cape Breton Island formed part of Halifax County.

Cape Breton Island ceased being a separate colony and was reannexed to Nova Scotia in 1820. The boundary of Halifax County was further modified in 1822. That part of St. Mary's Township (established in 1818) which had been in Halifax County was annexed to and included within Sydney County; "Sydney County" was a historic county that included all of Cape Breton Island and present-day Antigonish and Guysborough counties.

The dividing line between the Districts of Halifax and Colchester, within Halifax County, was confirmed and established on May 3, 1828. In 1835, Halifax County was divided and the counties of Colchester and Pictou were created out of parts of what had previously been Halifax County. Eventually in 1880 the boundary between the Counties of Halifax and Colchester was fixed.

== Governance ==
Municipal government at the county level in Nova Scotia dates to proclamation of The County Incorporation Act on April 17, 1879, which saw the establishment of the Municipality of the County of Halifax.

The Municipality of the County of Halifax was the municipal government of Halifax County, apart from the separately incorporated towns and cities therein as well as several First Nation reserves. The county municipality was dissolved on April 1, 1996, together with those town and city municipal governments, and all were amalgamated into the Halifax Regional Municipality.

The boundaries of Halifax County and the Halifax Regional Municipality are approximately the same. The county, however, also includes five First Nations reserves.

Halifax County continues to exist as a county in Nova Scotia, but all municipal government and service delivery is provided by either the Halifax Regional Municipality or the respective First Nations, with no additional county level government or administration.

== Communities ==
Regional municipalities

- Halifax Regional Municipality

Reserves

- Beaver Lake 17
- Cole Harbour 30
- Sheet Harbour 36
- Shubenacadie 13
- Wallace Hills 14A

== Demographics ==
As a census division in the 2021 Census of Population conducted by Statistics Canada, Halifax County had a population of 440,072 living in 190,650 of its 200,619 total private dwellings, a change of 9.1% from its 2016 population of 403,390. With a land area of 5,477.53 km^{2} (2,114.89 sq mi), it had a population density of 80.3/km^{2} (208.1/sq mi) in 2021.
