= Chaswood, Nova Scotia =

Community in Nova Scotia, Canada

Coordinates: 45°02′51″N 63°12′38″W

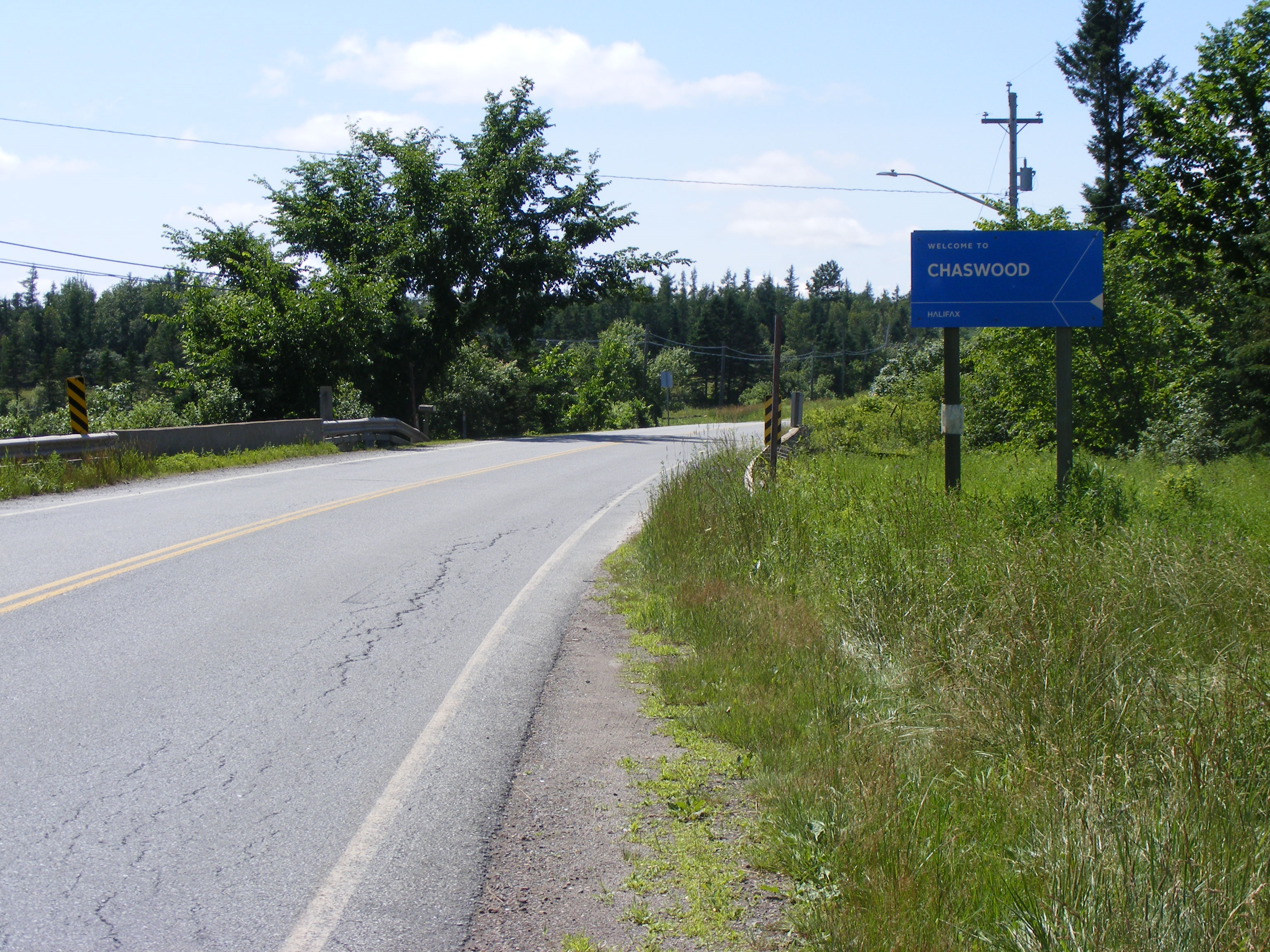
Chaswood, July 2023

Chaswood in Nova Scotia

Chaswood (formerly named Taylorville) is a rural community in the Musquodoboit Valley northwest of Middle Musquodoboit in Nova Scotia, Canada. Chaswood is named in honour of Charles Carroll Wood.

Chaswood is located in the Halifax Regional Municipality. Chaswood is situated in the Southwest Branch Musquodoboit. Other communities in this branch include, Cooks Brook, Carrolls Corner, and Dutch Settlement. Before Taylorville, Chaswood was called Charleswood, only later to be shortened to Chaswood. The first post office and general store in Chaswood were located across from the Walter Webster homestead.
