= Nova Scotia Route 357 =

Highway in Nova Scotia, Canada

Route 357

Route information
- Maintained by Nova Scotia Department of Transportation and Infrastructure Renewal
- Length: 39 km (24 mi)

Major junctions
- South end: Trunk 7 in Musquodoboit Harbour
- Route 212 in Elderbank
- North end: Route 224 in Middle Musquodoboit

Location
- Country: Canada
- Province: Nova Scotia

Highway system
- Provincial highways in Nova Scotia; 100-series
← Route 354	→ Route 358

Route 357 is a collector road in the Canadian province of Nova Scotia. It is located in the Halifax Regional Municipality and connects Musquodoboit Harbour at Trunk 7 with Middle Musquodoboit at Route 224.

It closely follows the Musquodoboit River.

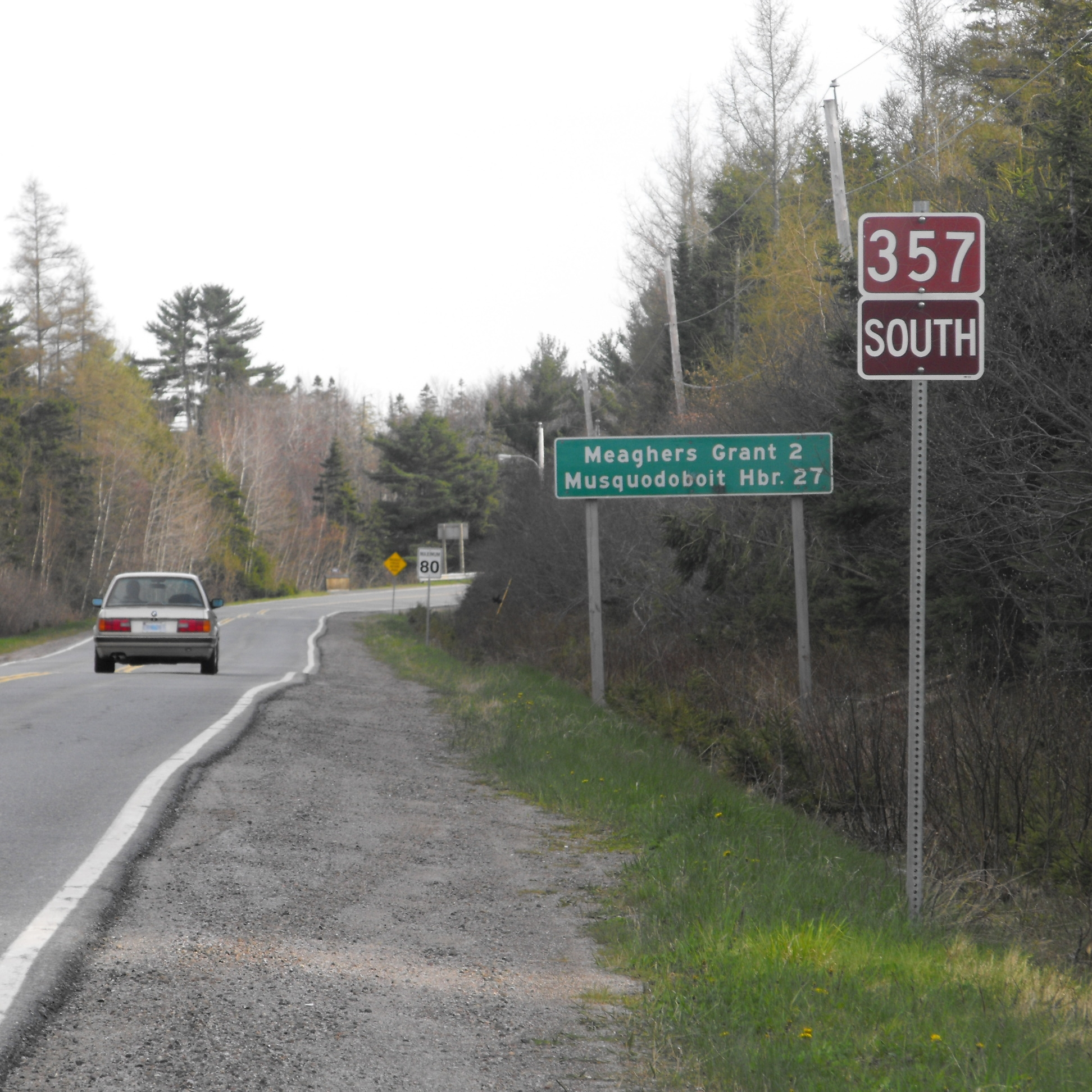
Nova Scotia Route 357

== Communities ==
- Musquodoboit Harbour
- Meaghers Grant
- Gibraltar
- Elderbank
- Middle Musquodoboit

== Parks ==
- Elderbank Provincial Park
- Gibraltar Rock Provincial Park Reserve

== See also ==
- List of Nova Scotia provincial highways
