= Musquodoboit Valley =

- Valley
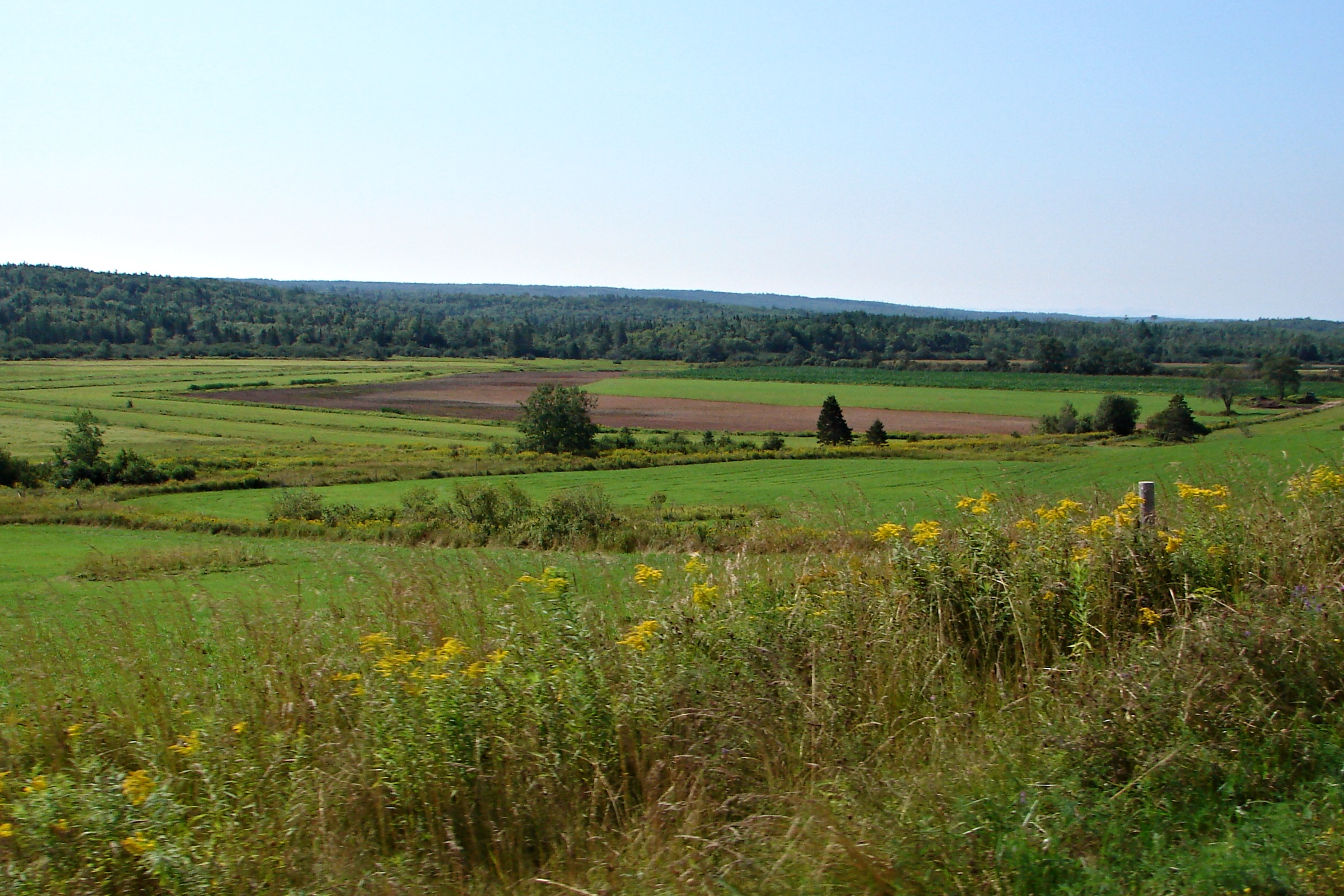
- Musquodoboit Valley at Greenwood

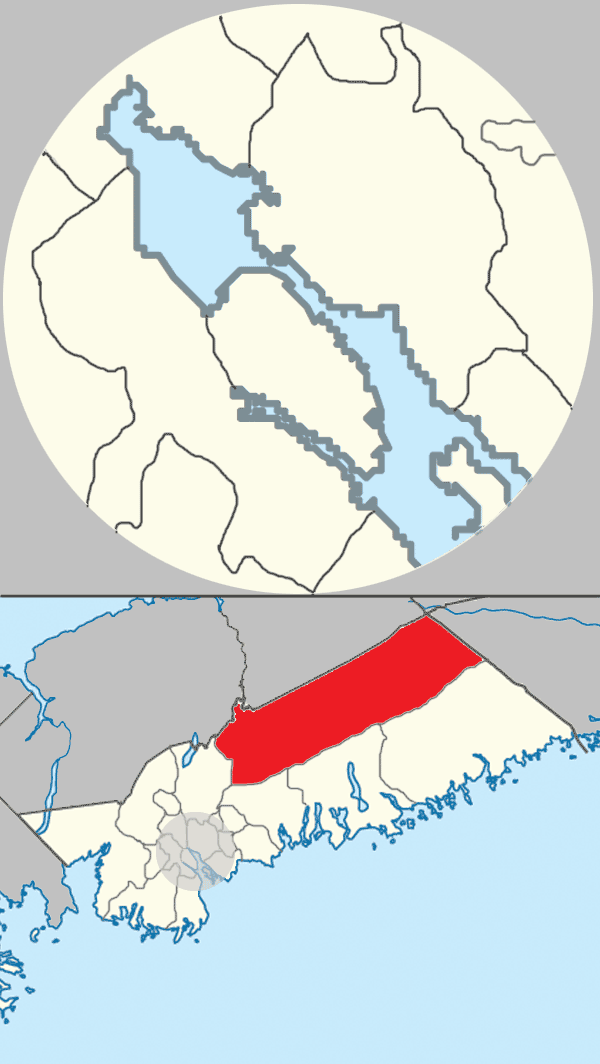
- Map of Musquodoboit Valley/Dutch Settlement planning area in Halifax, Nova Scotia

- Location within Nova Scotia
- Coordinates: 45°02′35″N 63°09′06″W
- Country: Canada
- Province: Nova Scotia
- Municipality: Halifax Regional Municipality

Area
  - Total: 714 km^{2} (276 sq mi)
- Time zone: UTC-4 (AST)
  - Summer (DST): UTC-3 (ADT)
- Communities: Caribou Mines, Chaplin, Dean, Pleasant Valley, Sheet Harbour Road, Upper Musquodoboit, Fraser Settlement, Kent, Centre Musquodoboit, Reid, Newcomb Corner, Lindsay Lake, Elmsvale, Higginsville, Brookvale, Glenmore, Middle Musquodoboit, South Section, Murchyville, Mooseland, Chaswood, Cooks Brook, Carrolls Corner, Elderbank, Lake Egmont, Meaghers Grant, Meagher, Lower Meaghers Grant, Musquodoboit Harbour, Greenwood
- Highways: Route 212; Route 224; Route 336; Route 357
- Website: www.musquodoboitvalley.ca

The Musquodoboit Valley (/ˌmʌskəˈdɒbɪt/ MUS-kə-DOB-it) is a valley and region in the Halifax Regional Municipality of Nova Scotia, Canada. It is administratively located in the municipality's Musquodoboit Valley & Dutch Settlement planning area and the western edge of the valley includes communities that are considered part of the commutershed for the urban area of the Halifax Regional Municipality. The picturesque Musquodoboit River flows through majority of the valley, passing by most of the communities in the valley. The river is approximately 97 kilometres (60 mi) long and originates in the extreme northeastern area of the valley. The three largest communities in the valley are Upper Musquodoboit, Middle Musquodoboit and Musquodoboit Harbour. The word "Musquodoboit" is derived from the Mi’kmaq language and means "rolling out in foam".

== Geography ==
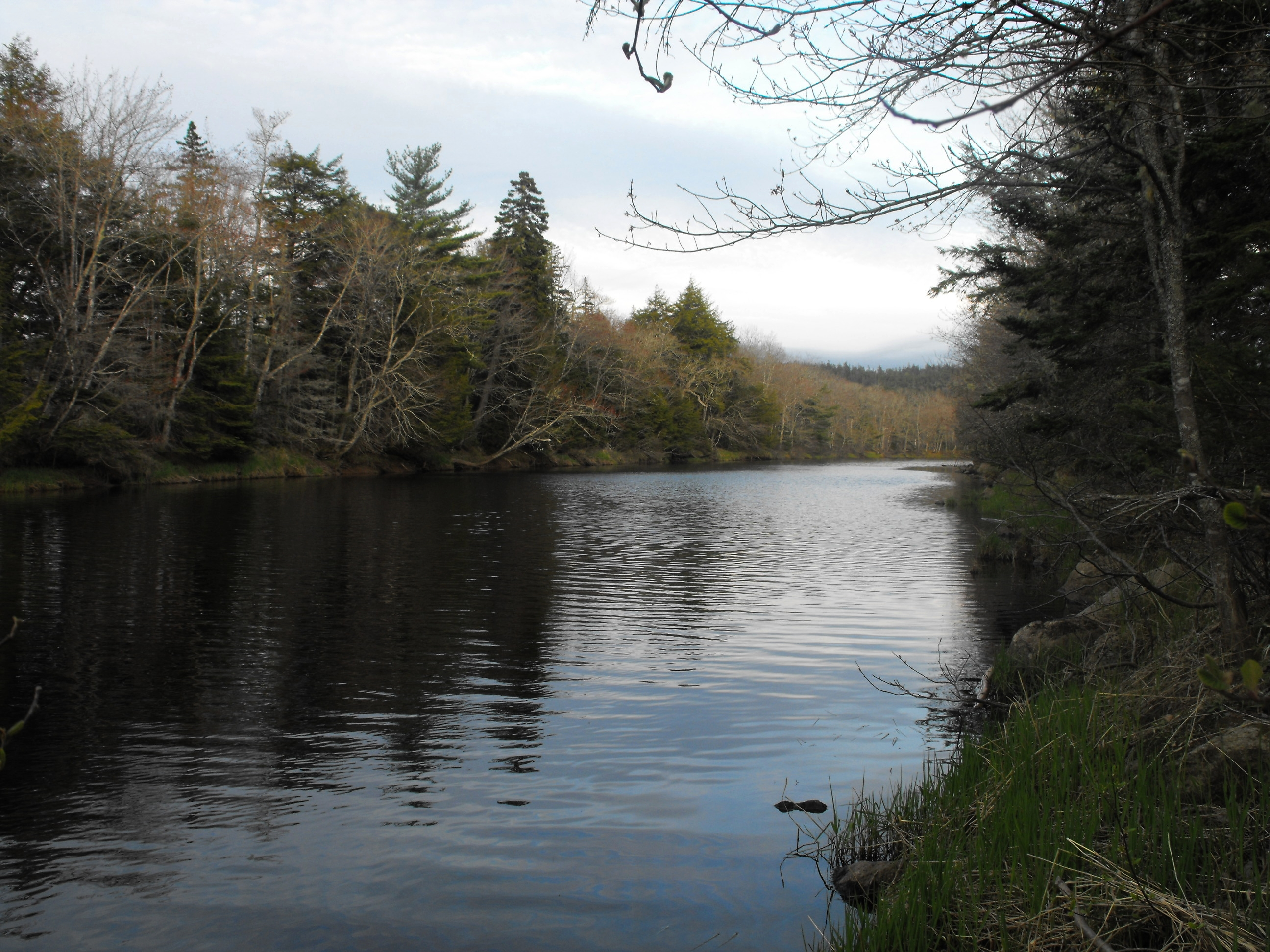
Musquodoboit River

The Musquodoboit Valley region is located within the northeastern reaches of the Halifax Regional Municipality. Entirely rural, the region shares more in common economically with the neighboring rural areas of adjacent Pictou and Colchester counties, as well as the nearby Eastern Shore region, as the economy of the valley relies on forestry and agriculture. The Musquodoboit River bisects the valley, the headwaters of which are at the confluence of the North and South branches of the Musquodoboit River. The drainage area of the river is 1,316 square kilometres (508 mi^{2}). The mouth of the river is at Musquodoboit Harbour, which in turn flows into the Atlantic Ocean.

== History ==
The name of the valley, as well as the name of several communities within it, is derived from the mi'kmaw word Mooskudoboogwek, meaning "suddenly widening out after a narrow entrance at its mouth". Musquodoboit is an Anglicized version of the native name. The area of present-day Musquodoboit Harbour was first settled by Europeans in the 1680s by the French. Claude Petitpas Jr. and his Mi'kmaq wife, Marie Therese, moved from Port Royal and the Annapolis Valley and raised their family near Martinique Beach, at the mouth of the river. The first land grants around Middle Musquodoboit were given in the 1780s, and the Mi'kmaw referred to the place as Natkamkik, meaning "the river extends uphill". The area was known as Laytonville until sometime after 1883. Gold mining was prevalent in the region in the 20th century, most notably in the community of Moose River Gold Mines. The community was the site of a cave-in disaster in 1936 which received national attention.

== Economy ==
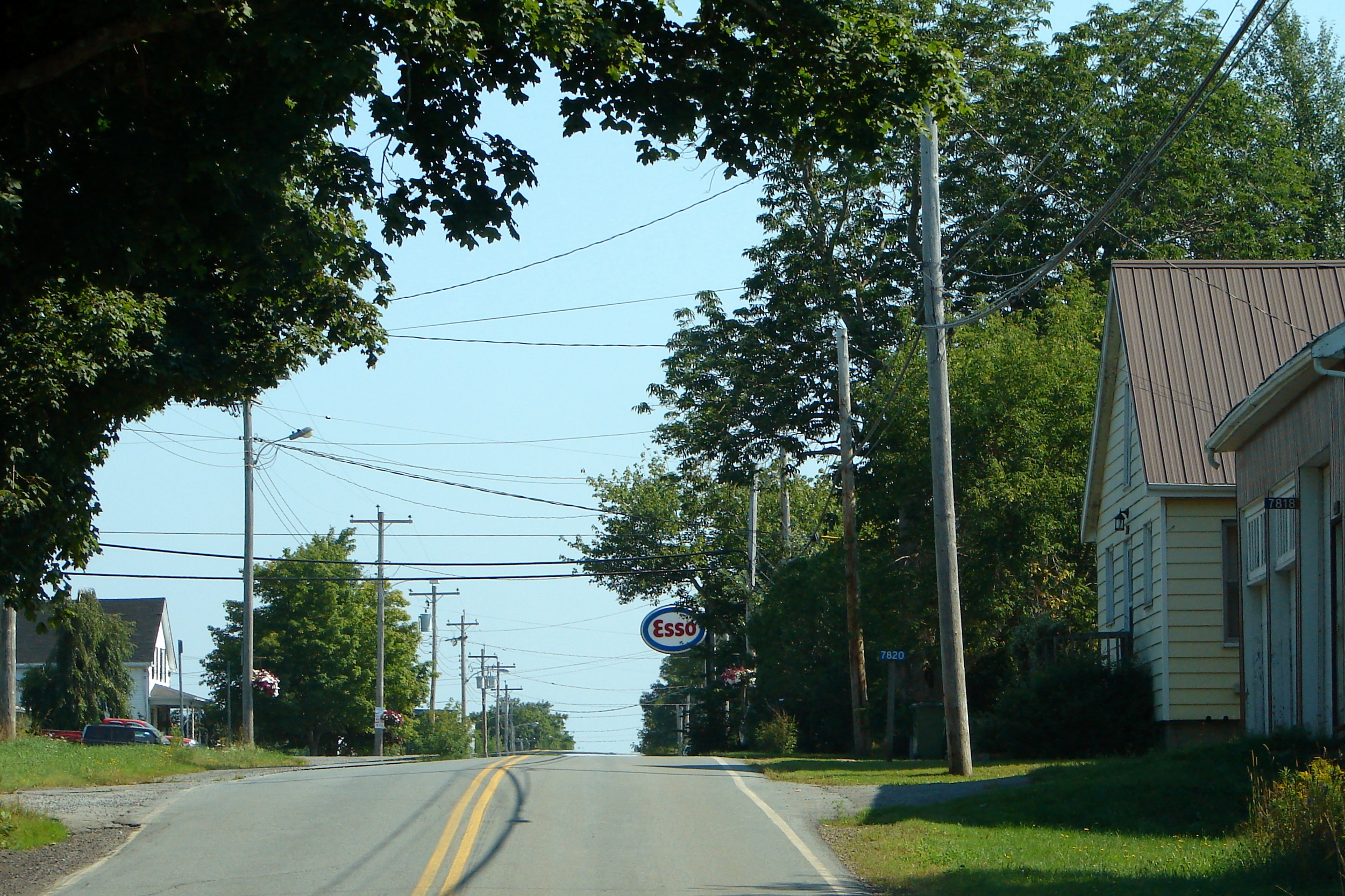
Middle Musquodoboit

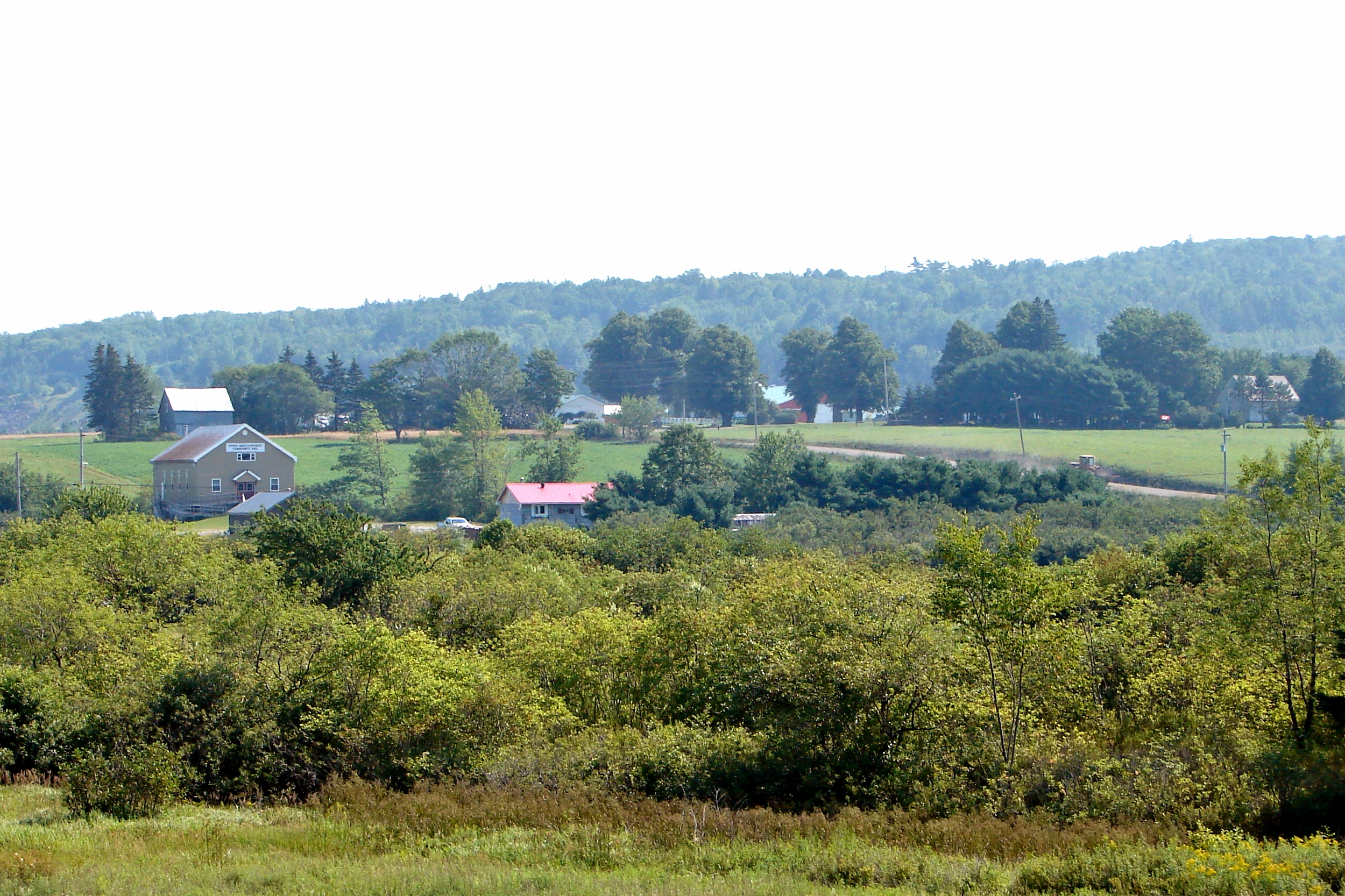
Upper Musquodoboit

The upper part of the Musquodoboit Valley comprises the largest farming district in the Halifax Regional Municipality. The farms have adapted over time from family-run farms to large commercial scale farms, to adapt to the changing market. Most of the non-farming businesses within the valley are concentrated in Upper Musquodoboit and Middle Musquodoboit.

Middle Musquodoboit had a Co-op store, which recently closed, as well as a bakery and restaurant. A fire station is present within the community, as well as a detachment of the Royal Canadian Mounted Police. The Natural Resources Education Centre is located within the community as well, offering cuuriculum-based programs as well as three kilometres (1.9 mi) of hiking trails. A federal post office and branch of the Royal Bank of Canada are in the community as well. Middle Musquodoboit also hosts the annual Halifax County Exhibition. Upper Musquodoboit has a convenience store, a volunteer fire station, an auto-body shop and a limestone mine.

Musquodoboit Valley Memorial Hospital is the only hospital in the Musquodoboit Valley. It is located in Middle Musquodoboit and is on the opposite side of the river to the downtown area. It is adjacent to Braeside Nursing Home.

=== Education ===
Three schools are present within the valley region.

Musquodoboit Rural High School (MRHS) is the only high school in the Musquodoboit Valley. It has Three feeder schools and teaches grades 7–12. Offering an Intensive French program, the building was constructed in 2008. In 2018, there were 270 students enrolled in the school. Musquodoboit Valley Education Centre (MVEC) is a feeder school of MRHS. Located in Middle Musquodoboit, the school teaches grades primary through six. The school was constructed in 2001 and had an enrollment of 113 in 2018.

Upper Musquodoboit Consolidated Elementary School is located in Upper Musquodoboit. The school is a feeder school of MRHS. Serving grades primary through six, the school was constructed in 1962. In 2018, there were thirty students enrolled in the school.

== Climate ==
Climate data for Middle Musquodoboit, 1981–2010 normals, extremes 1961–present
Month	Jan	Feb	Mar	Apr	May	Jun	Jul	Aug	Sep	Oct	Nov	Dec	Year
Record high °C (°F)	16.5 (61.7)	17.0 (62.6)	28.0 (82.4)	30.5 (86.9)	33.3 (91.9)	33.9 (93.0)	34.5 (94.1)	35.6 (96.1)	33.0 (91.4)	26.7 (80.1)	23.5 (74.3)	16.0 (60.8)	35.6 (96.1)
Mean daily maximum °C (°F)	−0.9 (30.4)	0.2 (32.4)	3.9 (39.0)	9.6 (49.3)	16.1 (61.0)	21.3 (70.3)	24.7 (76.5)	24.6 (76.3)	20.3 (68.5)	14.0 (57.2)	7.8 (46.0)	2.2 (36.0)	12.0 (53.6)
Daily mean °C (°F)	−6.2 (20.8)	−5.2 (22.6)	−1.3 (29.7)	4.4 (39.9)	9.9 (49.8)	14.8 (58.6)	18.5 (65.3)	18.4 (65.1)	14.2 (57.6)	8.5 (47.3)	3.5 (38.3)	−2.4 (27.7)	6.4 (43.5)
Mean daily minimum °C (°F)	−11.4 (11.5)	−10.6 (12.9)	−6.4 (20.5)	−0.9 (30.4)	3.7 (38.7)	8.3 (46.9)	12.2 (54.0)	12.2 (54.0)	7.9 (46.2)	2.9 (37.2)	−1.0 (30.2)	−7.1 (19.2)	0.8 (33.4)
Record low °C (°F)	−34.0 (−29.2)	−33.0 (−27.4)	−31.0 (−23.8)	−15.0 (5.0)	−7.8 (18.0)	−3.0 (26.6)	1.1 (34.0)	−1.5 (29.3)	−4.5 (23.9)	−10.6 (12.9)	−21.0 (−5.8)	−34.0 (−29.2)	−34.0 (−29.2)
Average precipitation mm (inches)	129.8 (5.11)	100.5 (3.96)	124.2 (4.89)	109.0 (4.29)	105.4 (4.15)	99.8 (3.93)	103.8 (4.09)	91.9 (3.62)	110.7 (4.36)	116.7 (4.59)	136.8 (5.39)	129.1 (5.08)	1,357.6 (53.45)
Average rainfall mm (inches)	80.4 (3.17)	62.1 (2.44)	92.8 (3.65)	99.5 (3.92)	104.9 (4.13)	99.8 (3.93)	103.8 (4.09)	91.9 (3.62)	110.7 (4.36)	116.7 (4.59)	128.6 (5.06)	97.2 (3.83)	1,188.3 (46.78)
Average snowfall cm (inches)	49.4 (19.4)	41.3 (16.3)	31.4 (12.4)	9.5 (3.7)	0.5 (0.2)	0.0 (0.0)	0.0 (0.0)	0.0 (0.0)	0.0 (0.0)	0.0 (0.0)	8.2 (3.2)	31.9 (12.6)	172.2 (67.8)
Average precipitation days (≥ 0.2 mm)	14.8	12.1	13.7	15.0	14.9	14.0	12.7	12.7	12.3	14.7	15.8	14.5	167.1
Average rainy days (≥ 0.2 mm)	7.5	6.0	9.4	14.0	14.8	14.0	12.7	12.7	12.3	14.7	14.8	10.1	143.1
Average snowy days (≥ 0.2 cm)	9.0	7.5	5.4	1.8	0.08	0.0	0.0	0.0	0.0	0.0	1.9	6.2	31.8
Source: Environment Canada
