= Beaver Lake 17 =

Mi'kmaq reserve on Nova Scotia

Coordinates: 45°1′20″N 62°45′50″W

Beaver Lake 17 in Nova Scotia

Beaver Lake 17 is a small Mi'kmaq reserve on the Eastern Shore of Nova Scotia, Canada, in the Halifax Regional Municipality. It is located on Route 224 about 21 km (13 mi) northwest of Sheet Harbour and about 20 km (12 mi) southeast of Upper Musquodoboit. The community is located adjacent to Lower Beaver Lake and is located within the community of Beaver Dam. It is adjacent to Lower Beaver Lake.
