= Beaver Dam, Nova Scotia =

Community in Nova Scotia, Canada

Coordinates: 45°01′15″N 62°45′45″W

Beaver Dam in Nova Scotia

Beaver Dam is a rural community on the Eastern Shore of Nova Scotia, Canada, in the Halifax Regional Municipality. It is located along Route 224, about 21 km (13 mi) northwest of Sheet Harbour and about 19 km (12 mi) southeast of Upper Musquodoboit. Beaver Lake 17, a small Mi'kmaq reserve, is located in the community as well. The community is located adjacent to Lower Beaver Lake.

== Lakes ==
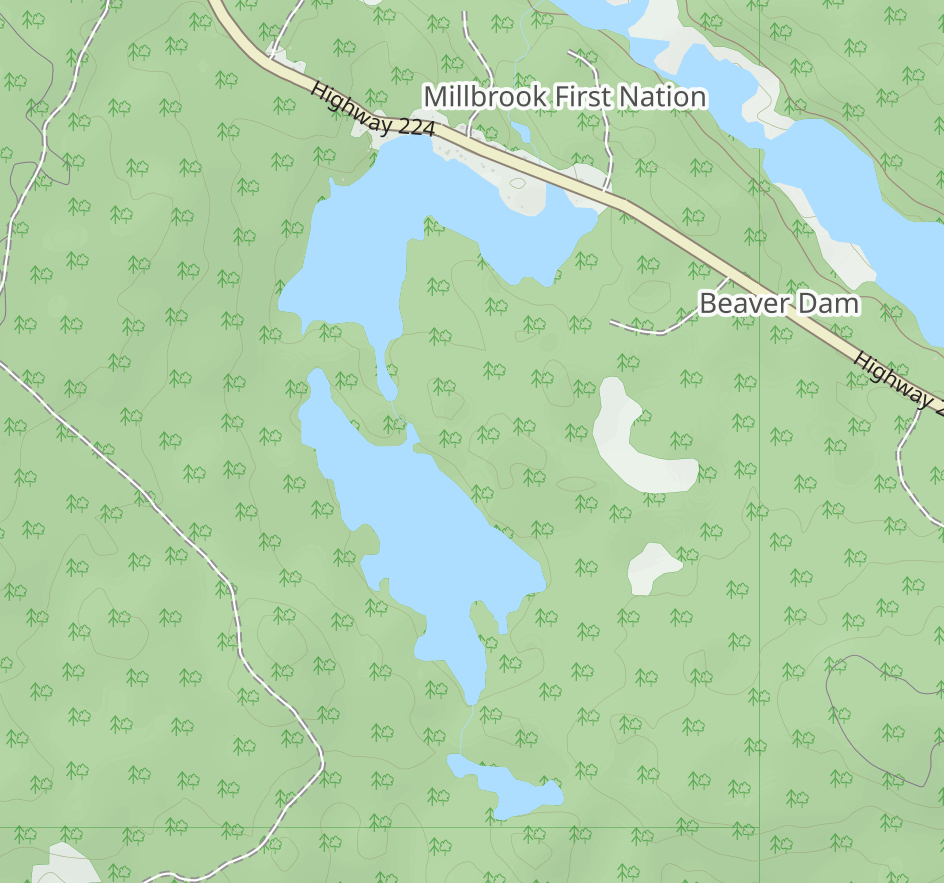
A map of Beaver Lake chain

=== Beaver Lake chain ===
The Beaver Lake chain is a chain of three freshwater glacial lakes located near Beaver Dam.

Lower Beaver Lake measures approximately 890 metres (2,920 ft) in length and 759 metres (2,490 ft) in width. It is connected to Middle Beaver Lake by a small stream. The lake is situated approximately 10 metres (33 ft) from Nova Scotia Route 224, providing direct roadside visibility and access.

Middle Beaver Lake is approximately 1,141 metres (3,743 ft) in length and 456 metres (1,496 ft) in width. As the name suggests, it is positioned between Upper Beaver Lake and Lower Beaver Lake.

Upper Beaver Lake is the smallest lake in the Beaver Lake chain. The lake’s widest point is 414 metres (1,358 ft), and the length of the lake is 171 metres (561 ft). It is connected to Middle Beaver Lake, and below Lake Alma.

== See also ==
- List of lakes of Nova Scotia
- Marinette, Nova Scotia
- River Lake, Nova Scotia
