= Nova Scotia Route 277 =

Highway in Nova Scotia, Canada

Route 277

Route information
- Maintained by Nova Scotia Department of Transportation and Infrastructure Renewal
- Length: 15 km (9.3 mi)

Major junctions
- West end: Trunk 2 in Lantz
- East end: Route 224 in Gays River

Location
- Country: Canada
- Province: Nova Scotia
- Counties: Halifax Regional Municipality

Highway system
- Provincial highways in Nova Scotia; 100-series
← Route 276	→ Route 289

Route 277 is an east-west collector road in the Canadian province of Nova Scotia.

It is located in the central part of the province and runs from Lantz at Trunk 2 to Gays River at Route 224. It is south of Shubenacadie and Milford and lightly used. Its 15 kilometer long route is paved entirely in asphalt.

== Route ==
Route 277 begins in the small municipality of Lantz, 3 kilometers northeast of Elmsdale. The route travels northeast for 15 kilometers bearing only a few turns. It finishes at Gays River, on Route 224.

== Communities ==
- Lantz
- Dutch Settlement
- Carrolls Corner
- Gays River

== See also ==
- List of Nova Scotia provincial highways

== Sources ==
- MapArt (2008). Canada back road atlas / atlas des rangs et chemins. Oshawa, Ontario: MapArt Publishing. ISBN 978-1-55368-614-9.
