= Dollar Lake (Nova Scotia) =

Lake in Nova Scotia

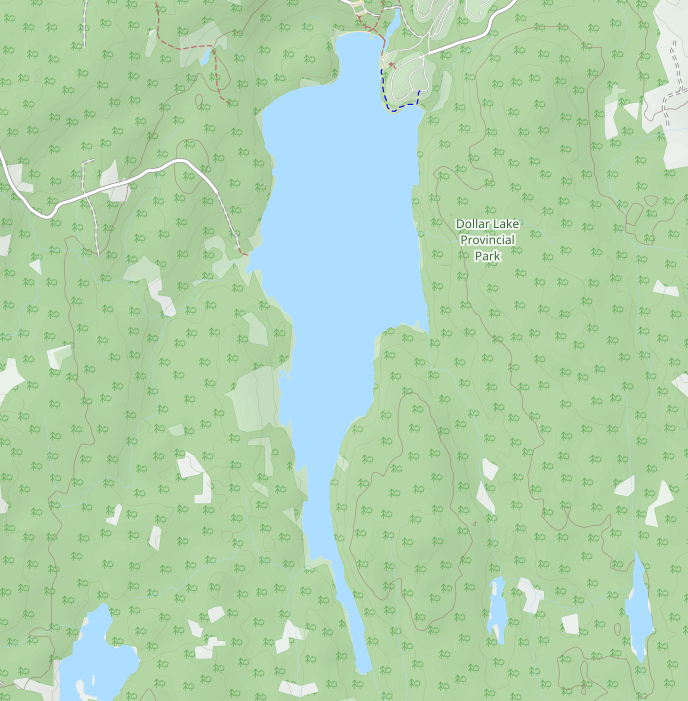
- Map of Dollar Lake
- Interactive map of Dollar Lake
- Location: Halifax County
- Coordinates: 44°55′0″N 63°19′26″W
- Type: Glacial
- Max. length: 4,302.5 metres (14,116 ft)
- Max. width: 1,011.8 metres (3,320 ft)

Dollar Lake is a glacial lake within Dollar Lake Provincial Park in Halifax County, Nova Scotia, Canada. It has an associated beach and brook named Dollar Lake Beach and Dollar Lake Brook. The lake is connected to Christopher Lake, Eastern Run Deadwaters, and McCullogh Lake by a small stream. Dollar Lake approximately 35.4 kilometres (22.0 mi) from Halifax and 50 kilometres (31 mi) from Truro. The lake was named in October 14, 1921.

== Etymology ==
Dollar Lake derives its name from a local account regarding the acquisition of the surrounding land by the province of Nova Scotia. According to this account, the property, formerly the site of a horse farm, was sold to the provincial government for a nominal sum of $1.

== Geography ==
Dollar Lake is measured approximately 4,302.5 metres (14,116 ft) in length and 1,011.8 metres (3,320 ft) in width. Nearby lakes around Dollar Lake include Ledwidge Lake, Otter Lake, Buckley Lake, Rocky Lake, and Graham Lake. It is mostly surrounded by wooded forests and wetlands.

== Routes ==
The lake is accessed via Nova Scotia Route 212, also known as Old Guysborough Road, followed by an unnamed park access road branching south from the highway that provides entry to the provincial park and the lake.

== See also ==
- List of lakes of Nova Scotia
- Musquodoboit River
- Paces Lake
