= Dollar Lake Provincial Park =

Provincial park in Nova Scotia, Canada

Coordinates: 44°55′49″N 63°19′7″W

Location of Dollar Lake Provincial Park

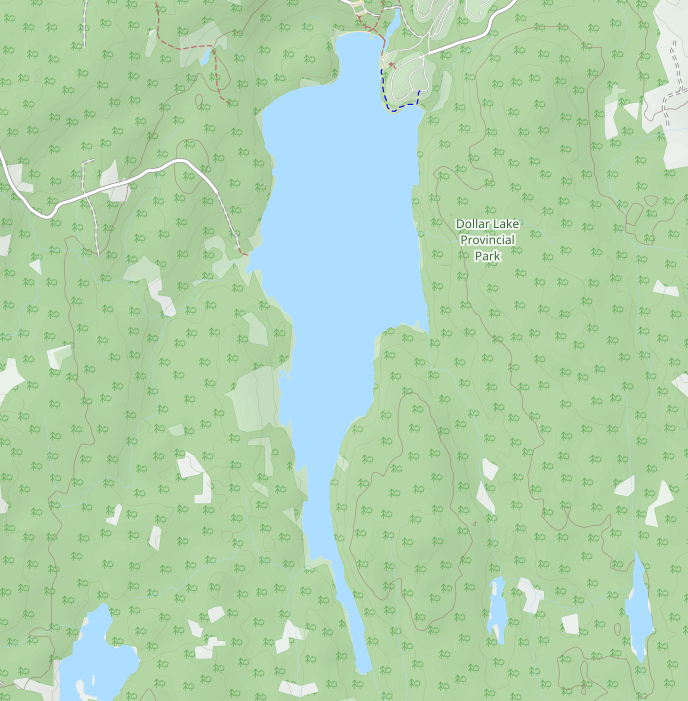
Map of Dollar Lake

Dollar Lake Provincial Park is a seasonal provincial park located in the Musquodoboit Valley area of the Halifax Regional Municipality in Nova Scotia, Canada, in the community of Wyses Corner, 22 kilometres from the Halifax International Airport on the Old Guysborough Road (Route 212).

Dollar Lake takes its name from the story behind Nova Scotia's acquisition of the property. A horse farm was once located on the grounds; the owner sold his assets to the province for only $1.00.

The park opens each year on the Victoria Day long weekend. The campgrounds close after the Labour Day weekend, while the beach remains open until October 9. The park contains both RV and tent campsites, plus a swimming beach. The beach is supervised during peak season. The park also offers a picnic area, playground, and boat launch.
