= Pine Grove, Nova Scotia =

Pine Grove, Nova Scotia could be the following places:

- Pine Grove, Colchester, Nova Scotia in Colchester County
- Pine Grove, Lunenburg, Nova Scotia in Lunenburg County
