= Nova Scotia Route 224 =

Highway in Nova Scotia, Canada

Route 224

Route information
- Maintained by Nova Scotia Department of Transportation and Infrastructure Renewal
- Length: 96 km (60 mi)

Major junctions
- West end: Hwy 102 / Trunk 14 in Milford Station
- Trunk 2 in Shubenacadie; Route 277 in Gays River; Route 357 in Middle Musquodoboit; Route 336 in Upper Musquodoboit
- East end: Trunk 7 in Sheet Harbour

Location
- Country: Canada
- Province: Nova Scotia
- Counties: Halifax Regional Municipality, Colchester, East Hants/Hants

Highway system
- Provincial highways in Nova Scotia; 100-series
← Route 223	→ Route 236

Route 224 is a collector road in the Canadian province of Nova Scotia. It is located in the Halifax Regional Municipality and Colchester County, connecting Sheet Harbour at Trunk 7 with Milford Station at Exit 9 of Highway 102 and Trunk 14. The route passes through the upper half of the Musquodoboit Valley.

== Route description ==
The route begins at Exit 9 of Highway 102 in Milford Station in East Hants and runs north to Shubenacadie, where Route 224 was Triplexed with Trunk 2 and the original Highway 102 for a short time. The route crosses the Shubenacadie River and enters Colchester County, then turns right and runs south through Pine Grove, to Gays River, where it meets Route 277. The route turns southeast, then enters the Halifax Regional Municipality.

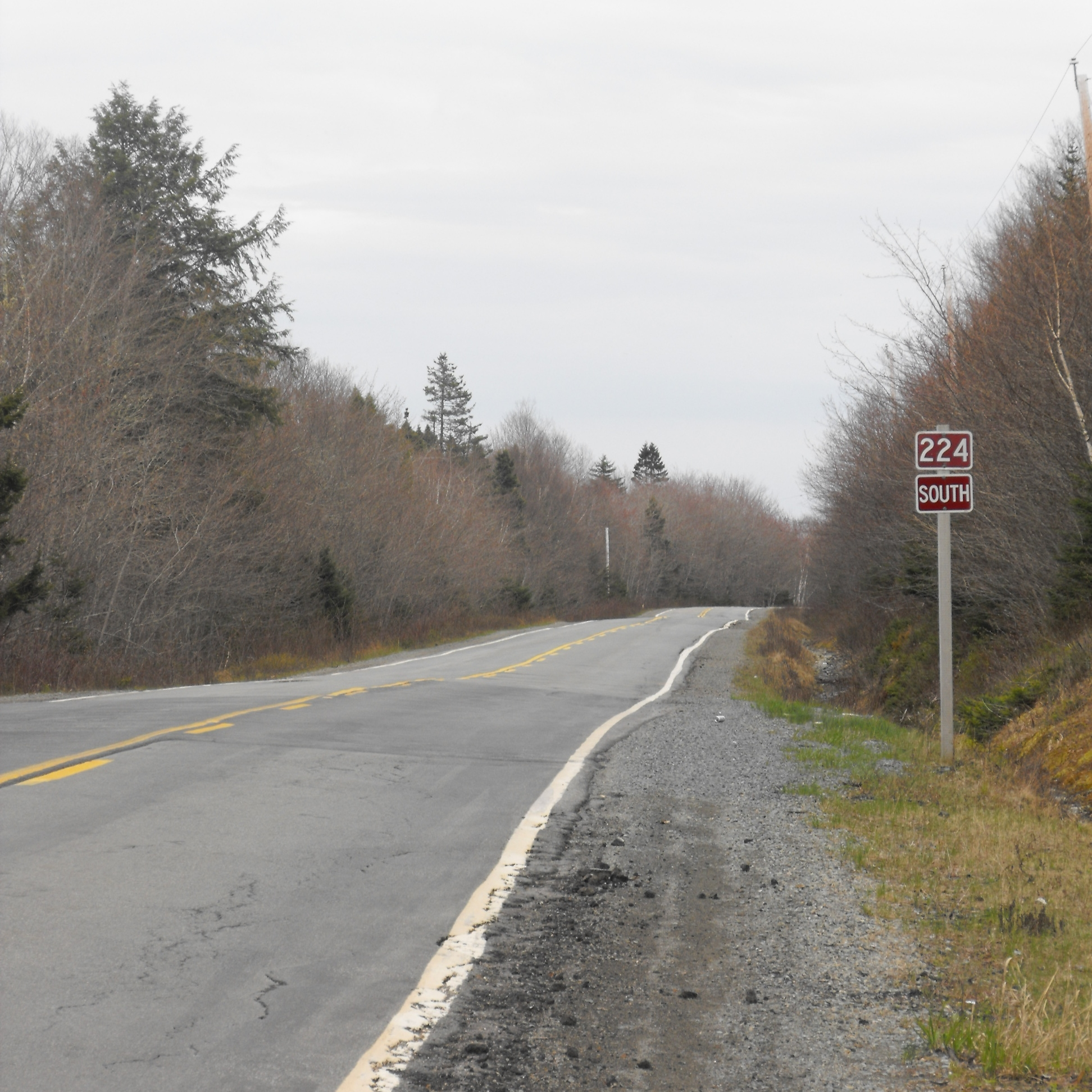
Nova Scotia Route 224 near Sheet Harbour

Route 224 passes through Cooks Brook and Chaswood, to Middle Musquodoboit, where it meets Route 357. The route turns left and runs through the northeastern part of the Musquodoboit Valley, passing through Centre Musquodoboit and Elmsvale. The route passes by the Musquodoboit Valley Provincial park in Middle Musquodoboit. In Upper Musquodoboit, the route meets Route 336 and turns south, where it begins to ascend the southern slope of the Musquodoboit Valley. The route then heads southeast toward the Eastern Shore, passing through Beaver Dam and Marinette then on to its eastern terminus in Sheet Harbour, for a distance of

96 km (60 mi).

Route 224 was originally named Trunk 24.

== Communities ==
- Milford Station
- Shubenacadie
- Pine Grove
- Gays River
- Cooks Brook
- Chaswood
- Middle Musquodoboit
- Centre Musquodoboit
- Elmsvale
- Greenwood
- Upper Musquodoboit
- Sheet Harbour Road
- Beaver Dam
- Marinette
- Sheet Harbour

== See also ==
- List of Nova Scotia provincial highways
