= Musquodoboit Harbour, Nova Scotia =

Musquodoboit Harbour
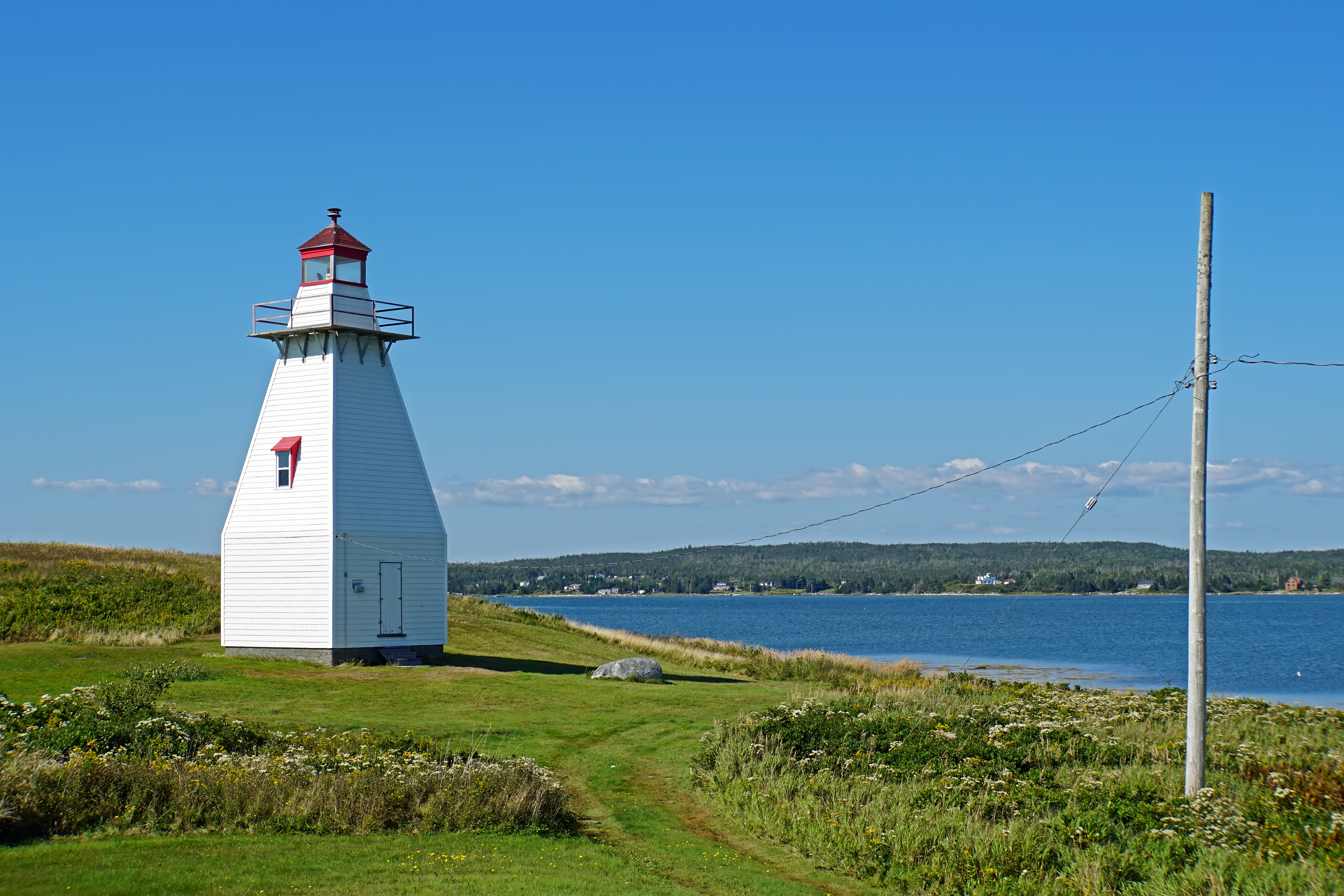
- Musquodoboit Harbour Lighthouse

- Location in Nova Scotia
- Coordinates: 44°47′14″N 63°8′55″W
- Country: Canada
- Province: Nova Scotia
- County: Halifax County

Population
  - Total: 2,139
- Postal code: 902

Musquodoboit Harbour is a rural community located in Nova Scotia, Canada within the Halifax Regional Municipality. The community is situated on the Eastern Shore at the mouth of the Musquodoboit River. The community lies 45 kilometres east of downtown Halifax. With a hospital, RCMP detachment, postal outlet, schools, recreational center, library, municipal office and other services, Musquodoboit Harbour is a serve centre for many of the surrounding communities.

== Etymology ==
Musquodoboit means foaming to the sea, flowing out square or rolling out in foam, or suddenly widening out after a narrow entrance at its mouth. The community is an anglicized version of the Mi’kmaq word Moosekudoboogwek or Muskoodeboogwek.

== History ==
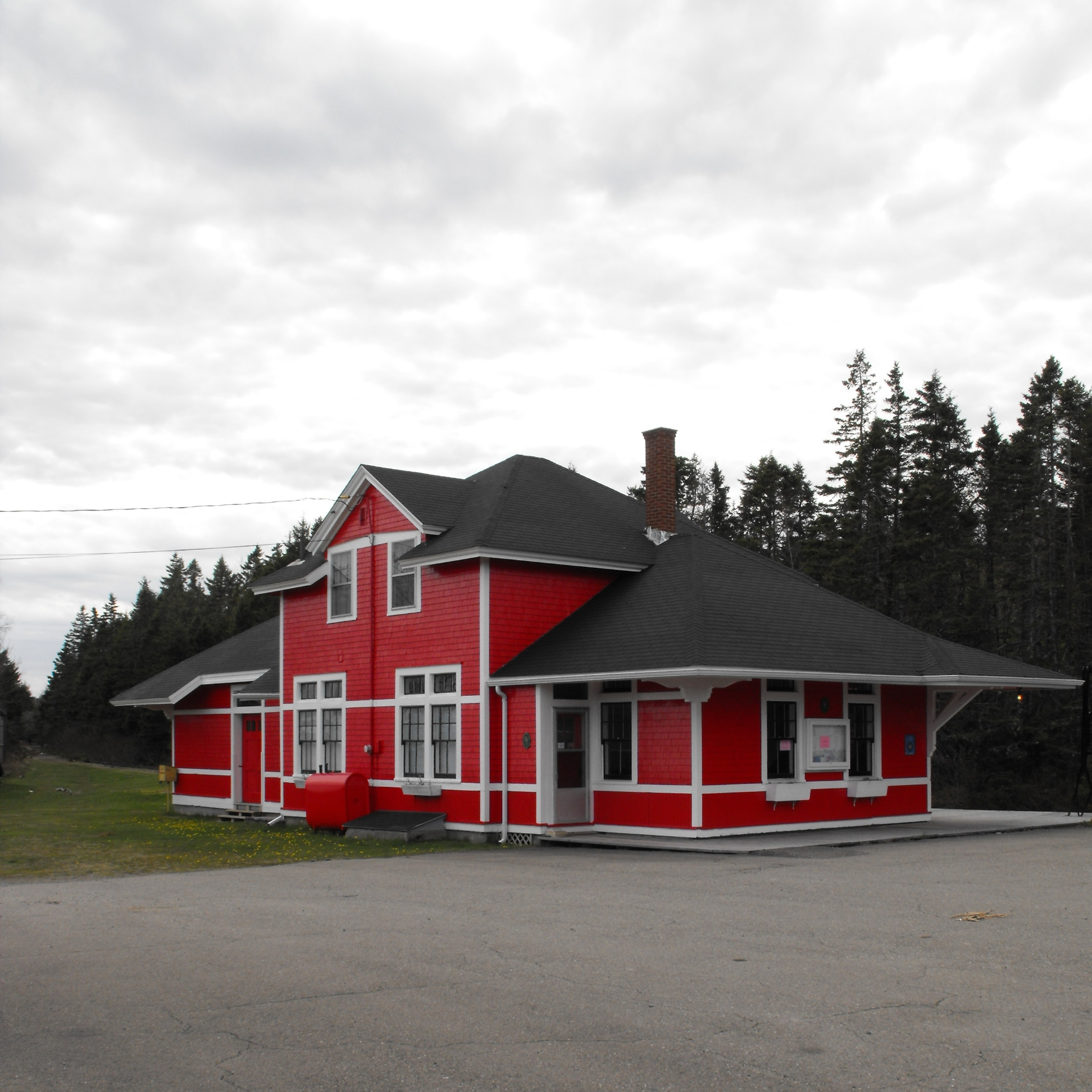
The local railway station is now a museum.

The community was settled in the 1780s mainly by Loyalists. Through the late 18th and early 19th centuries many settlers from Scotland, England and Germany immigrated to the area and they still have descendants in the area; this is excemplified by prominent family names such as Tibbo, Rowlings, Anderson, Gaetz, and Bayers.

=== Transportation history ===
Much early travel was by water as roads were rough. Beginning in 1852, the stage coach travelled from Musquodoboit Harbour to Dartmouth at a cost of 5 shillings. The first automobile was owned by Dr. Kennedy in 1909. The Dartmouth Eastern Railway commenced in 1912 to carry lumber and lime from Middle Musquodoboit to Dartmouth. The train station was completed in 1918 and today houses the Musquodoboit Harbour Railway Museum, which also serves as the local tourism office in summer. The museum grounds contain a passenger car, snow plow from the Dominion Atlantic Railway and a caboose from the Canadian National Railway. The museum is on the Canadian Register of Historic Places. Today, the former railbed has been converted into a rail trail, which starts at the former railway station and parallels the river, running 15 km north-northwestwards to Gibraltar. Several hiking trails branch off the main trail into the granite uplands, named the Bayers Lake Loop, Admiral Lake Loop, North Granite Ridge, and South Granite Ridge trails. Motorized vehicles are not permitted to use the trail; they must use Highway 357, which runs generally parallel to the trail.

=== Other services ===
The Rural Telephone system came into use around 1909. Not much is known about this company but the area was controlled by the Maritime Telegraph and Telephone Company by the late 1990s.

In 1996, Halifax, Dartmouth, Bedford, and the County of Halifax amalgamated into what is today the Halifax Regional Municipality. Dozens of fire departments merged into the Halifax Regional Fire & Emergency Services, and the Musquodoboit Harbour Volunteer Fire Department received the designation of "Halifax Regional Fire and Emergency, Station 24." On June 13, 2008, The station was actively involved in the Porter's Lake fire, one of the biggest forest fire in Nova Scotia's history. Members spent 5 days working side-by-side with the Department of Natural Resources. On October 6, 2008, the station was staffed with career personnel for the first time. From October 6, 2008 to December 31, 2008, the crew was made up of a career Lieutenant and a casual worker taken from the station's own volunteers. On January 1, 2009, the station was officially staffed with career personnel, Monday to Friday, with anywhere between 2 and 4 people, depending on the needs.

== Martinique Beach Provincial Park ==
Located at the end of the East Petpeswick Road, Martinique Beach is the longest sandy beach in Nova Scotia. This 5 kilometre long beach is a provincial park which boasts both picnic and swimming facilities. The excellent surf conditions at Martinique Beach draw in surfers from all over. The beach is named after Prince Edward who took part in the 1794 Capture of Martinique.

There is a wildlife sanctuary adjacent to Martinique Beach. Canada geese and black ducks can often be seen during migratory periods. There is a protected nesting area for the Piping Plover, an endangered species.The site is an Important Bird Area.

== Healthcare ==
The Twin Oaks Memorial Hospital, which opened in 1976, is located on Highway 7. It has a 24-hour emergency department and provides a variety of outpatient and inpatient services.

== Transportation ==
=== Roads ===
- Trunk 7
- Highway 107
- Route 357
- East Petpeswick Road
- West Petpeswick Road

=== Greenways ===
- Musquodoboit Trailway

== Communications ==
- The postal Code is B0J 2L0.
- The Telephone exchange is 902 889, 891 - Bell Aliant; 342 - Eastlink; 878 - Rogers

== Demographics ==
- Total Population - 977
- Total Dwellings - 1364
- Total Land Area - 207.042 km^{2}

== Schools ==
- Eastern Shore District High School (10 to 12; closed)
- Oyster Pond Academy (P-9)
