= Higginsville, Nova Scotia =

Higginsville
- Location of Newcomb Corner in Nova Scotia
- Coordinates: 45°4′14″N 63°2′52″W
- Country: Canada
- Province: Nova Scotia
- Administrative district: Halifax Regional Municipality
- Elevation: 10 m (33 ft)
- Highest elevation: 64 m (210 ft)
- Lowest elevation: 0 m (0 ft)
- Time zone: UTC−4 (ATS)
  - Summer (DST): UTC−3 (Atlantic Daylight Saving Time)
- Postal code: B0N 1X0
- Area code: 902
- Highways: Route 224

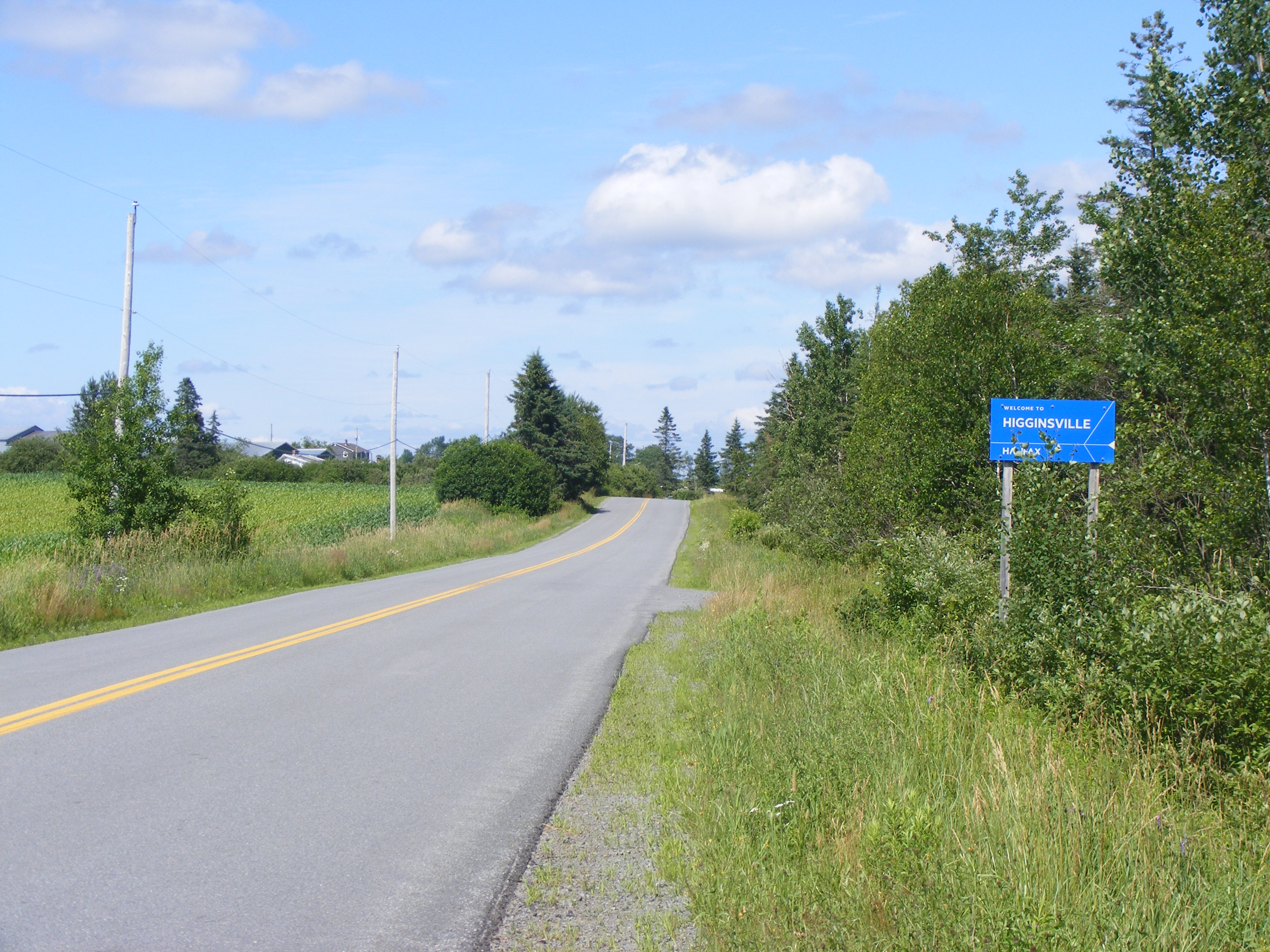
Higginsville, July 2023.

Higginsville is a rural community of the Halifax Regional Municipality in the Canadian province of Nova Scotia. The area was settled in 1783 by John Higgins and his wife Hester Carmichael. John was from Wiltshire, England and served with the British Army in the 70th Regiment of Foot as a Genadiere in the American Revolutionary War, and subsequently granted 60 acres of land in Shelburne (Port Roseway), Nova Scotia. The land in Port Roseway was very rocky and not fit for farming; he and his wife traveled along the coast until they came to the Musquodoboit River which they followed inland. Hester was pregnant and when they reached the area now known as Higginsville, they spent the night and their first child was born. John and Hester found the area to be good for farming and remained there to raise their family.
