= Gibraltar Rock (disambiguation) =

Gibraltar Rock usually refers to the Rock of Gibraltar, a promontory on the south of the Iberian Peninsula.

Gibraltar Rock can also refer to:

- Gibraltar rock (candy), a type of candy associated with Salem, Massachusetts
- Gibraltar Rock Provincial Park Reserve, a park in Nova Scotia, Canada
- Gibraltar Rock State Natural Area, a protected area in Wisconsin
- Gibraltar Rock (Western Australia), a granite outcrop in south-western Australia
