= Lake Egmont, Nova Scotia =

Community in Nova Scotia, Canada

Coordinates: 44°58′34″N 63°18′35″W

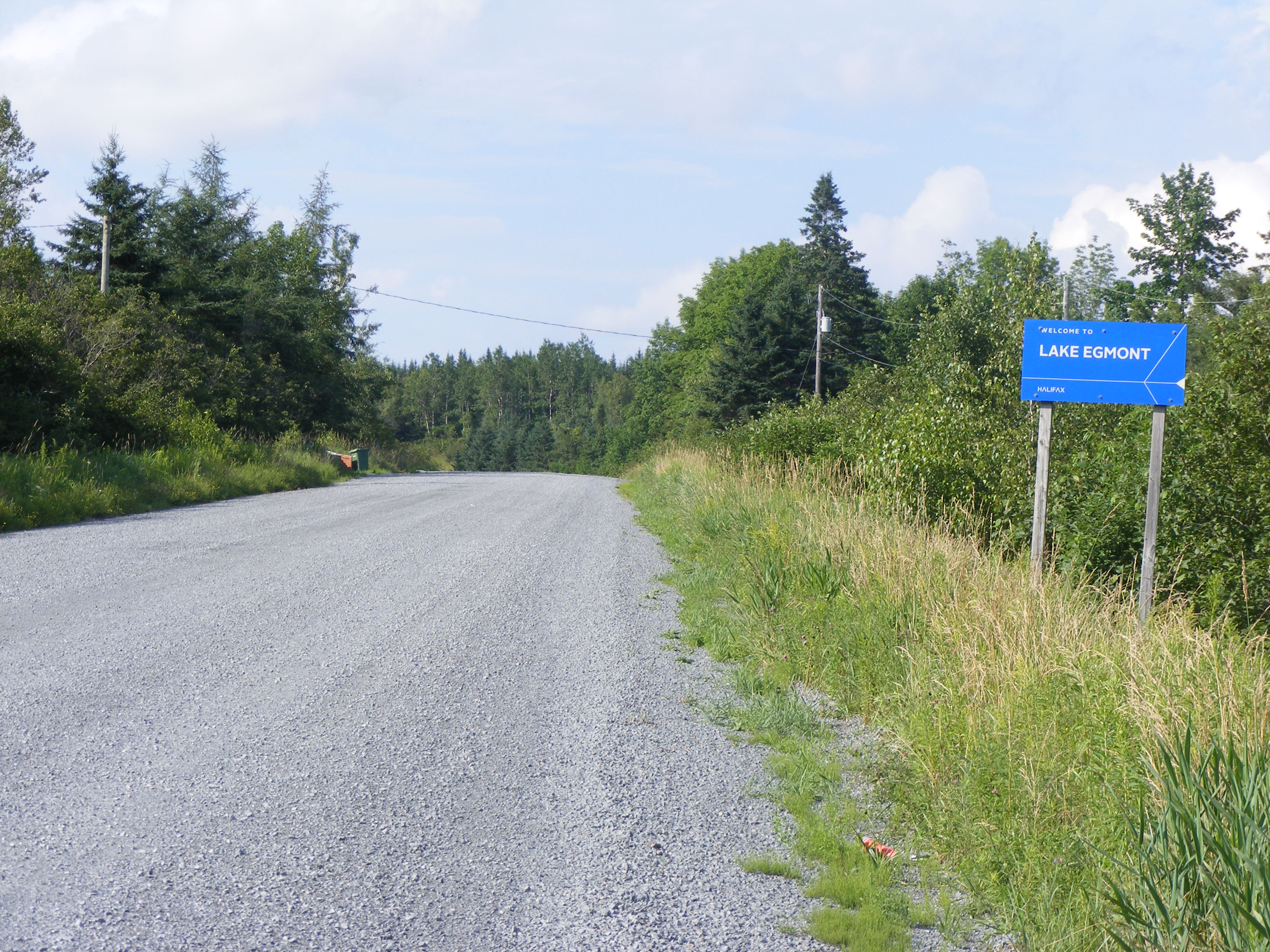
Lake Egmont, July 2023.

Lake Egmont in Nova Scotia

Lake Egmont is a small rural community in the lower interior of the Musquodoboit Valley, in the Halifax Regional Municipality of Nova Scotia, Canada. Other communities in this area include Antrim and Wyses Corner, Nova Scotia. The community was named after John Perceval, 2nd Earl of Egmont.

== Geography ==
Lake Egmont is in the interior of the Musquodoboit Valley. The area is extremely hilly and forested. The most common tree found is the Maple and Spruce. The community is dotted with small homes and farms.
