= Mactara =

Canadian primary forest products producer

MacTara Limited was a Canadian producer of primary forest products based in Upper Musquodoboit, Nova Scotia.

The company operated the largest sawmill in the province and was established in 1968. Annual production averaged approximately 130 million board feet (310,000 m^{3}) of finished, kiln-dried lumber annually, as well as 85,000 metric tonnes of wood pellets. It had approximately 200 employees and was a major employer in the Musquodoboit Valley.

In 2007 Mactara laid off 95 of its 150 employees and entered receivership. In 2008, its assets were purchased by the German company Enligna, which formed Enligna Canada from the old MacTara. Enligna Canada entered receivership in 2011. | Its assets were bought by Vancouver-based Viridis Energy in 2012, which formed Scotia Atlantic Biomass Company on the site. Scotia Atlantic Biomass Company then went bankrupt in 2017.
