= Russ Hatton =

Canadian Anglican bishop

George Russell (Ron) Hatton (1932–2012) was a suffragan bishop in the Nova Scotia and Prince Edward Island, Canada.

Hatton was educated at the University of King's College. After a curacy at All Saints Cathedral, Halifax he was the chaplain at Dalhousie University. He was the incumbent at Lantz then the director of the University Episcopal Centre, Minneapolis. He was the National Affairs Officer for the Anglican Church of Canada from 1972 to 1977 then President of the Atlantic School of Theology, Halifax.

He died on 14 January 2012.
