= Lake Alma (Nova Scotia) =

Lake in Nova Scotia, Canada

Lake Alma, Nova Scotia
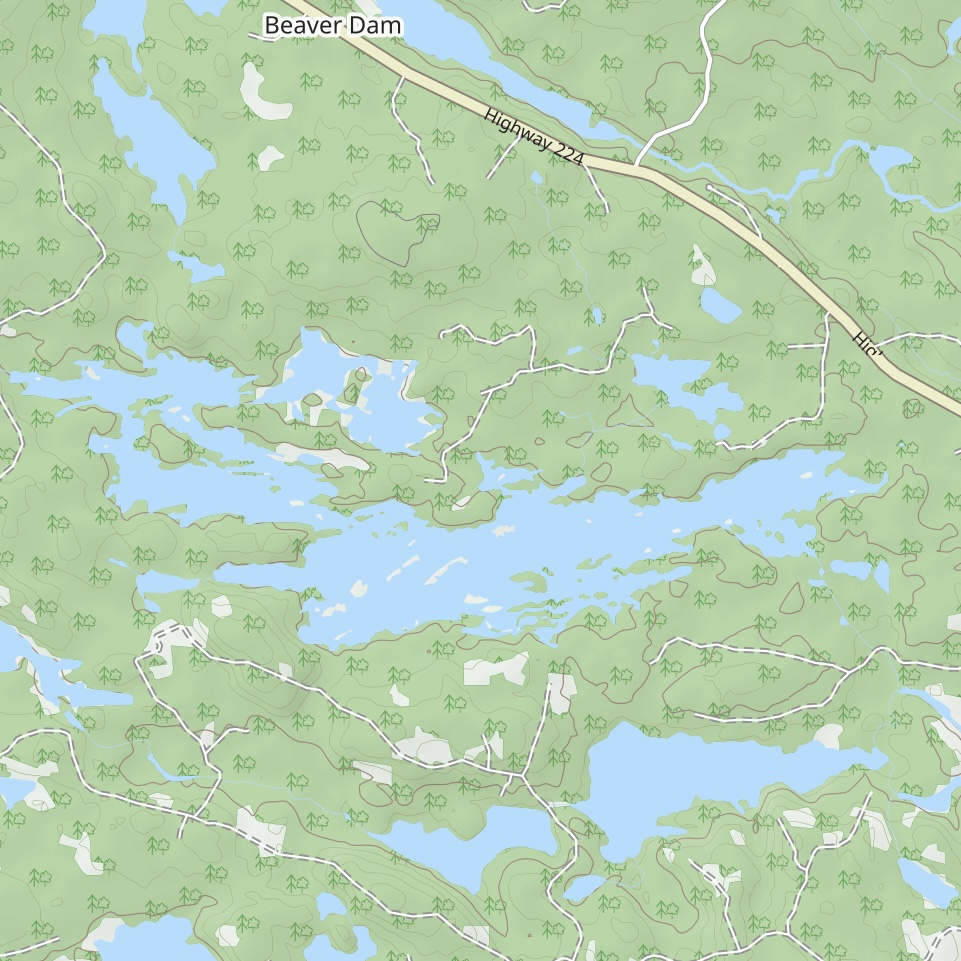
- Interactive map of Lake Alma, Nova Scotia
- Location: Halifax, Nova Scotia
- Coordinates: 44.983831°N 62.730719°W
- Basin countries: Canada

Lake Alma is a lake in Nova Scotia, Canada. The lake is 77.33 kilometres (48.05 mi) from Halifax, and 61.42 kilometres (38.16 mi) from Truro.

== Geography ==
Near lakes around Lake Alma include Spectacle Lake, Grassy Lake, Blackie Lake, and Curry Lake. The lake's length is 4.61 kilometres (2.86 mi), and the width is 1.26 kilometres (0.78 mi). The lake is generally around 100 metres (330 ft) and contains numerous islands, although none of them are officially named.

== Routes ==
Lake Alma is be accessible via Nova Scotia Route 224 near Beaver Dam, as the highway passes directly besides it.

== See also ==
- List of lakes of Nova Scotia
- Scraggy Lake
- Upper Beaver Lake
