= Dutch Settlement, Nova Scotia =

Community in Nova Scotia, Canada

Coordinates: 44°59′27″N 63°26′30″W

Dutch Settlement in Nova Scotia

Dutch Settlement is a community in the Canadian province of Nova Scotia, located in the Halifax Regional Municipality.

Situated in the Shubenacadie Valley, Dutch Settlement is part of the Halifax Regional Municipality and is serviced by Route 277.

It was originally called Keyes or Keysfield after William Keys (Keyes) in 1786. The present name is a tribute to the number of German immigrants who moved to the area. The word "Dutch" is an anglicized version of "Deutsch".

The community is immediately adjacent to the communities of Carrolls Corner and Lantz.
