= Sheet Harbour Road, Nova Scotia =

Community in Nova Scotia, Canada

Coordinates: 45°07′08″N 62°53′47″W

Sheet Harbour Road in Nova Scotia

Sheet Harbour Road is a community of the Halifax Regional Municipality in the Canadian province of Nova Scotia. It is located just five minutes south of Upper Musquodoboit, Nova Scotia. Its name is derived from Route 224, which is the primary route from the Musquodoboit Valley to Sheet Harbour, Nova Scotia.
