= Nova Scotia Route 212 =

Highway in Nova Scotia, Canada

Route 212
- Old Guysborough Road

Route information
- Maintained by Nova Scotia Department of Transportation and Infrastructure Renewal
- Length: 31 km (19 mi)

Major junctions
- West end: Hwy 102 in Enfield
- East end: Route 357 in Elderbank

Location
- Country: Canada
- Province: Nova Scotia

Highway system
- Provincial highways in Nova Scotia; 100-series
← Route 211	→ Route 213

Route 212 is an east-west collector road in the south of the Canadian province of Nova Scotia.

It is located in the Halifax Regional Municipality and connects Enfield at Exit 5 on Highway 102 with Route 357 at Elderbank in the Musquodoboit Valley. It goes across both forest and farmland and is paved for its entire length.

The route is known as the "Old Guysborough Road" as it was the colonial military road from Halifax to Guysborough.

== Route ==
Route 212 begins at exit 5A, of Highway 102, which connects Halifax to Truro. It begins by following the south border of the Halifax Stanfield International Airport, where it afterwards turns northeast to meet with Devon and Dollar Lake Provincial Park. The route terminates about 7 kilometers farther, on Route 357, at Elderbank.

== Communities ==
- Enfield
- Halifax Stanfield International Airport
- Goffs
- Devon
- Wyses Corner
- Elderbank

== Parks ==
- Dollar Lake Provincial Park
- Elderbank Provincial Park

== See also ==
- List of Nova Scotia provincial highways

== Sources ==
- MapArt (2008). Canada back road atlas / atlas des rangs et chemins. Oshawa, Ontario: MapArt Publishing. ISBN 978-1-55368-614-9.
