= Greenwood, Halifax County, Nova Scotia =

Community in Nova Scotia, Canada

Coordinates: 45°7′43.1″N 63°0′40.8″W

Greenwood in Nova Scotia

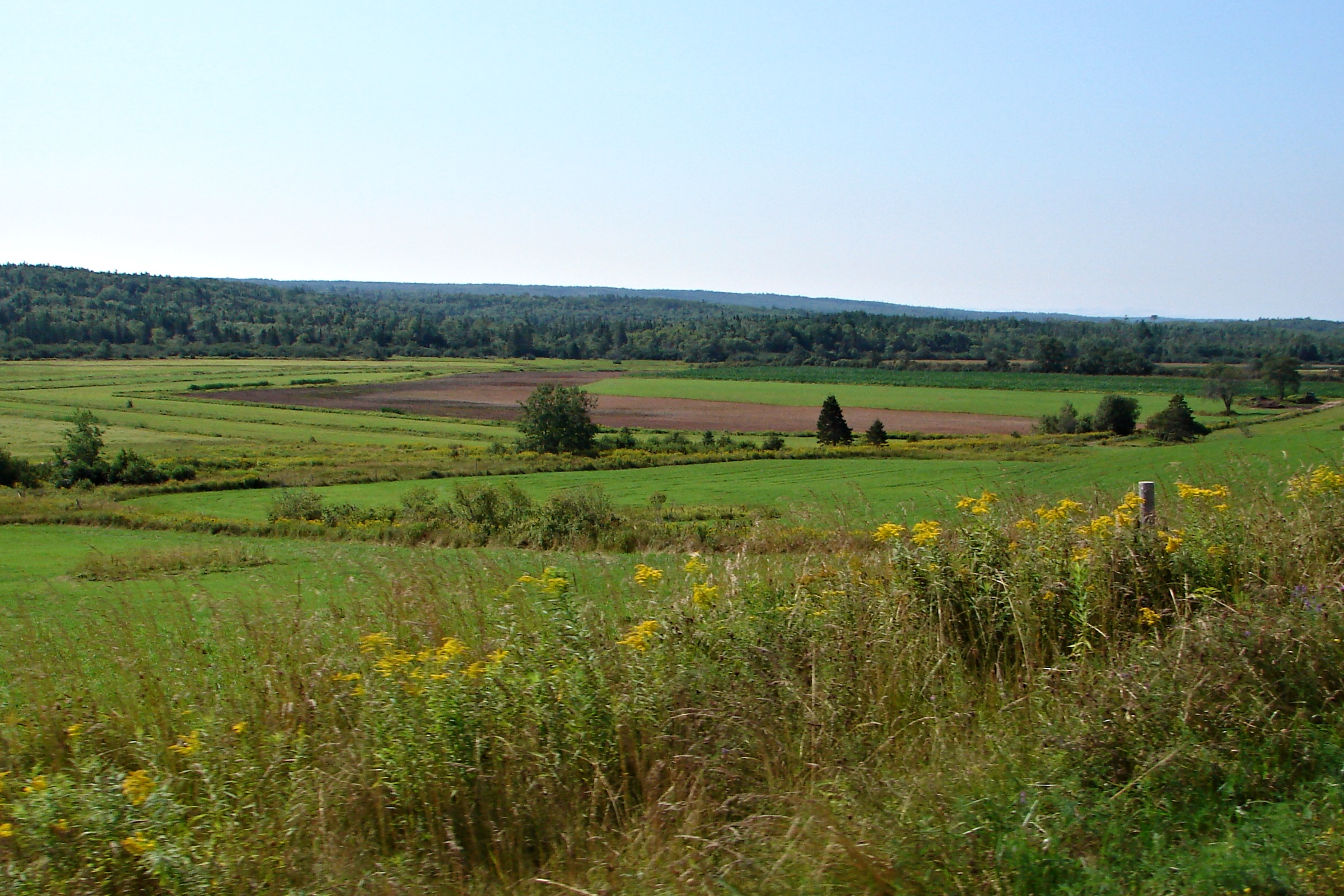
Musquodoboit Valley at Greenwood

Greenwood, Halifax County is a rural community of the Halifax Regional Municipality in the Canadian province of Nova Scotia. It is located along Route 224, in the Musquodoboit Valley.
