= Middle Musquodoboit, Nova Scotia =

Middle Musquodoboit
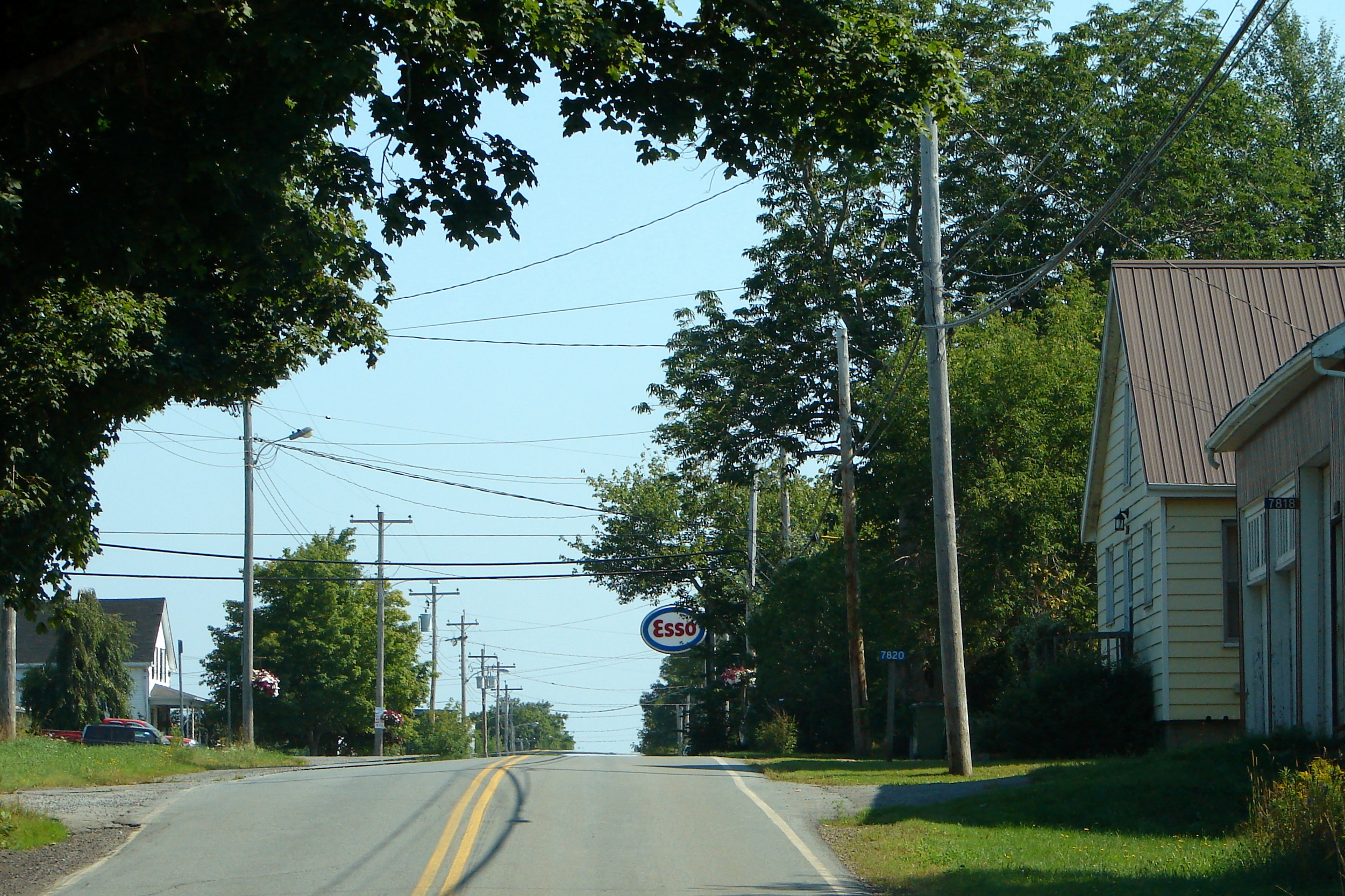
- Route 357 in Middle Musquodoboit

- Location within Nova Scotia
- Coordinates: 45°02′35″N 63°09′06″W
- Country: Canada
- Province: Nova Scotia
- Municipality: Halifax Regional Municipality

Government
  - Governing Council: Halifax Regional Council
  - Community Council: Marine Drive Valley & Canal

Area
  - Total: 129.9 km^{2} (50.2 sq mi)

Population (2001)
  - Total: 669
- Canadian Postal code: B0N 1X0
- Area code: 902
- Telephone exchange: 384
- GNBC Code: CAZEY
- Total Dwellings: 260
- Highways: Route 224; Route 357
- Part of a series about Places in Nova Scotia

Middle Musquodoboit is a rural community in the Musquodoboit Valley region of Nova Scotia, Canada within the Halifax Regional Municipality, along the Musquodoboit River at the junction of Route 357 with Route 224, 78 kilometres (48 mi) from Dartmouth, Nova Scotia. The community's name comes from the First Nations' word Mooskoduboogwek, which means to suddenly widen out after a narrow entrance at a mouth. For a time after 1883, Middle Musquodoboit was called Laytonville, but at some point reverted to its former name.

== Amenities ==
There are numerous farms in the Middle Musquodoboit area. It, along with Upper Musquodoboit, are the major communities in the valley, being the two largest communities. Middle Musquodoboit has a bakery/restaurant called Reid's, which has operated in the town by its namesake family since the late 1800s and initially functioned as a general store for the community; a fire station, a police station, a natural resources station, and a post office. The annual Halifax County Exhibition is held the 3rd week of August in the community. There is a park along the Musquodoboit River 5 minutes outside Middle Musquodoboit, towards Upper Musquodoboit. Musquodoboit Valley Memorial Hospital (MVMH) is the only hospital in the Musquodoboit Valley. The facility is located on the opposite side of the Musquodoboit River. It is connected to Braeside Nursing Home, which is adjacent to the hospital.

Middle Musquodoboit boasts two schools: Musquodoboit Rural High School (MRHS) and Musquodoboit Valley Education Centre (MVEC).

MRHS is the only high school in the Musquodoboit Valley. It has two feeder schools, Musquodoboit Valley Education Centre and Upper Musquodoboit Consolidated School, located in Upper Musquodoboit. The school teaches grades seven through twelve. The school offers Intensive French. The school was constructed in 2008. As of 2017, there are 273 students enrolled in the school. Musquodoboit Valley Education Centre (MVEC) is a feeder school of MRHS. The school teaches grades primary through six. The school was constructed in 2001. As of 2017, there are 119 students enrolled in the school.

== Transportation ==
Middle Musquodoboit is located at the junction of Route 357 with Route 224. The roads in the area are a mix of both paved and unpaved roads.

== Climate ==
Climate data for Middle Musquodoboit, 1981–2010 normals, extremes 1961–present
Month	Jan	Feb	Mar	Apr	May	Jun	Jul	Aug	Sep	Oct	Nov	Dec	Year
Record high °C (°F)	16.5 (61.7)	17.0 (62.6)	28.0 (82.4)	30.5 (86.9)	33.3 (91.9)	33.9 (93.0)	34.5 (94.1)	35.6 (96.1)	33.0 (91.4)	26.7 (80.1)	23.5 (74.3)	16.0 (60.8)	35.6 (96.1)
Mean daily maximum °C (°F)	−0.9 (30.4)	0.2 (32.4)	3.9 (39.0)	9.6 (49.3)	16.1 (61.0)	21.3 (70.3)	24.7 (76.5)	24.6 (76.3)	20.3 (68.5)	14.0 (57.2)	7.8 (46.0)	2.2 (36.0)	12.0 (53.6)
Daily mean °C (°F)	−6.2 (20.8)	−5.2 (22.6)	−1.3 (29.7)	4.4 (39.9)	9.9 (49.8)	14.8 (58.6)	18.5 (65.3)	18.4 (65.1)	14.2 (57.6)	8.5 (47.3)	3.5 (38.3)	−2.4 (27.7)	6.4 (43.5)
Mean daily minimum °C (°F)	−11.4 (11.5)	−10.6 (12.9)	−6.4 (20.5)	−0.9 (30.4)	3.7 (38.7)	8.3 (46.9)	12.2 (54.0)	12.2 (54.0)	7.9 (46.2)	2.9 (37.2)	−1.0 (30.2)	−7.1 (19.2)	0.8 (33.4)
Record low °C (°F)	−34.0 (−29.2)	−33.0 (−27.4)	−31.0 (−23.8)	−15.0 (5.0)	−7.8 (18.0)	−3.0 (26.6)	1.1 (34.0)	−1.5 (29.3)	−4.5 (23.9)	−10.6 (12.9)	−21.0 (−5.8)	−34.0 (−29.2)	−34.0 (−29.2)
Average precipitation mm (inches)	129.8 (5.11)	100.5 (3.96)	124.2 (4.89)	109.0 (4.29)	105.4 (4.15)	99.8 (3.93)	103.8 (4.09)	91.9 (3.62)	110.7 (4.36)	116.7 (4.59)	136.8 (5.39)	129.1 (5.08)	1,357.6 (53.45)
Average rainfall mm (inches)	80.4 (3.17)	62.1 (2.44)	92.8 (3.65)	99.5 (3.92)	104.9 (4.13)	99.8 (3.93)	103.8 (4.09)	91.9 (3.62)	110.7 (4.36)	116.7 (4.59)	128.6 (5.06)	97.2 (3.83)	1,188.3 (46.78)
Average snowfall cm (inches)	49.4 (19.4)	41.3 (16.3)	31.4 (12.4)	9.5 (3.7)	0.5 (0.2)	0.0 (0.0)	0.0 (0.0)	0.0 (0.0)	0.0 (0.0)	0.0 (0.0)	8.2 (3.2)	31.9 (12.6)	172.2 (67.8)
Average precipitation days (≥ 0.2 mm)	14.8	12.1	13.7	15.0	14.9	14.0	12.7	12.7	12.3	14.7	15.8	14.5	167.1
Average rainy days (≥ 0.2 mm)	7.5	6.0	9.4	14.0	14.8	14.0	12.7	12.7	12.3	14.7	14.8	10.1	143.1
Average snowy days (≥ 0.2 cm)	9.0	7.5	5.4	1.8	0.08	0.0	0.0	0.0	0.0	0.0	1.9	6.2	31.8
Source: Environment Canada
