= Fraser Settlement, Nova Scotia =

Locality in Nova Scotia, Canada

Coordinates: 45°6′16.48″N 62°58′23.84″W

Fraser Settlement in Nova Scotia

Fraser Settlement is a locality in the Canadian province of Nova Scotia, located in the Halifax Regional Municipality in the Musquodoboit Valley.
