= Devon, Nova Scotia =

Community in Nova Scotia, Canada

Coordinates: 44°53′30.1″N 63°23′4″W

Devon in Nova Scotia

Devon is a small Canadian rural community in Nova Scotia's Halifax Regional Municipality with an approximate area of 152.79 square kilometers.

It is located 32 kilometers north of Dartmouth near the Halifax International Airport on the Old Guysborough Road (Route 212). Its name is derived from Devonshire in the United Kingdom by settler farmers from that community who worked on the Oakfield estate on Shubenacadie Grand Lake.
