= Gibraltar Rock Provincial Park Reserve =

Park in Nova Scotia, Canada

Coordinates: 44°48′16.73″N 63°10′29.97″W

Gibraltar Rock Provincial Park Reserve is a park and trail in Gibraltar in the Musquodoboit Valley in the Halifax Regional Municipality of Nova Scotia.
