= Wyses Corner, Nova Scotia =

Community in Nova Scotia, Canada

Coordinates: 44°57′27″N 63°18′13″W

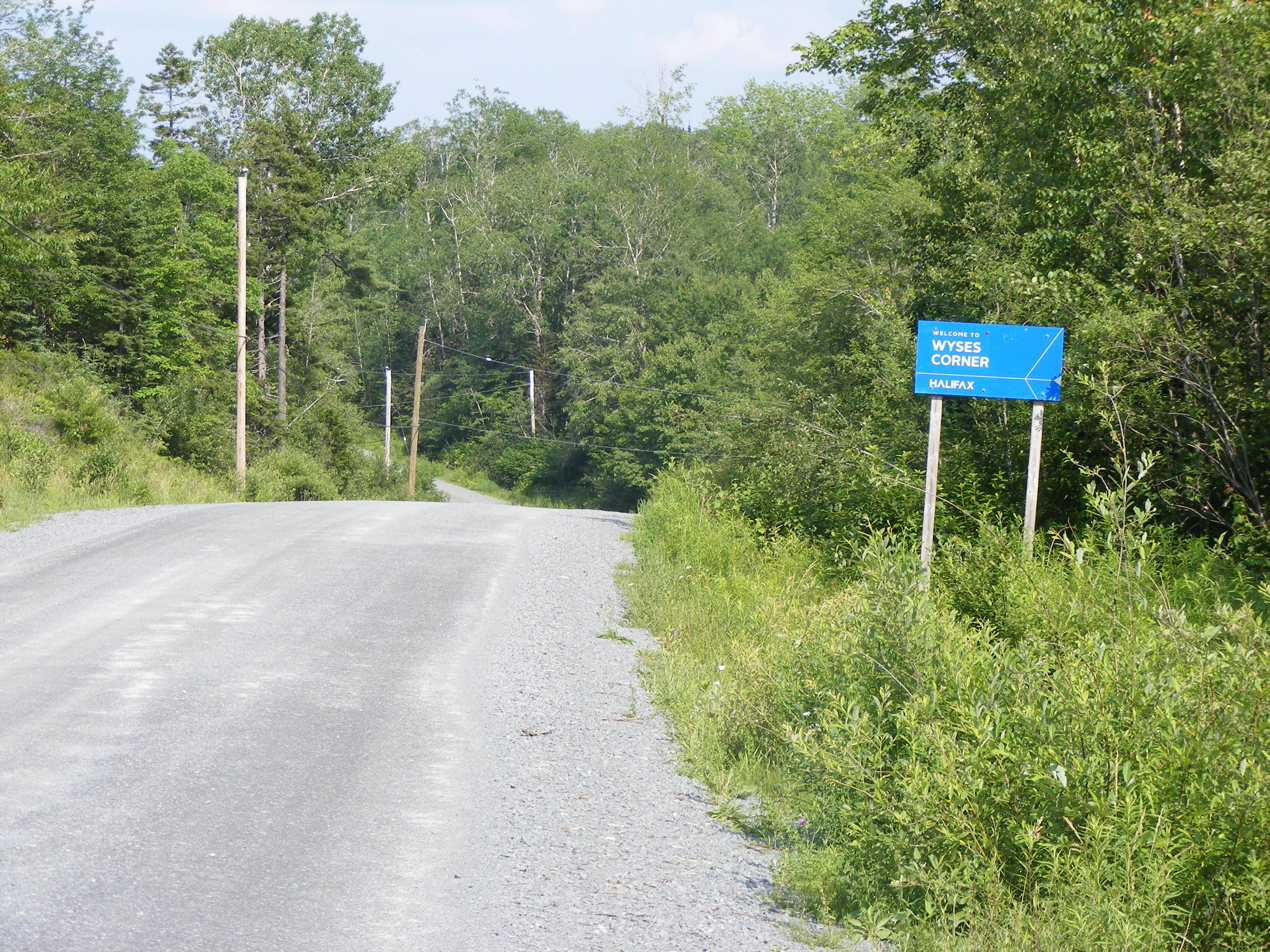
Wyses Corner, July 2023.

Wyses Corner in Nova Scotia

Wyses Corner is a farming community in the Musquodoboit Valley area of the Halifax Regional Municipality, Nova Scotia on Route 212.

== Communications ==
- The postal Code is B0N 1Y0
- The Telephone exchange is 902-384
