= Meaghers Grant, Nova Scotia =

Rural community in Nova Scotia, Canada

Meaghers Grant is a rural community in the Musquodoboit Valley region of the eastern Halifax Regional Municipality Nova Scotia on Route 357 . The community is located on the Musquodoboit River and the economy is mainly farming and forestry. It is approximately 45 minutes away from Halifax, the province's capital city. The River Oaks Golf course is located there.

Route 357 in Meaghers Grant.

== History ==
Meaghers Grant was land owned by Captain Martin Meagher (pronounced Mar, but the community name is sometimes pronounced MY-ers) in 1783. John Dunbrack was the first person to build a frame house in the Meaghers Grant area, and he and his wife were granted Gibraltar, an area south of Meaghers Grant by Captain Martin Meagher in 1786.

== Communications ==
- The postal Code is B0N 1V0
- The telephone exchange is 902 384

== Attractions ==
Meaghers Grant in Nova Scotia
- Meaghers Grant Fire Hall
- River Oaks Golf Course and Lodge
- Old Mechanical Garage (Previous owner: Weldon Cole)
- Meaghers Grant United Church
- Meaghers Grant Community Hall
