= Marinette, Nova Scotia =

Community in Nova Scotia, Canada

Coordinates: 44°58′21.9″N 62°39′14.2″W

Marinette in Nova Scotia

Marinette is a rural community on the Eastern Shore of Nova Scotia, Canada, in the Halifax Regional Municipality. It is located along Route 224, 11 km (6.8 mi) northwest of Sheet Harbour, along West River. The first land grant here was given to David Redmond from Antrim, Ireland, in 1828.
