= Gibraltar, Nova Scotia =

Community in Nova Scotia, Canada

Coordinates: 44°48′16.73″N 63°10′29.97″W

Gibraltar in Nova Scotia

Gibraltar is a rural community of the Halifax Regional Municipality in the Canadian province of Nova Scotia on Nova Scotia Route 357, approximately 15 km north of Musquodoboit Harbour.

== Recreation and facilities ==
There are no permanent residents here, but it is the northern terminus of the Musquodoboit Trailway, a 14.5 km multi-use rail-to-trail. In addition, two of the Musquodoboit Trailways' wilderness trails, namely the North Granite Ridge Trail and the Gibraltar Rock Trail, begin here.
