= Musquodoboit Rural High School =

Location
- 11980 Highway 224; Middle Musquodoboit, Nova Scotia; Canada; 45.0524°N 63.1336°W

Information
- Type: High School
- Motto: none
- Established: 1951
- Principal: Joanne Rushton
- Grades: 7–12
- Enrollment: 258 (2023)
- Colors: Black and Gold
- Mascot: Mustang
- Website: www.mrhs.ednet.ns.ca

Musquodoboit Rural High School, is a public secondary school in Middle Musquodoboit, Nova Scotia. It holds grades 7–12. It was founded in 1951, with a new school building that opened in 2008. MRHS is a predominantly English school, however, it offers an Integrated French Program. Their team name is the Mustangs and their colours are gold and black. It is the second smallest high school in the HRM due to the small population of the area. They are a Bully Aware school and are also scent and peanut aware. They have clubs and teams such as Student Council, GSA (Gay Straight Alliance), Track and Field, Softball, Soccer, Volleyball, Basketball, Badminton, Table Tennis, Band Programs, School Musicals, Mathematics Contests, Yearbook Committee, Graduation Committee, Prom Committee, Fundraising Committee, Change a Life Group, We Day Committee, Magic The Gathering Club.

Musquodoboit Rural High School has three feeder schools, those of which are Upper Musquodoboit Consolidated School, Dutch Settlement Elementary School, and Musquodoboit Valley Education Centre.
