= Elderbank, Nova Scotia =

Farming community in Nova Scotia, Canada

Coordinates: 44°58′49″N 63°13′01″W

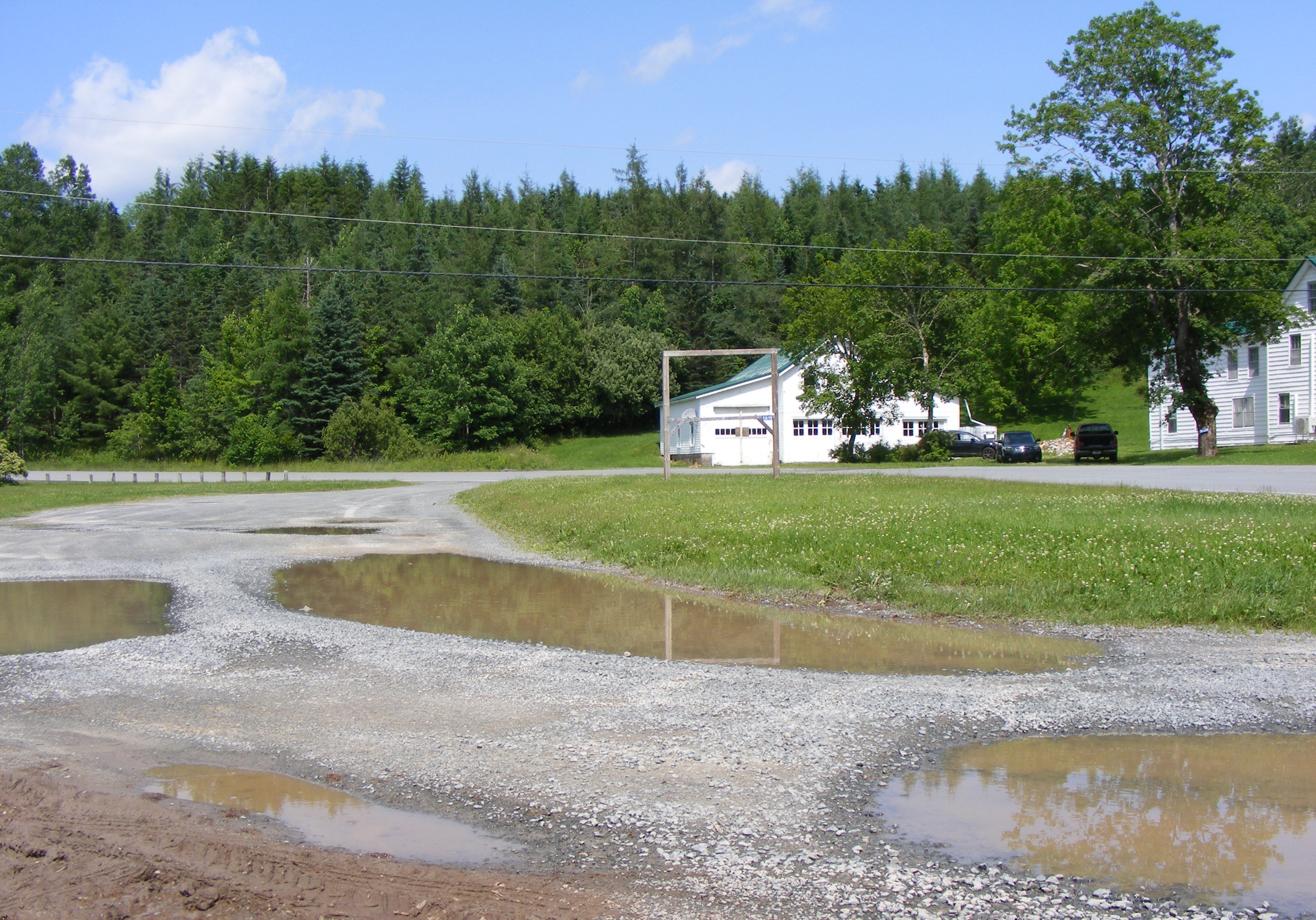
Elderbank, July 2023.

Elderbank in Nova Scotia

Elderbank is a farming community in the Musquodoboit Valley area of the Halifax Regional Municipality, Nova Scotia. Elderbank is located in the Southeast Branch Musquodoboit. Other communities in this branch include, Meaghers Grant, Nova Scotia.

== Communications ==
- The postal Code is B0N 1K0
- The Telephone exchange is 902-384

== Parks ==
- Musquodoboit River - Elderbank Provincial Park
