= Pine Grove, Colchester County =

Community in Nova Scotia, Canada

Coordinates: 45°2′23.31″N 63°22′41.04″W

Pine Grove in Nova Scotia

Pine Grove is a community in the Canadian province of Nova Scotia, located in Colchester County.
