= Gays River =

Community in Nova Scotia, Canada

- Location within Nova Scotia
- Coordinates: 45°2′1.9″N 63°21′16.6″W
- Country: Canada
- Province: Nova Scotia

Gays River is an unincorporated community in the Canadian province of Nova Scotia, located in both Halifax Regional Municipality and Colchester County. The community is located along the Gays River, from which the community derives its name. The Wilson family were early settlers there in 1861 and operated a family farm for many generations, including a sawmill.
