= Cooks Brook, Nova Scotia =

Community in Nova Scotia, Canada

Coordinates: 45°1′37.9″N 63°17′12.4″W

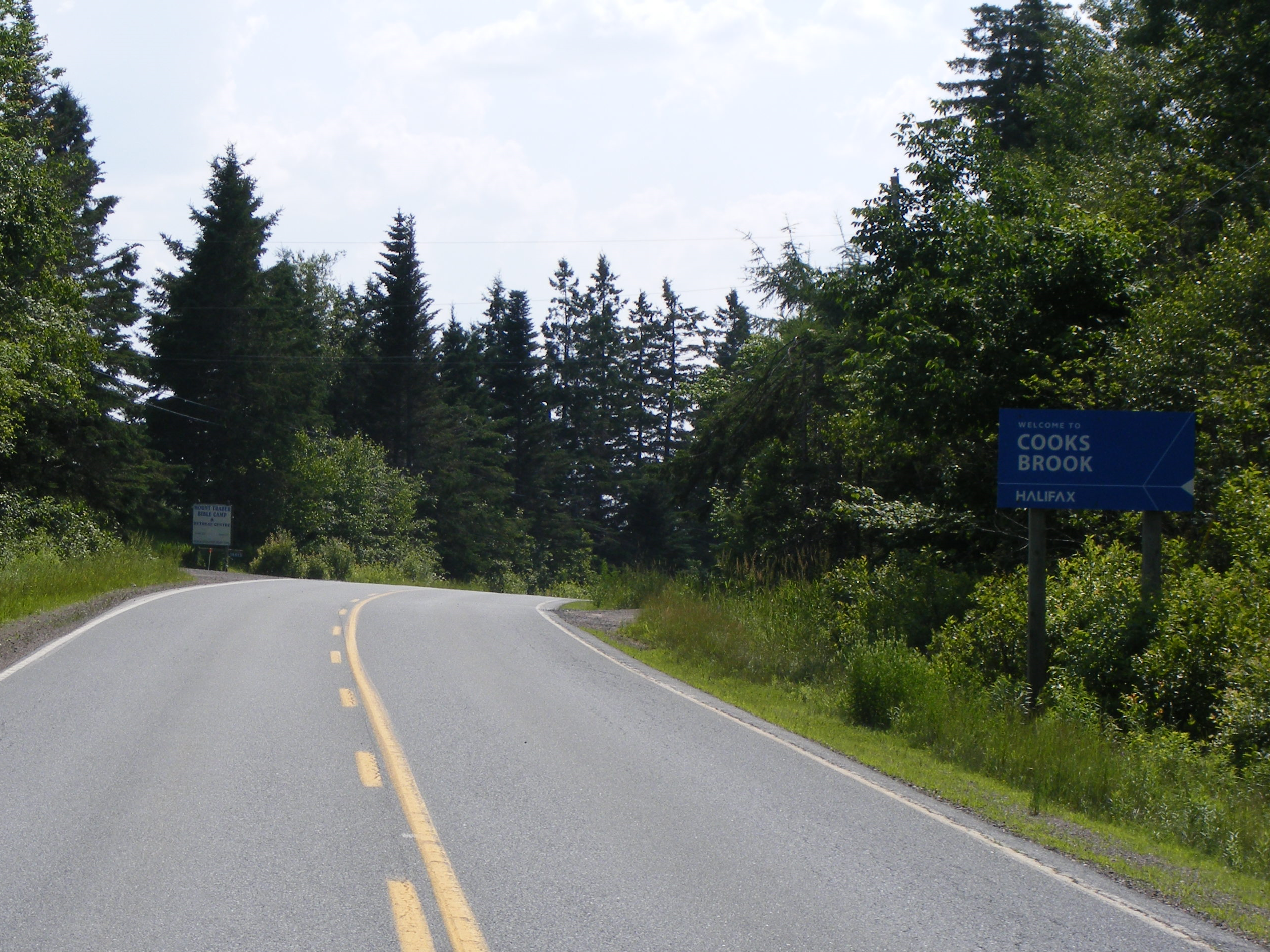
Cooks Brook, July 2023.

Cooks Brook in Nova Scotia

Cooks Brook is a small community found in the Southwest Branch Musquodoboit of the Musquodoboit Valley in Nova Scotia, Canada. Cooks Brook is located along the Halifax Regional Municipality/Colchester County border.
