= Upper Musquodoboit, Nova Scotia =

Community in Nova Scotia, Canada

Upper Musquodoboit
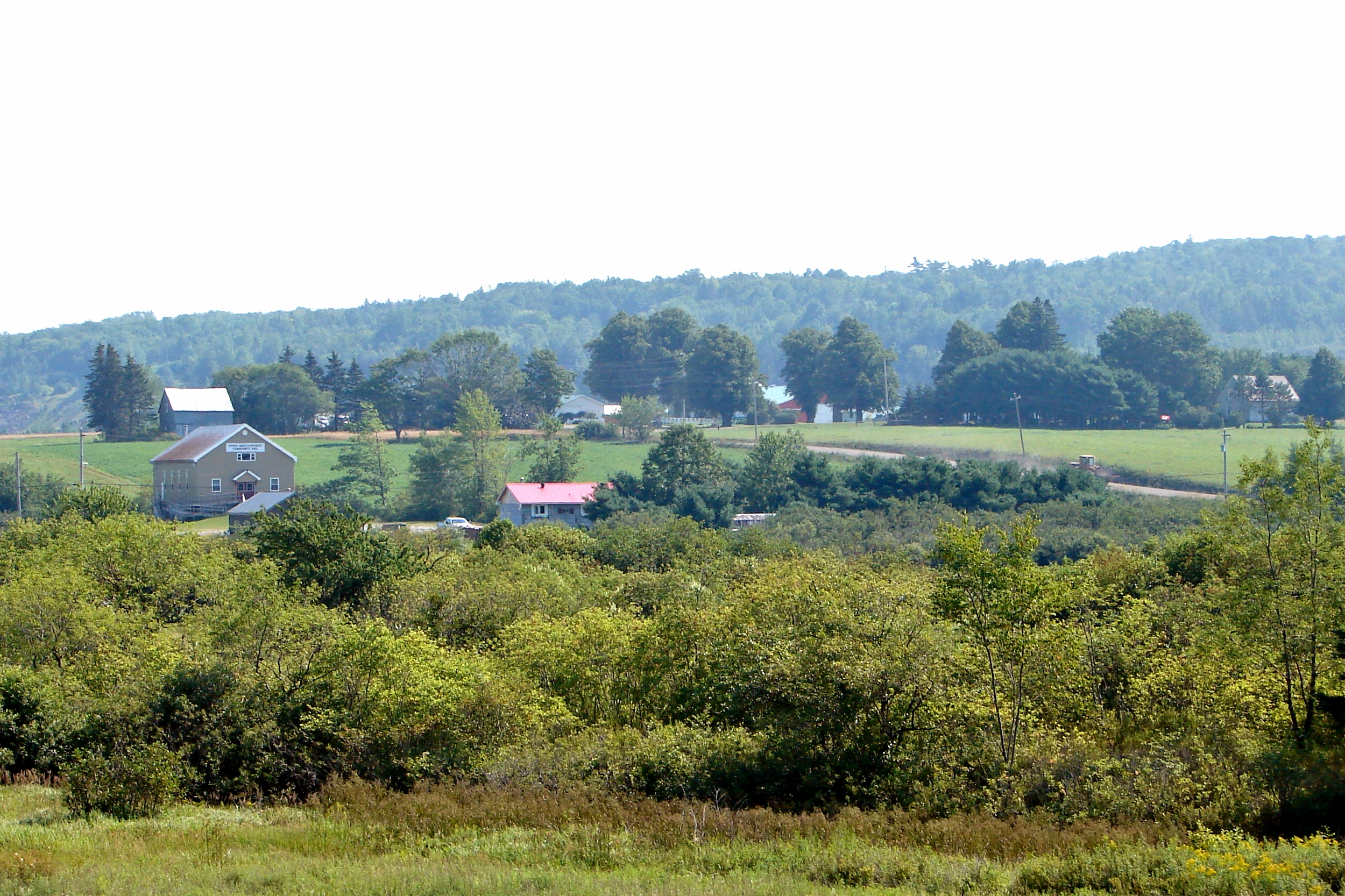
- Upper Musquodoboit

- Location within Nova Scotia
- Coordinates: 45.08°N 62.57°W
- Country: Canada
- Province: Nova Scotia

Area
  - Total: 380.25 km^{2} (146.82 sq mi)

Population (2006)
  - Total: 473
- Time zone: AST
- Postal code: B0N 2M0
- Area code: 902
- Telephone exchange: 902-568

Upper Musquodoboit is a forestry and farming community in the northeastern reaches of the Musquodoboit Valley, Nova Scotia, Canada within the Halifax Regional Municipality, 75 kilometres (47 mi) from Downtown Halifax. The community is located along the Musquodoboit River. The community had a population of 473 at the 2006 Census and the community has an area of 380.25 square kilometres (146.82 mi^{2}). Upper Musquodoboit is situated at the junction of Route 336 with Route 224.

Upper Musquodoboit Elementary School is the only school in the community. It teaches grades primary through six, and was built in 1962. As of 2017, there are 27 students enrolled in the school. For children who are grade seven or higher, they go to Musquodoboit Rural High School (MRHS) for school. Upper Musquodoboit also has a convenience store, an auto-body shop and a limestone mine.

The Mactara forest products company was based in Upper Musquodoboit.
