= Musquodoboit River =

Coordinates: 44°46′59.9″N 63°7′56.9″W

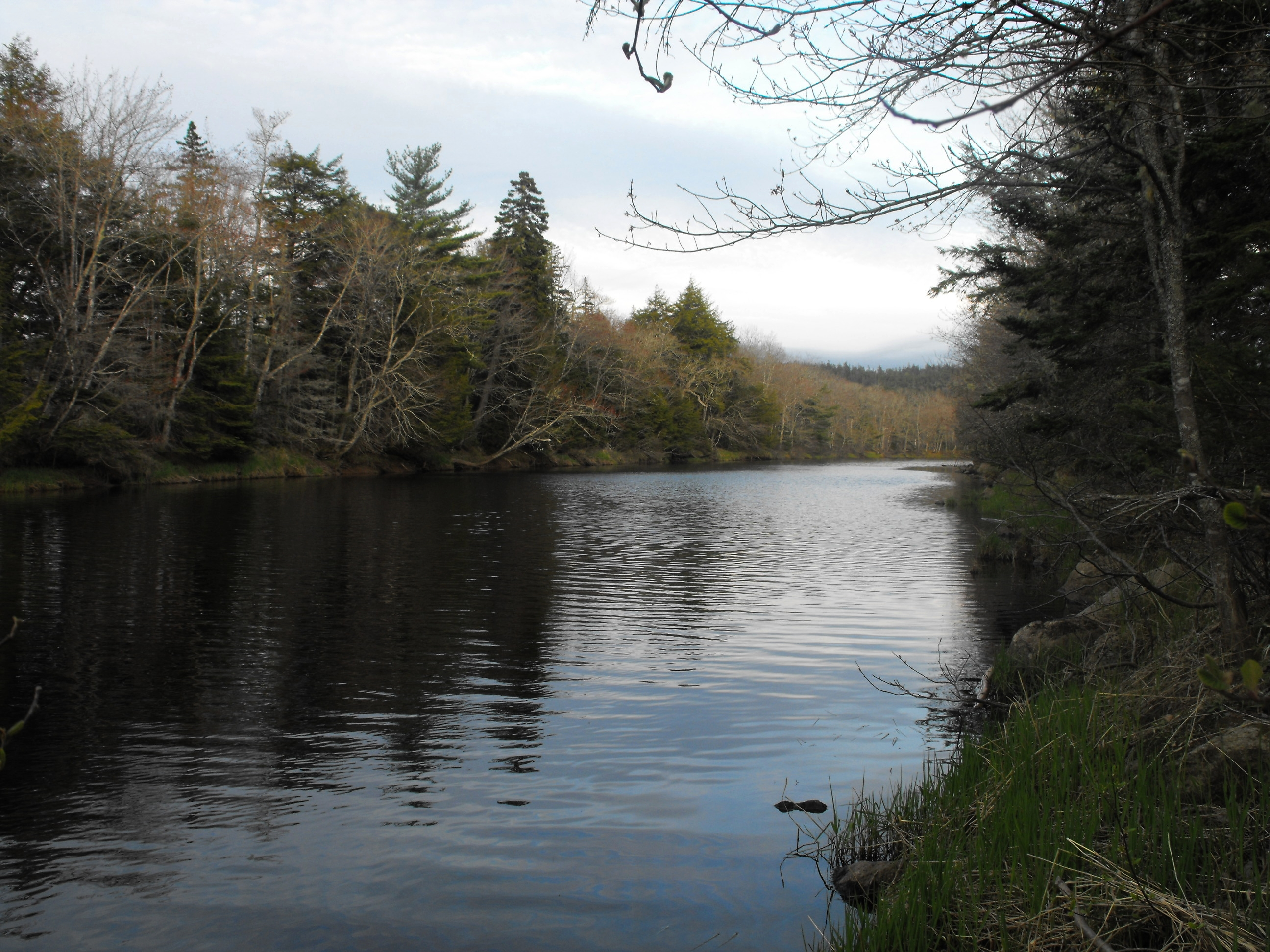
- View of the lower reaches of the Musquodoboit River

Location
- Country: Canada
- Province: Nova Scotia

Physical characteristics
- Mouth: Musquodoboit Harbour
- Length: 97 km (60 mi)
- Basin size: 1,409 km^{2} (544 sq mi)

The Musquodoboit River /ˌmʌskəˈdɒbɪt/ is a Canadian river located in central Nova Scotia in the northeastern part of Halifax Regional Municipality. The river is approximately 97 kilometres (60 mi) in length with roughly 88 kilometres (55 mi) being traversable by paddle. It has a watershed area of 1,409 square kilometres (544 mi^{2})

The name "Musquodoboit" is Mi'kmaq, roughly translated to "beautiful water". It rises in the extreme northeastern part of the county near the boundary with Pictou and Guysborough counties. Rising in the Cobequid Mountains, the river runs in a southwesterly direction along the Halifax-Colchester county line through the fertile Musquodoboit Valley; Glenmore Mountain is on the north and a series of low hills are on the south. Near the halfway point, the river changes course at a right angle, running toward the southeast where it empties into a bay on the Atlantic Ocean called Musquodoboit Harbour. other communities along its length include Middle Musquodoboit, Moose River, Elderbank, Meaghers Grant and Upper Musquodoboit. Dollar Lake flows into the Musquodoboit River.

The river is a popular recreational destination in central Nova Scotia, as its calm and lack of rapids or waterfalls makes it ideal for paddling sports like canoeing and kayaking. According to estimates by the Province of Nova Scotia, there were 27,846 people residing within the Musquodoboit River watershed in 2011.

== See also ==
- List of rivers of Nova Scotia
