= Lantz, Nova Scotia =

Community in Nova Scotia, Canada

Lantz
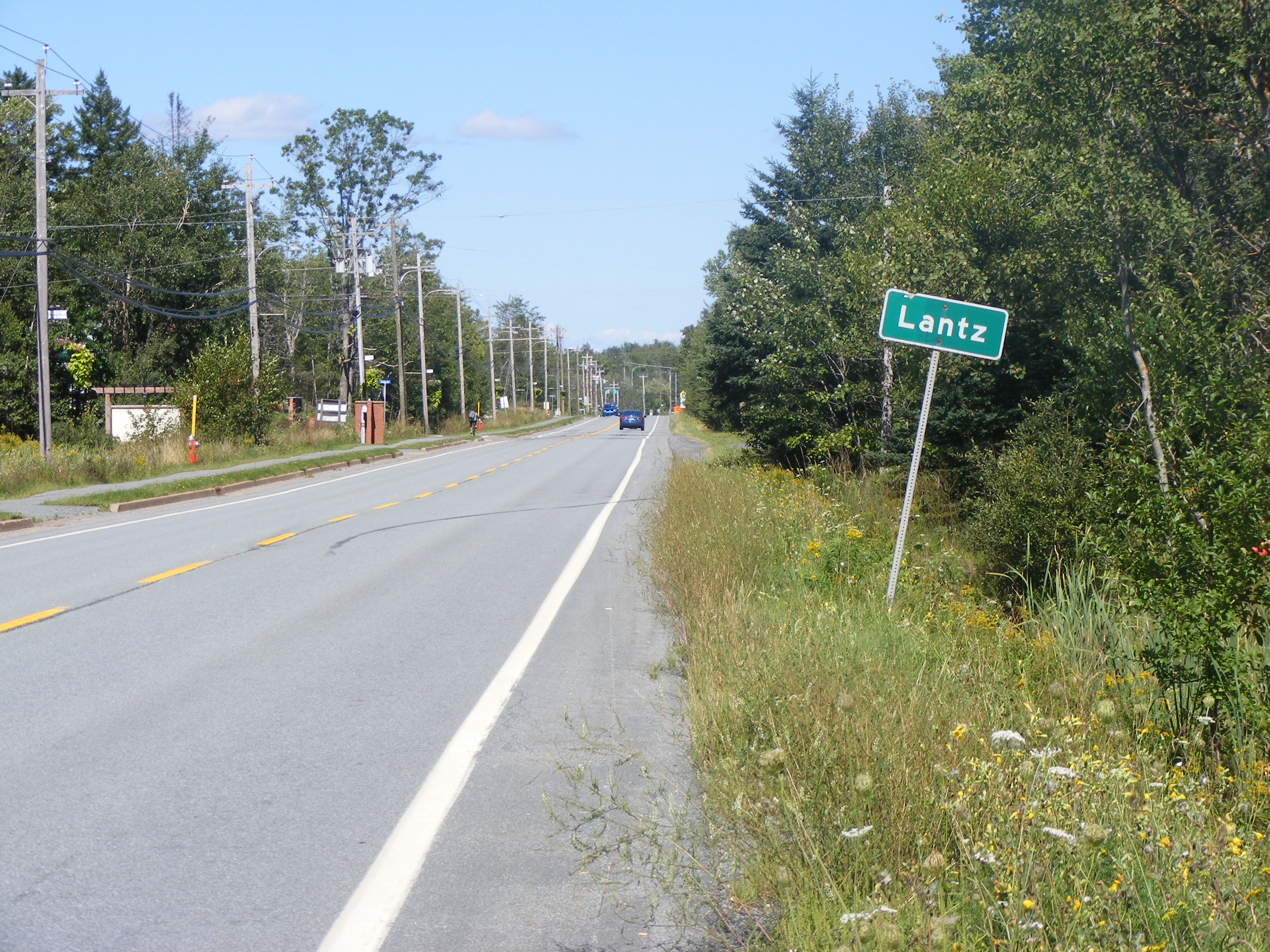

- Location in Nova Scotia
- Coordinates: 44°59′14″N 63°28′45″W
- Country: Canada
- Province: Nova Scotia
- Municipality: Halifax Regional Municipality

Area
  - Land: 2.97 km^{2} (1.15 sq mi)

Population (2021)
  - Total: 1,703
  - Density: 573.6/km^{2} (1,486/sq mi)
- Time zone: UTC-4 (AST)
  - Summer (DST): UTC-3 (ADT)
- Area code: 902

Lantz (formerly known as Lantz Siding) is an unincorporated community in the Canadian province of Nova Scotia, located in the Municipal District of East Hants and the Halifax Regional Municipality. The community is located on the Shubenacadie River between the communities of Milford and Elmsdale.

The lands including present-day Lantz were granted to Richard Gibbon and Dr. John Marshall on June 2nd, 1785. The community was named "Lantz Siding" in 1898 by a man named Lantz who operated a brick and tile factory in the area. L. E. Shaw Limited was incorporated in 1921 after building a brick and tile plant in the area in 1913.

On June 24, 1997, Lantz was hit by a tornado.

== Demographics ==
In the 2021 Census of Population conducted by Statistics Canada, Lantz had a population of 1,703 living in 686 of its 696 total private dwellings, a change of −23.6% from its 2016 population of 2,229. With a land area of 2.97 km^{2} (1.15 sq mi), it had a population density of 573.4/km^{2} (1,485.1/sq mi) in 2021.
