= Carrolls Corner =

Community in Nova Scotia, Canada

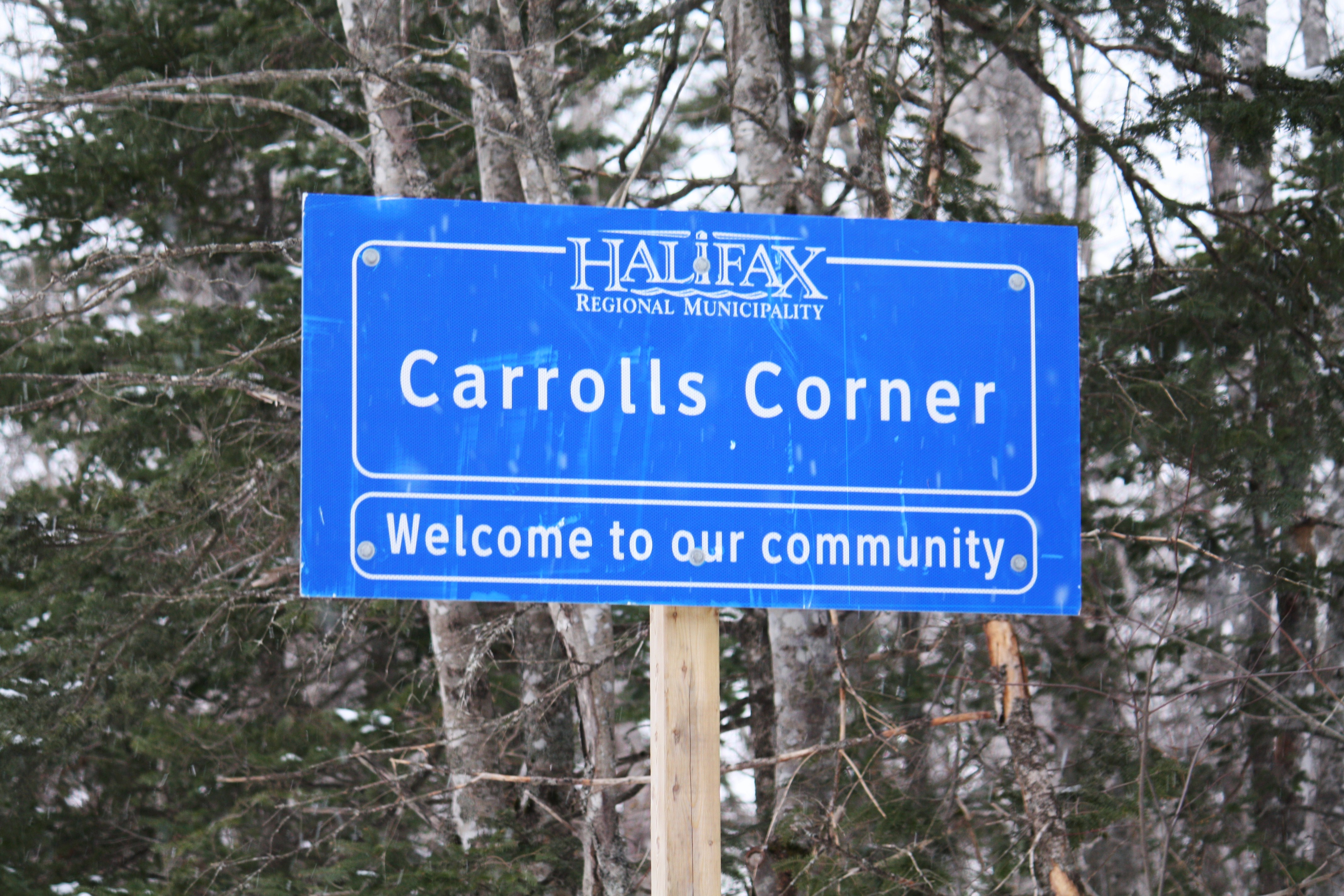
- Entering the community

- Location within Nova Scotia
- Coordinates: 45°0′21.6″N 63°22′53.2″W
- Country: Canada
- Province: Nova Scotia
- Municipality: Halifax Regional Municipality
- Settled: 1843
- Time zone: UTC-4 (AST)
  - Summer (DST): UTC-3 (ADT)
- Canadian Postal Code: B0N
- Area code: 902
- Telephone Exchange: 758

Carrolls Corner is a rural community in the northwestern part of the Halifax Regional Municipality in of Nova Scotia, Canada. The community is located along Highway 277 and extends to the North and South along the Milford Road and Antrim Road, respectively. The community was named after its first settler, John Carroll.

The world's largest open pit gypsum mine, owned by National Gypsum Company, is located partially in Carroll's Corner. The discovery of mastodon fossils in the mine in 1991 led to the community's annual week-long 'Mastodon Days' celebration in July.
