= List of communities in Guysborough County, Nova Scotia =

List of communities in Guysborough County, Nova Scotia

Communities are ordered by the highway on which they are located, whose routes start after each terminus near the largest community.

== Trunk routes ==
- Trunk 7: Aspen - Melrose - Stillwater - Sherbrooke - Goldenville - Liscomb - Spanish Ship Bay - Liscomb Mills - Marie Joseph - Ecum Secum
- Trunk 16: Canso - Hazel Hill - Fox Island Main - Philips Harbour - Queensport - Halfway Cove - Guysborough - Boylston

== Collector roads ==
- Route 211: Isaac's Harbour North - Port Bickerton - Harpellville - Port Hilford - Indian Harbour Lake - Jordanville
- Route 276: Goshen
- Route 316: Argyle - Goshen - Eight Island Lake - Cross Roads Country Harbour - Country Harbour Mines - Isaac's Harbour North - Goldboro - Drumhead - Seal Harbour - Coddle's Harbour - New Harbour - Larry's River - Charlos Cove - Cole Harbour - Port Felix
- Route 344: Aulds Cove - Mulgrave - Steep Creek- Middle Melford - Sand Point - St. Francis Harbour - Port Shoreham - Manchester - Boylston
- Route 348: Glenelg - Smithfield - Lower Caledonia - Caledonia
- Route 376: Trafalgar

== Rural roads ==
- Alder River
- Borneo
- Cameron Settlement
- Crow's Nest
- Little Dover
- Erinville
- Forest Hill
- Giant's Lake
- Glencoe
- Glenkeen
- Isaac's Harbour
- Lincolnville
- Lundy
- Marshall Point
- Moose Point
- New Chester
- Ogden
- Roachvale
- Roman Valley
- Salmon River Lake
- Spanish Ship Bay
- Sonora
- South Merland
- St Mary's River
- Sunnyville
- Torbay
- Whitehead
- Wine Harbour
