= Marine Drive (Nova Scotia) =

Scenic route in Nova Scotia, Canada

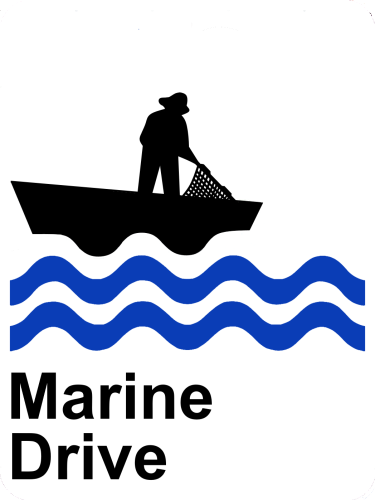
Marine Drive

Route information
- Maintained by Department of Transportation and Infrastructure Renewal
- Length: 414 km (257 mi) 16 km (10 mi) spur to Canso
- Component highways: Trunk 7; Trunk 16; Route 207; Route 211; Route 316; Route 322; Route 344

Major junctions
- West end: Dartmouth
- East end: Hwy 104 (TCH) / Trunk 4 in Auld's Cove

Location
- Country: Canada
- Province: Nova Scotia
- Counties: Halifax Regional Municipality, Guysborough County

Highway system
- Provincial highways in Nova Scotia; 100-series

The Marine Drive is a designated scenic route along Nova Scotia's Eastern Shore. It closely follows the coast of the Atlantic Ocean and the Strait of Canso from the Canso Causeway to the junction of Route 322 and Highway 111 in Dartmouth.

== List of highways ==
- Trunk 7
- Trunk 16
- Route 207
- Route 211
- Route 316
- Route 322
- Route 344

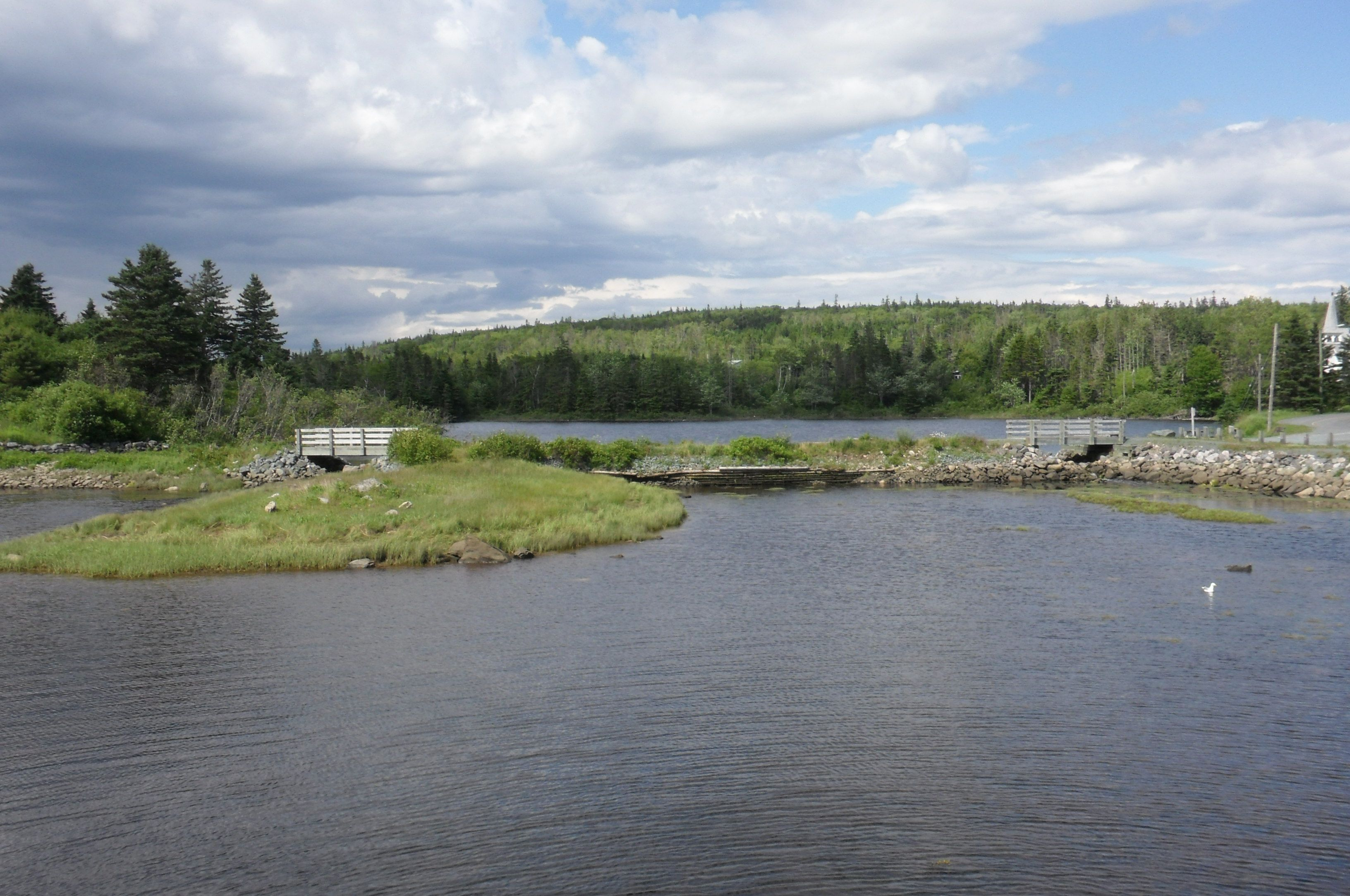
Jeddore Oyster Ponds

== List of communities ==
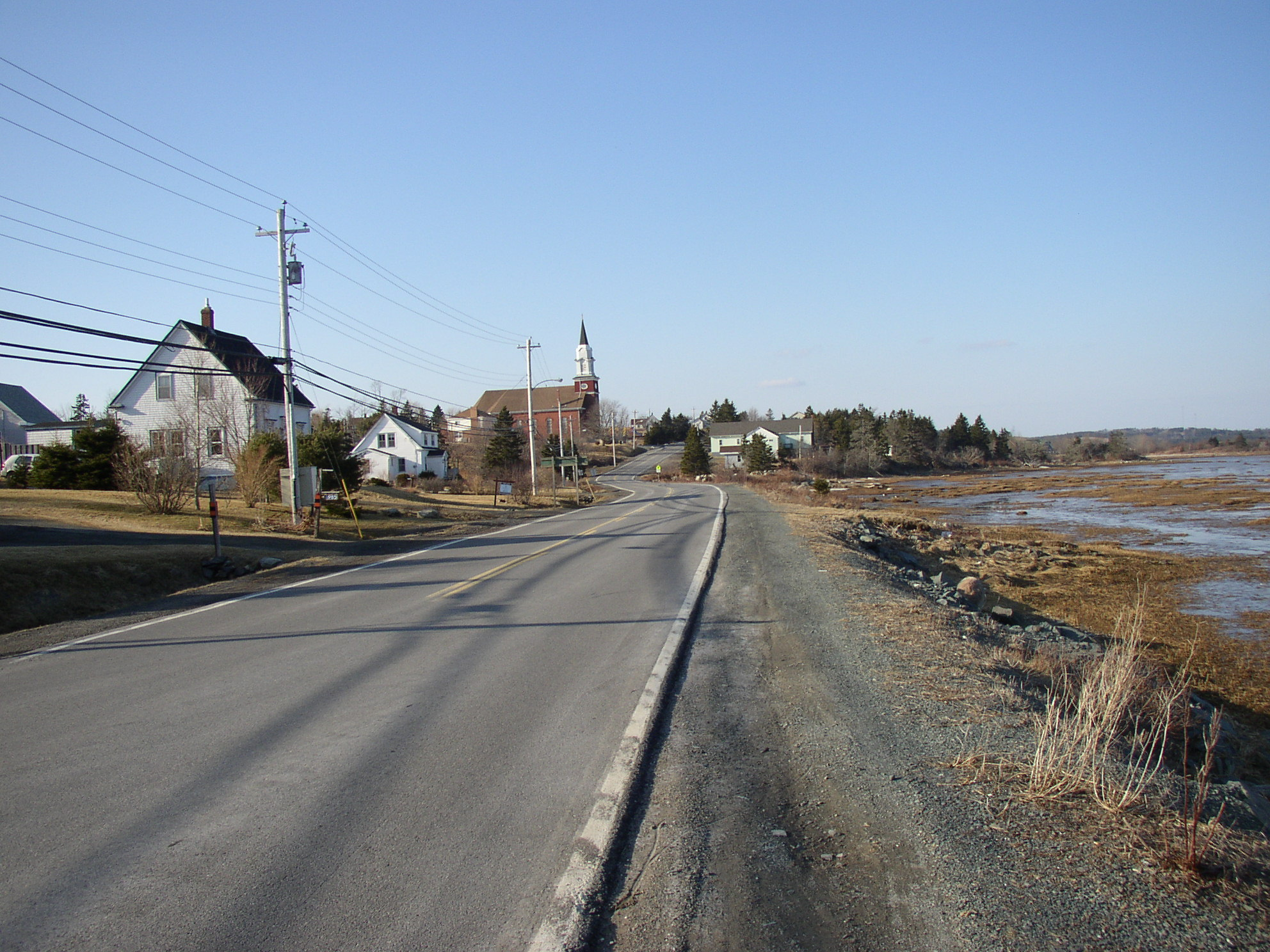
West Chezzetcook

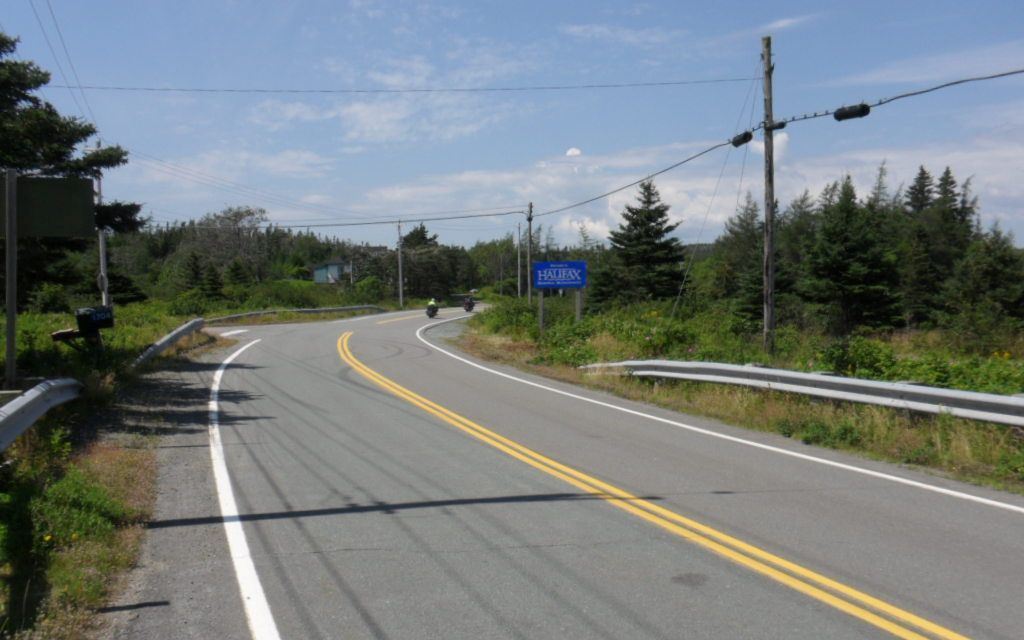
Ecum Secum

—Route 322

- Dartmouth
- Shearwater
- Eastern Passage
- Cow Bay
- Cole Harbour

— Route 207

- Upper Lawrencetown
- West Lawrencetown
- East Lawrencetown
- Three Fathom Harbour
- Seaforth
- Grand Desert
- West Chezzetcook

— Trunk 7

- Porters Lake
- Head of Chezzetcook
- Gaetz Brook
- Musquodoboit Harbour
- Smiths Settlement
- Jeddore
- Salmon River Bridge
- Oyster Pond
- Lake Charlotte
- Beech Hill
- Ship Harbour
- East Ship Harbour
- Murphy Cove
- Pleasant Harbour
- Tangier
- Popes Harbour
- Spry Harbour
- Spry Bay
- Mushaboom
- Sheet Harbour
- Watt Section
- Beaver Harbour
- Port Dufferin
- West Quoddy
- East Quoddy
- Harrigan Cove
- Moosehead
- Moser River
- Necum Teuch
- Ecum Secum
- Marie Joseph
- Liscomb Mills
- Spanish Ship Bay
- Liscomb
- Goldenville
- Sherbrooke

— Route 211

- Stillwater
- Jordanville
- Indian Harbour Lake
- Port Hilford
- Harpellville
- Port Bickerton
- Isaac's Harbour North

— Route 316

- Goldboro
- Drum Head
- Seal Harbour
- Coddle's Harbour
- New Harbour West
- New Harbour East
- Tor Bay
- Larry's River
- Charlos Cove
- Cole Harbour
- Port Felix
- Whitehead

— Trunk 16

- Canso
- Hazel Hill
- Fox Island Main
- Half Island Cove
- Philips Harbour
- Queensport
- Halfway Cove
- Guysborough
- Boylston

— Route 344

- Manchester
- Port Shoreham
- Manassette Lake
- St. Francis Harbour
- Hadleyville
- Sand Point
- Middle Melford
- Steep Creek
- Pirate Harbour
- Mulgrave
- Auld's Cove

== Parks ==
To see more, visit: Tourism on the Eastern Shore (Nova Scotia)

- Port Shoreham Beach Provincial Park
- Boylston Provincial Park
- Tor Bay Provincial Park
- Salsman Provincial Park
- Sherbrooke Provincial Park
- Marie Joseph Provincial Park
- Taylor Head Provincial Park
- Spry Bay Provincial Park
- Clam Harbour Beach Provincial Park
- Martinique Beach Provincial Park
- Porters Lake Provincial Park
- Lawrencetown Beach Provincial Park
- Rainbow Haven Beach Provincial Park
- McNabs and Lawlor's Island Provincial Park
- Bissett Road Trail
- Cole Harbour-Lawrencetown Coastal Heritage Park System
- Moser River Interpretive Trail
- Musquodoboit Trail System
- Moser River Seaside Park
- Tangier Grand Lake Wilderness Area
- West River Sheet Harbour Picnic Park
- McCormick's Beach

== Museums ==
To see more, visit: Tourism on the Eastern Shore (Nova Scotia)

- Cole Harbour Heritage Farm Museum, Cole Harbour
- Acadian House Museum/L'Acadie de Chezzetcook, West Chezzetcook
- Musquodoboit Harbour Railway Museum, Musquodoboit Harbour
- Fisherman’s Life Museum, Oyster Pond
- Memory Lane Heritage Village, Lake Charlotte
- Moose River Gold Mines Museum, Moose River Gold Mines
- MacPhee House Museum, Sheet Harbour
- Sherbrooke Village, Sherbrooke
- Saint Mary's River Salmon Museum, Sherbrooke
- Baird's Tradesman Museum, Aspen
- Port Bickerton Lighthouse Interpretive Centre, Port Bickerton
- Goldboro Interpretive Centre, Goldboro
- Out of the Fog Lighthouse Museum, Half Island Cove
- Canso Islands National Historic Site, Canso
- Whitman House, Canso
- The Old Courthouse Museum, Guysborough
