= Nova Scotia Route 316 =

Highway in Nova Scotia, Canada

Route 316

Route information
- Maintained by Nova Scotia Department of Transportation and Infrastructure Renewal
- Length: 132 km (82 mi)

Major junctions
- South end: Trunk 16 in Half Island Cove
- Route 211 in Isaac's Harbour North; Route 276 in Goshen
- North end: Hwy 104 (TCH) in Lower South River

Location
- Country: Canada
- Province: Nova Scotia
- Counties: Antigonish / Guysborough County

Highway system
- Provincial highways in Nova Scotia; 100-series
← Route 312	→ Route 318

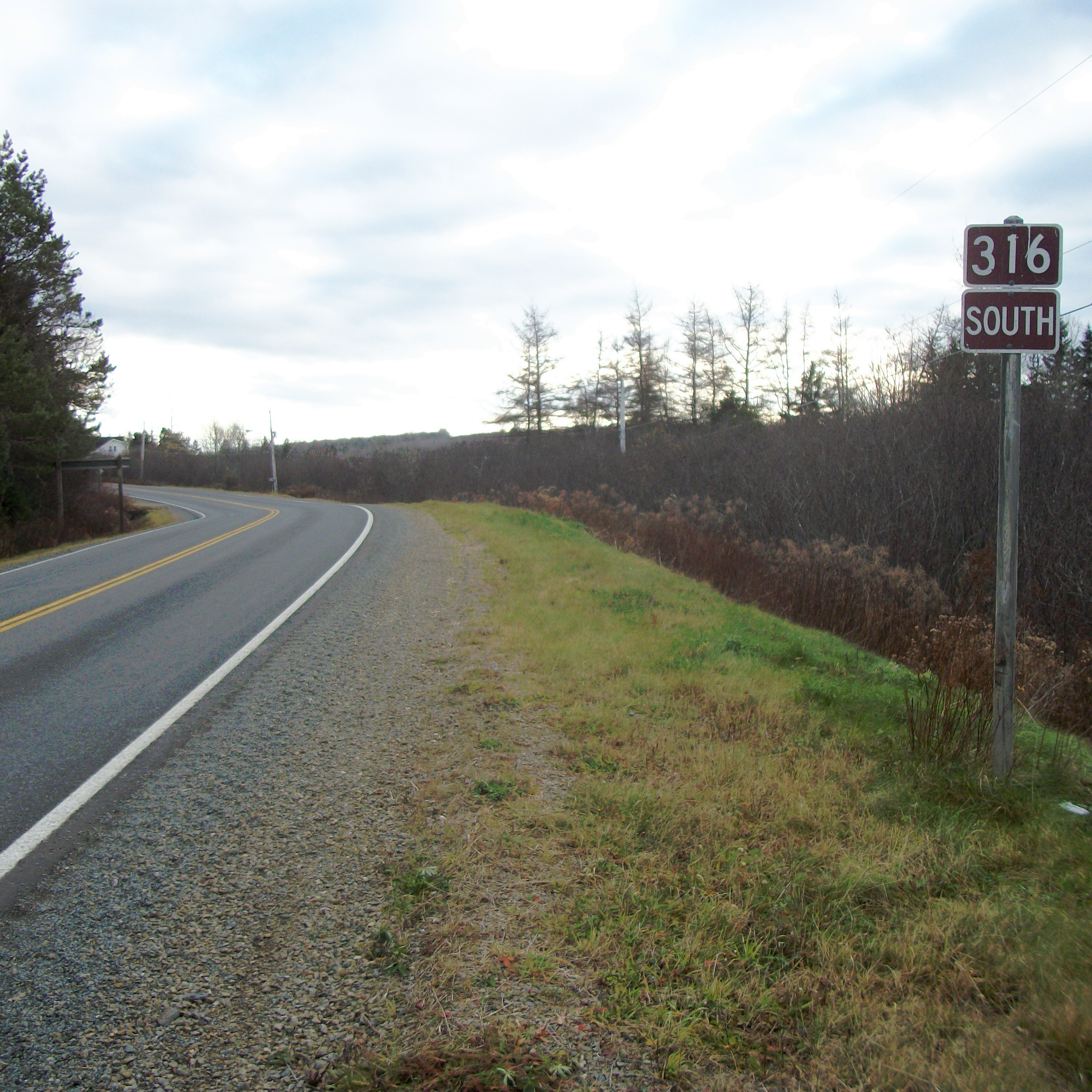
Route sign in Goshen, Guysborough County, Nova Scotia

Route 316 is a collector road in the Canadian province of Nova Scotia. It is located in Antigonish County and Guysborough County, connecting Lower South River at Highway 104 with Half Island Cove at Trunk 16.

== Communities ==
- Half Island Cove
- Upper Whitehead
- Port Felix East
- Port Felix
- Charlos Cove
- Larry's River
- New Harbour West
- Coddle's Harbour
- Drumhead
- Seal Harbour
- Goldboro
- Isaac's Harbour North
- Stormont
- Middle Country Harbour
- Country Harbour Mines
- Cross Roads Country Harbour
- Country Harbour Lake
- Fisher Mills
- Eight Island Lake
- Goshen
- Argyle
- Loch Katrine
- Upper South River
- Frasers Mills
- St. Andrews
- Lower South River

== See also ==
- List of Nova Scotia provincial highways
