= Tourism on the Eastern Shore (Nova Scotia) =

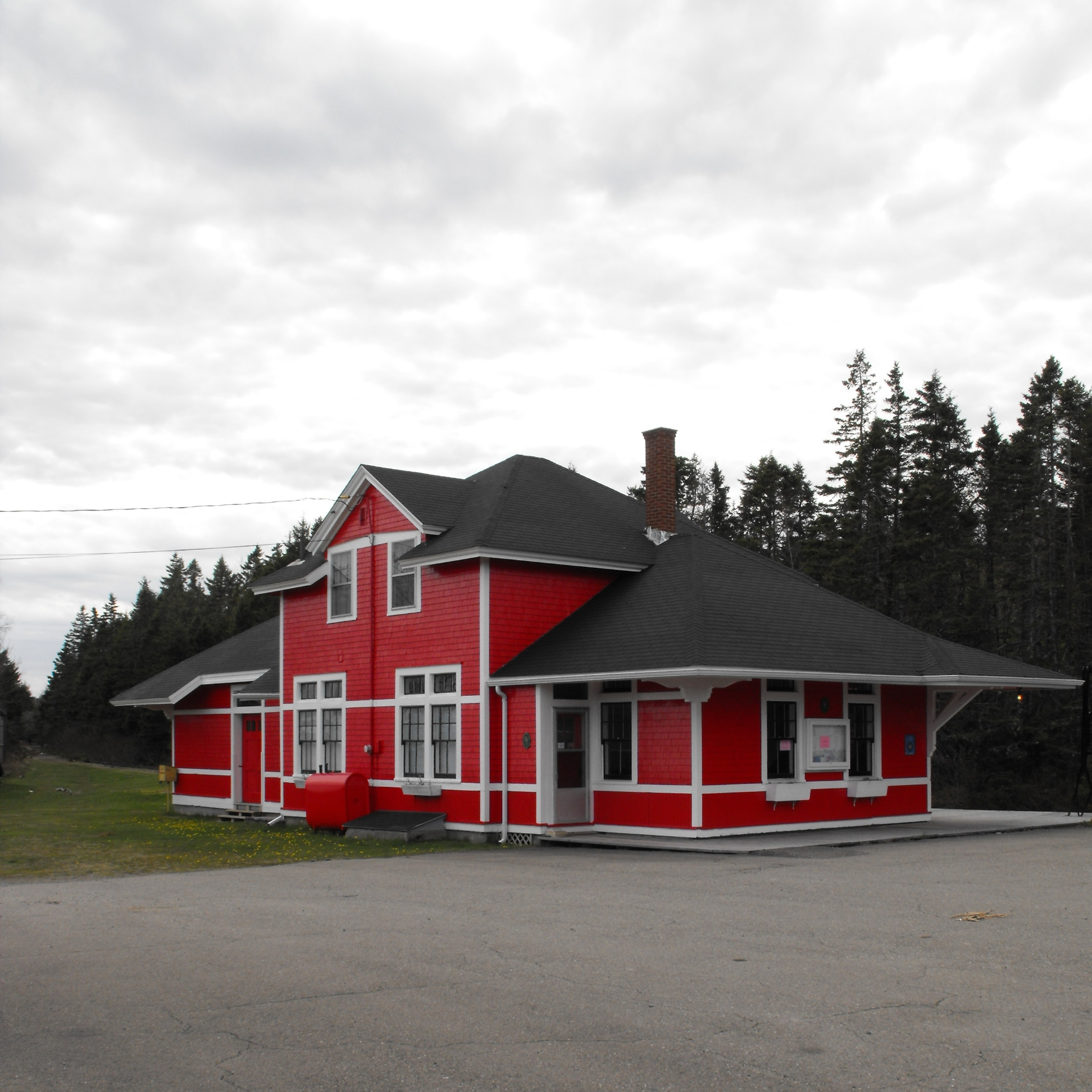
Musquodoboit Harbour Railway Museum

The Eastern Shore is a tourism region of the province of Nova Scotia, Canada. It provides two percent of the revenue for the province's tourism economy. One of its key features is an archipelago known as the 100 Wild Islands area.

== Museums and Attractions ==
- Shearwater Aviation Museum
  - This museum located in Shearwater, previews CFB Shearwater's history and other Canadian aviation sites.
- Acadian House Museum/L'Acadie de Chezzetcook
  - This museum and living museum shows local West Chezzetcook history and the ways Acadian people lived on the Eastern Shore in the 1800s.
- Musquodoboit Valley Bicentennial Theatre and Cultural Centre
  - This 230-seat theatre is located in Middle Musquodoboit, is a restored community facility that hosts musical events, dances and theatre events.
- Moose River Gold Mine Museum
  - This museum and park tells the story of the gold mining in the region and the famous gold mining disaster and rescue of 1936. It is located near Moose River Gold Mines.
- Icelandic Memorial
  - This trail, log cabin, interpretive signs and memorial, are on the site of an Icelandic settlement in the 1800s.
- Musquodoboit Harbour Railway Museum
  - This museum located in Musquodoboit Harbour explains the history of the local railway and the trains that travelled on them.
- Fisherman's Life Museum
  - This Nova Scotia Museum, previews the life of the Myers family in the early 1900s. Located in the fishing community of Oyster Pond.
- Memory Lane Heritage Village
  - This living history museum located in Lake Charlotte, depicting rural life in Nova Scotia in the 1940s. The museum hosts community events, including the Nova Scotia Forest Festival.
- MacPhee House Community Museum
  - This Sheet Harbour museum and information centre, shows the life of domestic life on the Eastern Shore and this historical building, from house to hotel and other uses. A nature trail and park are on the site as well.
- Goldenville Gold Mining Interpretive Centre
  - In the former Presbyterian church in Goldenville, this gold mining museum shows the story of the small Nova Scotia community becoming the largest gold-producing areas in the province.
- Sherbrooke Village
  - This large living museum in Sherbrooke, previews life in Sherbrooke in the 1800s. The site is a part of the Nova Scotia Museum.
- Saint Mary's River Salmon Museum
  - This museum shows the history of salmon and wildlife in the Saint Mary's River and the Sherbrooke region
- Baird's Tradesman Museum
  - This museum in Aspen, Nova Scotia, is home to some very rare antique tools from many different trades in the community and region. Some tools are as much as 200 years old.
- Port Bickerton Lighthouse Interpretive Centre
  - This lighthouse and interpretive centre informs people about lighthouses in Nova Scotia and the Port Bickerton lighthouse.
- Goldboro Interpretive Centre
  - This interpretive centre tells the local history of Goldboro, as well as the local gold mining. Goldboro is home to Nova Scotia's first natural gas plant.
- Out of the Fog Lighthouse Museum
  - This lighthouse museum previews the life of living in a lightstation and local history of Half Island Cove.
- Canso Islands National Historic Site
  - This Parks Canada National Historic Site previews the history and battles at the Grassy Island Fort and local history of Canso. A ferry is offered to get there.
- Whitman House Museum
  - The Canso museum shows the local history including the wars and battles at the small town.
- Prince Henry Sinclair Monument
  - This granite monument with interpretive centre is located in Halfway Cove. It also includes a lookout.
- Chedabucto Place Performance Centre
  - This community theatre in Guysborough, hosts many town events and many Nova Scotian musicians perform here.
- Mulgrave Road Theatre
  - This second theatre located in Guysborough, has created some of Atlantic Canada's best plays.
- Old Courthouse Museum/Old Court House 1843
  - This museum based in an old courthouse, previews Guysborough's history and the heritage and history of the courthouse.
- Mulgrave Heritage Centre
  - This heritage centre and information centre located in the community of Mulgrave, provides information about the town and its history.

== Outdoors, Beaches and Parks ==
The list does not include surfing attractions.

- Rainbow Haven Beach Provincial Park, Cow Bay
- Conrad's Beach, West Lawrencetown
- Lawrencetown Beach Provincial Park, East Lawrencetown
- Lake Echo Beach, Lake Echo
- Porter's Lake Provincial Park, Porters Lake
- Sandy Point Beach, Porters Lake
- Long Beach/Lower East Chezzetcook Provincial Park, Lower East Chezzetcook
- Petpeswick Lake Beach, Gaetz Brook
- River Oaks Golf Club, Meaghers Grant
- Dollar Lake Provincial Park, Wyse Corner
- Elderbank Waterway Provincial Park, Elderbank
- Musquodoboit Valley Provincial Park, Middle Musquodoboit
- Moose River Gold Mines Provincial Park, Moose River Gold Mines
- Martinique Beach Provincial Park, East Petpeswick
- Clam Harbour Beach Provincial Park, Clam Harbour
- E&F Webber Lakeside Park, Upper Lakeville
- Coastal Adventures, Tangier
- Taylor Head Provincial Park, Spry Bay
- Spry Bay Provincial Park, Spry Bay
- Marie Joseph Provincial Park, Liscombe Mills
- Sherbrooke Provincial Park, Sherbrooke
- Stonewall Leisure Park, Sherbrooke
- Lochiel Lake Provincial Park, Lochiel Lake
- Salsman Provincial Park, Country Harbour
- Tor Bay Provincial Park, Tor Bay
- Black Duck Cove Provincial Park, Little Dover
- Queensport Beach, Queensport
- Osprey Shores Golf Resort, Guysborough
- Boylston Provincial Park, Boylston
- Port Shoreham Beach Provincial Park, Port Shoreham

== Trails ==
- Salt Marsh Trail, Cole Harbour to West Lawrencetown
- Atlantic View Trail, East Lawrencetown to Seaforth
- Crowbar Lake Hiking Trails, Porters Lake
- Blueberry Run Trail, Porters Lake to Seaforth
- Gaetz Brook Greenway, Musquodoboit Harbour to East Chezzetcook
- Musquodoboit Trailway, Musquodoboit Harbour
- Oyster Pond Trail, Oyster Pond
- Liscombe River Trail System, Liscombe Mills
- Port Bickerton Lighthouse Beach Park Trail, Port Bickerton
- Loyalist Trail, Country Harbour
- Chapel Gully Trail, Canso
- Barrenland Trail, Queensport
- Guysborough Nature Trail, Guysborough
- Guysborough Waterfront Trail, Guysborough

== Art ==
- Old School Gallery
  - This seasonal gathering place and gallery is located in a historic elementary school in Musquodoboit Harbour.
- Clipper Gallery
  - This small gallery on the upstairs of a barber shop and lawyer's office, features art, photographs of the local community and scenic views of the Musquodoboit Harbour. The gallery and plaza is in the community of the same name.
- Eastern Shores Gallery
  - This art and gift shop includes a weekend market and flower shop and is supplying tourists with locally made gifts and crafts from over 40 artists along the Eastern Shore. This store and the work is in the Forest Hills Shopping Centre in Head of Jeddore next to a Sobeys location.
- Black Sheep Gallery
  - This is an art gallery located in West Jeddore, in a converted fish plant, and features over forty different provincial folk artists.
- Barry Colpitts House
  - Barry Colpitts is an artist who lives in this house in East Ship Harbour, which is highly decorated and is an attraction.
