= Country Harbour, Nova Scotia =

Rural community in Nova Scotia, Canada

Coordinates: 45°16′21.65″N 61°52′40.38″W

Country Harbour in Nova Scotia

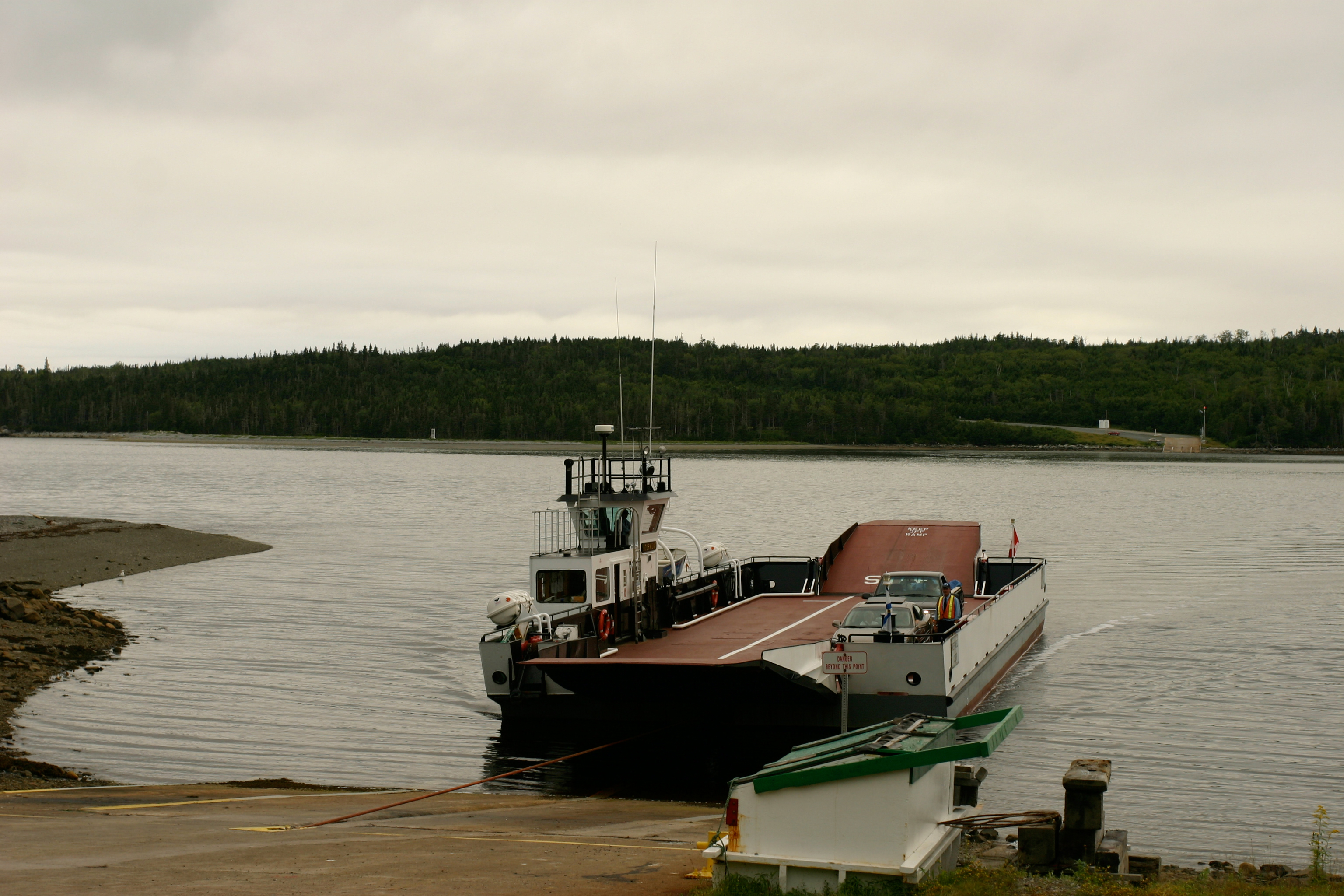
Country Harbour ferry

Country Harbour (formerly named Mocodome) is a rural community in Guysborough County, Nova Scotia, Canada. The community is situated on a large deep natural harbour of the same name and is located along the province's Eastern Shore close to Canso, Nova Scotia.

Country Harbour has several districts along Route 316:

- Country Harbour Lake
- Cross Roads Country Harbour
- Middle Country Harbour
- Country Harbour Mines

The entire population of the area is less than 1,000 permanent residents.

== History ==
Country Harbour was reportedly considered by British colonial authorities for the provincial capital and military base that was ultimately sited at Halifax. There are several sites dedicated to preserving the heritage of the early European settlers, including a restoration of a small village (probably home to less than 20 families) and Mount Misery.

Mount Misery was an early agricultural community which was renowned for its harsh winter conditions, resulting in the death of almost all original settlers within their first year of emigration. Mount Misery is connected to Country Harbour Mines via a cable ferry operated by the provincial Department of Transportation and Public Works, providing convenient access to the neighbouring community of Port Bickerton.

=== Attack at Country Harbour ===
During Father Le Loutre's War, on February 21, 1753, nine Mi'kmaq from present-day Antigonish (Nartigouneche) in canoes attacked an English vessel from Canso, Nova Scotia which had a crew of four at Country Harbour, Nova Scotia. The Mi'kmaq fired on them and drove them toward the shore. Other natives joined in and boarded the schooner, forcing them to run their vessel into an inlet. The two English men witnessed the Mi'kmaq kill and scalp two of their crew. The Mi'kmaq killed two English men and took two others captive for seven weeks. After seven weeks in captivity, on April 8, the two English men killed six Mi'kmaq and managed to escape. (Note: Patterson (1993), p. 97, reports the attack happened on the coast between Country Harbour and Tor Bay; Whitehead (1991), p. 137, reports the location was a little harbour to the westward of Torbay, "Martingo", "port of Mocodome"; Murdoch (1865), p. 410, identifies Mocodome as present-day "Country Harbour". The Mi'kmaq claimed the English schooner accidentally was shipwrecked, some of the crew drowned. They also indicated that two men died of illness while the other killed the six Mi'kmaq despite their hospitality. The French officials -who were allied with the Mi'kmaq - did not believe the Mi'kmaq account of events.)

In response, on the night of April 21, Jean-Baptiste Cope and the Mi'kmaq attacked another 10 crew English schooner in a naval battle between Outique Island and Isle Madame in which the Mi'kmaq attacked an English schooner. There were nine English men and one Acadian who was the British interpreter. The Mi'kmaq killed the English and let the Acadian named Anthony Casteel off at Port Toulouse, where the Mi'kmaq sank the schooner after looting it. Despite the collapse of peace on the eastern shore, the British did not formally renounce the Treaty of 1752 until 1756.

== Economy ==
Traditional industries have included mining, forestry and fishing. Many residents have established their fishing businesses in Port Bickerton due to the geographic advantages provided by that port, however several deep-sea fishing vessels use Country Harbour for transferring their cargo to land-based transport.

Country Harbour once had an extensive gold mining industry. However, the last serious attempt at mining this resource took place in the early 1980s with the opening of the Forest Hills Gold Mine. Nothing of significant value was recovered from this operation, and it closed after several years.

In neighbouring Goldboro, the Sable Offshore Energy Project pipeline comes ashore from natural gas fields 200 km offshore at Sable Island. There, a gas liquids separation plant operates which sends gas liquids on a pipeline to a plant at Point Tupper and the Maritimes and Northeast Pipeline carries the pure natural gas westward to markets in the Maritimes and New England.

Country Harbour has few significant employment opportunities aside from the traditional primary resource industries. Many residents tend to commute to Antigonish or even as far as New Glasgow, Port Hawkesbury and Halifax for employment, however the majority of the community is retirees.

The area is within the district of Guysborough but is served by St. Mary's Education Centre and St. Mary's Academy in nearby Sherbrooke.

== Notable residents ==
- Maria Morris Miller - painter
