= Nova Scotia Trunk 16 =

Highway in Nova Scotia, Canada

Trunk 16

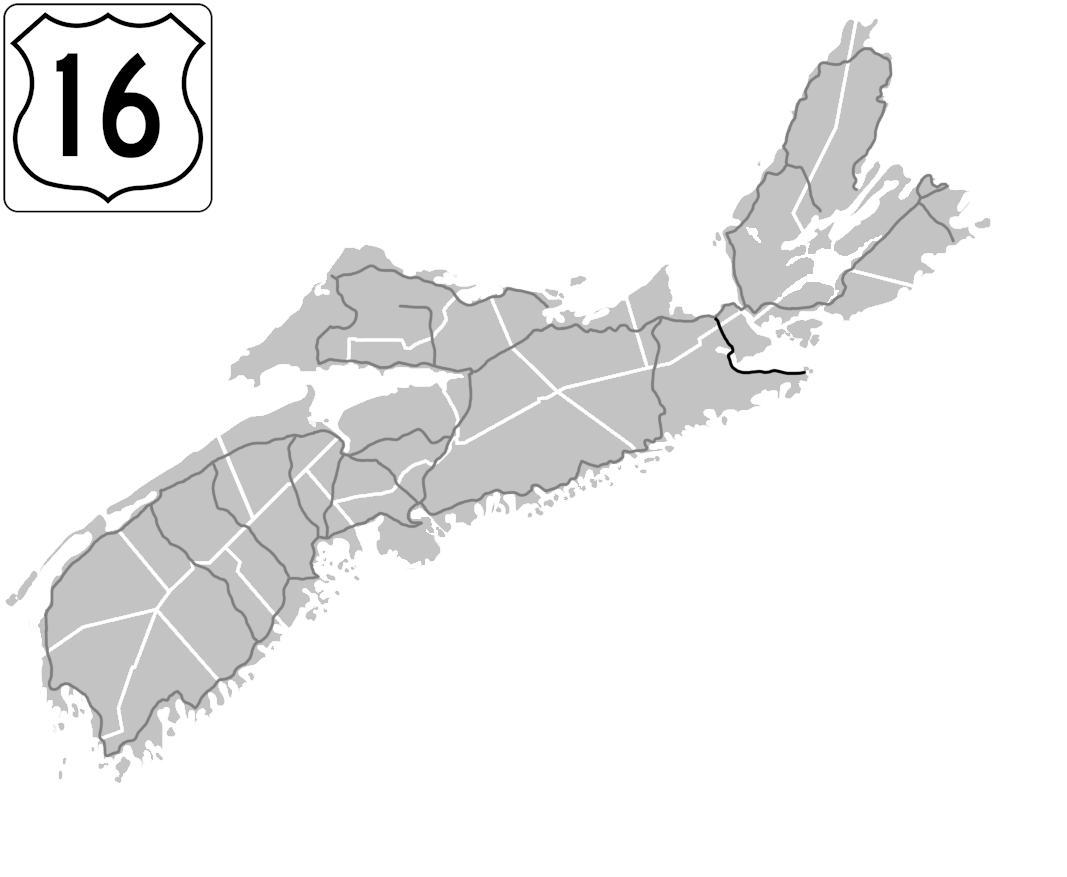

Route information
- Maintained by Department of Transportation and Infrastructure Renewal
- Length: 79.2 km (49.2 mi)

Major junctions
- West end: Trunk 4 in Monastery
- East end: Canso

Location
- Country: Canada
- Province: Nova Scotia
- Counties: Antigonish, Guysborough
- Towns: Guysborough

Highway system
- Provincial highways in Nova Scotia; 100-series
← Trunk 14	→ Trunk 19

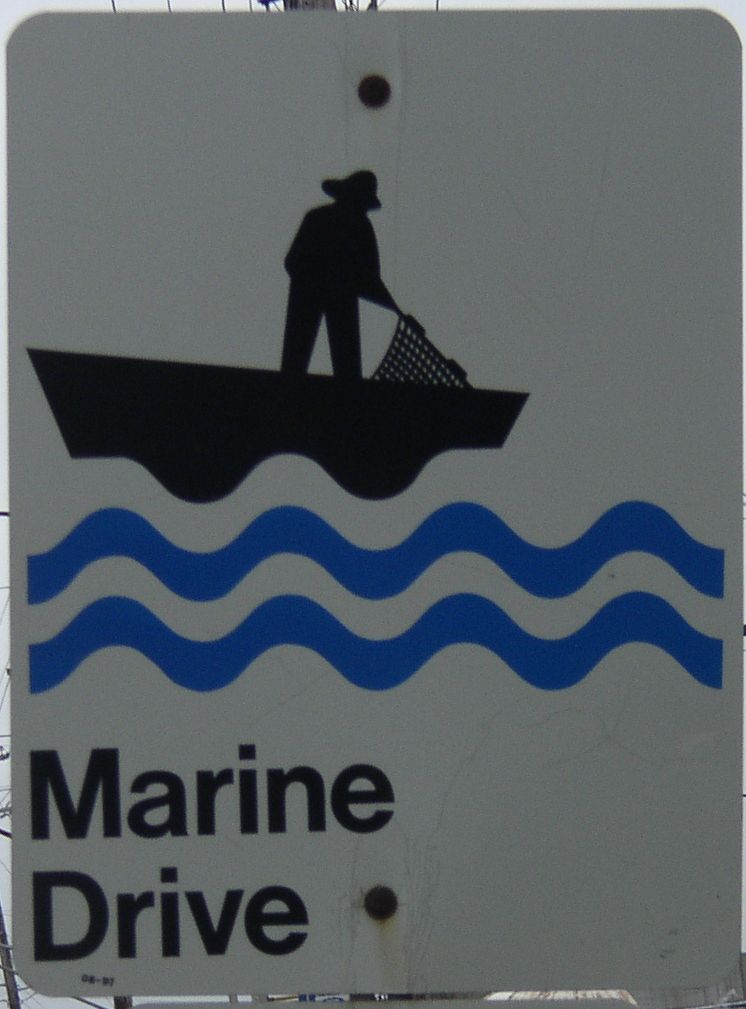
Part of Marine Drive

Trunk 16 is part of the Canadian province of Nova Scotia's system of Trunk Highways. The road runs from an intersection with Trunk 4 in Monastery to Canso, a distance of 79 kilometres (49 mi).

From Monastery, Trunk 16 follows the Tracadie River south to Boylston, where it crosses the Milford Haven River. The road then runs along the west bank of the river to its mouth at Guysborough, where it continues eastward along the coast of Chedabucto Bay to the road's end in Canso.

== Major intersections ==
County	Location	km	mi	Destinations	Notes
Antigonish	Monastery	0.0	0.0	Trunk 4 to Hwy 104 (TCH) – Antigonish, Havre Boucher, Cape Breton	Western terminus
Guysborough	Boylston	22.7	14.1	Route 344 north – Mulgrave	
Guysborough		62.9	39.1	Route 316 west – Port Felix, Goldboro, Goshen, White Head	
Guysborough	Canso	79.2	49.2	Union Street	Eastern terminus
1.000 mi = 1.609 km; 1.000 km = 0.621 mi
