= Lundy, Nova Scotia =

Community in Nova Scotia, Canada

Coordinates: 45°16′43.51″N 61°30′32.46″W

Lundy in Nova Scotia

Lundy is a small rural community in the Canadian province of Nova Scotia, located in the Municipality of the District of Guysborough in Guysborough County. It was settled by Acadians from nearby Larry's River in the late 19th century.

== History ==
Lundy was settled by the Acadian Gerroir family from nearby Larry's River in the mid 19th century. Joseph Gerroir established a roadhouse for travelers, and it remained the only building in the area for decades. Around 1900, more Acadian families from Larry's River moved to the area to harvest firewood. A school house was built in 1915. Forestry remained the primary industry of the area. The population in 1956 was 64.
