= Eastern Counties Regional Library =

- Type: Regional Public Library
- Branches: 10

Collection
- Items collected: Books, journals, newspapers, sound recordings, databases, maps, drawings

Other information
- Website: Eastern Counties Regional Library

Eastern Counties Regional Library (ECRL) is a regional public library system, providing free public library services to the counties of Guysborough, Richmond and Inverness in Nova Scotia, Canada.

The library system is governed by the Eastern Counties Regional Library Board and operates under the terms of the Nova Scotia Libraries Act. The Library Board is made up of Council Members from the six municipal units served by the Eastern Counties Regional Library System and one representative of the Province of Nova Scotia. These municipal units are the Town of Mulgrave; the Municipality of the District of Guysborough, the Municipality of the District of St. Mary's, the Town of Port Hawkesbury, Inverness County and Richmond County.

== Description ==
The Library System has ten branch library locations in Canso, Guysborough, Mabou, Margaree Forks, Mulgrave, Petit de Grat, Port Hawkesbury, Port Hood, Sherbrooke and St. Peter's. These are supplemented by mobile service sites called Libr@ry Links at Chéticamp, Inverness, Judique, St. Joseph du Moine, Mabou and Whycocomagh. The headquarters office is in Mulgrave.
