= Lower Caledonia, Nova Scotia =

Human settlement in Nova Scotia, Canada

Coordinates: 45°16′30.46″N 62°16′26.81″W

Lower Caledonia in Nova Scotia

Lower Caledonia is a small community in the Canadian province of Nova Scotia, located in the Municipality of the District of Saint Mary's in Guysborough County. The population of Lower Caledonia is unknown because it has not been included in any of the StatCan census counts.
