= Borneo, Nova Scotia =

Community in Nova Scotia, Canada

Coordinates: 45°16′52.2″N 61°54′26.18″W

Borneo in Nova Scotia

Borneo is a small community in the Canadian province of Nova Scotia, located in The Municipality of the District of Guysborough in Guysborough County.
