= Giants Lake, Nova Scotia =

Community in Nova Scotia, Canada

Coordinates: 45°23′5.81″N 61°50′51.12″W

Giants Lake in Nova Scotia

Giants Lake is a community in the Canadian province of Nova Scotia, located in the Municipality of the District of Guysborough in Guysborough County.

== History ==
The community and adjoining lake were named for its founder, Duncan McDonald, who was described as a "giant" due to his size and strength. McDonald discovered the lake in 1840 and guided the first settlers there in 1843. By 1857, there were nine families in the community. A school house was built in 1867. A post office was opened in 1895 with John McLean as postmaster. A Roman Catholic church was built by Thomas O'Neil in the early 20th century.

Economically, the community relied primarily on forestry, with some limited farming activity. The population in 1956 was 89.
