= Smithfield, Nova Scotia =

Community in Nova Scotia, Canada

Coordinates: 45°15′31.31″N 62°8′24.78″W

Smithfield in Nova Scotia

Smithfield is a small community in the Canadian province of Nova Scotia, located in the Municipality of the District of Saint Mary's in Guysborough County.
