= Glencoe, Guysborough, Nova Scotia =

Locality in Nova Scotia, Canada

Coordinates: 45°25′27.26″N 61°44′19.32″W

Glencoe in Nova Scotia

Glencoe is a locality in the Canadian province of Nova Scotia, located in the Municipality of the District of Guysborough in Guysborough County.
