= Tor Bay, Nova Scotia =

Community in Nova Scotia, Canada

Tor Bay in Nova Scotia

Tor Bay is a small fishing community in the Canadian province of Nova Scotia, located in the Municipality of the District of Guysborough in Guysborough County. It is located at the south-western end of a bay of the same name.

Basque fishermen were frequenting the area by the 1560's. The area was settled in the early 19th century.

== History ==
Captain Savalette was a fisherman from St. Jean De Luz, France, who used the shores and islands of Tor Bay to carry out his viable fishery by catching and drying his fish here during the 1500s and 1600s. He carried on his trade for many years from 1565 onward. Captain Zabaleta of Donibane Lohitzun (Saint-Jean-de-Luz) had spent 42 summers at “Port Savalet” in Nova Scotia, where Samuel de Champlain met him in 1609 and named the place in his honor.

William and Richard Gammon were among the first settlers, being granted land in 1803.By 1816 there were several houses and 30 acres of land cleared. In the 1830s, fishing vessels of between 40 and 120 tons were being built here. In 1866, a school house was built. An Anglican church was consecrated on 3 August 1905. A new Methodist church was opened in March of 1923. A postal way office was operating between 1864 and 1866, with a federal post office established in 1877.

Tor Bay was the termination site of an early transatlantic telegraph cable laid in 1875 to Ballinskelligs, Ireland—a distance of 2,565 nautical miles (4,750 km). A cable laid in 1874 connected Tor Bay to Rye Beach, New Hampshire, United States—a distance of 536 nautical miles (993 km). In 1874, the Direct United States Cable Company landed at Tor Bay, Guysborough County, Nova Scotia. Known as the Faraday Station, and only some thirty miles from Canso; it operated until 1887.

In 1956, the population of the community was 83.

== Attractions ==
=== Tor Bay Provincial Park ===
A picnic area on a rocky point looking out to the open Atlantic, 8 km (5 mi) south of Larry's River. Sweeping sand beaches; boardwalks and interpretive displays describing natural environment as well as historical significance of this site as landing point for first trans-Atlantic cable.

=== Place Savalette ===
A designated Parks Canada National Historic Site Monument, Place Savalette is located in Port Felix and is recognized as a pioneering location of the “dry fishery” in Acadia. Acadians of the area celebrate Festival Savalette August 5th-8th every year.
