= Crows Nest, Nova Scotia =

Community in Nova Scotia, Canada

Coordinates: 45°15′1.29″N 62°4′7.24″W

Crows Nest in Nova Scotia

Crows Nest is a community in the Canadian province of Nova Scotia, located in the Municipality of the District of Saint Mary's in Guysborough County.
