= Jordanville =

Jordanville may refer to:

- Jordanville railway station, Melbourne, Australia
- Jordanville, New York, a community in Herkimer County
- Jordanville, Nova Scotia, Canada
- Jordanville, former community in North Carolina centered on conjure doctor Jim Jordan
- A metonym for Holy Trinity Monastery near Jordanville, New York
