= South Lochaber, Nova Scotia =

Community in Nova Scotia, Canada

Coordinates: 45°22′40.64″N 62°2′57.87″W

South Lochaber in Nova Scotia

South Lochaber (Loch Abar a Deas) is a small community in the Canadian province of Nova Scotia, located in the Municipality of the District of Saint Mary's in Guysborough County.
