= Forest Hill, Guysborough, Nova Scotia =

Community in Nova Scotia, Canada

Coordinates: 45°17′54.81″N 61°45′45.84″W

Forest Hill in Nova Scotia

Forest Hill is a former community in the Canadian province of Nova Scotia, located in the Municipality of the District of Guysborough in Guysborough County. The economy was focused on gold mining.

== History ==
Gold was discovered by Samuel D. Hudson in 1893. By 1896, a village was growing at the site of the discovery. There were three gold stamp mills, two or three general stores, and a school house. The population at the time was about two or three hundred people. After five or six years, mining activity slowed, but picked up again from 1907 to 1909 when new deposits were discovered. Mining was carried out again from 1939 to 1942. By 1950, no inhabitants remained.
