= Alder River, Nova Scotia =

Community in Nova Scotia, Canada

Coordinates: 45°29′6.61″N 61°43′53.99″W

Alder River in Nova Scotia

Alder River is an unincorporated community in the Canadian province of Nova Scotia, located in the Municipality of the District of Guysborough in Guysborough County. Its name is descriptive, referring to a prominent stand of alders along the river in the community.

The first of the land grants in the area was provided to John Gschwindt and Isabella Ellis in 1812. The Anglican church received a grant in the area in 1813.
