= Erinville, Nova Scotia =

Community in Nova Scotia, Canada

Coordinates: 45°22′16.33″N 61°44′10.05″W

Erinville in Nova Scotia

Erinville is a rural community in the Canadian province of Nova Scotia, located in the Municipality of the District of Guysborough in Guysborough County. The community was settled in the early 19th century by primarily Irish settlers.

== History ==
Land in the area was first granted in 1813 to Thomas Cutler and his son Robert M. Cutler, both prominent citizens of Guysborough. In 1817, land was granted to Duncan McColl and George Mitchell, both merchants from Halifax. The first settlers were E. Kelly, James Sullivan, and a Mr. Fitzgerald. These settlers arrived in October 1823, and the settlement was first known as the "North West Branch Settlement". A log chapel was built in the area sometime between 1824 and 1836. A log school house was built around 1863, and a new school was opened in September 1923. A postal way office was established 1 August 1867, With Charles Kenny as postmaster. Throughout the community's history, farming and forestry have been the primary industries. The population was 98 in 1956.
