= Glenelg, Nova Scotia =

Community in Nova Scotia, Canada

Coordinates: 45°15′39.57″N 62°4′42.93″W

Glenelg in Nova Scotia

Glenelg (Scottish Gaelic: Gleann Eilg) is a small community in the Canadian province of Nova Scotia, located in the Municipality of the District of Saint Mary's in Guysborough County.
