= Cameron Settlement, Nova Scotia =

Community in Nova Scotia, Canada

Coordinates: 45°16′57.42″N 62°26′49.11″W

Cameron Settlement in Nova Scotia

Cameron Settlement is a small community in the Canadian province of Nova Scotia, located in the Municipality of the District of Saint Mary's in Guysborough County.
