= South Merland, Nova Scotia =

Community in Nova Scotia, Canada

Coordinates: 45°32′35.33″N 61°37′58.65″W

South Merland in Nova Scotia

South Merland is a small community in the Canadian province of Nova Scotia, located in the Municipality of the District of Guysborough in Guysborough County.
