= Roachvale, Nova Scotia =

Community in Nova Scotia, Canada

Coordinates: 45°21′13.8″N 61°32′52.75″W

Roachvale in Nova Scotia

Roachvale is a small community in the Canadian province of Nova Scotia, located in the Municipality of the District of Guysborough in Guysborough County.
