= St. Marys River, Nova Scotia =

Community in Nova Scotia, Canada

Coordinates: 45°4′52.93″N 61°55′59.19″W

St. Marys River in Nova Scotia

St. Marys River is a small community in the Canadian province of Nova Scotia, located in the Municipality of the District of Saint Mary's in Guysborough County. It is named after the river of the same name.
