= Eastern Counties =

Eastern Counties may refer to various companies, services and organizations serving the East of England:

- First Eastern Counties, English bus operating company formerly known as Eastern Counties Omnibus Company, now as First Norfolk & Suffolk
- Eastern Counties Football League, football league in eastern England
- Eastern Counties Railway, English rail company which became part of the Great Eastern Railway in 1862
- Eastern Counties Regional Library, public library system in Canada
- Eastern Counties Rugby Union, a rugby union governing body and rugby team in England
  - Eastern Counties 1, an English level 9 Rugby Union League
- Archant, newspaper publishing company in eastern England known as Eastern Counties Newspapers until 2002
- National Union of Agricultural and Allied Workers, former trade union in the United Kingdom initially known as the Eastern Counties Agricultural Labourers & Small Holders Union
