= Nova Scotia Route 276 =

Highway in Nova Scotia, Canada

Route 276

Route information
- Maintained by Nova Scotia Department of Transportation and Infrastructure Renewal
- Length: 5 km (3.1 mi)

Major junctions
- West end: Trunk 7 in South Lochaber
- East end: Route 316 in Goshen

Location
- Country: Canada
- Province: Nova Scotia
- Counties: Guysborough

Highway system
- Provincial highways in Nova Scotia; 100-series
← Route 256	→ Route 277

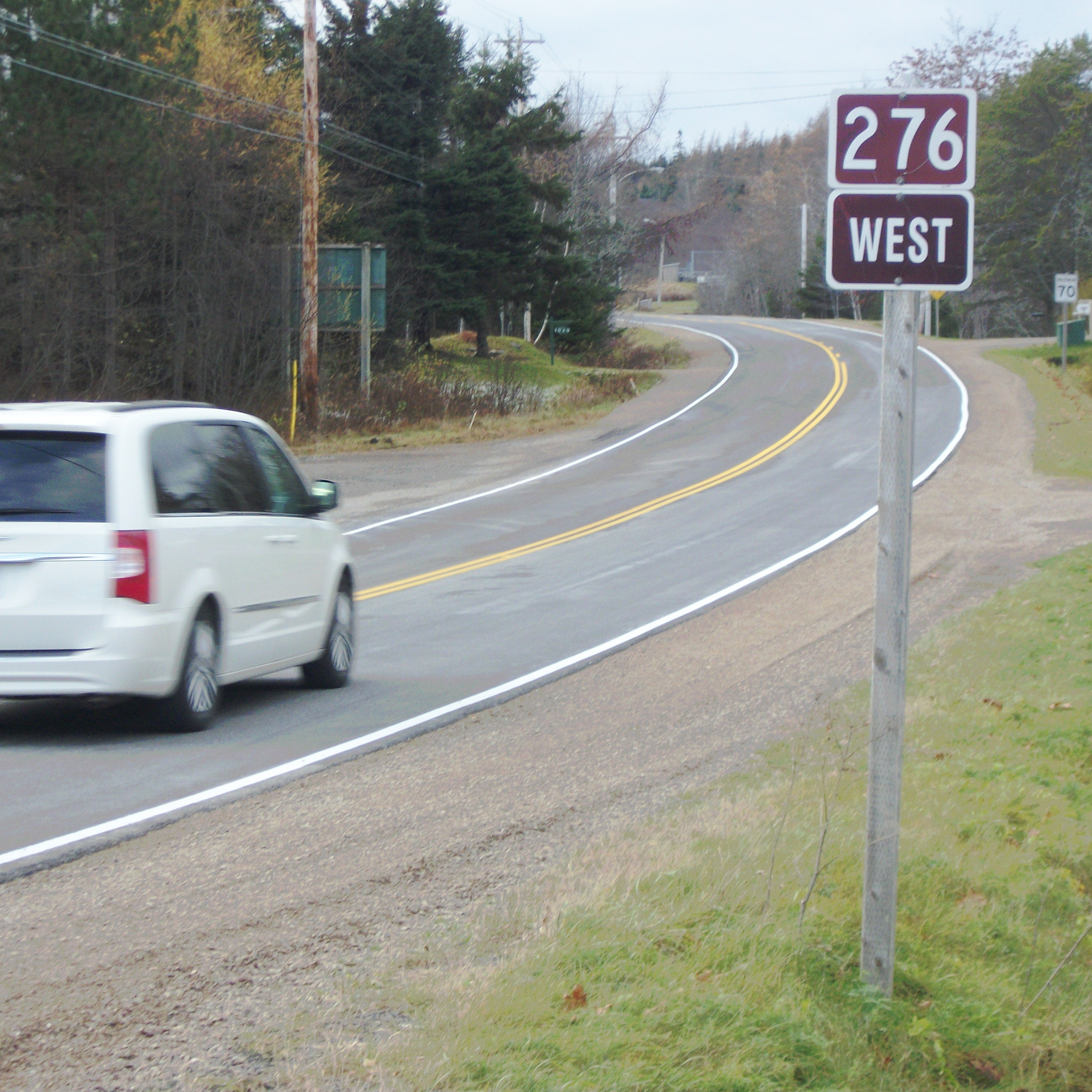
Route sign in Goshen, Guysborough County, Nova Scotia

Route 276 is a short collector road in the Canadian province of Nova Scotia. It is located in Guysborough County and connects South Lochaber at Trunk 7 with Goshen at Route 316.

== Communities ==
- South Lochaber
- Goshen

== Parks ==
- Lochiel Lake Provincial Park
