= Country Harbour Lake, Nova Scotia =

Community in Nova Scotia, Canada

Coordinates: 45°18′37.62″N 61°55′10.98″W

Country Harbour Lake, in Nova Scotia

Country Harbour Lake is a small community in the Canadian province of Nova Scotia, located in the Municipality of the District of Saint Mary's in Guysborough County.
