= Little Dover, Nova Scotia =

Community in Nova Scotia, Canada

Coordinates: 45°17′10.9″N 61°2′45.15″W

Little Dover in Nova Scotia

Little Dover is a community in the Canadian province of Nova Scotia, founded in 1860 and located in The Municipality of the District of Guysborough in Guysborough County.
