= Spanish Ship Bay, Nova Scotia =

Community in Nova Scotia, Canada

Coordinates: 45°1′38″N 62°1′40″W

Spanish Ship Bay in Nova Scotia

Spanish Ship Bay is a small community in the Canadian province of Nova Scotia, located in the Municipality of the District of St. Mary's in Guysborough County.

== Etymology ==
Spanish Ship Bay is said to have been so named because a Spanish galleon had run aground there, or because a headland nearby is shaped somewhat like a ship.
