= Goshen, Nova Scotia =

Community in Nova Scotia, Canada

Coordinates: 45°22′26″N 61°58′17″W

Goshen in Nova Scotia

Goshen is a community in the Canadian province of Nova Scotia, located in Guysborough County.

The community is approximately 30 km south of Antigonish, 30 km north of Sherbrooke and 30 km west of Guysborough on Route 316.

Its economy is tied to farming and forestry.

== Demographics ==
- Total Population - 395
- Total Dwellings - 214
- Total Land Area - 544.511 km^{2}

== Communications ==
- The Postal Code is B0H 1M0
- The Telephone exchange is 902-783
- Television - CBC Channel 2 - 9 kW
- Television - CTV Channel 12 kW
