= Middle Country Harbour, Nova Scotia =

Community in Nova Scotia, Canada

Coordinates: 45°14′8.21″N 61°45′45.22″W

Middle Country Harbour in Nova Scotia

Middle Country Harbour is a community in the Canadian province of Nova Scotia, located in the Municipality of the District of Guysborough in Guysborough County.
