= Harpellville, Nova Scotia =

Community in Nova Scotia, Canada

Coordinates: 45°6′41.66″N 61°46′30.95″W

Harpellville in Nova Scotia

Harpellville is a small community in the Canadian province of Nova Scotia, located in the Municipality of the District of Saint Mary's in Guysborough County. The community was formerly known as 'Indian River'.
