= Marie Joseph, Nova Scotia =

Community in Nova Scotia, Canada

Coordinates: 44°58′19.51″N 62°4′57.14″W

Marie Joseph in Nova Scotia

Marie Joseph is a small fishing community in the Canadian province of Nova Scotia, located in the Municipality of the District of Saint Mary's in Guysborough County. Marie Joseph Provincial Park is located in the community.
