= Eight Island Lake, Nova Scotia =

Community in Nova Scotia, Canada

Coordinates: 45°21′42.9″N 61°56′47.39″W

Eight Island Lake in Nova Scotia

Eight Island Lake is a small community in the Canadian province of Nova Scotia, located in the Municipality of the District of St. Mary's in Guysborough County.
