= Argyle, Guysborough County, Nova Scotia =

Community in Nova Scotia, Canada

Coordinates: 45°23′2.88″N 61°56′27.61″W

Argyle in Nova Scotia

Argyle is an unincorporated community in the Canadian province of Nova Scotia, located in the Municipality of the District of Saint Mary's in Guysborough County. The name of the community is of Scottish origin and is attributed to the early settler Duncan McIntosh, who immigrated to Nova Scotia from Scotland in 1843. He brought with him four sons and three daughters. A schoolhouse was built in Argyle sometime before 1865.
