= Sonora, Nova Scotia =

Community in Nova Scotia, Canada

Coordinates: 45°3′41″N 61°53′55″W

Sonora in Nova Scotia

Sonora is a small fishing and mining community in the Canadian province of Nova Scotia, located in the Municipality of the District of St. Mary's in Guysborough County.
