= Fox Island Main, Nova Scotia =

Community in Nova Scotia, Canada

Coordinates: 45°20′10.39″N 61°7′3.47″W

Fox Island Main in Nova Scotia

Fox Island Main is a small community in the Canadian province of Nova Scotia, located in the Municipality of the District of Guysborough in Guysborough County.
