= Cross Roads Country Harbour =

Community in Nova Scotia, Canada

Coordinates: 45°16′39.59″N 61°53′3.99″W

Cross Roads Country Harbour in Nova Scotia

Cross Roads Country Harbour is a community in the Canadian province of Nova Scotia, located in the Municipality of the District of Guysborough in Guysborough County.

In 1753 there was the attack at Country Harbour, Nova Scotia.

Country Harbour once had an extensive gold mining industry. However, the last serious attempt at mining this resource took place in the early 1980s with the opening of the Forest Hills Gold Mine. Nothing of significant value was recovered from this operation, and it closed after several years.
