= Philips Harbour, Nova Scotia =

Community in Nova Scotia, Canada

Coordinates: 45°20′53.17″N 61°14′9.87″W

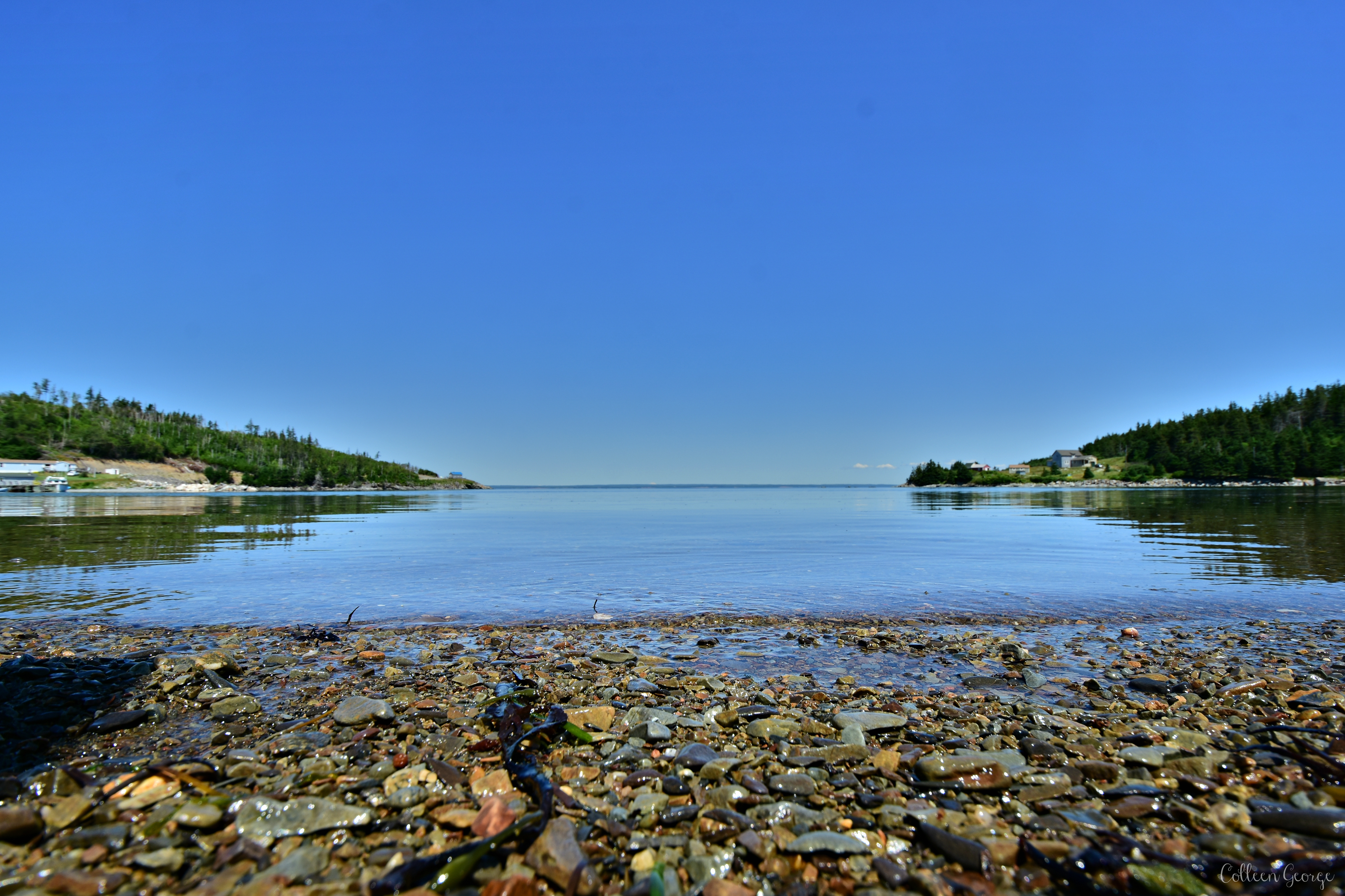
Looking towards the harbour entrance.

Phillips Harbour in Nova Scotia

Phillips Harbour is a small community in the Canadian province of Nova Scotia, located in The Municipality of the District of Guysborough in Guysborough County.
