= Roman Valley, Nova Scotia =

Community in Nova Scotia, Canada

Coordinates: 45°27′18.26″N 61°44′41.26″W

Roman Valley in Nova Scotia

Roman Valley is an unincorporated community in the Canadian province of Nova Scotia, located in Guysborough County. The name of the community was likely given by early Irish settlers.

In 1829, a land grant in the area was provided to John and Thomas Rogers, John Devereaux, and Patrick Doucie; by 1857, the community was considerably established.
