= Steep Creek, Nova Scotia =

Community in Nova Scotia, Canada

Coordinates: 45°32′53.51″N 61°20′9.54″W

Steep Creek in Nova Scotia

Steep Creek is a small community in the Canadian province of Nova Scotia, located in the Municipality of the District of Guysborough in Guysborough County. Located along the Strait of Canso which is the body of water separating mainland Nova Scotia from Cape Breton Island. The Canso Strait is the deepest ice free port in North America. Steep Creek borders on the communities of Pitate Harbour on one side and Melford on the other.
