= Whitehead, Nova Scotia =

Human settlement in Canada

Coordinates: 45°14′3″N 61°11′7″W

Whitehead in Nova Scotia

Whitehead is a rural community in the Canadian province of Nova Scotia, located in the Municipality of the District of Guysborough in Guysborough County.

As of 2011 the population of Whitehead consists of between 50 and 120 people. The location and geography of Whitehead is very typical of a coastal fishing village, in that it has various large rockformations and many small islands surrounding it. The harbour is protected by islands and points extending out into the bay from either side. Whitehead experiences large amounts of fog due to its relative location. Each year during the second week in August the annual Whitehead Days festival is held, with a parade, games for children, a beer garden, and many other attractions.

== History ==
Whitehead was first settled in the early 19th century. The first settler was Moses Cohoon from Queens County in 1818. The following year Thomas Munroe, John Munroe, and Robert Spears arrived from Shelburne. In 1820 William Demmings also came from Shelburne and a Mr. Coiffin and Mr. Duff arrived from Tusket. A lighthouse was built at the entrance to the harbour in 1854. In 1856, a postal way office was established. A school house was built in 1868, being replaced by another school house in 1893. A second school was built in 1905.

Fishing has always been the primary industry. A commercial wharf was constructed in 1875, and the Tor Bay Canning Company built a processing plant at Whitehead in the early 1950's. The population of the area was 291 in 1956.
