= Sand Point, Guysborough County =

Community in Nova Scotia, Canada

Coordinates: 45°31′2.69″N 61°15′21.56″W

Sand Point in Nova Scotia

Sand Point is a community in the Canadian province of Nova Scotia, located in Guysborough County .
