= Drum Head, Nova Scotia =

Community in Nova Scotia, Canada

Coordinates: 45°8′57.04″N 61°36′1.85″W

Drum Head in Nova Scotia

Drum Head is a community in the Canadian province of Nova Scotia, located in the Municipality of the District of Guysborough in Guysborough County.
