= Cole Harbour, Guysborough County, Nova Scotia =

Community in Nova Scotia, Canada

Coordinates: 45°15′57.84″N 61°15′37.01″W

Cole Harbour in Nova Scotia

Cole Harbour is a community in the Canadian province of Nova Scotia, located in Guysborough County.

== History ==
While it is uncertain when or for whom it was named, Cole Harbour was first settled in 1817 by George Tanner and William West. George Tanner of Lunenburg married widow Mary (Rhynold) Myers of Peas Brook on December 5, 1814 and moved to Cole Harbour in 1817 where they were later joined by her sisters Ann (Mrs. James Harrington) and Elizabeth (Mrs. Louis Uloth). These three pioneer women of Cole Harbour died within a month of each other in 1870, all over eighty years of age. While little record of William West has been found, he deserves to share the honour of being a founding father along with George Tanner.

Like Tor Bay, Whitehead, Country Harbour, etc., the name Cole Harbour seems to be older than the settlement. Dr. A.C. Jost suggests it may have been named for Captain Cole of the sloop William which was captured in the vicinity by a Spanish privateer in 1719. Another theory is that it was named for an early fisherman who based his operation here.

While Cole Harbour, Guysborough County is often confused with Cole Harbour near Halifax, this may not have always been the case. Plan #55a in the Crown Land Office in Halifax shows Guysborough County's Cole Harbour as Coal Harbour, suggesting the name could have originally been Coal instead of Cole. It may be possible provincial authorities were trying to change its name so as not to confuse the two Cole Harbours. Map #55a also shows George Tanner's original land grant with the notation "Geo Tanner & others". These others may have been Jasper Grover who received a land grant here in 1856, William Myers in 1859 and James Munroe in 1860.

Cole Harbour appears on the Des Barres Atlantic Neptune Map (done in the late 1760s) as Durham Inlet. Des Barres was in the habit of naming places for those in high office, probably hoping to gain favour. So the use of this name does not necessarily mean it was not named Cole or Coal Harbour at this date.
