= Charlos Cove, Nova Scotia =

Community in Nova Scotia, Canada

Charlos Cove
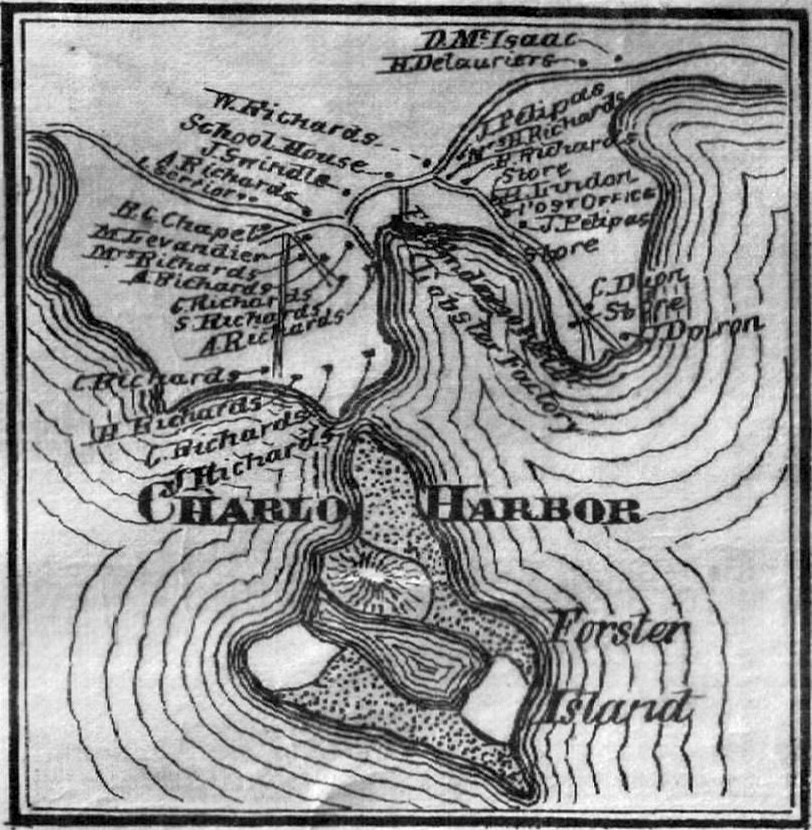
- Map of Charlo Harbour (Charlos Cove) made in 1876 by A.F. Church.
- Coordinates: 45°14′47″N 61°20′10″W
- Country: Canada
- Province: Nova Scotia
- Municipality: Municipality of the District of Guysborough
- Time zone: UTC-4 (AST)
  - Summer (DST): UTC-3 (ADT)
- GNBC Code: CAGWB

Charlos Cove is a small community in Guysborough County, Nova Scotia, Canada. It is administratively part of the Municipality of the District of Guysborough. The community was first settled by Acadians in the aftermath of the Acadian Expulsion. It is named for one of the first settlers, Charles Richard.

== Geography ==
Charlos Cove is located on the north side of Tor Bay.

== History ==
Charlos Cove was founded following the Acadian Expulsion. Seeking remote places away from British oversight, the first Acadian settlers came to Charlos Cove in the 1760s. Settlers Charles Richard, Joseph Richard, Oliver Flemming, and John Avery made petitions for land grants in 1799. A survey was conducted on 20 May 1800 and shows houses and buildings owned by the settlers on un-granted land. Another survey was conducted in 1809. The settlers relied on the sea for transportation and livelihood.

A postal way office was established in 1869, with Henry Lyndon as postmaster. St. Joseph's Roman Catholic Church was built in 1876 and is the centre of the community. The first school house was built in 1879, and in 1920 a two-room school was built, which is today used as the parish hall. The population in 1956 was 235.
