= Half Island Cove, Nova Scotia =

Community in Nova Scotia, Canada

Coordinates: 45°19′55.62″N 61°11′0.77″W

Half Island Cove in Nova Scotia

Half Island Cove is a community in the Canadian province of Nova Scotia, located in the Municipality of the District of Guysborough in Guysborough County.

The beach at Half Island Cove is one of the warmest beaches in Nova Scotia.
