= Country Harbour Mines, Nova Scotia =

Community in Nova Scotia, Canada

Coordinates: 45°14′56.07″N 61°48′12.61″W

Country Harbour Mines in Nova Scotia

Country Harbour Mines is a community in the Canadian province of Nova Scotia, located in the Municipality of the District of Guysborough in Guysborough County.
