= Halfway Cove, Nova Scotia =

Community in Nova Scotia, Canada

Coordinates: 45°20′50.35″N 61°22′15.61″W

Halfway Cove in Nova Scotia

Halfway Cove is a small community in the Canadian province of Nova Scotia, located in The Municipality of the District of Guysborough in Guysborough County. The community is best known for its monument to Henry Sinclair's purported discovery of North America.

== History ==
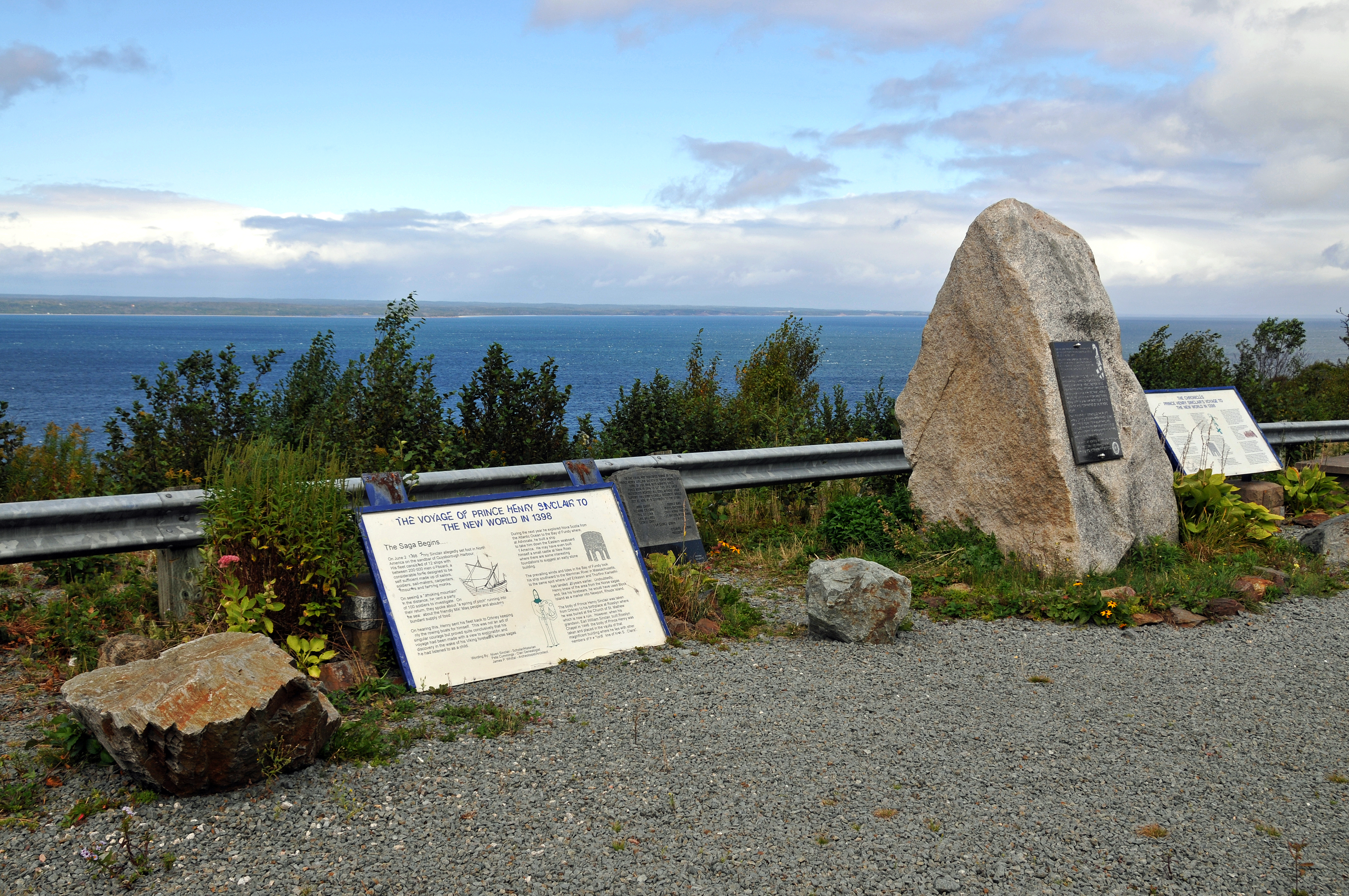
Monument to the landing of the Henry Sinclair Expedition, Halfway Cove, Nova Scotia

The Prince Henry Sinclair Society of North America believe he landed at Chedabucto Bay in 1398. A monument was erected in Halfway Cove on November 17, 1996. It is a fifteen-ton granite boulder with a black granite narrative plaque.
