= Jordanville, Nova Scotia =

Community in Nova Scotia, Canada

Coordinates: 45°8′45.49″N 61°54′30.2″W

Jordanville in Nova Scotia

Jordanville is a small community in the Canadian province of Nova Scotia, located in the Municipality of the District of Saint Mary's in Guysborough County.
