= Coddles Harbour, Nova Scotia =

Community in Nova Scotia, Canada

Coordinates: 45°10′4.58″N 61°32′18.76″W

Coddles Harbour in Nova Scotia

Coddles Harbour is a community in the Canadian province of Nova Scotia, located in the Municipality of the District of Guysborough in Guysborough County.
