= St. Mary's River (Nova Scotia) =

River in Nova Scotia, Canada

- Location of mouth

Location
- Country: Canada
- Province: Nova Scotia

Physical characteristics
- Mouth: Atlantic Ocean
  - coordinates: 45°6′19.4″N 61°57′54.7″W
  - elevation: sea level
- Length: 250 km (160 mi)
- Basin size: 1,350 km^{2} (520 sq mi)
- Discharge
  - average: 45.6 m^{3}/s (1,610 cu ft/s)

The St. Mary's River is a river in the Canadian province of Nova Scotia. At approximately 250 kilometres (160 mi), it is one of Nova Scotia's longest rivers. It runs through Guysborough County, Antigonish County, Halifax Regional Municipality, Colchester County and Pictou County of Nova Scotia and drains into the Atlantic Ocean at Sonora, Nova Scotia. The river drains an area of approximately 1,350 square kilometres (520 sq mi) and has four branches; the West, East, North and Main. It offers important Atlantic salmon habitat and the riverbanks are a habitat for the wood turtle.

There are an estimated 130 lakes in the St. Mary's watershed, ranging in size from less than 5 hectares (12 acres) to 3 square kilometres (1.2 sq mi) (Lochaber Lake). The largest lakes, all on the East and North branches, are the Lochaber, Lochiel, Eden and Archibald's Mills Lakes.

Named Rivère Isle Verte by explorer Samuel de Champlain, the current name is from Fort Saint Marie, a French-built fort which was later taken over and destroyed by the British. There was also a Fort Saint Charles on the river nearby; both were 17th century forts. Atlantic salmon, an endangered species, inhabit the river. There are efforts under way by the Nova Scotia Nature Trust to protect ecologically important lands along the river.

== See also ==
- List of rivers of Nova Scotia
