= Larrys River, Nova Scotia =

Community in Nova Scotia, Canada

Coordinates: 45°13′18.16″N 61°22′57.63″W

Larrys River in Nova Scotia

Larrys River is a small community in the Canadian province of Nova Scotia, located in the Municipality of the District of Guysborough in Guysborough County. The community is named after one of its settlers, Larry Keating. Settlers arrived from Chezzetcook soon after the expulsion ended in 1763.

== Parks ==
- Tor Bay Provincial Park
