= Port Felix, Nova Scotia =

Community in Nova Scotia, Canada

Coordinates: 45°14′57.59″N 61°13′5.6″W

Port Felix in Nova Scotia

Port Felix is a small community in the Canadian province of Nova Scotia, located in the Municipality of the District of Guysborough in Guysborough County.

== Geography ==
Surrounded by islands such as Goat of Burying Island, Potato Island, Sheep Island, Hog Island, Tanner Island and Ebber Island; it is situated on the eastern shore of Guysborough County, 22 km from Canso.

== History ==
Up until 1869, Port Felix, Guysborough County, was originally known as Molasses Harbour. Early Acadian settlers named it because a keg of molasses washed up on shore. The early Acadian settlers arrived about 1797 from Chezzetcook, where they had been living since about 1758 after the fall of Louisbourg. Following the American Revolution, many Loyalists flocked to Nova Scotia, and the Acadian settlers were refused land grants in the Chezzetcook area, so many left that area, traveling down the eastern shore and settling in Molasses Harbour (Port Felix), Charlos Cove and Larry's River. Port Felix is scenic, with its harbour and rugged coastline.
