= Sherbrooke, Nova Scotia =

Community in Nova Scotia, Canada

Sherbrooke
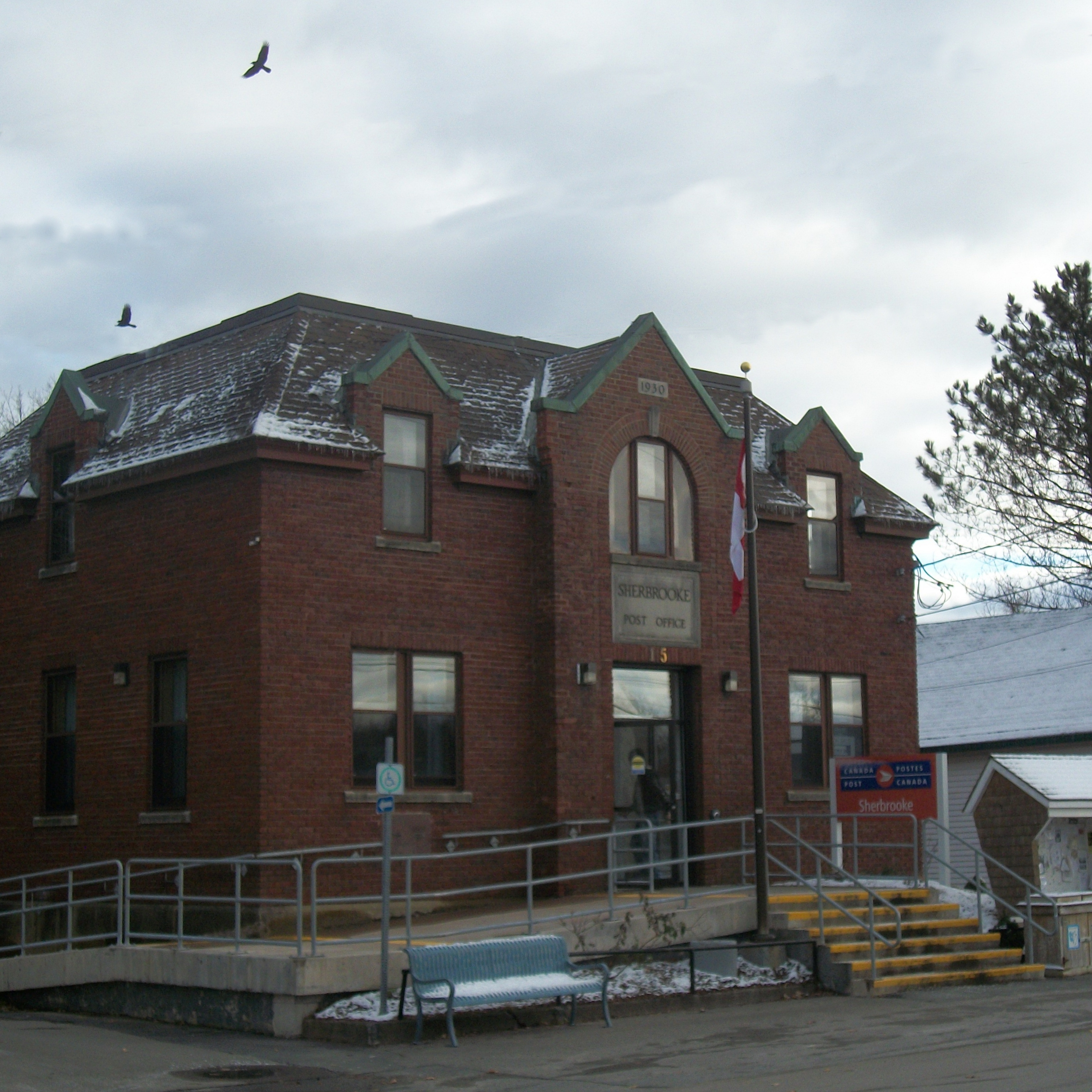
- The Sherbrooke post office, built in 1930.

- Location within Nova Scotia
- Coordinates: 45°8′N 61°59′W
- Country: Canada
- Province: Nova Scotia
- County: Guysborough County
- District Municipality: Municipality of the District of St. Mary's
- Founded: 1805

Population
  - Estimate (2020): 400
- Time zone: UTC−04:00 (AST)
  - Summer (DST): UTC−03:00 (ADT)
- GNBC Code: CBILO
- Highways: Trunk 7
- Website: www.saint-marys.ca
- Part of a series about Places in Nova Scotia

Sherbrooke is an unincorporated community on the Eastern Shore of Nova Scotia, Canada, in Guysborough County. It is located along the St. Mary's River, a major river in Nova Scotia. The community is named for Sir John Coape Sherbrooke, a colonial era Lieutenant Governor of Nova Scotia. Gold was discovered in the area in 1861 and Sherbrooke entered a gold rush which lasted two decades. The economy of the community today revolves around fishing, tourism and lumber. The community is the site of an open-air museum called "Sherbrooke Village" which depicts life in the later 1800s in the wake of the gold rush era.

== Geography ==
Sherbrooke is nestled between Sherbrooke Lake and St. Mary's River. The river was named for Fort Sainte-Marie, a French-built fort which was later taken over and destroyed by the British, and is renowned for its angling and its run of wild Atlantic salmon. Over the past decades the population of Atlantic salmon has decreased dramatically, and fishing of Atlantic salmon is strictly prohibited, as is catch and release.

Land resources are constrained by the bedrock, which is hard, nutrient-poor quartzite. The soils that have developed on this rock around Sherbrooke are mostly mapped as Halifax series, which are non-arable due to their excessive stoniness, droughtiness, low fertility and strong acidity. Sherbrooke itself is largely built on deep sands and gravels of the Hebert series, which is for the most part marginally arable. The soils in and around Sherbrooke are more valuable for forestry than for agriculture. The bedrock had enough gold to support mining operations in the late 19th and early 20th centuries, but mining ceased soon after and a precipitous population decline was noted by 1921.

The St. Mary's River is home to hundreds of different wildlife species, from the smallest insects to the many different predators. The St. Mary's River has a length of over 200 km (120 mi) and has three main branches, the east branch, the west branch, and the north branch. The branch feeds into the main river located by Sherbrooke, which then empties into the Atlantic Ocean. The St. Mary's River is home to the famous Atlantic Salmon, but as listed above they are no longer allowed to be fished due to their critically low population.

The river is also home to bald eagles which make their home on old dead trees along the St. Mary's River, because of the food that await in the water below. If you are lucky, you may get to see one perched on an old tree as you drive along the St. Mary's River. Other common birds to see along the river are Osprey, Great-horned owls, and a wide range of hawks. Another resident of the St. Mary's River is the wood turtle, which is a protected species. Surveys have been done along the St. Mary's River to learn the wood turtle population, their diet, habitat, and breeding grounds. A common species of fish to see in the river and its many estuaries is the Speckled Brook Trout, which as makes its home in sheltered waters and underneath logs that have fallen in the brooks. The brook trout is also a food source for many of the birds along the St. Mary's River.

== History ==
Charles Baye de La Giraudière established a fort along the banks of the St. Mary's River in 1650, named Fort Sainte-Marie. The fort was captured by the British in 1669. James Fisher and his three sons from New Hampshire were among the first settlers of the community in 1805. The community is named in honour of Sir John Coape Sherbrooke, a colonial era Lieutenant-Governor of Nova Scotia. A schoolhouse was established in the community in 1815 and by 1818, two sawmills, a gristmill and a post office were present in the community, along with about twenty houses. A jail was opened in the community in 1827 and a courthouse was established in the community in 1858. A Presbyterian meeting house was established in the community in 1832. St. James' Anglican Church was built in the community in 1850 and was consecrated on August 15, 1885. St. Paul's Roman Catholic Church, built in nearby Goldenville in 1871, was moved to Sherbrooke in 1907. Two new schoolhouses were built in 1850s and 1860s respectively.

Gold was discovered in the area in 1861. Sherbrooke and surrounding communities benefited from one of several gold rushes. Miners came from all over Canada and the United States to stake a claim in the gold of the Sherbrooke area. Goldenville, being the most popular for miners, was a boom town. Previously as populous as it is today, in a very short time it grew to many times its previous size. The gold rush lasted about 20 years.

Mining was revived in the 20th century, but it did not achieve the success of previous operations. Following the gold rush era, the economy for the area turned from gold mining to fishing, tourism, and lumber. St. Mary's Memorial Hospital was opened on September 28, 1949 and St. Mary's Rural High School opened on November 14, 1953.

== Amenities ==
Sherbrooke has an RCMP detachment, a Nova Scotia Liquor Commission store, and St. Mary's Memorial Hospital, which serves the District of St. Mary's. Saint Marys Education Centre/Academy (SMECA) is located in Sherbrooke. It serves grades primary-12 and covers the entirety of St. Mary's. The school was constructed in 2013, from the amalgamation of St. Mary's Academy (SMA) and St. Mary's Education Centre (SMEC).

=== Sherbrooke Village ===
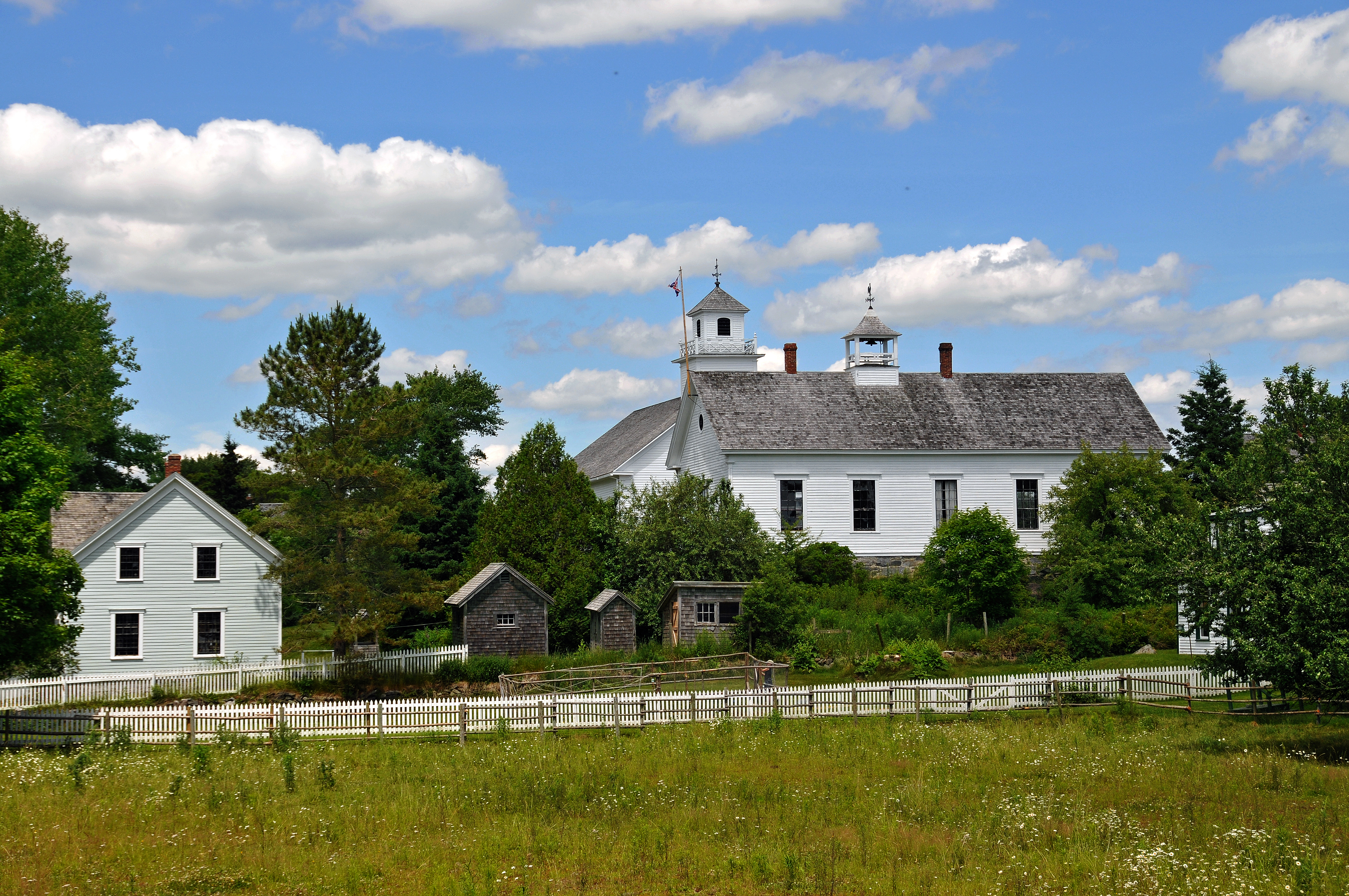
Sherbrooke Village

Sherbrooke is the site of a regional heritage site and tourist attraction known as Sherbrooke Village, an open-air museum depicting village life in the late 19th century. Founded in 1969 and part of the Nova Scotia Museum system, Sherbrooke Village employs a significant number of local residents, estimated to around 100 full-time and seasonal workers. There are approximately 30 historic buildings including a working blacksmith shop, a pottery shop, a water powered lumber mill, which is located off site, a tea room (restaurant), and several animal barns which contain sheep, horses, cow, chickens, turkeys, and peafowl or peacocks. It also has an Ambrotype photo studio which has operated continuously each summer since 1976. Sherbrooke village is the largest component of the Nova Scotia Museum complex. It is open in the summer months from June to October and at select times during the rest of the year.

Around the end of November there is a Christmas tree lighting called "An Old Fashioned Christmas" that takes place in the Village. After the tree is lit, a walk down the main street of Sherbrooke follows; this leads down through Sherbrooke Village towards the ball field. Local groups throughout the St. Mary's Municipality decorate the doors of the buildings in the village. A community group also decorates the remaining parts of Sherbrooke Village.
