= Goldboro =

Community in Nova Scotia, Canada

Coordinates: 45°10′57.2″N 61°38′43.9″W

Goldboro in Nova Scotia

Goldboro is a Canadian rural community in Guysborough County, Nova Scotia. Located on the Eastern Shore along Route 316, Goldboro is approximately 16 kilometres west of the shire town of Guysborough.

== History ==
In 1861, gold was discovered in quartz veins on the Isaac's Harbour anticline to the east of the community. All together 14 mines were developed in this area producing some 140,000 ounces of reported production. Production ceased in 1941 with the closure of the Lower Seal Harbour Mine.

In 1892, Howard Richardson was the first to note gold within shale and quartz veins which became generally known as the Boston Richardson Belt. Mining on the property began in 1892 when the Richardson Gold Mining Company started developing the belt and continued until 1912.

In 1985, exploration re-commenced on the Upper Seal Harbour gold district and in 1988 extensive surface and underground work was carried out by Orex Exploration. The property has seen several developers look at it from an open pit potential, but all to date have dropped their options. At present Anaconda Mining is conducting an extensive exploration program for gold in the surrounding areas including the former Boston Richardson Mine, Dolliver Mountain Mine, West Goldbrook Mine and East Goldbrook Mines. Plans are to develop an 800 TPD open pit and underground operation producing around 41,000 ounces per year.

During the late-1990s, Goldboro was selected as the eastern terminus for the Maritimes & Northeast Pipeline which connects to the Sable Offshore Energy Project (SOEI) gas plant. Goldboro has been marketed as the energy hub of Nova Scotia. The Sable project and Deep Panuke projects were closed in 2019. In 2012, Pieridae Energy announced it planned to develop a two train 10 million ton per annum LNG plant and associated facilities. The pre-development work was complete and a final investment decision was expected by the end of 2018 or early 2019 with production by 2022, but the company sold the empty site in 2024.

== Communications ==
- The postal code is B0H 1L0
- The Telephone exchange is 902-387

== Demographics ==
- Total Population: 100
- Total Dwellings: 85
- Total Land Area: 215.716 km^{2}

== Notable people ==
- Carleton L. MacMillan, physician and politician
- Robert A. MacLellan, politician
