= Mulgrave, Nova Scotia =

Mulgrave
- Town
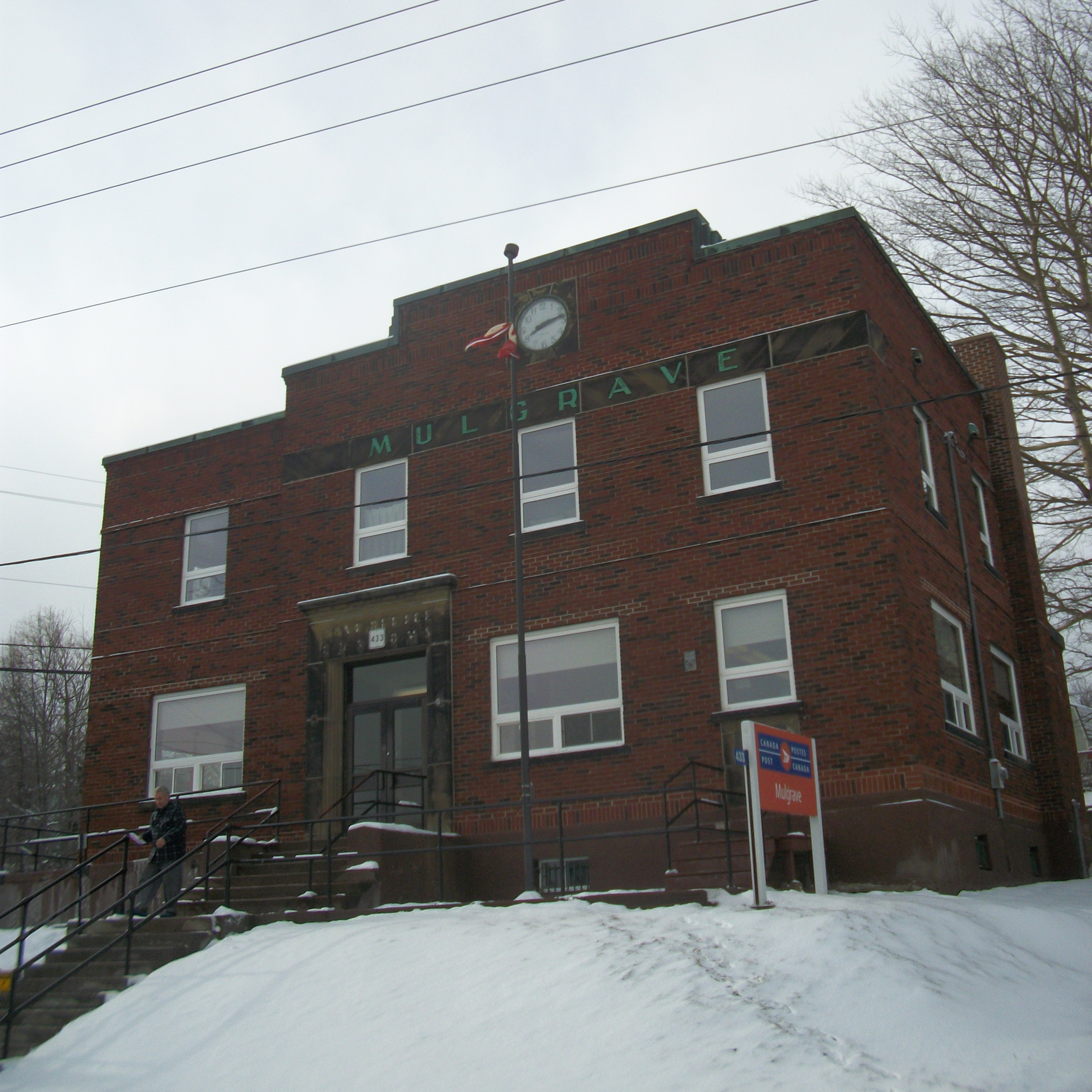
- Mulgrave Post Office

- Seal
- Nickname: Deep Water Port
- Motto: "Come be a part of our Family"
- Location of Mulgrave, Nova Scotia
- Coordinates: 45°36′48″N 61°23′30″W
- Country: Canada
- Province: Nova Scotia
- Municipality: Guysborough County
- Founded: 1800
- Incorporated: December 1, 1923

Government
  - Mayor: Ron Chisholm
  - Governing Body: Mulgrave Town Council
  - MLA: Greg Morrow (politician) (L)
  - MP: Mike Kelloway (L)

Area (2021)
  - Total: 17.83 km^{2} (6.88 sq mi)
- Elevation: 48 m (157 ft)

Population (2021)
  - Total: 627
  - Density: 35.2/km^{2} (91/sq mi)
- Time zone: UTC-4 (AST)
- Postal code: B0E 2G0
- Area code: 902
- Telephone Exchange: 287 747
- Median Earnings*: $59,200
- NTS Map: 011F11
- GNBC Code: CBAQK
- Website: www.townofmulgrave.ca
- Median household income, 2020 ($) (all households)

Mulgrave is an incorporated town on the Strait of Canso in Guysborough County, Nova Scotia, Canada. Located along the Marine Drive, Route 344 traverses the community. The town's current name was adopted in 1859 to honour the colonial Lieutenant Governor, the Earl of Mulgrave. Lying opposite to the town of Port Hawkesbury, the community is located along the western shore of the Canso Strait. It was established as McNair's Cove in the early 19th century, and the name Port Mulgrave was adopted in 1859, later shortening to its current form. The early industry of the community relied on ferry service between the Nova Scotia mainland and Cape Breton Island. Ferry service began in the 1810s and rail service reached the area in the 1880s. The ferry services lasted until the opening of the Canso Causeway in 1955, dealing a major blow to the local economy. As of 2021, Mulgrave has a population of 627 and a population density of 35.2/km^{2} (91.1/sq mi), within an area of 17.83 km^{2} (6.88 sq mi).

== History ==
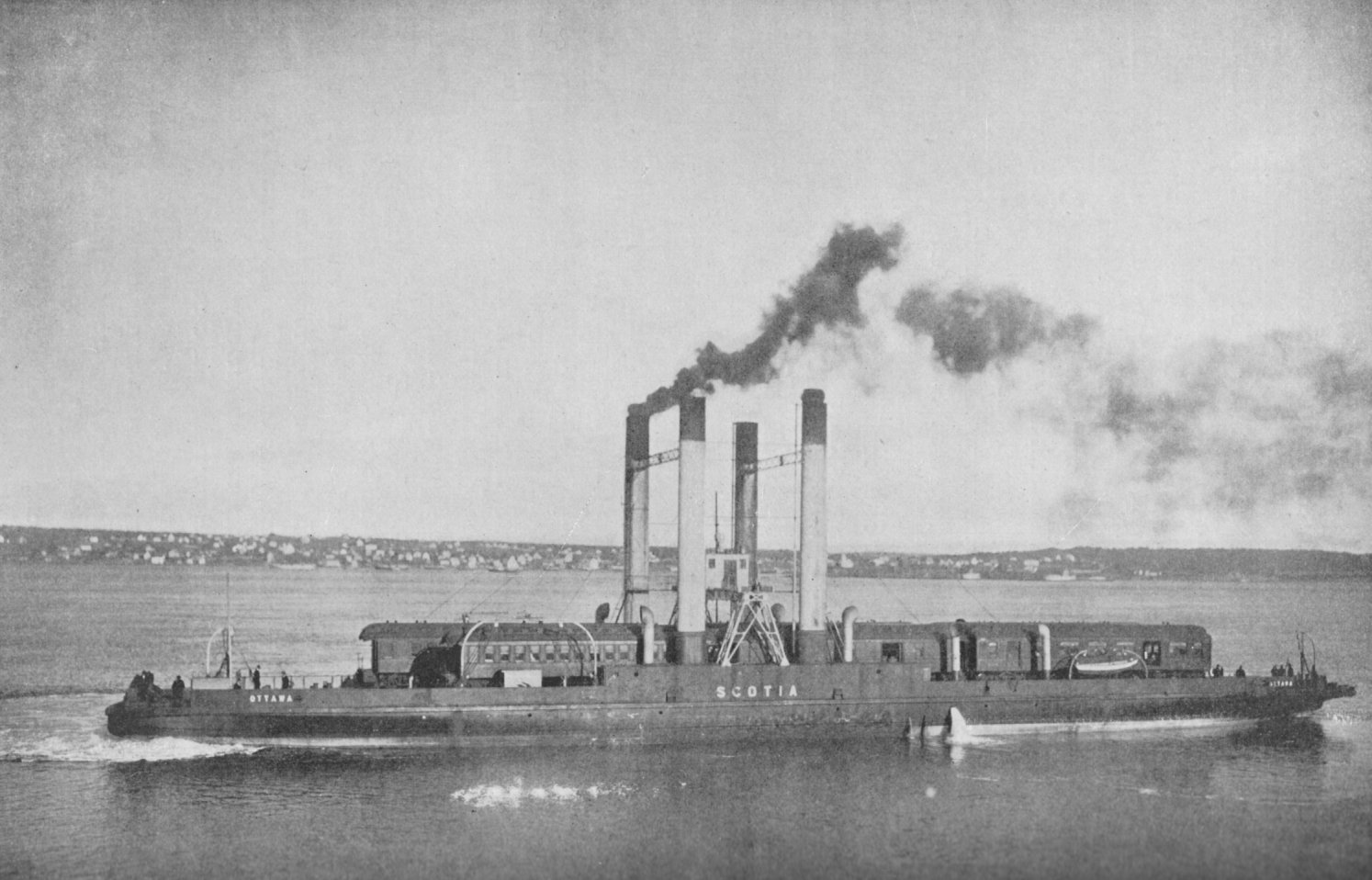
The Scotia rail ferry on the Strait of Canso around the turn of the twentieth century

First settled as McNair's Cove by British Loyalists fleeing from the American Revolution, the community soon became a part of the lumber trade with the English in the early part of the nineteenth century. The area was known to the mi'kmaq as Wolumkwagagunutk, translating as "lobster ground". Regular ferry service across the Canso Strait was established in the late 1810s. The ferry made an important contribution to the local economy. The community adopted the title Port Mulgrave in 1859, in honour of the colonial Lieutenant Governor, the Earl of Mulgrave, and the name was gradually shortened to its present form. Rail service reached the community in the 1882 and rail cars were transported across the strait by 1893.

The economy was badly affected however, when in 1870 trade agreements in the fishing industry were cancelled to protect the American fish market, and the local fishing industry collapsed. Gradually, people began moving away, and by 1880 more than a third of the population moved, mainly to New England in search of employment. By the turn of the 20th century, the railways has risen to become the main industry in Mulgrave, and the community was becoming a bustling rail terminal, equipped with several auxiliary services to the existing railways. Adding to the economy were a new lobster factory and a new rail ferry, which further increased capacity across the Strait of Canso to Port Hawkesbury. Mulgrave served as a link between mainland Nova Scotia and Cape Breton Island, as well as Newfoundland. In 1923, the community was incorporated as a town. In August 1955, the community suffered a major economic blow with the opening of the Canso Causeway which immediately removed both road and rail traffic through the town.

== Demographics ==
Historical population
Year	Pop.	±%
1956	1,227	—
1961	1,145	−6.7%
1981	1,099	−4.0%
1991	935	−14.9%
1996	896	−4.2%
2001	904	+0.9%
2006	879	−2.8%
2011	794	−9.7%
2016	722	−9.1%
2021	627	−13.2%

In the 2021 Census of Population conducted by Statistics Canada, Mulgrave had a population of 627 living in 292 of its 316 total private dwellings, a change of −13.2% from its 2016 population of 722. With a land area of 17.83 km^{2} (6.88 sq mi), it had a population density of 35.2/km^{2} (91.1/sq mi) in 2021.

== Public services ==
The headquarters of the Eastern Counties Regional Library is in Mulgrave.

== Notable residents ==
- Wallace MacDonald (1891–1978), silent film actor and director
- Robyn Meagher, Olympian

== See also ==
- List of municipalities in Nova Scotia
