= Municipality of the District of St. Mary's =

St. Mary's
- District municipality
- Municipality of the District of St. Mary's
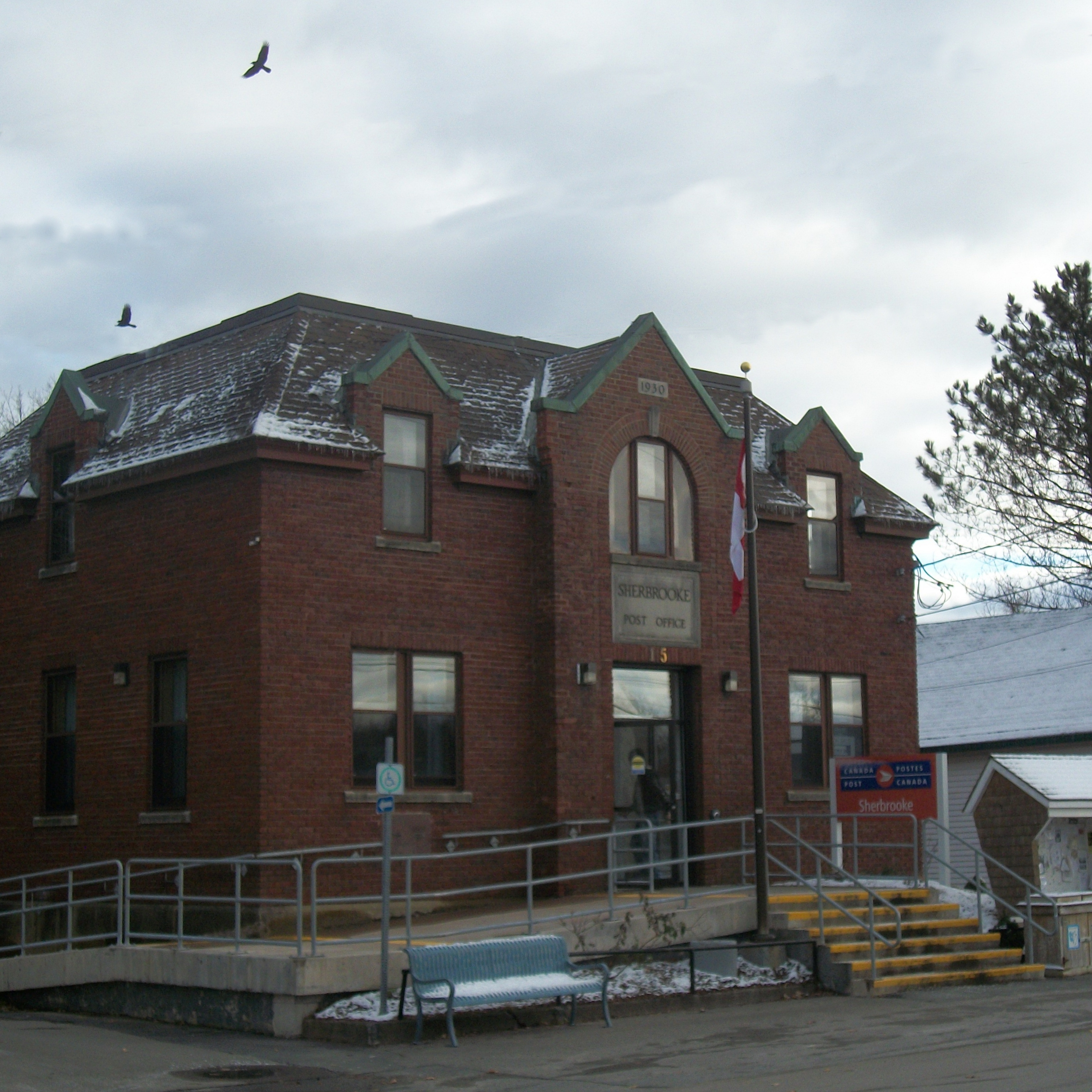
- Post office in Sherbrooke

- Seal
- Motto: Waters of the Atlantic Salmon
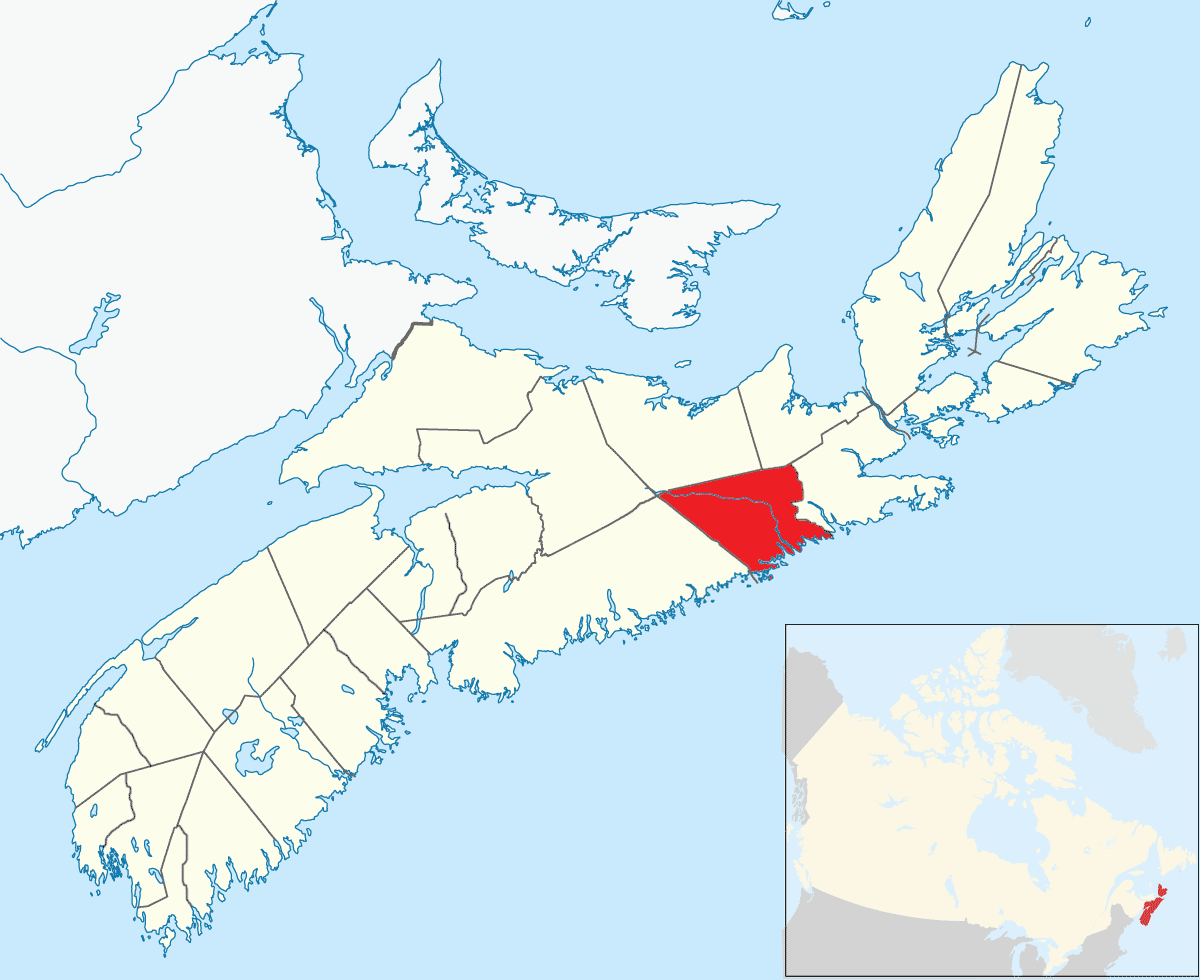
- Location within Nova Scotia
- Coordinates: 45°12′00″N 62°11′06″W
- Country: Canada
- Province: Nova Scotia
- County: Guysborough
- Incorporated: April 17, 1879
- Electoral Districts Federal: Central Nova
- Provincial: Guysborough–Eastern Shore–Tracadie

Government
  - Type: St. Mary's Municipal Council
  - Municipal Seat: Sherbrooke
  - Warden: James Fuller

Area
  - Land: 1,909.47 km^{2} (737.25 sq mi)

Population (2021)
  - Total: 2,161
  - Density: 1.1/km^{2} (2.8/sq mi)
  - Change 2016–21: ▼3.2%
  - Census ranking: 1,317 of 4,870
- Time zone: UTC-4 (AST)
  - Summer (DST): UTC-3 (ADT)
- Area code: 902
- Dwellings: 1,700
- Median Income*: $35,789 CDN
- Website: Official website
- Median household income, 2005 (all households)

St. Mary's, officially named the Municipality of the District of St. Mary's, is a district municipality in Guysborough County, Nova Scotia, Canada.

The district municipality occupies the western half of the county and its administrative seat is in the village of Sherbrooke.

== History ==
The first inhabitants of the area were the indigenous Mi'kmaq people. The French established a presence along the St. Mary's River in the 17th century. The area was widely settled by the British in the early 19th century.

The District of St.Mary's was created in 1879 with the act establishing municipal governments in Nova Scotia. Prior to this, the tasks of local administration were combined with local courts and the Justices of the Peace.

== Demographics ==
In the 2021 Census of Population conducted by Statistics Canada, the Municipality of the District of St. Mary's had a population of 2,161 living in 1,047 of its 1,538 total private dwellings, a change of −3.2% from its 2016 population of 2,233. With a land area of 1,904.08 km^{2} (735.17 sq mi), it had a population density of 1.1/km^{2} (2.9/sq mi) in 2021.

Population trend
Census	Population	Change (%)
2021	2,161	▼3.2%
2016	2,233	▼5.1%
2011	2,354	▼9.0%
2006	2,587	▼6.5%
2001	2,766	▼6.3%
1996	2,952	▼6.9%
1991	3,172	N/A

Mother tongue language (2021)
Language	Population	Pct (%)
English only	2,060	96.7%
Other language(s)	30	1.4%
French only	30	1.4%
Both English and non-official language(s)	5	0.2%
Both English and French	0	0.00%

== Electoral districts ==
The district municipality is divided into five electoral districts for municipal representation.

== See also ==
- List of municipalities in Nova Scotia
