= Municipality of the District of Guysborough =

Guysborough
- District municipality
- Municipality of the District of Guysborough
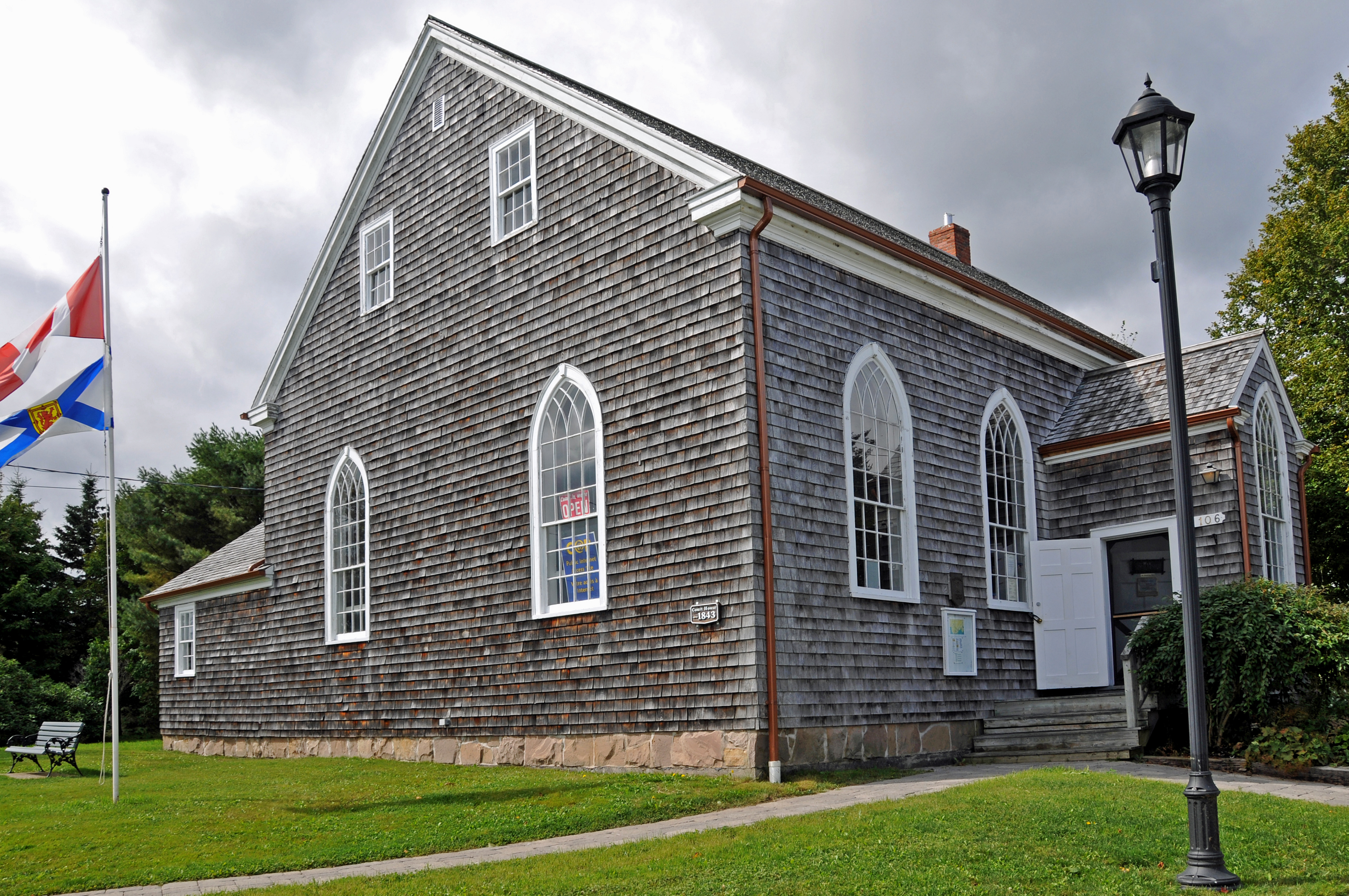
- Old Court House Museum and Visitor Information Centre

- Flag Seal

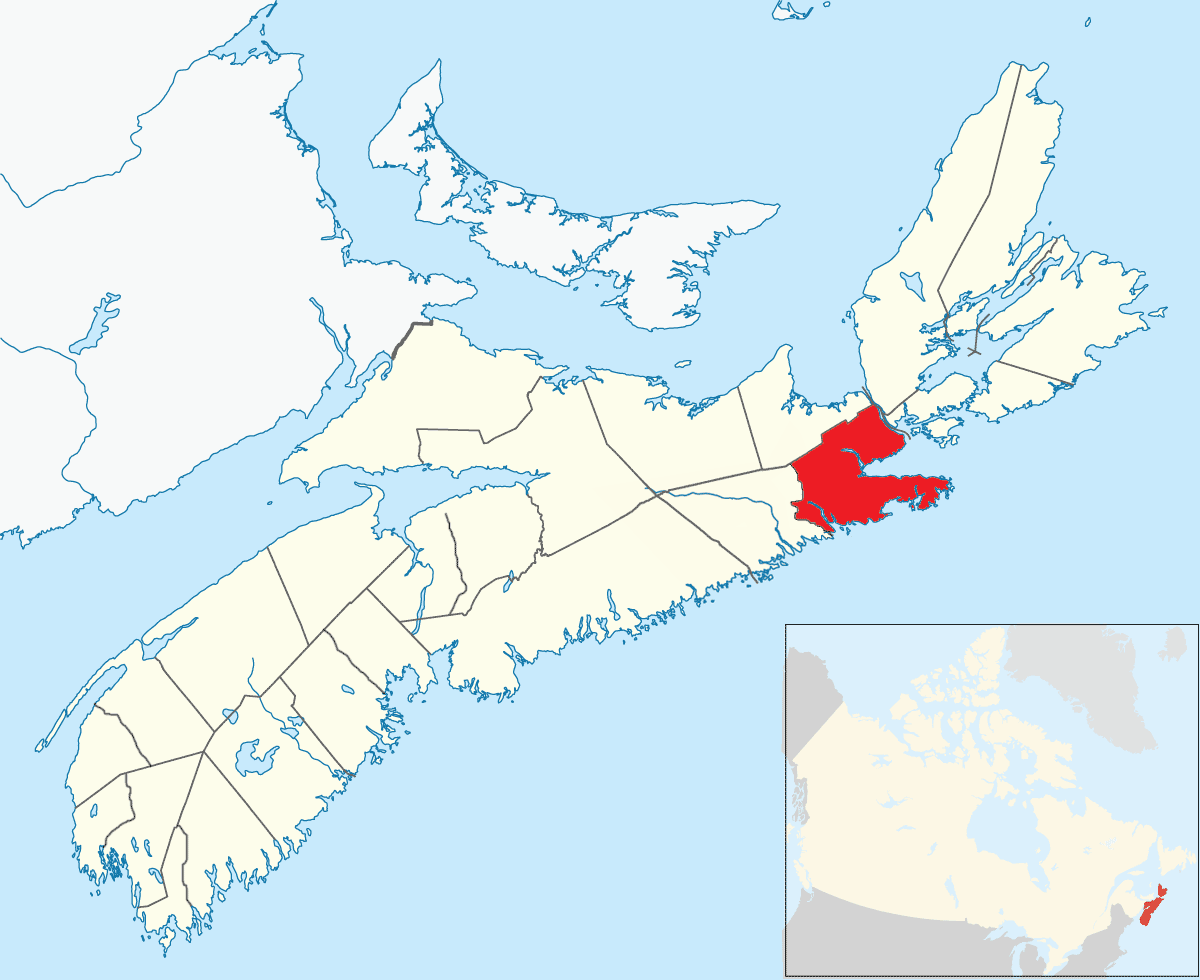
- Location of the Municipality of the District of Guysborough
- Coordinates: 44°26′00″N 064°35′57″W
- Country: Canada
- Province: Nova Scotia
- County: Guysborough
- Incorporated: April 17, 1879

Government
  - Type: Council of the Municipality of the District of Guysborough
  - Municipal Seat: Guysborough
  - Warden: Paul Long

Area
  - Land: 2,116.86 km^{2} (817.32 sq mi)

Population (2016)
  - Total: 4,670
  - Density: 2.21/km^{2} (5.71/sq mi)
  - Change 2011-16: ▼6.5%
  - Census ranking: 751 of 4,870

Electoral districts
  - Federal: Cape Breton—Canso
  - Provincial: Guysborough–Eastern Shore–Tracadie
- Time zone: UTC-4 (AST)
  - Summer (DST): UTC-3 (ADT)
- Area code: 902
- Dwellings: 2,889
- Median Income*: $34,987 CDN
- Website: www.municipality.guysborough.ns.ca
- Median household income, 2005 (all households)

Guysborough, officially the Municipality of the District of Guysborough, is a Canadian district municipality in Guysborough County, Nova Scotia. First inhabited by the Mi'kmaq, The area was colonized by France in the 17th century. Large numbers of loyalists settled in the area after the American Revolutionary War. The Municipality was created in 1879 when the administration of Guysborough County was divided between Guysborough and St. Mary's. Canso was incorporated as a town in 1901, but dissolved and rejoined the municipality in 2012. The municipal office is located in Guysborough.

== History ==
The area was originally inhabited by the Mi'kmaq, who had seasonal settlements on the coast of Chedabucto Bay at Cooks Cove and Canso. The Mi'kmaq extensively used the waterways feeding into Chedabucto Bay as trade and travel routes.

The area was first visited by European fishermen in the early 16th century, and the first attempt at settlement was made in 1518 at Canso. Canso became a centre for fishing and fur trading activity in the region.

=== French Settlement ===
The French established control over the area in the early 17th century. A Catholic mission was established at present day Guysborough (called Chedabuctou by the French) in 1629, with a fort first being constructed in 1632. In 1654, Nicolas Denys expanded on the previous fort and made an attempt at settlement. In 1682, a permanent settlement was established by Clerbaud Bergier and the Company of Acadia. Fort St. Louis was built to establish control over the region and it's fishery.

Following Queen Annes War, the area was contested between France and Britain. The British expelled the French from Canso and destroyed Fort St. Louis in 1718 and built Fort William Augustus in 1720, and Canso was raided by the French numerous times until France's final expulsion from the region during the French and Indian War. The Acadian population at Chedabuctou left in the early 1760's.

=== British Settlement ===
British settlers began arriving shortly after the departure of the Acadians. A large influx of settlers arrived in the form of Loyalists and former British soldiers in the aftermath of the American Revolutionary War. The community of Guysborough was established by the Loyalists, named in honour of Sir Guy Carleton.

The area was originally part of Sydney County, from which Guysborough County was split in 1836. In 1840, Guysborough County was subdivided into two districts for court sessisonal purposes – Guysborough and St. Mary's. In 1879, the two districts were incorporated as district municipalities.

=== Recent History ===
In a plebiscite held on July 12, 2008, residents of the Town of Canso narrowly voted to amalgamate the town with the Municipality of the District of Guysborough. On January 19, 2012, the Nova Scotia Utility and Review Board granted the town's application to dissolve. On July 1, 2012, Canso became part of the Municipality of the District of Guysborough.

== Government ==
The district is divided into eight electoral districts, each of which elects a local councilor. The Warden of the Municipality is selected from among the council, by the council. The current Warden is Paul Long, councilor for district 1. The Chief Administrative Officer is the head of the administrative branch of the municipal government.

== Geography ==
Occupying the eastern half of Guysborough County, the district municipality's administrative centre is the community of Guysborough. The district completely surrounds the Town of Mulgrave and it borders the Municipality of the District of St. Mary's to the west, the Municipality of the County of Antigonish to the north and the Strait of Canso to the east.

== Demographics ==
In the 2021 Census of Population conducted by Statistics Canada, the Municipality of the District of Guysborough had a population of 4,585 living in 2,220 of its 3,043 total private dwellings, a change of −1.8% from its 2016 population of 4,670. With a land area of 2,115.25 km^{2} (816.70 sq mi), it had a population density of 2.2/km^{2} (5.6/sq mi) in 2021.

Population trend
Census	Population	Change (%)
2016	4,670	revised boundaries
2011	4,189	▼10.6%
2006	4,681	▼9.4%
2001	5,165	▼13.1%
1996	5,942	▼7.0%
1991	6,389	N/A

Mother tongue language (2021)
Language	Population	Pct (%)
English only	4,345	96.20%
Other languages	70	1.80%
French only	90	1.80%
Both English and French	10	0.21%

== Amenities ==
=== National Historic Sites ===
- Canso Islands National Historic Site

=== Provincial Parks ===
- Black Duck Cove Provincial Park
- Boylston Provincial Park
- Port Shoreham Beach Provincial Park
- Salsman Provincial Park
- Tor Bay Provincial Park

=== Wilderness Areas ===
- Bonnet Lake Barrens Wilderness Area
- Canso Coastal Barrens Wilderness Area
- Ogden Round Lake Wilderness Area

== See also ==
- List of municipalities in Nova Scotia
