= Guysborough County =

- County
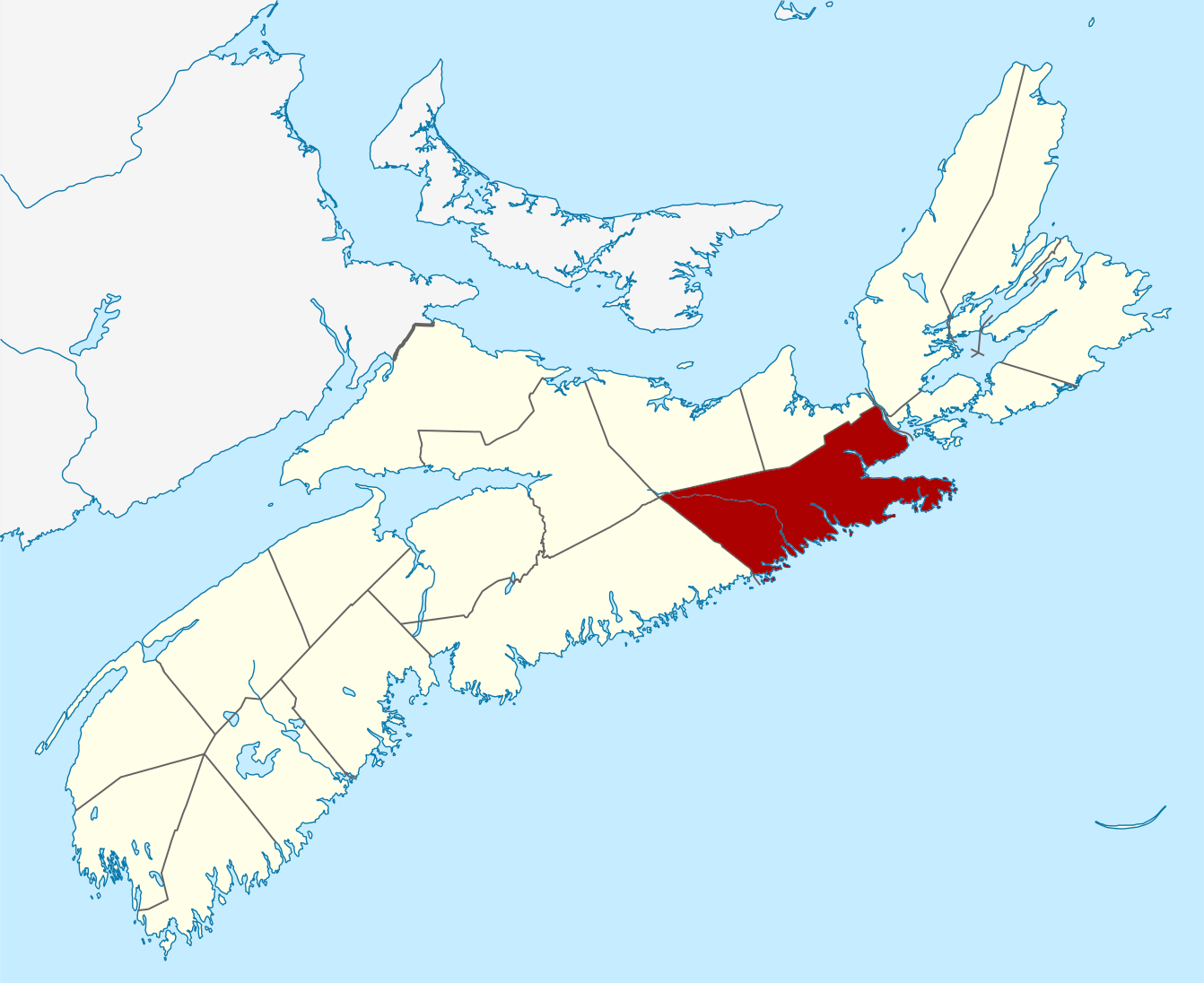
- Location of Guysborough County, Nova Scotia
- Coordinates: 45.3°N 61.8°W
- Country: Canada
- Province: Nova Scotia
- District municipalities: Guysborough / St. Mary's
- Towns: Mulgrave
- Established: 1836
- Divided into District Municipalities: April 17, 1879
- Named for: Sir Guy Carleton
- Electoral Districts Federal: Central Nova / Cape Breton—Canso
- Provincial: Guysborough–Eastern Shore–Tracadie

Area
  - Land: 4,037.16 km^{2} (1,558.76 sq mi)

Population
  - Total: 7,373
  - Density: 1.8/km^{2} (4.7/sq mi)
  - Change 2016–21: ▼3.3%
  - Census rankings – District municipalities Guysborough St. Mary's – Town Mulgrave: 4,681 (721 of 5,008); 2,587 (1,110 of 5,008) 879 (2,234 of 5,008)
- 2021
- Time zone: UTC-4 (AST)
  - Summer (DST): UTC-3 (ADT)
- Area code: 902
- Dwellings: 5,377
- Median income*: $34,894
- Median household income, 2005 (all households)

Guysborough County (Scottish Gaelic: Siorramachd a' Mhainisdeir) is a historic county in the Canadian province of Nova Scotia. The area was first inhabited by the indigenous Mi'kmaq, and was colonized by France in the 17th century. Following the defeat of France in North America, the area was settled by loyalists after the American Revolutionary War. The county was created when it was split from Sydney County in 1836. Guysborough County was divided into two administrative districts with separate councils and courts in 1879: Guysborough and St. Mary's. The town of Canso was incorporated in 1901, followed by Mulgrave in 1923. Canso was dissolved as a town in 2012.

While there has been no county administration since 1879, Guysborough County exists as a census subdivision. As of 2021, Guysborough County had a population of 7,373, down from a peak population of 18,320 in 1901. The largest communities are Canso, Mulgrave, Sherbrooke, and Guysborough.

== History ==
The Mi'kmaq were the first inhabitants of the areas, having a seasonal settlement near Cook's Cove, and are known to have frequented other sites like Canso and the St Mary's River.The Mi'kmaq name for the region was Eskikewa'kik, meaning "skin dressing place". European fishermen and fur traders first visited the area in the 16th century, with the French establishing a colonial presence in the 17th century. The area came under the control of the British after Queen Anne's War, and most of the Acadian population left in the 1760s. From 1720 to 1759, the British establishment at Canso was a highly contested strategic location for the colonial wars against France.

Present day Guysborough County was first part of Halifax County, established 1759. Sydney County was divided from Halifax County in 1784, and comprised present day Antigonish and Guysborough Counties. That same year, the community of Guysborough was founded by Loyalists, named for Sir Guy Carleton. By the mid 19th century, Guysborough County was organized into multiple townships: Guysborough, Manchester, Wilmot, Stormont, and St Mary's.

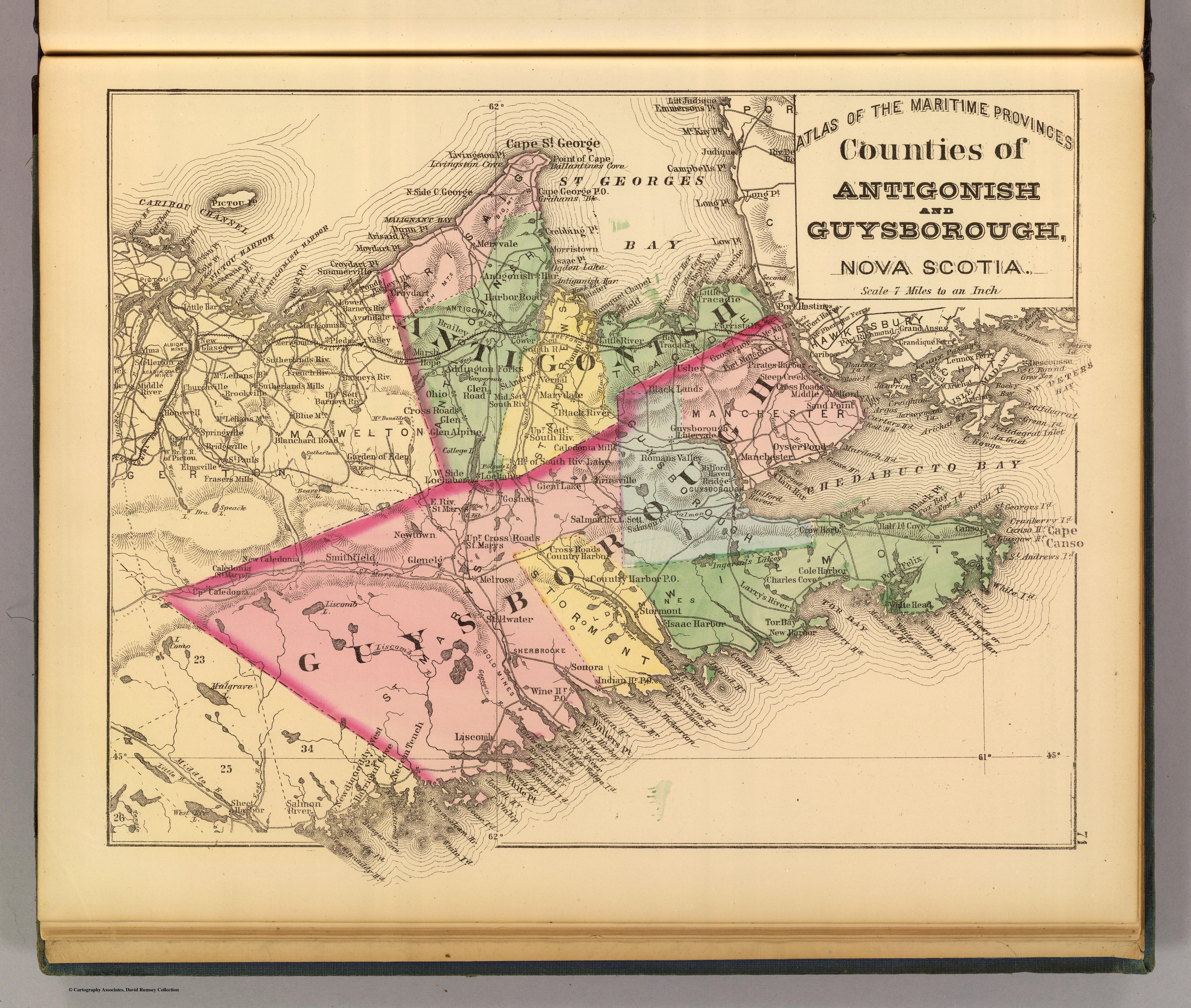
Map of Antigonish and Guysborough Counties from 1878.

Guysborough County was created when Sydney County was divided in 1836. The new county took its name from the Township of Guysborough, which became the county seat. What remained of Sydney County was renamed to Antigonish County in 1863.

Guysborough County has had a large Black population since 1784. The Black Nova Scotian community in Guysborough is unique in that they descend almost entirely from Black Loyalists. In 1872, there were 918 residents of African ancestry in Guysborough.

In 1840, Guysborough County was subdivided into two districts for court sessional purposes – Guysborough and St. Mary's. In 1863, the boundary between Halifax County and Guysborough County was altered and a polling district was added to Guysborough County. In 1879, the two districts were incorporated as district municipalities. In 1901, Canso was incorporated as a town with its own municipal government, Mulgrave followed suit in 1923. Canso was dissolved as a town in 2012 and merged into the Municipality of the District of Guysborough.

The last racially segregated school in Canada closed in 1983 in Guysborough County.

== Demographics ==
As a census division in the 2021 Census of Population conducted by Statistics Canada, Guysborough County had a population of 7,373 living in 3,559 of its 4,897 total private dwellings, a change of −3.3% from its 2016 population of 7,625. With a land area of 4,037.16 km^{2} (1,558.76 sq mi), it had a population density of 1.8/km^{2} (4.7/sq mi) in 2021.

Population trend

Census	Population	Change (%)
2021	7,373	▼3.3%
2016	7,625	▼6.4%
2011	8,143	▼10.1%
2006	9,058	▼7.8%
2001	9,827	▼10.0%
1996	10,917	▼6.9%
1991	11,724	▼8.5%
1986	12,721	▼0.2%
1981	12,752	N/A
1941	15,461	
1931	15,443	
1921	15,518	
1911	17,048	
1901	18,320	
1891	17,195	
1881	17,808	
1871	16,555	N/A

Mother tongue language (2011)

Language	Population	Pct (%)
English only	7,755	96.52%
French only	160	1.99%
Non-official languages	100	1.24%
Multiple responses	25	0.31%

Ethnic Groups (2006)

Ethnic Origin	Population	Pct (%)
Canadian	4,520	50.5%
Scottish	2,760	30.8%
English	2,620	29.3%
Irish	2,240	25.0%
French	1,795	20.1%
German	1,050	11.7%
Dutch (Netherlands)	270	3.0%

== Communities ==
Towns

- Mulgrave

District municipalities

- Municipality of the District of Guysborough
- Municipality of the District of St. Mary's

== Access Routes ==
Highways and numbered routes that run through the county, including external routes that start or finish at the county limits:

- Highways
  - None
- Trunk Routes
  - Trunk 4
  - Trunk 7
  - Trunk 16
- Collector Routes:
  - Route 211
  - Route 276
  - Route 316
  - Route 344
  - Route 347
  - Route 348
  - Route 374
- External Routes:
  - None

== See also ==
- List of communities in Nova Scotia
- Black Lake listings within Nova Scotia.
