= Geography of Nova Scotia =

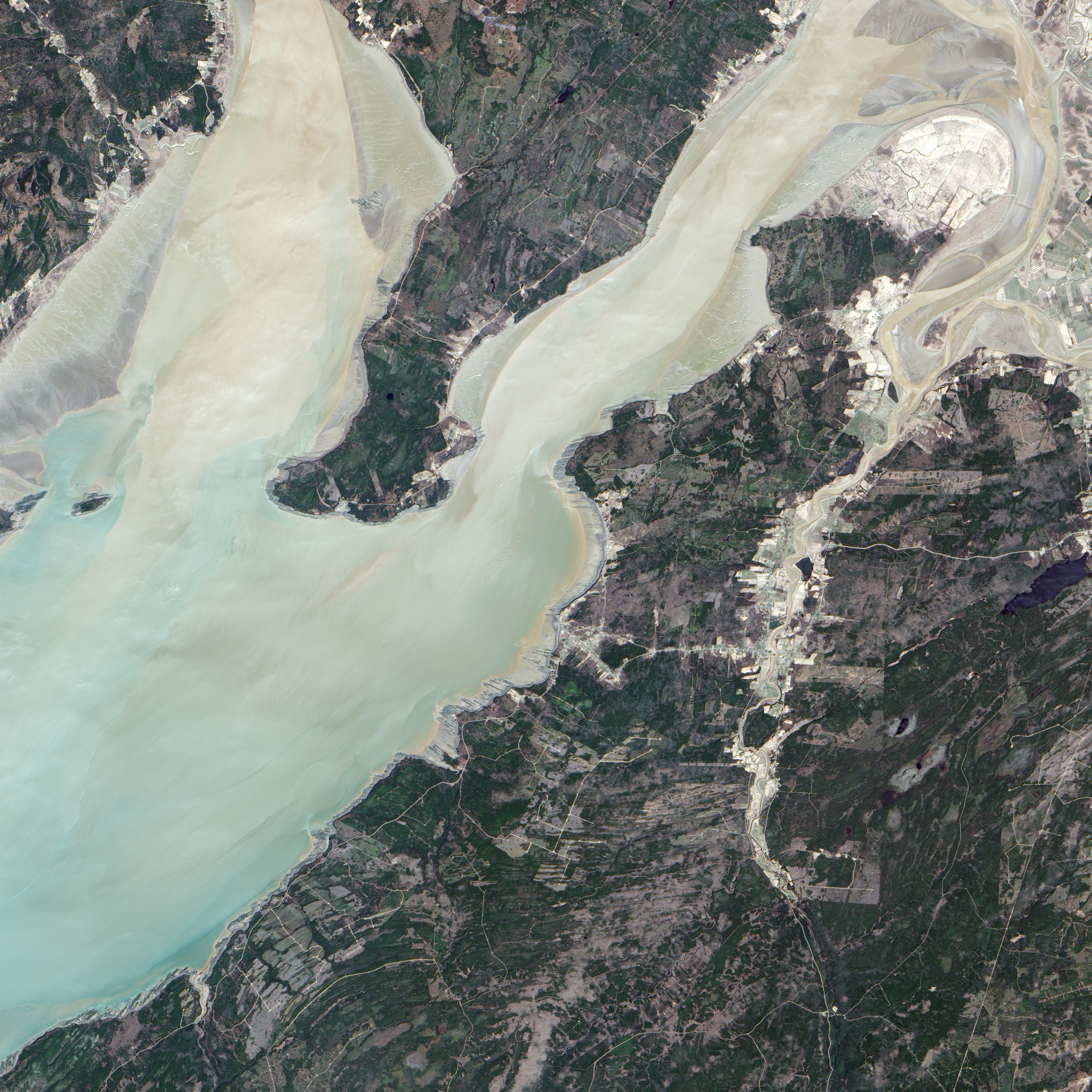
Joggins Cliffs as seen from space

Nova Scotia is a province located in Eastern Canada fronting the Atlantic Ocean. One of the Maritime Provinces, Nova Scotia's geography is complex, despite its relatively small size in comparison to other Canadian provinces.

== Physical geography ==
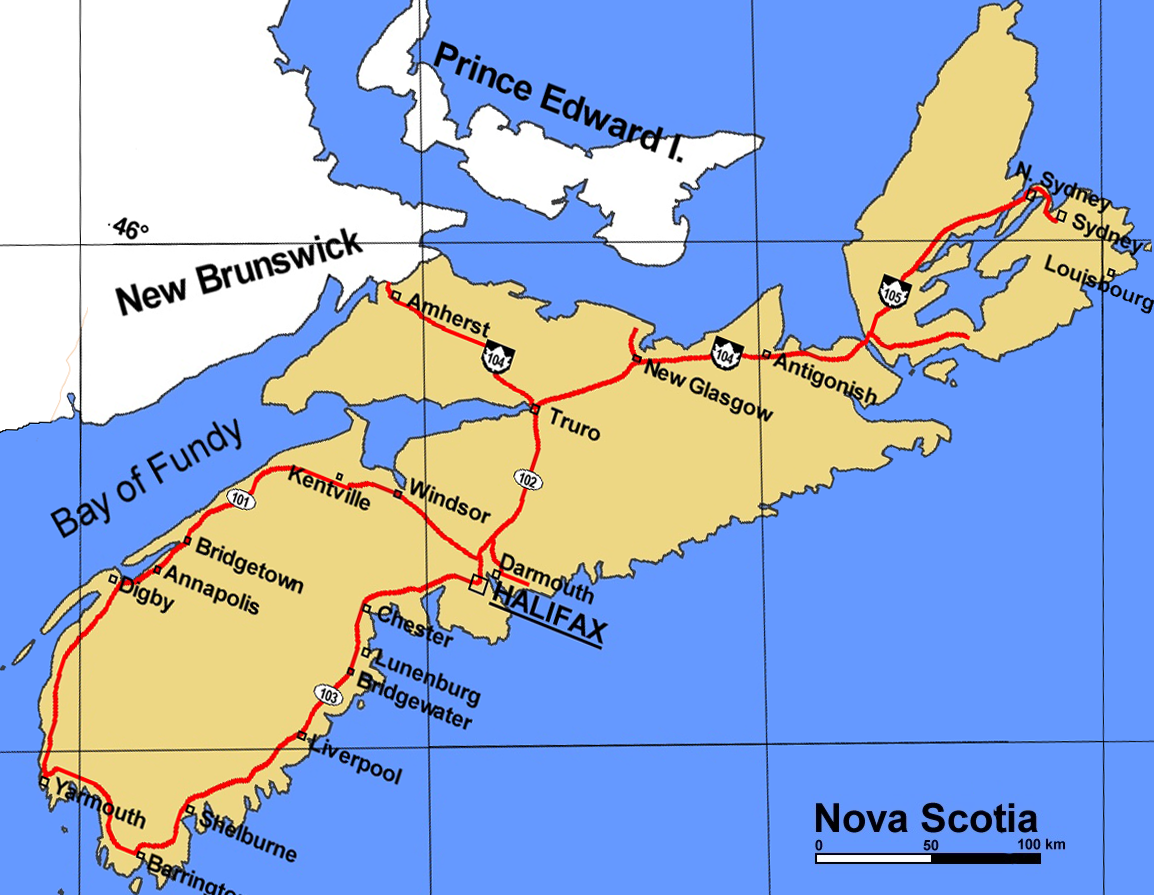
Map of Nova Scotia

The mainland portion of the Nova Scotia peninsula is attached to North America through the Isthmus of Chignecto. Various offshore islands, the largest of which is Cape Breton Island, form the bulk of the eastern part of the province.

The geological history of the province spans more than 1.2 billion years . Continental drift led to the southern half of the province's mainland portion, the Meguma terrane, once being attached to Africa whereas the Avalon terrane comprising the northern half, including Cape Breton Island, was once attached to Scandinavia and Scotland. The Meguma terrane became joined to the present North American landmass as part of the Appalachian orogeny. Composed largely of Cambrian to Ordovician sedimentary deposits, it is joined to the Avalon terrane along the Minas Fault Zone, which runs east–west from Chedabucto Bay to Cobequid Bay.

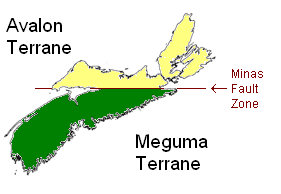
Today's Nova Scotia is made of two geologic terranes.

Nova Scotia has a great variety of coastal landforms. Most of the land in Nova Scotia is bedrock. As a result of erosion and transportation of unconsolidated material, landforms such as beaches and marshes are being formed. These deposits are also being eroded and/or flooded by the rising sea level.

Glaciation during the Quaternary Period had an overwhelming effect upon the landscape. Glaciers abraded and plucked at the bedrock during their advances across the country, creating various deposits that vary in thickness and form; in some places, they are up to 300 meters thick.

Nova Scotia's numerous hills, several low mountain ranges (the entire province is located within the Appalachian Mountains), lush river valleys, lakes and forests, windswept barrens, and a varied sea coast ranging from extremely rugged to broad sandy beaches, can be attributed to these forces.

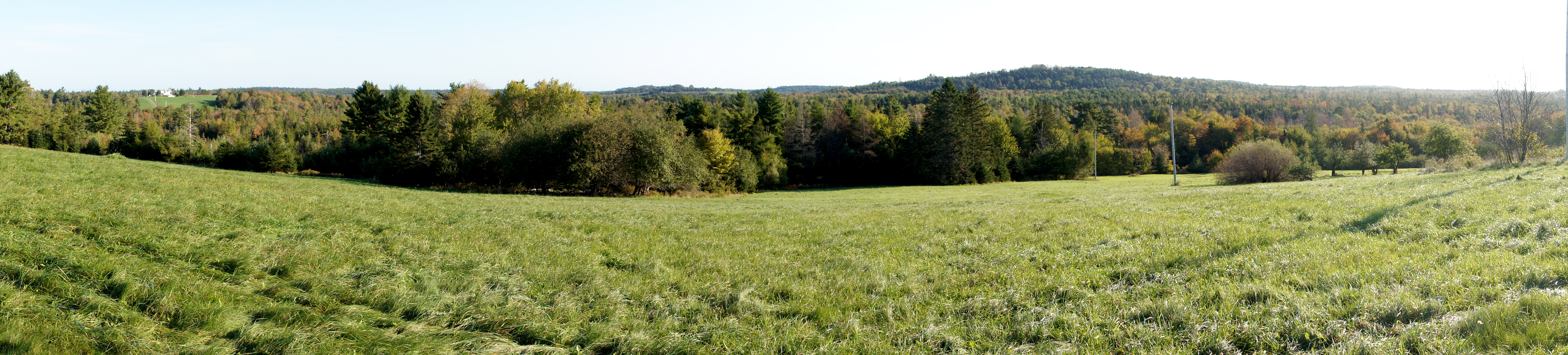
Drumlins, or little hills formed by glacial action, are a key feature in this and other communities in Lunenburg County. Here on the left is the "James Hirtle Hill" and on the right is the "Michael Wile Hill". The image is being taken from the "Bolivar Hill."

Nova Scotia forms part of the southern shores of the Gulf of St. Lawrence and its sub-basin, the Northumberland Strait. The Cabot Strait lies north and east of Cape Breton Island. The main part of the Bay of Fundy lies off its northwestern shore, and large sub-basins including the Cumberland Basin, the Minas Basin and Cobequid Bay create major indentations into its coastline. The Gulf of Maine (of which the Bay of Fundy is a component) lies off the western shore. The South Shore and Eastern Shore, as well as the southern and eastern parts of Cape Breton Island constitute a pelagic coast, fronting the open Atlantic Ocean.

The Atlantic coast of Nova Scotia has numerous offshore fishing banks which are submerged sections of the continental shelf. Rising sea levels since glaciation have inundated many parts of the coastline, including these areas on the continental shelf, providing rich habitat for marine life, as well as defining other unique features such as various coastal islands, bays, harbours and the Bras d'Or Lake – an 1,100 square kilometres (420 sq mi) estuary that defines the central portion of Cape Breton Island.

== Cultural geography ==
=== History of Nova Scotia ===
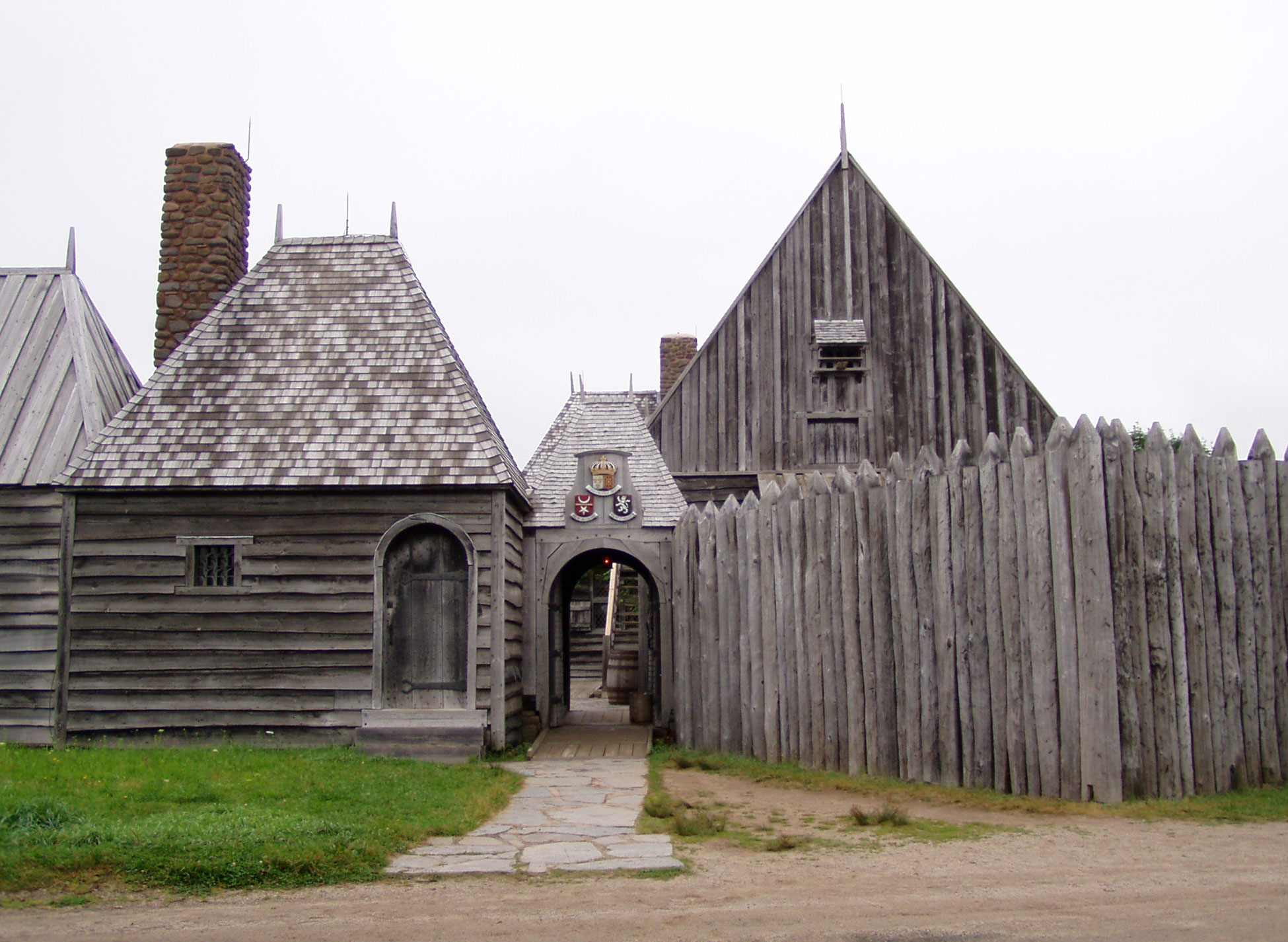
Replica of Pierre Dugua, Sieur de Mons's habitation at the Port-Royal National Historic Site.

Initially, settlement patterns in Nova Scotia were defined by water transportation routes for the Maritime Archaic Indian civilization, followed by their descendants, the Mi'kmaq Nation, who used coastal waters for seasonal marine fishing and rivers and lakes for freshwater fishing.

European discovery resulted in settlements in protected natural harbours and along shorelines where convenient trade routes for sailing ships provided reliable transportation to markets in Europe, New England and the Caribbean. European settlers brought industrial fishing technologies and introduced large-scale forestry to sustain settlement construction and shipbuilding activities.

Wars between European military powers, notably Britain and France, resulted in various territorial claims and numerous defence works established along Nova Scotia's coastal settlements and inland trade routes. The largest of these defensive installations was a French military fortified port at Louisbourg Harbour on Cape Breton Island. The fortified military port of Halifax on Halifax Harbour was similarly founded to counter Louisbourg's presence. A French settlement at Port-Royal is currently the second longest continuously occupied European settlement in North America (after St. Augustine, Florida).

Originally part of Acadia, the territory fluctuated for several decades through competing claims from Scotland (under Sir William Alexander, who gave the territory the name "Nova Scotia" in honour of his homeland) and England. France relinquished Acadia in 1713 under the Treaty of Utrecht. However, the boundaries were not delineated, and Britain only gained control of present-day peninsular Nova Scotia. Britain's colonial capital was established at Annapolis Royal, while France maintained control of Cape Breton Island (which they called Île Royale). The French territory of Acadia and New France finally fell permanently to Britain at the end of the Seven Years' War in 1763. The colonial capital was transferred from Annapolis Royal to Halifax in 1749 upon the establishment of that community.

Under British control, Acadian farming settlements that had been abandoned under the Great Upheaval were populated by decommissioned soldiers and settlers brought from New England. Foreign Protestants were actively recruited to settle Nova Scotia (which at that time included present-day New Brunswick) as the Empire's "Fourteenth Colony" in America. The presence of the Royal Navy and British Army in the colony largely contributed to stability that saw the colony remain loyal during the American Revolutionary War. In 1784, Britain created the colony of New Brunswick to accommodate United Empire Loyalist refugees from the seceding American colonies. Cape Breton Island was also created as a separate colony, leaving Nova Scotia to its mainland peninsula once again. In 1820, the colony of Cape Breton Island was permanently folded back into Nova Scotia, resulting in the present-day provincial territory.

Transportation networks in the form of canals (the Shubenacadie Canal) and later railways (the Nova Scotia Railway, followed by the Intercolonial Railway, the Dominion Atlantic Railway, the Halifax and Southwestern Railway and the Sydney and Louisburg Railway), contributed to a growing trend toward urbanization in the years leading up to the entry into Confederation in 1867. The settlement was concentrated around major industrial towns and port communities.

Motor vehicle usage in the 20th century led to highway development and suburban sprawl around larger centres.

=== Economic geography ===
Traditionally, Nova Scotia's economy has been defined by natural resources in the primary sector.

Resources available for mining include coal, gypsum, iron ore, gold, salt and barite. Offshore deposits of oil and natural gas have begun being exploited.

The fishing fleet operates on the continental shelf, especially on the Grand Banks. Years of overfishing have led to setbacks in production. Lobster, scallops, and haddock are currently the biggest catches.

Inland, forests yield spruce lumber and the province's industries produce much pulp and paper. In the northwest, dairy farming is an important sector of the economy. The Annapolis Valley and Kings County have orchards. There also are significant grain, hay, fruit, and vegetable crops. The bay lowlands, which were reclaimed by dikes in the 17th century, are very productive for agriculture.

The economy has been undergoing a slow transition to a post-industrial service-oriented structure in recent decades. Manufacturing is becoming the largest sector of Nova Scotia's economy. Iron and steel are produced in Sydney. Also, there is food processing (especially of fish), and manufacturing of automobiles, tires, sugar, and construction materials. Halifax is a railroad terminus and a year-round port. There are hydroelectric and tidal power-generating plants. Coast, countryside, and historical sites attract tourists.

== Geography by region ==
=== Cape Breton Island ===
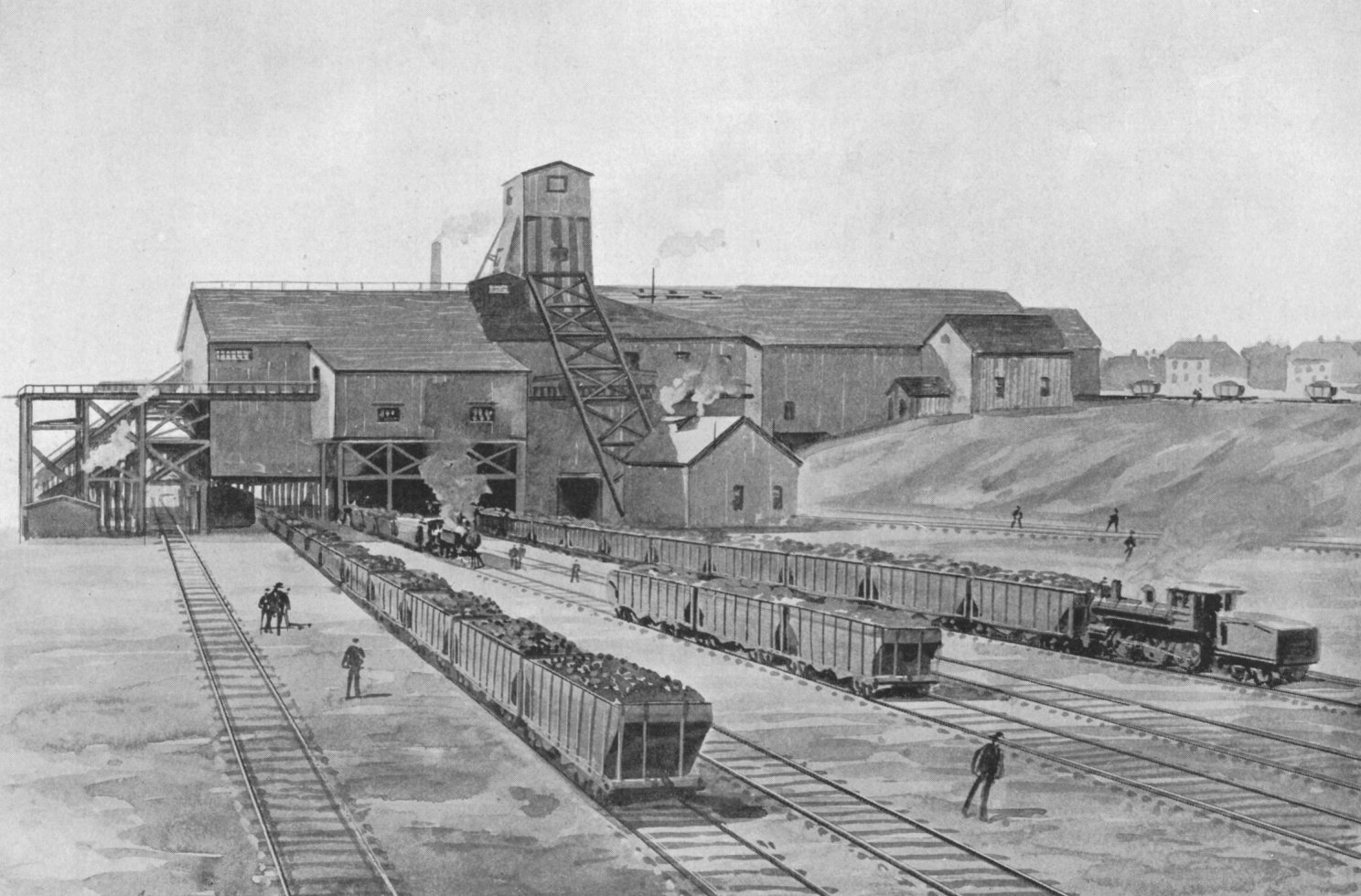
Dominion Coal Company, Cape Breton Island, circa 1900.

Cape Breton Island is notable for its mining industry. When explorers and settlers arrived here in the 17th and 18th centuries, they were focused on the coal, which was discovered in rocks and cliffs. Coal was used to heat houses and factories, used by blacksmiths to mold iron, and for the steam engines of trains. Coal was extracted principally in the Sydney–Glace Bay area of Cape Breton Island until the mines were closed in 2001. Many mines have shut down as coal becomes a less popular fuel. Despite this, Nova Scotia still gets most of its electricity from coal, most of which is now imported. Some of Cape Breton's mines have been turned into tourist attractions and museums, and retired miners take people on tours of old mines.

=== Central and Northern ===
Northumberland Strait, between Nova Scotia and Prince Edward Island, is 320 kilometres (200 mi) long and approximately 14 to 50 kilometres (8.7 to 31.1 mi) wide. The shoreline varies from sandstone and sandy beaches in the west to granite rocky beaches in the east. The strait's fishing industry is currently in a decline, but lobster remains a commonly sought species.

The areas north of the Minas Basin contain extensive coal seams, with numerous mines in production since 1758. There have been several disasters resulting in coal miners being injured or killed, the most famous being the Springhill Mining Disaster (1958) and the most recent being the Westray Mine Disaster (1992).

The Cobequid Bay, the innermost part of the Bay of Fundy, experiences the world's highest tides, averaging up 49.5 feet (15.1 m) at Burntcoat Head. Parrsboro's Fundy Geological Museum houses the world's most complete collection of fossils from the Coal Age (approximately 300 million years ago) and the Joggins Fossil Cliffs have been designated a UNESCO World Heritage Site. Many exceptional finds of dinosaurs and plant life have been found in the cliffs along the Bay of Fundy.

Among the longest rivers in Nova Scotia is the Shubenacadie, which runs 78 kilometres (48 mi) from the Bay of Fundy into Grand Lake in Enfield. This river is one of few worldwide which experience a tidal bore, a visible rush of seawater twice daily during the incoming tide, caused by the funnel shape of the Bay of Fundy and the high tides which are experienced in the region.

Gypsum mining is an industry in central Nova Scotia south of the Minas Basin. The world's largest gypsum mine is located at Milford. Gypsum is a component in drywall production, which is used as a construction material. It can be used as a soil conditioner to improve drainage and fertility of the soil.

=== Eastern Shore ===
==== Population ====
The area between Dartmouth and Cape Breton is sparsely populated.

The decline in the fishing industry has meant an outflow of people to larger urban areas and to other fishing villages in the province. Sheet Harbour & Canso with populations of 885 & 820 respectively, are the largest communities. There are more than 300 communities along the Eastern Shore, which vary in size.

==== Tourism ====
See main article: Tourism on the Eastern Shore (Nova Scotia)

Tourism is becoming an increasingly active industry along the Eastern Shore.

There is a Fisherman's Life Museum in Jeddore Oyster Ponds. There is trout fishing & Atlantic salmon serves as a sport in rivers along the coast. At Eastern Passage there is a Fishermen's Village tourist attraction with a few stores.

The largest beaches on the Eastern Shore are Lawrencetown Beach, in Lawrencetown, Martinique Beach, near Musquodoboit Harbour & Taylor Head Beach, located in Spry Bay, within the boundaries of Taylor Head Provincial Park.

==== Geography/Industry ====
There are many lakes along the Eastern Shore, the largest of which are Porter's Lake, Lake Charlotte & Tangier Grand Lake.

Several major rivers flow into the harbours & coastal indents along the Eastern Shore, including:

- The Musquodoboit River, which flows into the Musquodoboit Harbour.
- The Tangier River, which flows from Tangier Grand Lake to immediately west of the community of Tangier
- West River-Sheet Harbour & East River Sheet Harbour, which flow into the Northwest & Northeast Arms of Sheet Harbour respectively.
- The Saint Mary's River flows into the Atlantic Ocean, passing through the community of Sherbrooke.

In the Eastern Shore of Nova Scotia, the forests grow close to the water. A sawmill was constructed in Sheet Harbour around the year 1921, at the head of the Northwest Arm. In 1971, the sawmill was destroyed by Hurricane Beth. It was never rebuilt.

=== South Shore ===
Lunenburg County's population is about 48,000, of which about 6000 people are Acadian. Many others are related to the first German settlers. It is known for its shipbuilding industry.

Mahone Bay has three churches – Trinity United, St. John Lutheran and St. James Anglican – which have stood by the head of the harbour for over one hundred years. The word "Mahone" derives from Mahone, the French word for the private ships that sailed by the shore of the Mahone Bay.

Peggys Cove is a small community known for its rocky shore and lighthouses, one of which serves as a Canada Post office during the summer. It is also the location of the Swissair Flight 111 memorial and a sculpture by the resident William E. deGarthe which serves as a monument to Nova Scotian fishermen.

=== Nova Scotia's provincial berry and flower ===
On January 11, 1996, the House of Assembly declared the wild blueberry the Provincial Berry of Nova Scotia. The blueberry mainly grows in northeastern North America.

Forests cover all of Nova Scotia. In these woodlands, often nearly hidden with fallen leaves, grows the mayflower, also known as the trailing arbutus (Epigaea repens). In 1901 the mayflower was declared to be the Provincial Flower of Nova Scotia by the provincial legislature.

== Climate ==
Located on the east coast of Canada, Nova Scotia is almost entirely surrounded by the sea, which heavily influences the climate due to oncoming Atlantic storms. Due to the ocean's moderating effect Nova Scotia has cool summers as opposed to other cities in Canada around the same latitude. Nova Scotia's maritime climate is influenced by the cold air masses passing from the centre of Canada and the warm air masses from the Atlantic Ocean. Winters can be very severe, blizzards occur several times each winter. Winters are cold compared with other coastal cities on the same latitude because the direction of the Atlantic currents is going east to Europe.

Because it juts out into the Atlantic, Nova Scotia is prone to tropical storms and hurricanes in the summer and autumn.

== See also ==
- List of highest points of Canadian provinces and territories
- List of areas disputed by the United States and Canada
- Toponymy of Nova Scotia
