= Nova Scotia Route 211 =

Highway in Nova Scotia, Canada

Route 211

Route information
- Maintained by Nova Scotia Department of Transportation and Infrastructure Renewal
- Length: 35 km (22 mi)

Major junctions
- West end: Trunk 7 in Stillwater
- Country Harbour Ferry
- East end: Route 316 in Isaac's Harbour North

Location
- Country: Canada
- Province: Nova Scotia

Highway system
- Provincial highways in Nova Scotia; 100-series
← Route 210	→ Route 212

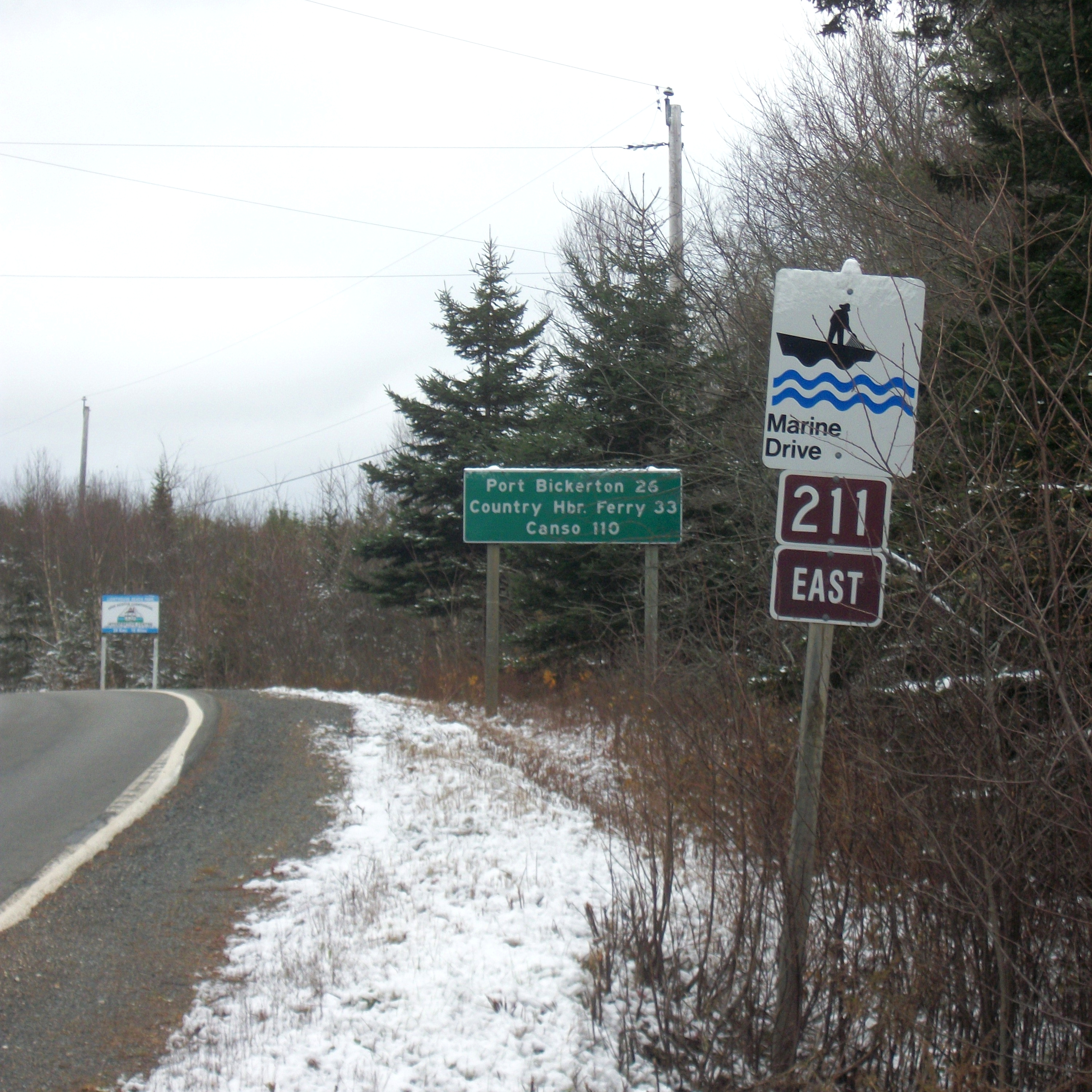
Route sign in Stillwater, Guysborough County, Nova Scotia

Route 211 is a west-east collector road in the south-east of the Canadian province of Nova Scotia. It is located in Guysborough County and connects Stillwater on Trunk 7 to Isaac's Harbour North on Route 316. It is near the Atlantic coast, directly south of Antigonish and west of Canso. It is in a forested area, is 35 kilometres long, and is paved for its entire length.

== Route ==
Route 211 begins on Trunk 2 at Stillwater. It starts by going southeast for 15 kilometres, following Indian Harbor. Afterwards it follows the coast, passing through Port Bickerton, and is slightly more winding. The route then turns north, until the Country River, where the route joins with a ferry line. It then connects with Route 316, where it finishes at Isaac Harbour North.

== Communities ==
- Stillwater
- Jordanville
- Indian Harbour Lake
- Port Hilford
- Harpellville
- Port Bickerton
- Isaac's Harbour North

== See also ==
- List of Nova Scotia provincial highways

== Sources ==
- MapArt (2008). Canada back road atlas / atlas des rangs et chemins. Oshawa, Ontario: MapArt Publishing. ISBN 978-1-55368-614-9.
