= Indian Harbour =

Indian Harbour may refer to the following places:

- Indian Harbour, Newfoundland and Labrador
- Indian Harbour, Nova Scotia
- Indian Harbour, former name of Port Hilford, Nova Scotia
- Indian Harbour Beach, Florida
- Indian Harbour Lake, Nova Scotia
