= Quoddy =

Quoddy can mean the following places:

Canada

- East Quoddy, Nova Scotia
- West Quoddy, Nova Scotia

United States

- Quoddy Head State Park in Maine
- West Quoddy Head Light in Maine
