= Pleasant Harbour, Nova Scotia =

Community in eastern Canada

Coordinates: 44°47′36.3″N 62°43′0.9″W

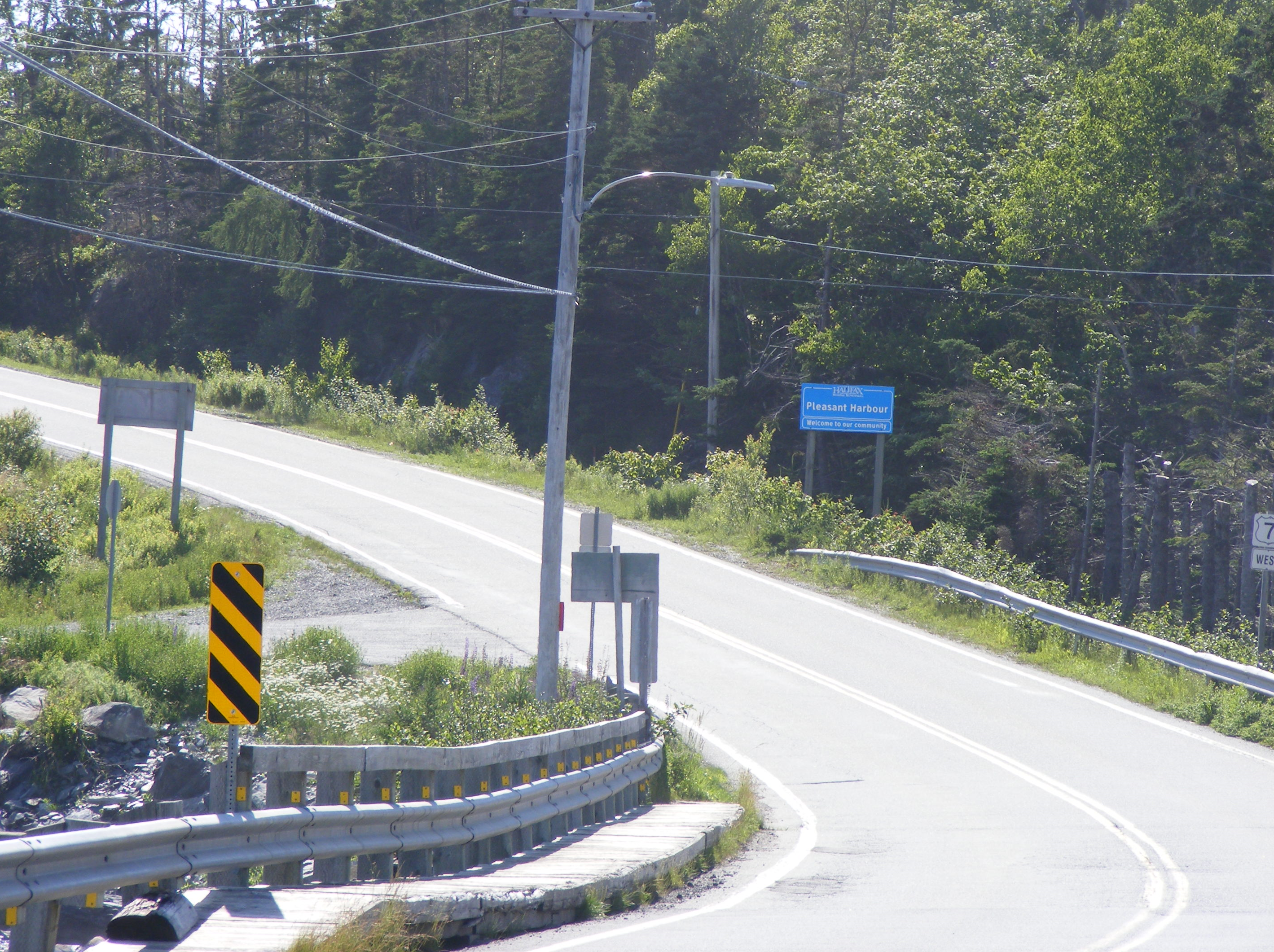
Pleasant Harbour, July 2023.

Pleasant Harbour in Nova Scotia

Pleasant Harbour is a rural community located on the Eastern Shore of Nova Scotia, Canada. The community is situated on the Marine Drive, on Nova Scotia Trunk 7, about 30 km (19 mi) west of Sheet Harbour, Nova Scotia. The community is located on the shores of Shoal Bay, an inlet of the Atlantic Ocean. The mi'kmaq name for the area was Wospegeak, translating to "the sunshine is reflected from the water". Settlement of the area began around 1812, and the present name for the community was adopted in 1886.
