= Spry Harbour, Nova Scotia =

Community in Nova Scotia, Canada

Coordinates: 44°50′12.1″N 62°37′12.8″W

Spry Harbour in Nova Scotia

Spry Harbour is a rural community on the Eastern Shore of Nova Scotia, Canada, in the Halifax Regional Municipality, located along the Marine Drive on Nova Scotia Trunk 7. The community is located about 15 km (9.3 mi) west of Sheet Harbour, Nova Scotia. The community is located around Taylor Bay and Spry Harbour, inlets of the Atlantic Ocean.
