= Moosehead, Nova Scotia =

Community in Nova Scotia, Canada

Coordinates: 44°56′29.7″N 62°15′58.4″W

Moosehead in Nova Scotia

Moosehead is a rural community on the Eastern Shore of Nova Scotia, Canada, in the Halifax Regional Municipality.

The community lies along the Marine Drive about 29 km (18 mi) east of Sheet Harbour, Nova Scotia on Trunk 7. The community is primarily located along the western shore of Necum Teuch Bay, an inlet of the Atlantic Ocean.
