= Mushaboom =

Mushaboom may refer to:

- "Mushaboom" (song), by Feist, 2004
- Mushaboom, Nova Scotia, a community in Canada
