= Harrigan Cove, Nova Scotia =

Community in Nova Scotia, Canada

Coordinates: 44°55′55.18″N 62°17′19.03″W

Harrigan Cove in Nova Scotia

Harrigan Cove is a rural community on the Eastern Shore of Nova Scotia, Canada, in the Halifax Regional Municipality. The community is located along the Marine Drive on Nova Scotia Trunk 7 about 25 km (16 mi) east of Sheet Harbour, Nova Scotia. The community is located in the vicinity the cove of the same name and is named for an early settler who came to the area after 1827.

== History ==
Harrigan Cove was once known for gold mines, after it was discovered there in 1868. However, the gold mining industry did not really take off until the early 20th century.
