= Necum Teuch =

Community in Nova Scotia, Canada

Necum Teuch in Nova Scotia

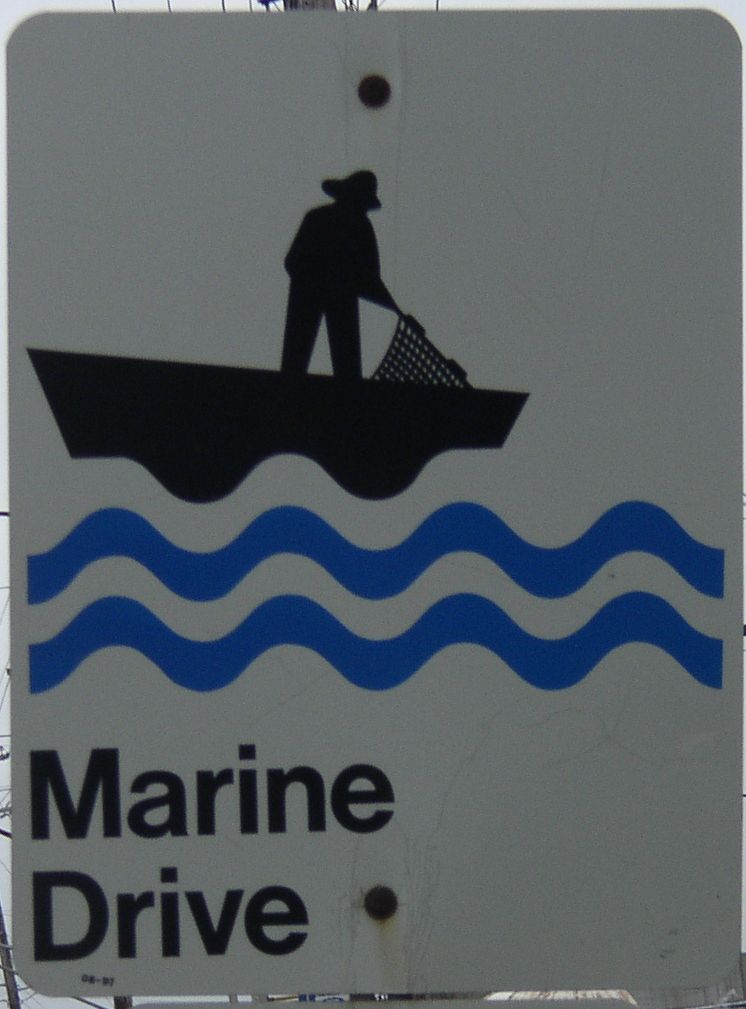
On Marine Drive

Necum Teuch (pronounced nee-comm-taw) is a small rural community on the eastern shore of the Halifax Regional Municipality Nova Scotia in the Musquodoboit/Sheet Harbour region of the Marine Drive on Trunk 7. The community is famous for the lifelike scarecrows created by Angela Smith Geddes, author of children's books, including "The Scarecrows of Necum Teuch", "Necum Teuch Notes", "The Shadow People", and several others.

== Communications ==
- Postal Code B0J 2K0
- Telephone exchange 902 347
