= East Ship Harbour, Nova Scotia =

Community in Nova Scotia, Canada

Coordinates: 44°46′43.4″N 62°47′50.5″W

East Ship Harbour in Nova Scotia

East Ship Harbour is a rural community on the Eastern Shore of Nova Scotia, Canada, in the Halifax Regional Municipality. The community is located on the Marine Drive on Nova Scotia Trunk 7, about 33 km (21 mi) west of Sheet Harbour, Nova Scotia. The community is located along the shores of Ship Harbour, an inlet of the Atlantic Ocean. The mi'kmaq name for the area was TedumunaBoogwek, translating to "water-worn rock".
