= Mushaboom, Nova Scotia =

Community in Nova Scotia, Canada

Mushaboom
- Location within Nova Scotia
- Coordinates: 44°51′4.9″N 62°32′6.3″W
- Country: Canada
- Province: Nova Scotia
- Municipality: Halifax Regional Municipality
- District: 2
- Founded: 1818

Government
  - Governing Council: Halifax Regional Council
- Time zone: UTC-4 (AST)
  - Summer (DST): UTC-3 (ADT)
- GNBC Code: CBAWU
- Highways: Trunk 7
- Part of a series about Places in Nova Scotia

Mushaboom is a rural community on the Eastern Shore of Nova Scotia, Canada. It is a part of the Halifax Regional Municipality and lies along the Marine Drive on Trunk 7. The community is located about 13 km (8.1 mi) southwest of Sheet Harbour. and east of Taylor Head Provincial Park.

The name Mushaboom is likely a shortened form of the Mi'kmaq word Moosaboon-elagwaak which means "a pile of hair". Mi'kmaq legend says that fairies would play ball and run, pulling at one another's hair as they did so. They would pull so hard that locks of hair would come away and then the fairies would scatter the locks on the ground. An early name for the settlement was "Winchelsea Harbour", likely named for a ship on which the founders of Halifax arrived in 1749. The area was barren and unsettled in 1818, but by 1827, 14 families lived here and the community was referred to as '"Taylor's Bay" or "Chelsea Bay".

Mushaboom is located primarily on the eastern shore of Mushaboom Harbour. Taylor Head Provincial Park comprises the western shore of the harbour. Numerous islands are located in the harbour, the largest of which include Malagash Island and Boutilier Island. Various coves along the harbour indent the coastline of the community. A beluga whale sanctuary had been proposed between two islands south of the community, in a passage known locally as "The Gates". The sanctuary was declined by the public and has been relocated to Sherbrooke.

Canadian singer-songwriter Leslie Feist's song "Mushaboom" on her breakthrough album Let It Die was inspired by seeing a small house for sale in the area in the early 2000s.
