= Port Bickerton, Nova Scotia =

Community in Nova Scotia, Canada

Coordinates: 45°6′47″N 61°43′25″W

Port Bickerton in Nova Scotia

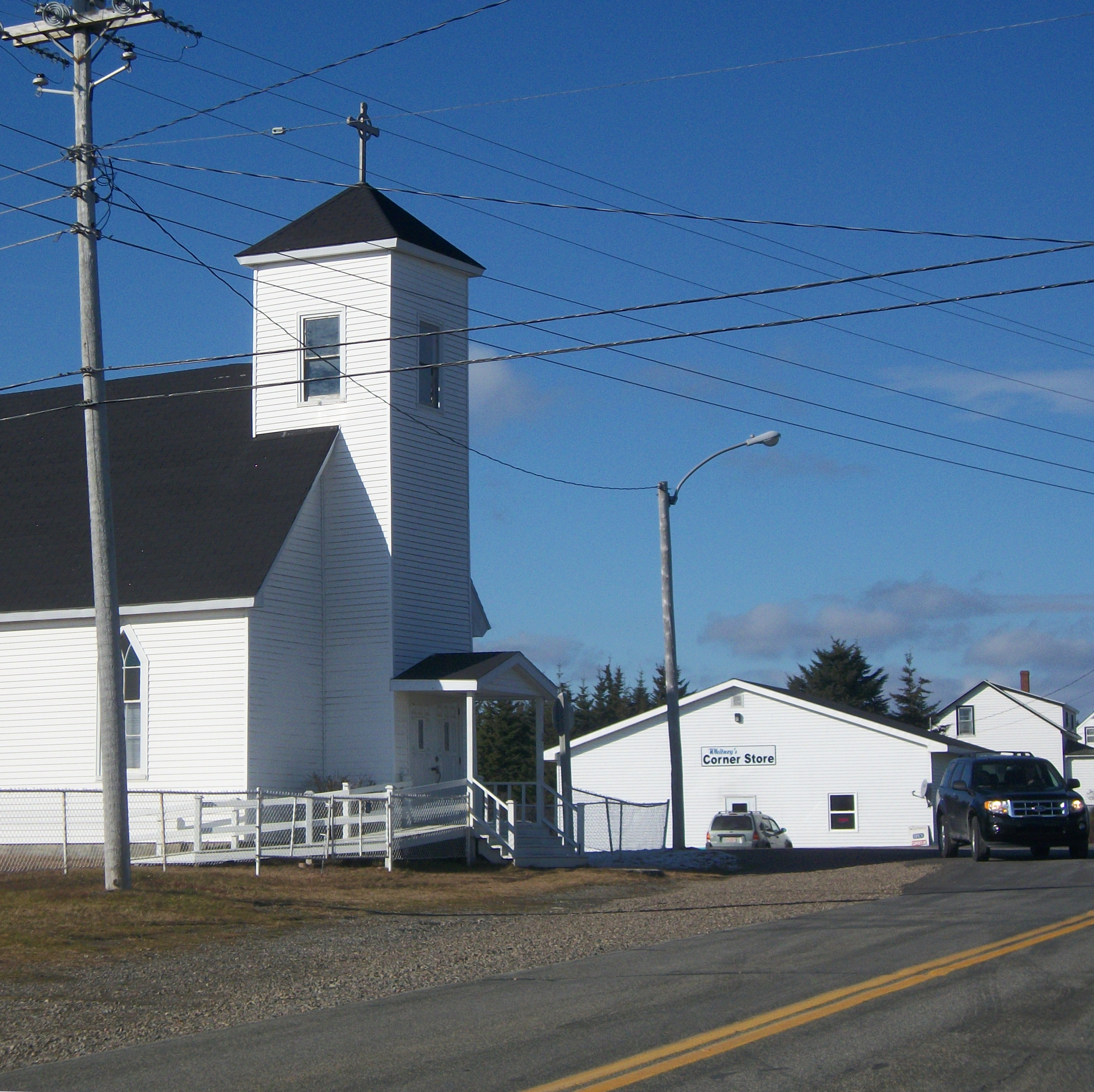
West Bickerton, Guysborough NS

Port Bickerton is a small community in the Canadian province of Nova Scotia, located in the Municipality of the District of Saint Mary's in Guysborough County.

Port Bickerton consists of two adjoining communities: Port Bickerton proper, and Bickerton West. Together they host a number of churches, a community hall, volunteer fire department, a convenience store, a federal post office and a Canadian Coast Guard office. Located on Nova Scotia Route 211, there is a nearby cable ferry (Stormont II) which links the community to Isaac's Harbour North across Country Harbour. There is an eponymous lighthouse nearby that is operated as a tourist attraction.
