= Liscomb =

Liscomb can be one of the following places:

- Liscomb, Iowa
- Liscomb, Nova Scotia
- Liscomb Mills, Nova Scotia
- Liscomb Sanctuary, Nova Scotia
- Liscomb Game Sanctuary
