= Stormont II =

Coordinates: 45.171751°N 61.699905°W

The Stormont II is a cable ferry operating in the Canadian province of Nova Scotia.

Stormont II was built by Ferguson Industries Ltd. at Pictou in 1980. It is owned by the Minister of Transportation and Infrastructure Renewal.

Stormont II currently operates on a 0.41 nmi (760 m) route across Country Harbour in Guysborough County where it connects Port Bickerton in the west with Isaac's Harbour North in the east, carrying traffic for Route 211.

The ferry has a capacity of 12 automobile-equivalent vehicles, measuring 24.72 m (81.1 ft) in length and 9.45 m (31.0 ft) in breadth while having a draught of 1.52 m (5.0 ft). It has a gross tonnage of 84 GT and is powered by a 74 kW (99 hp) diesel engine which pulls the ferry on a fixed cable at a speed of 5 kn (9.3 km/h).
