= Pirate Harbour, Nova Scotia =

Community in Nova Scotia, Canada

Coordinates: 45°35′4.17″N 61°22′55.16″W

Pirate Harbour in Nova Scotia

Pirate Harbour is an unincorporated community in the Canadian province of Nova Scotia, located in the Municipality of the District of Guysborough in Guysborough County. The community is located just south of Mulgrave, on the west side of the Strait of Canso. The Mi'kmaq name for the place was Tesogwode, "the place where goods were sorted." The name Pirate Harbour was allegedly given because the space between the small island and the cove provided safe anchorage and a hiding place for pirates such as Captain Kidd and Paul Jones. A settlement was established in 1785, and early settlers included John Wilson and John Peeples, who each received a thousand-acre grant there in 1785.
