= Popes Harbour, Nova Scotia =

Coordinates: 44°48′34.3″N 62°38′45.4″W

Popes Harbour in Nova Scotia

Popes Harbour is a rural community of the Halifax Regional Municipality in the Canadian province of Nova Scotia, about 20 km (12 mi) west of Sheet Harbour, Nova Scotia. The community is located along the shores of Popes Harbour, an inlet of the Atlantic Ocean. The Mi'kmaq names for the area were Kwemoodech and Kwemoodeech, translating to "little loon place" and "small harbour" respectively. Before 1827, the settlement was referred to as Deane Harbour. The present name for the community is in honour of an early pioneer family. Popes Harbour is known for Abriel's Fisheries.
