= Ecum Secum =

Community in Nova Scotia, Canada

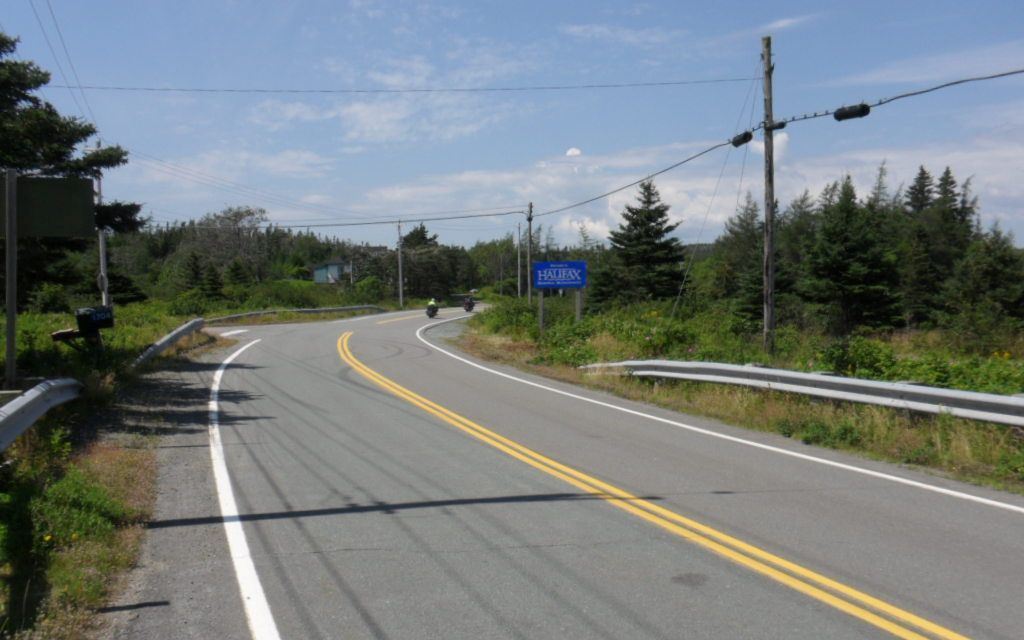

- Location within Nova Scotia
- Coordinates: 44°58′5″N 62°7′54″W
- Country: Canada
- Province: Nova Scotia
- Municipality: Guysborough; Halifax
- GNBC Code: CAKZM

Ecum Secum is a rural community on the Eastern Shore of Nova Scotia, Canada, located in both the Halifax Regional Municipality and Guysborough County. Located along the shores of Ecum Secum Harbour, an inlet of the Atlantic Ocean, the community is located roughly 46 km (29 mi) east of Sheet Harbour, Nova Scotia, 37 km (23 mi) southwest of Sherbrooke, Nova Scotia, and approximately 160 km (99 mi) east of Downtown Halifax along the Marine Drive on Trunk 7. Several communities along the western shore of the harbour also share the name, including Ecum Secum Bridge and Ecum Secum West.

== Etymology ==
The origin of the name Ecum Secum is unclear. The name is thought to be a corruption of a Mi'kmaq language term, with previous spellings of the name including Ekamsagen and Ekemsikam. The spelling had changed to its current form by the time a post office was established there in 1873, or as early as 1845. Some have disputed the name's Mi'kmaq origin; according to Robert MacGregor Dawson in his 1960 paper on Nova Scotia place names, the Mi'kmaq referred to the area as Megawasagank, meaning "a red house". In Place-Names and Places of Nova Scotia, the Mi'kmaq name for the area is listed as Agwaseegunk or Megwasaagunk, with the same meaning given. The Mi'kmaw Place Names Digital Atlas, released in 2015, provides the Mi'kmaq language name for Ecum Secum as Mekwe'saqnuk, translating to "at the red bank".

== History ==
Ecum Secum was home to an Englishman named John Jure (Jewers) as early as 1780 or 1790. By 1827, the area was populated by four families. A postal way office was established there on 1 September 1873, and schoolhouse was erected in 1876. St. Barnabas Anglican Church opened in Ecum Secum on 21 December 1887.

In 1868, gold was discovered in Ecum Secum, but no major mining operations began until the 1880s.

In 1956, Ecum Secum had a population of 253 people, while Ecum Secum West had a population of 195 people.

== Climate ==
Climate data for Ecum Secum
Month	Jan	Feb	Mar	Apr	May	Jun	Jul	Aug	Sep	Oct	Nov	Dec	Year
Record high °C (°F)	13.3 (55.9)	12.2 (54.0)	15 (59)	22.5 (72.5)	26.1 (79.0)	30.6 (87.1)	32.2 (90.0)	30.6 (87.1)	28.9 (84.0)	25 (77)	21.7 (71.1)	13.3 (55.9)	32.2 (90.0)
Mean daily maximum °C (°F)	−0.6 (30.9)	−0.7 (30.7)	2.6 (36.7)	6.6 (43.9)	11.2 (52.2)	16 (61)	19.2 (66.6)	20.6 (69.1)	18.1 (64.6)	12.7 (54.9)	7.4 (45.3)	2.4 (36.3)	9.6 (49.3)
Mean daily minimum °C (°F)	−9.7 (14.5)	−9.6 (14.7)	−5.3 (22.5)	−0.7 (30.7)	3.2 (37.8)	7.6 (45.7)	11.5 (52.7)	12.6 (54.7)	9.1 (48.4)	4 (39)	−0.1 (31.8)	−6.3 (20.7)	1.4 (34.5)
Record low °C (°F)	−26.1 (−15.0)	−33 (−27)	−28.5 (−19.3)	−12.8 (9.0)	−9.4 (15.1)	−3.9 (25.0)	2 (36)	1 (34)	−2.2 (28.0)	−7 (19)	−15 (5)	−25 (−13)	−33 (−27)
Average precipitation mm (inches)	145.1 (5.71)	106.3 (4.19)	132 (5.2)	119.9 (4.72)	133.3 (5.25)	121.6 (4.79)	121.3 (4.78)	124.8 (4.91)	98.1 (3.86)	122.4 (4.82)	145.6 (5.73)	170.9 (6.73)	1,541.3 (60.68)
Source: Environment Canada
