= East Quoddy, Nova Scotia =

Community in Nova Scotia, Canada

Coordinates: 44°55′5.6″N 62°19′59.3″W

East Quoddy in Nova Scotia

In 1972, four Black Brant sounding rockets were launched from East Quoddy

East Quoddy is a rural community on the Eastern Shore of Nova Scotia, Canada, in the Halifax Regional Municipality. The community is situated on the Marine Drive along Nova Scotia Trunk 7 about 21 km (13 mi) east of Sheet Harbour, Nova Scotia. It can be found along the eastern shore of Quoddy Harbour, an inlet of the Atlantic Ocean.
