= West Quoddy, Nova Scotia =

Community in Nova Scotia, Canada

Coordinates: 44°55′4.5″N 62°21′11.2″W

West Quoddy in Nova Scotia

West Quoddy is a rural community on the Eastern Shore of Nova Scotia, Canada, in the Halifax Regional Municipality. It is located along the Marine Drive on Nova Scotia Trunk 7 about 19 km (12 mi) east of Sheet Harbour, Nova Scotia. The community is located at the mouth of the Quoddy River and the head of Quoddy Harbour. Several small islands are located in the harbour.

Settlement of the area began around 1820. The modern-day name for the settlement is derived from the mi'kmaq name for the area, Noodakwade, meaning "the seal hunting place". The settlement was previously known as West Newdy Quoddy, an anglicized version of the native name. Several variations of the name of the community were used as well, including Noody Quoddy, Noody Quoday and Newdiquoddy. A Presbyterian church was opened on October 19, 1873, and a Baptist church was built in the community in 1954 and dedicated on July 19 of the same year. A schoolhouse was built in 1876 and a new school was built in 1945.

The headwaters of Quoddy River are the Chain Lakes, at an approximate elevation of 100 m (330 ft), about 17 km (11 mi) northwest of the community. The river progresses southeast-ward, passing through Quoddy Lake, as well as the Fourth and Third Lakes. The river continues in its general direction and flows through the Second and First Lakes before culminating in The Bridges Pool and flowing under Trunk 7 and into Quoddy Harbour.
