= Port Dufferin, Nova Scotia =

Community in Nova Scotia, Canada

Port Dufferin
- Location within Nova Scotia
- Coordinates: 44°54′N 62°23′W
- Country: Canada
- Province: Nova Scotia
- Municipality: Halifax Regional Municipality
- District: 2

Government
  - Type: Regional Council
  - Governing Council: Halifax Regional Council
  - Community Council: Marine Drive Valley and Canal Community Council
- Time zone: UTC-4 (AST)
  - Summer (DST): UTC-3 (ADT)
- Canadian Postal code: B0J 2R0
- Telephone Exchanges: 902 654
- GNBC Code: CBEKA
- Highways: Trunk 7
- Part of a series about Places in Nova Scotia

Port Dufferin is a rural community on the Eastern Shore of Nova Scotia, Canada, in the Halifax Regional Municipality. The community is located on the Marine Drive on Trunk 7 approximately 15 km (9.3 mi) east of Sheet Harbour. The community was formerly known as Salmon River and was renamed in 1899 by an Act of Parliament for Frederick Blackwood, the 1st Marquis of Dufferin and Governor General of Canada from 1872 to 1878. Settlement likely began in the early nineteenth century, and nine families lived in the area by 1827. An Anglican church began construction in the early 1840s, and was consecrated on August 11, 1852. The church was destroyed in the 1890s and a new church was built soon after, which was consecrated in late 1894. A schoolhouse was built in the 1860s. A Presbyterian church opened on March 20, 1904. A two-room school was opened in the 1940s.

Port Dufferin is situated at the mouth of Salmon River, where it empties into Beaver Harbour. The headwaters of the main river are located at Lewiston Lake, 9 km (5.6 mi) northwest of the community at an elevation of about 40 m (130 ft). Upstream from Lewiston Lake, the river segments into the West Branch and East Branch Salmon River. Downstream from the lake, the river progresses toward the southeast until it reaches its mouth at Beaver Harbour in Port Dufferin.
