= Beaver Harbour, Nova Scotia =

Community in Nova Scotia, Canada

Coordinates: 44°54′01″N 62°25′26″W

Beaver Harbour in Nova Scotia

Beaver Harbour is a rural community on the Eastern Shore of Nova Scotia, Canada, in the Halifax Regional Municipality . It is located on the Marine Drive, along Trunk 7 approximately 11 km (6.8 mi) east of Sheet Harbour, Nova Scotia. The community is located on the shores of Beaver Harbour, an inlet of the Atlantic Ocean. The mi'kmaq name for the area was Kobelawakwemoode, translating to "beaver harbour". First Nations legends relay that a large rock in the harbour was thrown by Glooscap, a powerful figure in the First Nations' legends, at the mystical beaver. The land on which the community resides was part of a five thousand acre grant given to a surveyor on July 13, 1773. Five families lived here by the 1830s, and a post office was established in the community on October 1, 1887. A Trans-Atlantic cable station is located in the community, for the former CANTAT-2 cable.
