= Spry Bay, Nova Scotia =

Community in Nova Scotia, Canada

Spry Bay
- Location within Nova Scotia
- Coordinates: 44°50′N 62°37′W
- Country: Canada
- Province: Nova Scotia
- Municipality: Halifax Regional Municipality
- District: 2
- Founded: 1818

Government
  - Type: Regional Council
  - Governing Council: Halifax Regional Council
- Time zone: UTC-4 (AST)
  - Summer (DST): UTC-3 (ADT)
- GNBC Code: CBKEJ
- Highways: Trunk 7
- Part of a series about Places in Nova Scotia

Spry Bay is a rural community on the Eastern Shore of Nova Scotia, Canada, in the Halifax Regional Municipality. The community is situated along the Marine Drive on Trunk 7 about 12 km (7.5 mi) southwest of Sheet Harbour, Nova Scotia. The community extends around the shores of Tomlee Bay, an inlet of Spry Bay, itself an inlet of the Atlantic Ocean. The mi'kmaq name for the area was Sebimkouaak, which translates to "extensive bog". Dutch families settled across the bay in 1818, and their settlement was named Dutch Town. The community is the home of the Spry Bay Campground and Cabins, as well as Taylor Head Provincial Park. The park contains sand beaches, 22 km (14 mi) of hiking trails and user facilities.
