= Stillwater, Guysborough, Nova Scotia =

Community in Nova Scotia, Canada

Coordinates: 45°10′32.1″N 61°58′33.5″W

Stillwater in Nova Scotia

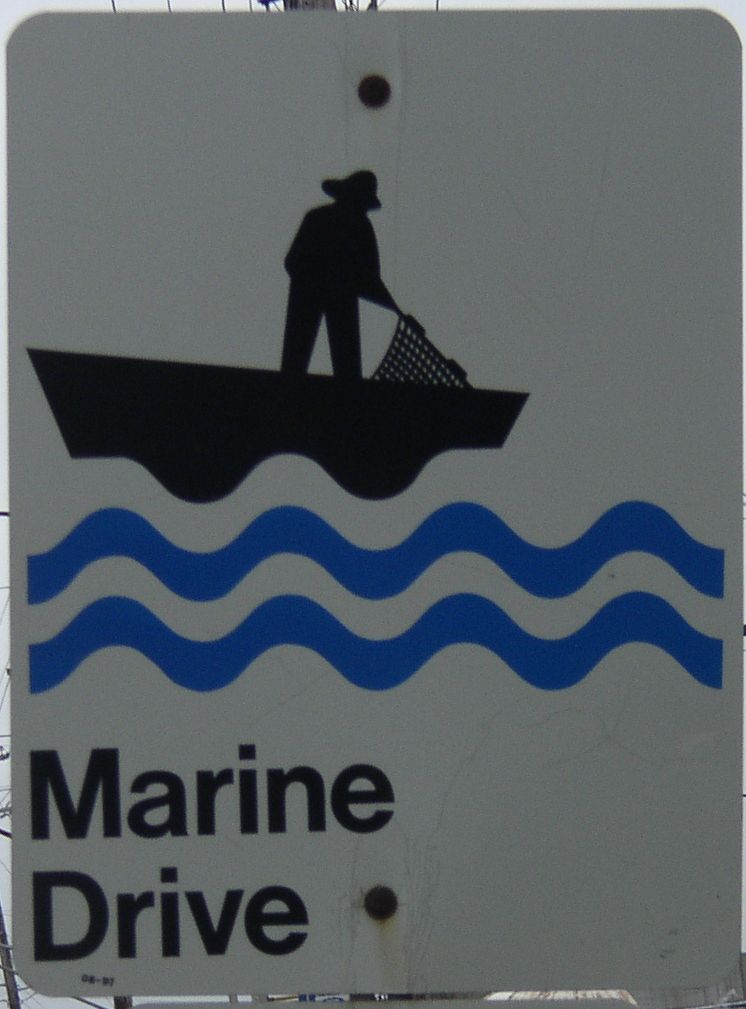
On Marine Drive

Stillwater is a small community near Sherbrooke, in the Municipality of the District of Saint Mary's Nova Scotia, Canada, with a population of about 150.

Stillwater depends on its resources, such as fish, and on agriculture. Stillwater's surroundings attract tourists to the community.

The St. Mary's River runs through Stillwater.

Stillwater has the largest population of wood turtles in the world.

Stillwater has a lot of salmon pools to fish but the population of fish has gone down 10% since 1988.

Babe Ruth frequently fished in Stillwater and stayed in its beautiful surroundings.

Stillwater has the lands and forest station for Guysborough County.
