= Oyster Pond, Nova Scotia =

Community in Nova Scotia, Canada

Coordinates: 44°46′44″N 63°00′27″W

Jeddore Oyster Ponds in Nova Scotia

Jeddore Oyster Ponds is a community on the Eastern Shore of the Halifax Regional Municipality Nova Scotia on Marine Drive on Trunk 7 49.2 Kilometers from Halifax. It lies on the northeast side of Jeddore Harbour.

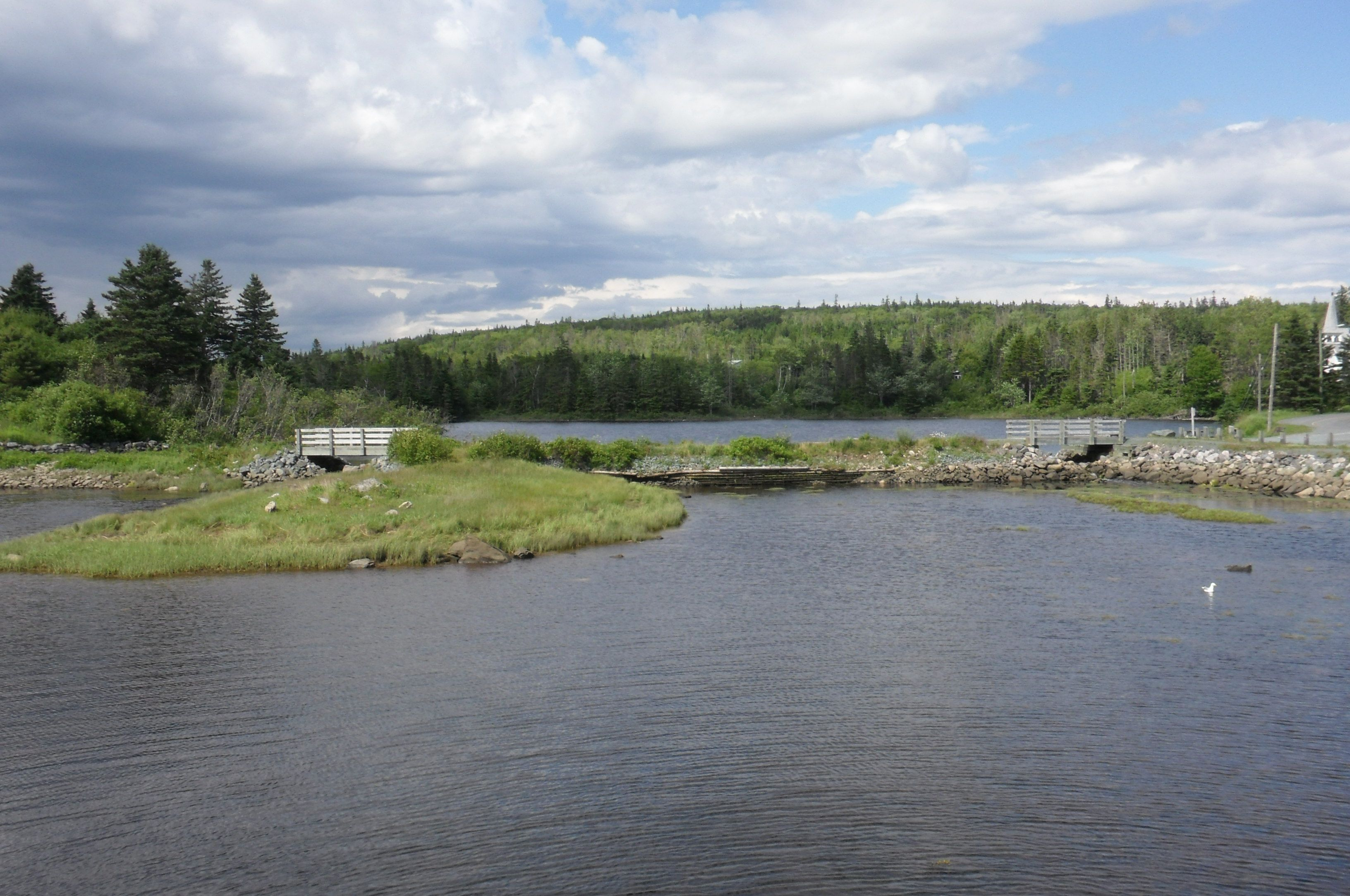
Jeddore Oyster Ponds

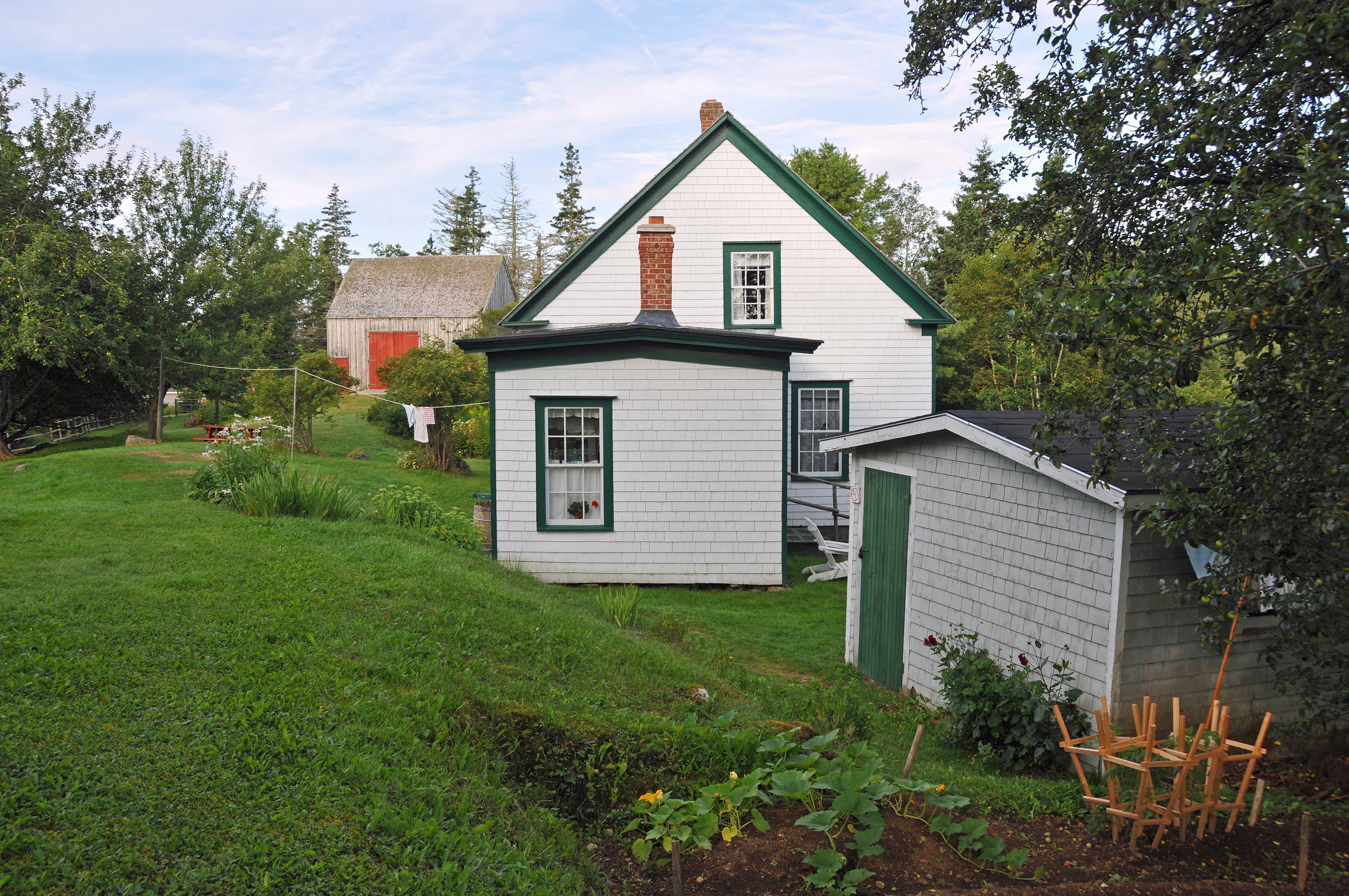
A part of the Fisherman’s Life Museum

== Museums ==
- The Fisherman’s Life Museum

== Schools ==
Oyster Pond Academy

== Demographics ==
- Total Population 195
- Total Dwellings 304
- Total Land Area 113.129 7 km^{2}

== Communications ==
- Telephone exchange 902 - 845 - 889
- Postal code - B0J 2L0
