= Liscomb Mills, Nova Scotia =

Community in Nova Scotia, Canada

Liscomb Mills in Nova Scotia

Liscomb Mills is a small community in the Canadian province of Nova Scotia, located in the Municipality of the District of Guysborough in Guysborough County. The community lies along the Marine Drive on Trunk 7. The community is home to the Liscombe Lodge Resort and Conference Centre.
