= Indian Harbour Lake, Nova Scotia =

Indian Harbour Lake
- Location of Indian Harbour Lake (lake) within Nova Scotia
- Location: Guysborough County, Nova Scotia
- Coordinates: 45.1194°N 61.8672°W
- Basin countries: Canada
- Settlements: Indian Harbour Lake

Indian Harbour Lake
- Rural community
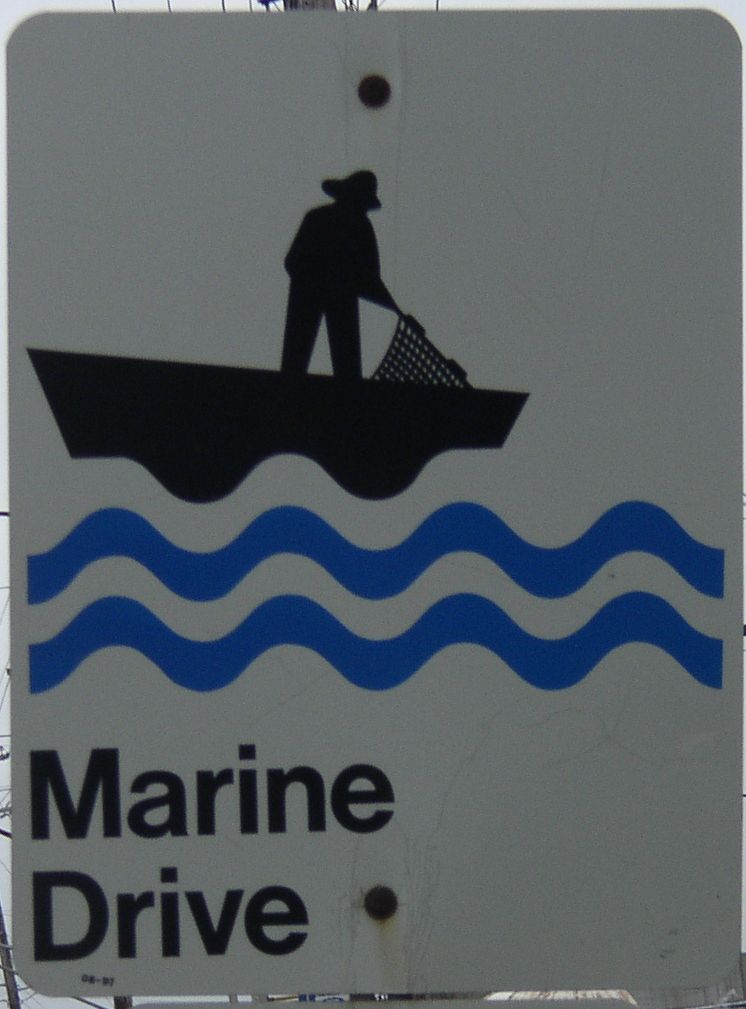
- On Marine Drive

- Location of Indian Harbour Lake (community) in Nova Scotia
- Coordinates: 45°8′1.34″N 61°52′38.38″W
- Country: Canada
- Province: Nova Scotia
- County: Guysborough County

Indian Harbour Lake is a rural community and lake of the same name located in Guysborough County Nova Scotia, Canada. It is nestled ten minutes outside of Sherbrooke (the seat of power for the District of St. Mary's), and 2.5 hours from the capital of Nova Scotia, Halifax. Seven lakes are located around Indian Harbour Lake, which are named Mitchell Lake, First Lake, Second Lake, Third Lake, Indian Harbour Lake, Monument Lake, and Archibald's Lake. Indian Harbour Lake is also located 5 minutes from the community of Port Hilfordd, which has a sand beach.

The main source of employment for people in the area is primarily forestry and fishing, but there is a restaurant located in the community as well. Over the years Indian Harbour Lake has seen the majority of its young people move to larger urban centers like Halifax or moving out to work in the Alberta Tar Sands. Though a lot of people are not giving up on the community and are still waiting for an opportunity that will bring jobs to the area.

There are two churches located in the community, an Anglican church and Pentecostal church. Both still in active service. A Community Hall, shared by Jordanville and PortHilford, is located in Indian Harbour Lake. A baseball field used to be located in the community but due to declining numbers and insurance issues it had to be torn down and replaced with a gravel pit.

Indian Harbour Lakes primary resource is trees but it also has a vast abundance of fresh water (from many different springs) and there is a possibility of gold. The surrounding areas were major gold mining centers back in the late 1800s and early 1900s, and so it is possible that Indian Harbour Lake has some gold reserves buried in the ground.
