= Port Hilford, Nova Scotia =

Community in Nova Scotia, Canada

Coordinates: 45°6′31″N 61°50′31″W

Port Hilford in Nova Scotia

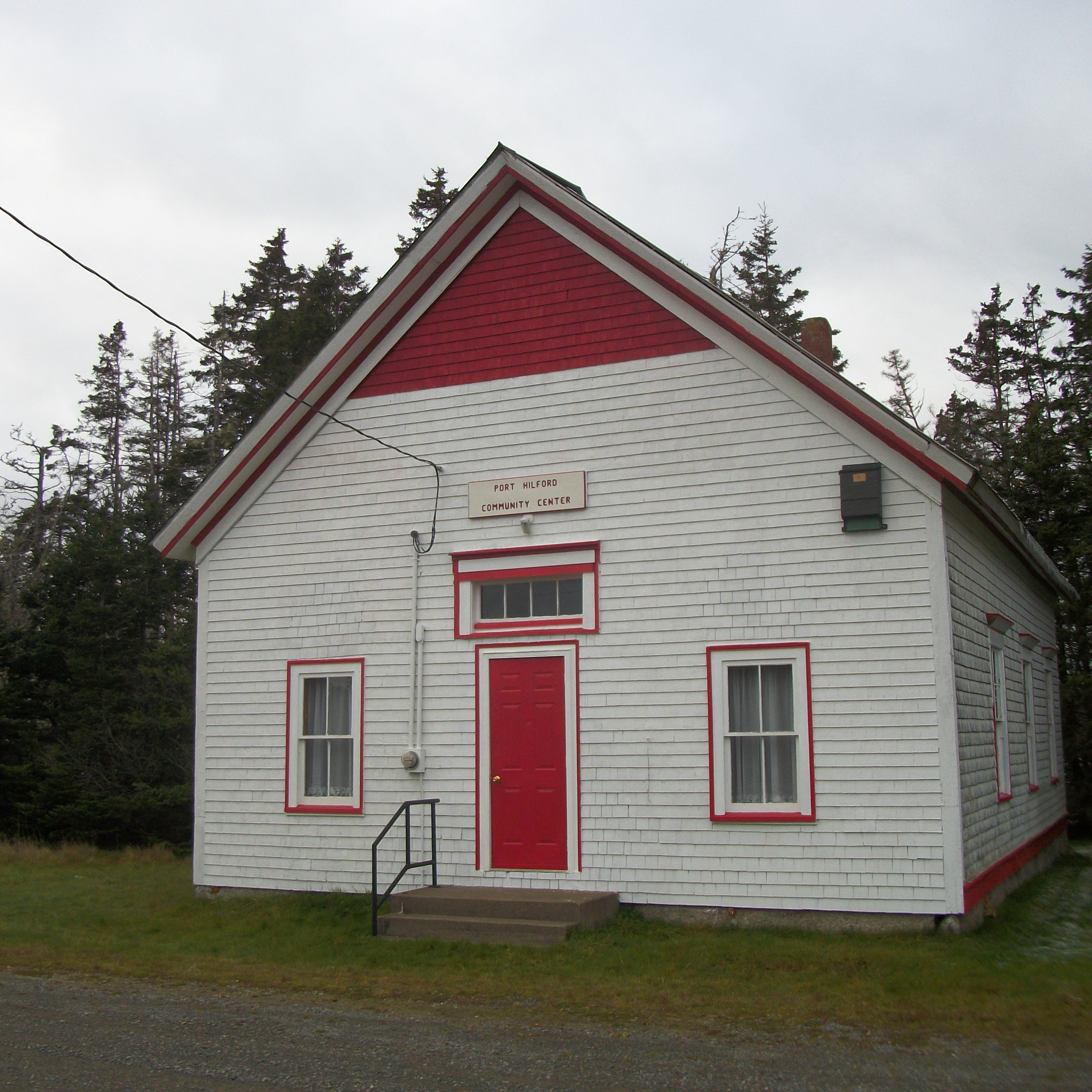
Port Hilford Community Centre, Guysborough NS

Port Hilford is a small community in the Canadian province of Nova Scotia, located in the Municipality of the District of Saint Mary's in Guysborough County. It was the birthplace of country and western singer Wilf Carter.

The place, formerly named Indian Harbour, is located at the head of Indian Harbour Bay and at the south end of Indian Harbour Lake.

In 2020 the Whale Sanctuary Project selected Port Hilford as its preferred location for a sanctuary for retired belugas and possibly orcas.
