= Taylor Head Beach =

Provincial park in Nova Scotia, Canada

Coordinates: 44°50′14.97″N 62°35′9.68″W

Taylor Head Beach

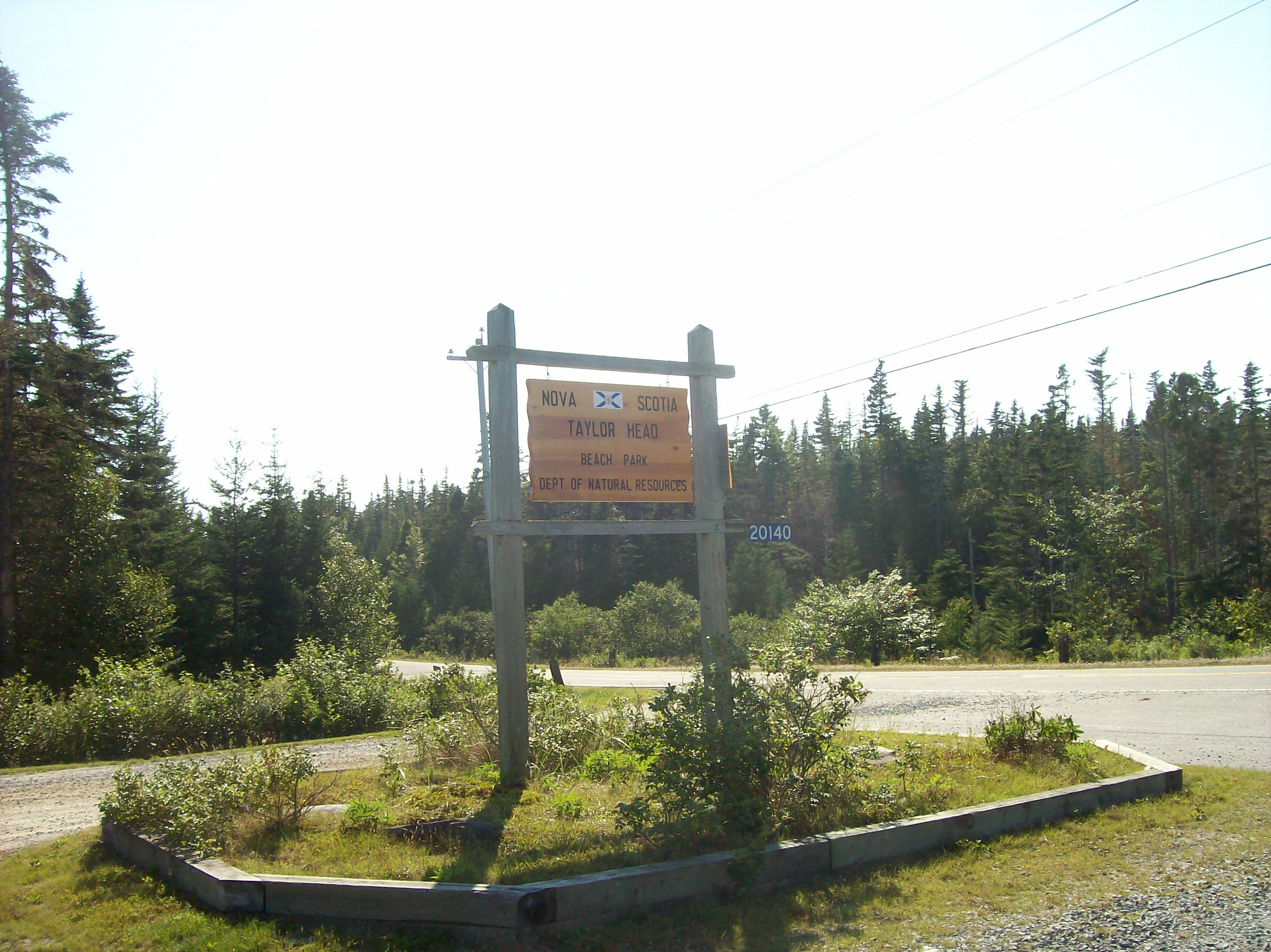
Entrance to the park.

Newcombe's Graveyard

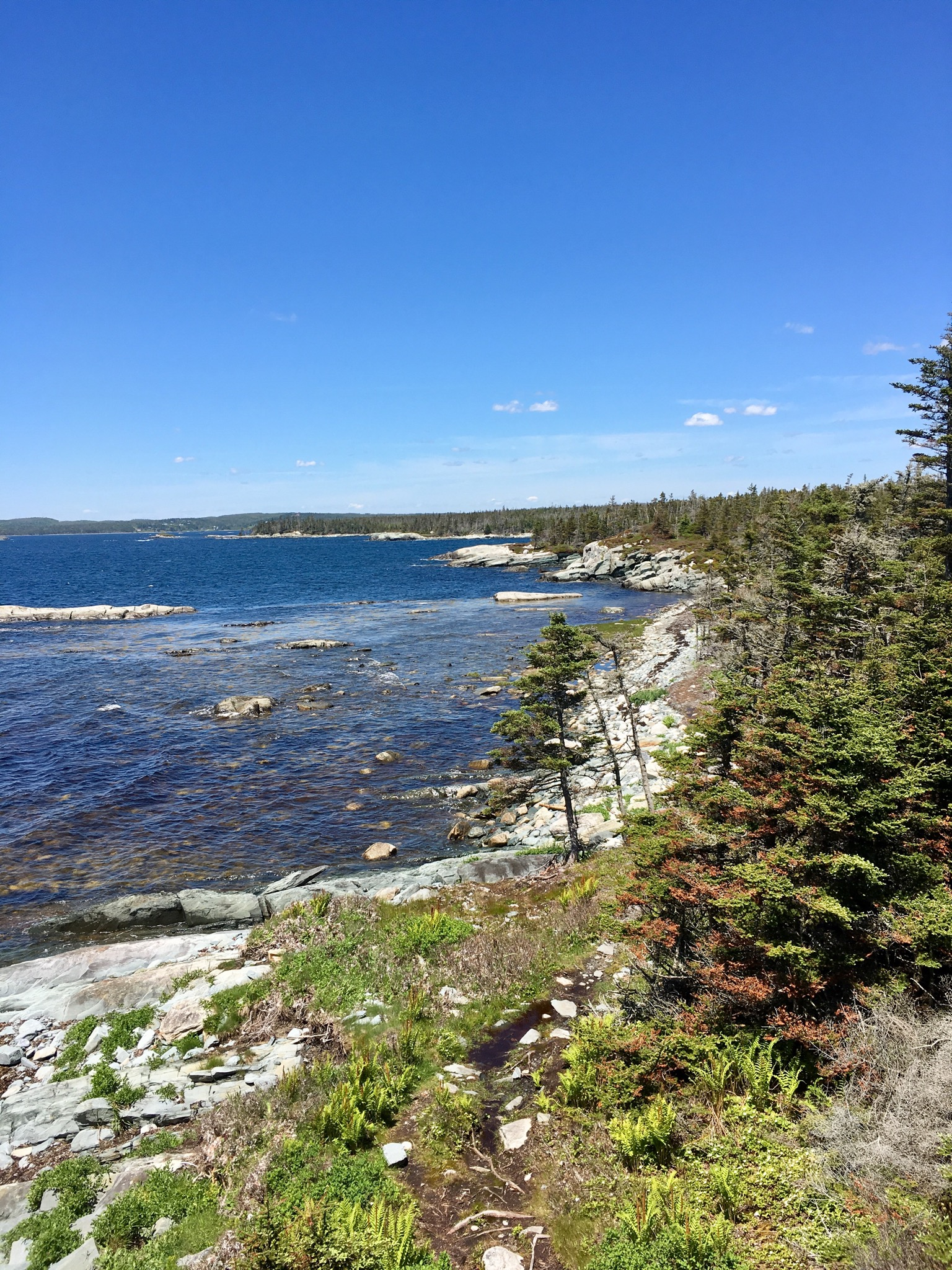
View of the coast near Taylors Point

Taylor Head Beach is a provincial park on the Eastern Shore of Nova Scotia, Canada. It is located 11 km (6.8 mi) southwest of Sheet Harbour, near the community of Spry Bay.

The park has 1 km (0.62 mi) of sandy beach and 22 km (14 mi) of scenic hiking trails, varying in length and difficulty. The trails are rugged. There are also many geological features and natural habitats within the park. Taylor Head Beach is one of the few places in Nova Scotia that has sand volcanoes. Hunting is forbidden inside the park borders. Two or three sailors drowned off the coast of Taylor Head and are buried there. There is a sign at their place of burial.

== Trails ==
Trail	Length (km)	Length (mi)	Difficulty	Notes
Beach Walk	1	0.62	Easy	
Bob Bluff Trail	3	1.9	Moderate	
Spry Bay Trail	4	2.5	Moderate	Loop trail.
Bull Beach Trail	6	3.7	Moderate	
Headland Trail	8	5.0	Challenging	Loop trail.
