= Isaacs Harbour North, Nova Scotia =

Community in Nova Scotia, Canada

Coordinates: 45°12′12.42″N 61°40′22.64″W

Isaacs Harbour North in Nova Scotia

Isaacs Harbour North is a community in the Canadian province of Nova Scotia, located in the Municipality of the District of Guysborough in Guysborough County.

Located just north of Isaacs Harbour, Isaacs Harbour North is a friendly hamlet that if you're lost, or have a flat, the folk will go out of their way to help you. With a population less than 50 residents, Isaacs Harbour North has no leverage on its larger neighbouring communities.

== Attractions ==
To the north is the Isaacs Harbour River. This is a political divide separating the prosperous community of Goldboro (named after the gold reserves that once made the community very popular) with Isaacs Harbour North. A local swimming hole called, "The Falls" is perhaps the most known feature of the river. Historically the Isaacs Harbour River has been used for power generation, fishing and milling. Approximately 10 km upstream is a crossing of the Maritimes & Northeast Natural Gas Pipeline transporting processed natural gas from the ExxonMobil onshore plant in Goldboro to the Northeast US market.

== Transportation ==
Isaacs Harbour North is connected to Nova Scotia's Marine Drive on Route 316. The route is popular with cyclist and motorcyclist with sparse traffic, scenery and small villages. Route 316 takes two very sharp turns through Isaacs Harbour North which in the past has caused some traffic issues. The highlight being the infamous "corner" an intersection that connects Isaacs Harbour North with Isaacs Harbour.

== Fire Hall ==
Isaacs Harbour North won the right to form the headquarters for the Harbourview District Fire Department. The new hall includes a two-bay garage for emergency vehicles, staff office facility, showers, common area and a fully equipped kitchen area. The hall is used regularly by community organizations for fundraisers, is a polling station for elections and a hub for local activity. The fire hall is the largest red building in Isaacs Harbour North and the only building with a front-facing attached garage.

== Weather ==
Isaacs Harbour North experiences a marine climate throughout the year also known as fog. While fog is very common during the summer months Isaacs Harbour North is blessed with significantly more sunlight than the following communities: Port Bickerton, Drumhead, Seal Harbour, Coddle's Harbour, Tor Bay, Charlos Cove, Cole Harbour, Ecum Secum, Marie Joseph, Little Liscomb, Fisherman's Harbour. and that unnamed place between Goldboro and Drumhead. The argument could be made Isaacs Harbour North also has more sunlight than: New Harbour, Larry's River, Harrpellville, Whitehead and Jersey Shores.
