= Eastern Shore (Nova Scotia) =

Region of Nova Scotia

Coordinates: 44°55′N 62°20′W

- Economic Region
- Interactive map of Eastern Shore
- Country: Canada
- Province: Nova Scotia
- Time zone: UTC-4 (AST)
  - Summer (DST): UTC-3 (ADT)
- Area codes: 782, 902

The Eastern Shore is a region of the Canadian province of Nova Scotia. It is the Atlantic coast running northeast from Halifax Harbour to the eastern end of the peninsula at the Strait of Canso.

== History ==
Canso, along with Annapolis Royal, Halifax, and Lunenburg, are some of North America's earliest settlements. The Battle at Jeddore (1722) is one of the many historic events to occur along the shore.

A railway had been proposed during the 1880s to run east from Dartmouth, however the sparse settlement and lack of industrial economic activity saw the railway line swing north up the Musquodoboit River at Musquodoboit Harbour to access the fertile agricultural district of the Musquodoboit Valley. Another railway project was proposed to run between Pictou and the village of Guysborough and on to Canso during the age of sail, when Canso rivalled Halifax as the most important first port of call in Nova Scotia for westbound trans-Atlantic vessels, as Canso was roughly the same distance by rail from the New Brunswick–Nova Scotia border as Halifax. A rail line was eventually graded and bridges constructed between Pictou and Guysborough during the 1930s, however, tracks were never laid and the project was abandoned, leaving most of the Eastern Shore without rail service.

During the post-World War II period, the provincial government upgraded local roads, that resulted in the present alignment of Trunk 7.

During the 1980s-90s, when the rail line was abandoned, the controlled-access Nova Scotia Highway 107 was built from the Burnside Industrial Park in Dartmouth to Musquodoboit Harbour, to assist commuters and truck-traffic that travels to rural Municipal Halifax and to Highway 102 via Highway 118.

A 1990s regional development project saw the port of Sheet Harbour redeveloped into an important regional deep-water port. The facility is most heavily used during the winter months, when the Northumberland Strait port of Pictou is iced-in and industrial shippers from Pictou County truck shipments to Sheet Harbour. A large industrial greenhouse, sawmill operation, and wharf, are also located on site. Beaver Harbour was home to a trans-Atlantic cable station which was operated by Teleglobe, but is now decommissioned.

== Geography ==
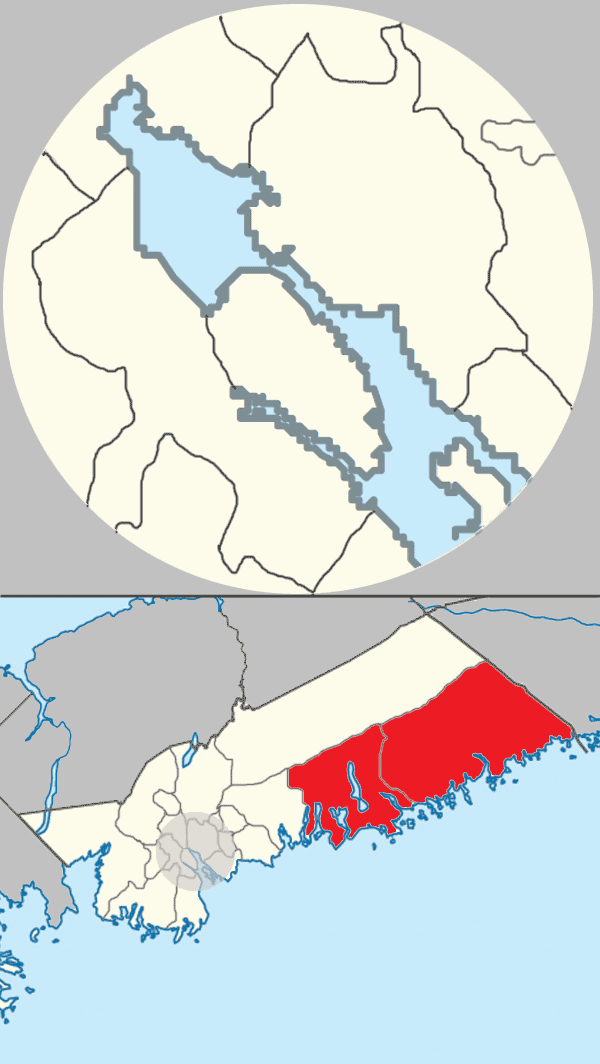
A map of east and west Eastern Shore planning areas in Halifax, Nova Scotia

Most of the Eastern Shore of Nova Scotia consists of sandstone and shale bedrock, forming rolling hills, which are up to 75 metres (246 ft) in elevation and many offshore islands, of which two of the largest are Wolfes Island and Barren Island. The Eastern Shore is heavily forested. Approximately 12 kilometres (7.5 mi) inland from the coast is the Eastern Shore Granite Ridge. This is an expansive area of 350-million-year-old granite bedrock.

=== Waterways ===
Several major rivers flow into the coast along the Eastern Shore, including the Musquodoboit River, which flows into the Musquodoboit Harbour, Jeddore Harbour, Tangier River, which flows from Tangier Grand Lake to the Atlantic, West River Sheet Harbour, which flows into the Northwest Arm of Sheet Harbour, as well as East River Sheet Harbour into the Northeast Arm. The St. Mary's River also flows into the Atlantic, passing through the community of Sherbrooke. There are many lakes, ponds, flowages and other types of freshwater bodies along the Eastern Shore. The largest of which are Porters Lake, which flows almost directly into the Atlantic Ocean, Lake Charlotte, which flows into Ship Harbour via the Ship Harbour River and Tangier Grand Lake, which flows into the Atlantic Ocean via the Tangier River.

The largest water formation by far is the Chedabucto Bay, at the eastern end of the Eastern Shore. There also numerous, albeit much smaller, bays, harbours and other coastal features along the Eastern Shore, including but not limited to: Musquodoboit Harbour, Jeddore Harbour, Ship Harbour, Sheet Harbour, Country Harbour, Tor Bay and Guysborough Harbour.

The Eastern Shore is a scenic, yet sparsely settled area, hosting dozens of small fishing harbours and communities; in recent decades the region has become home to a growing number of cottages and recreational properties, given the number of unspoiled sandy beaches and dramatic coastlines. The shore also hosts the majority of Nova Scotia's small islands. The tourism industry is concentrated near popular beaches and provincial parks such as Lawrencetown, Clam Harbour, and Martinique, as well as the centrally located service communities of Musquodoboit Harbour, Sheet Harbour, Sherbrooke, Canso, Guysborough and Mulgrave. Popular tourist attractions include the Liscombe Lodge resort and conference centre in Liscomb Mills and the Historic Sherbrooke Village in Sherbrooke.

== Demographics ==
The area between Cape Breton-and-Dartmouth is sparsely populated, however, there are more than 300 communities along the Eastern Shore, which vary in size.

The decline in the fishing industry has meant an outflow of people to larger urban areas and other fishing villages in the province. Guysborough and Canso, with populations of 922 and 820 respectively, are the largest communities.

=== Communities ===
Although these are not all of the communities in the Eastern Shore, these are some of the most populated.

- Canso
- Guysborough
- Head of Chezzetcook
- Head of Jeddore
- Musquodobout Harbour
- Port Dufferin
- Sheet Harbour
- Ship Harbour
- Spanish Ship Bay
- Tangier
- Porters Lake, Nova Scotia
- Musquodoboit Harbour, Nova Scotia
- Preston, Nova Scotia
- Lawrencetown, Nova Scotia

=== Municipalities ===
- Eastern Municipality of Halifax
- Guysborough
- St. Mary's

== Economy ==
Most of the economy along the Eastern Shore is based around fishing, forestry and tourism, with an industrial port in Sheet Harbour as well.

Numerous lumber mills operated here during the early 1900s as Nova Scotia entered the industrial revolution.

=== Tourism ===
Tourism is becoming an increasingly active industry along the Eastern Shore.

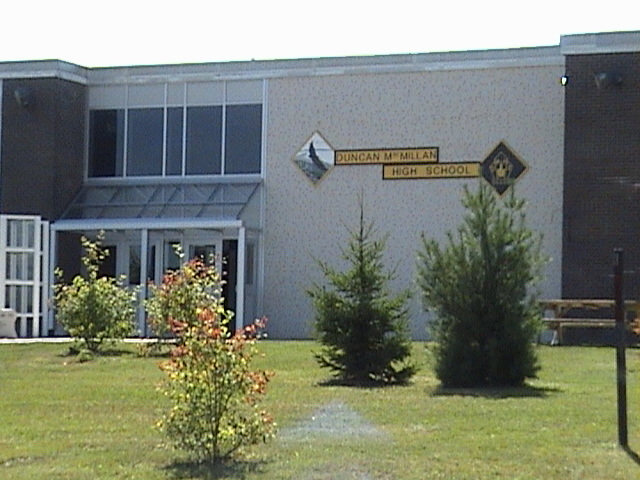
Duncan MacMillan High School

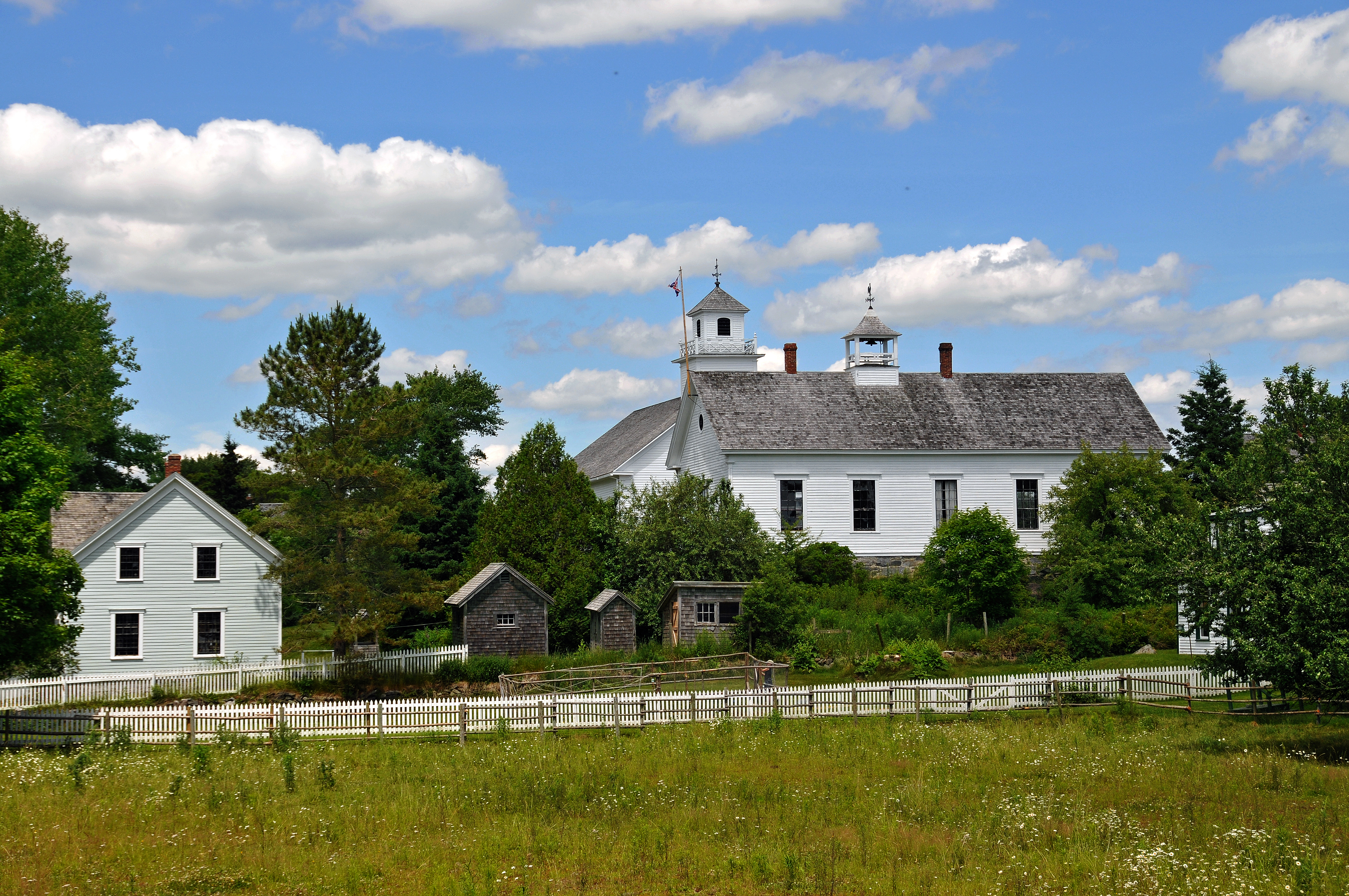
Sherbrooke Village

There is a Fisherman's Life Museum in Jeddore Oyster Ponds. There is trout fishing and Atlantic salmon serves as a sport in rivers along the coast. In Eastern Passage, there is a Fishermen's Cove tourist attraction with a few stores. There is an interactive museum located in Sherbrooke, Nova Scotia. It is called the Historic Sherbrooke Village and it depicts life around the 1900s in the village. The longest beaches on the Eastern Shore are Lawrencetown Beach, in Lawrencetown, Martinique Beach, near Musquodoboit Harbour and Taylor Head Beach, located in Spry Bay, within the boundaries of Taylor Head Provincial Park.

== Transportation ==
Roads

- Highway 107
- Route 211
- Route 224
- Route 316
- Route 344
- Route 357
- Route 374
- Trunk 7
- Trunk 16

== Education ==
All schools within the Eastern Shore, except St. Mary's Education Centre, are administered by the Halifax Regional Centre for Education. St. Mary's Education Centre is administered by the Strait Regional School Board.

Elementary Schools

- O'Connell Drive Elementary School (Porter's Lake)
- Porters Lake Elementary (Porter's Lake)
- Sheet Harbour Consolidated School (Sheet Harbour)
- St. Mary's Education Centre (Sherbrooke)

High Schools

- Duncan MacMillan High School (Sheet Harbour)
- Eastern Shore District High School (Musquodoboit Harbour)

Junior High Schools

- Gaetz Brook Junior High School (Gaetz Brook)
- Oyster Pond Academy (Jeddore Oyster Ponds)

There are nine schools along the Eastern Shore. Most are located in the larger communities. and Saint Mary's Education Centre/Academy (SMECA), in Sherbrooke.

A new school in Sheet Harbour is currently being built in the former site of Duncan MacMillan High School and Sheet Harbour Consolidated School. It is a merge of the schools Duncan MacMillan High School, Sheet Harbour Consolidated School, Lakefront Consolidated Elementary and Eastern Consolidated School.There is a possibility that both schools in Sheet Harbour, as well as Lakefront Consolidated School in Tangier, will be closed and merged into one P-12 school in the next few years.

== Gallery ==
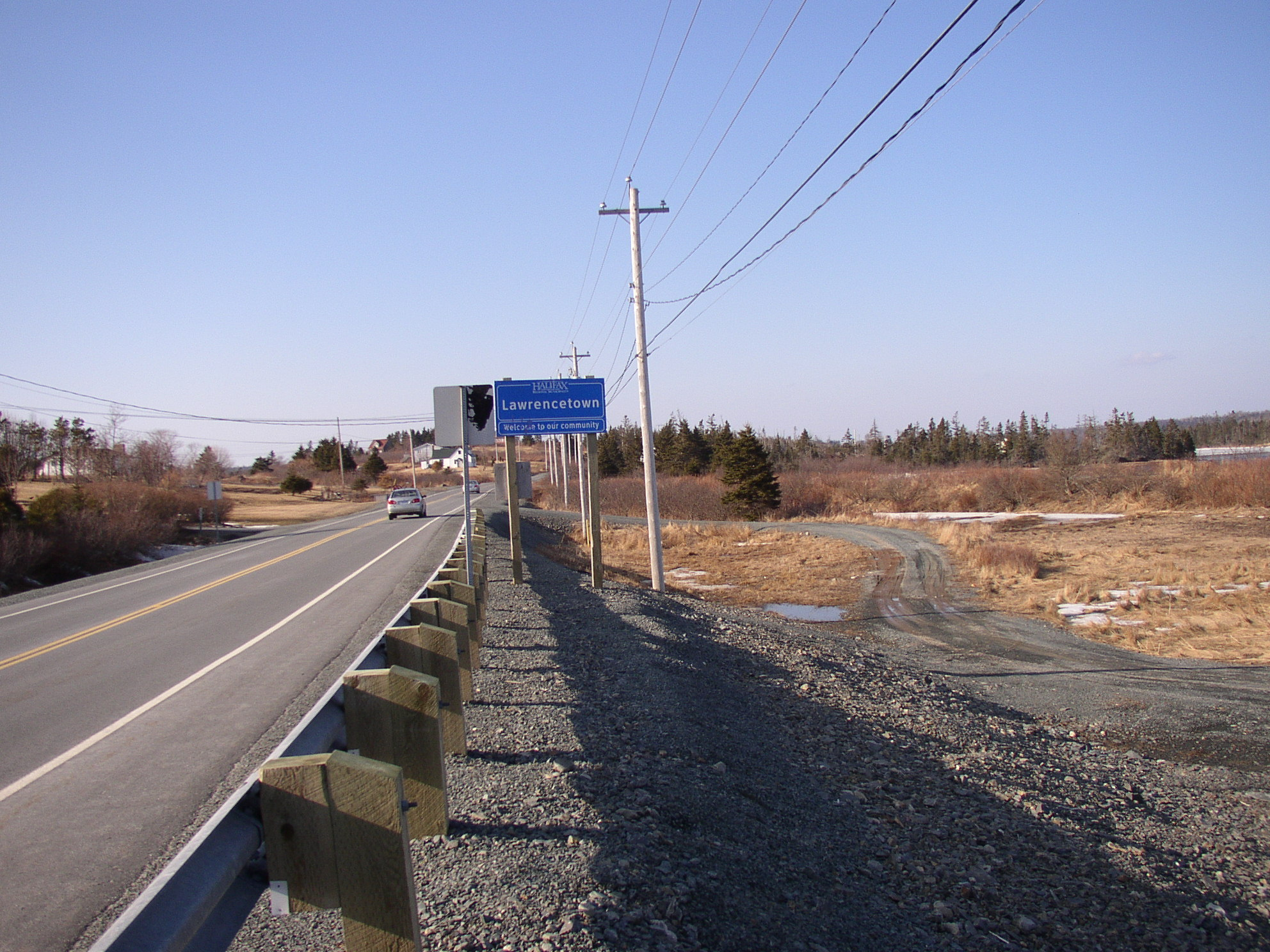
Lawrencetown

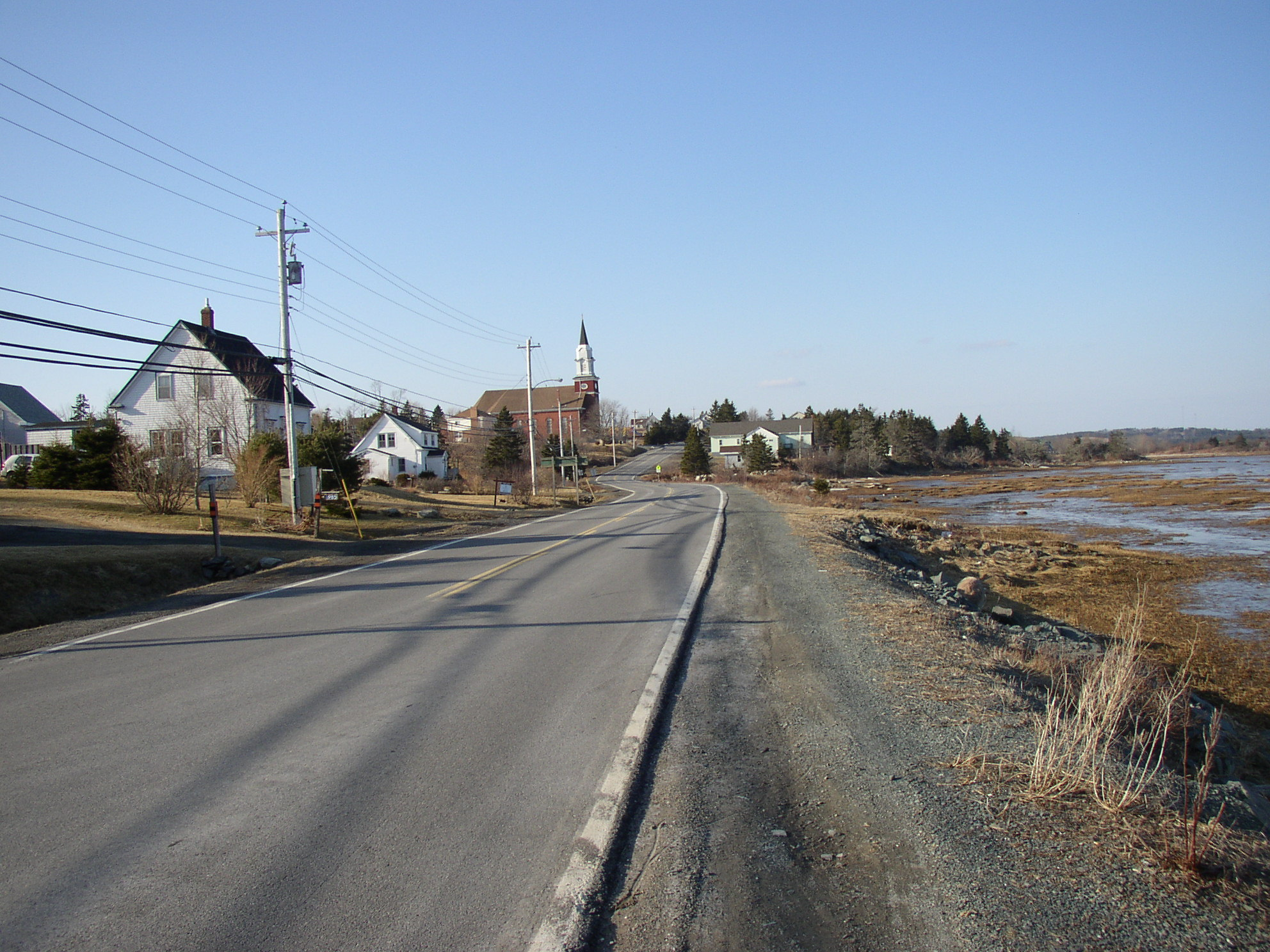
West Chezzetcook

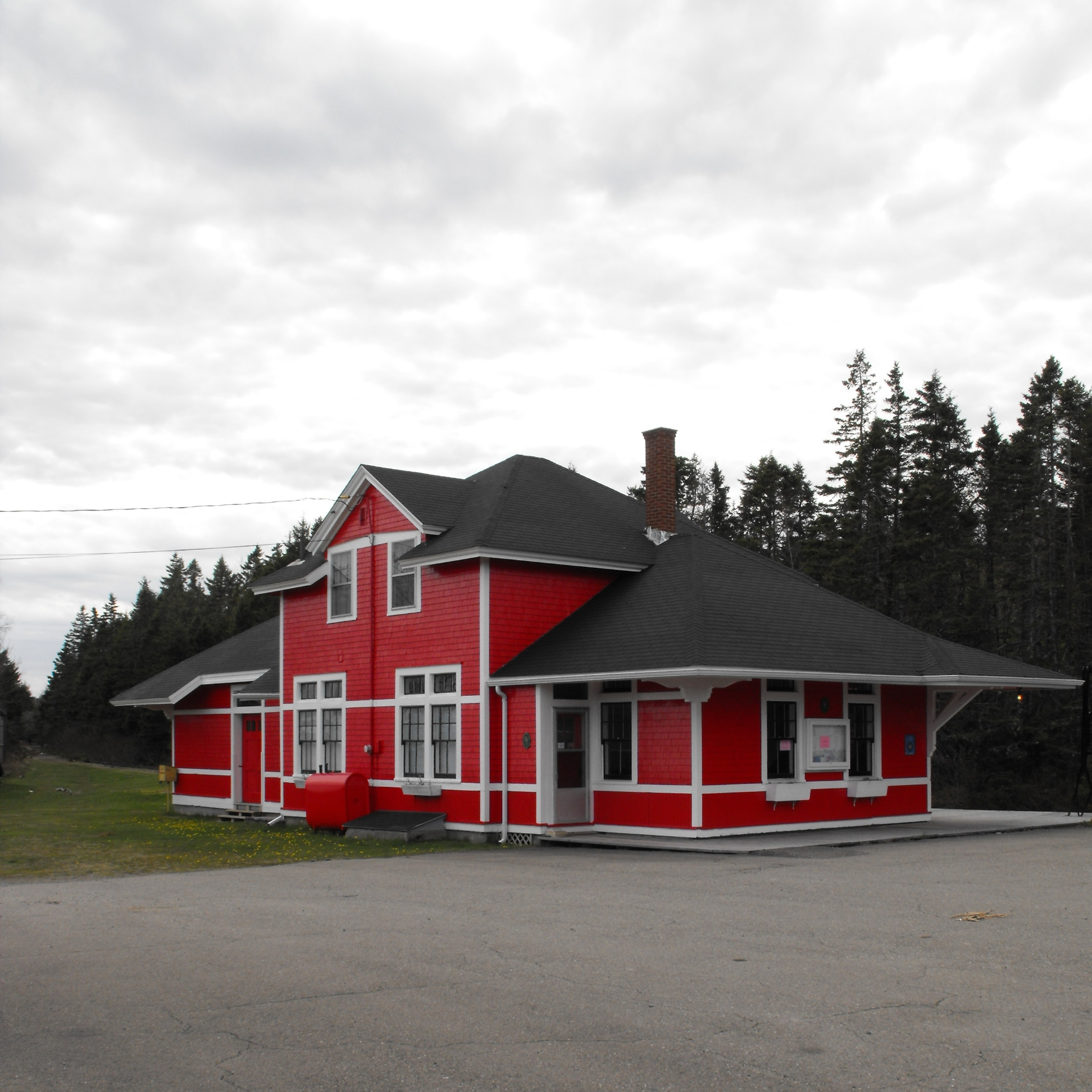
Musquodoboit Harbour

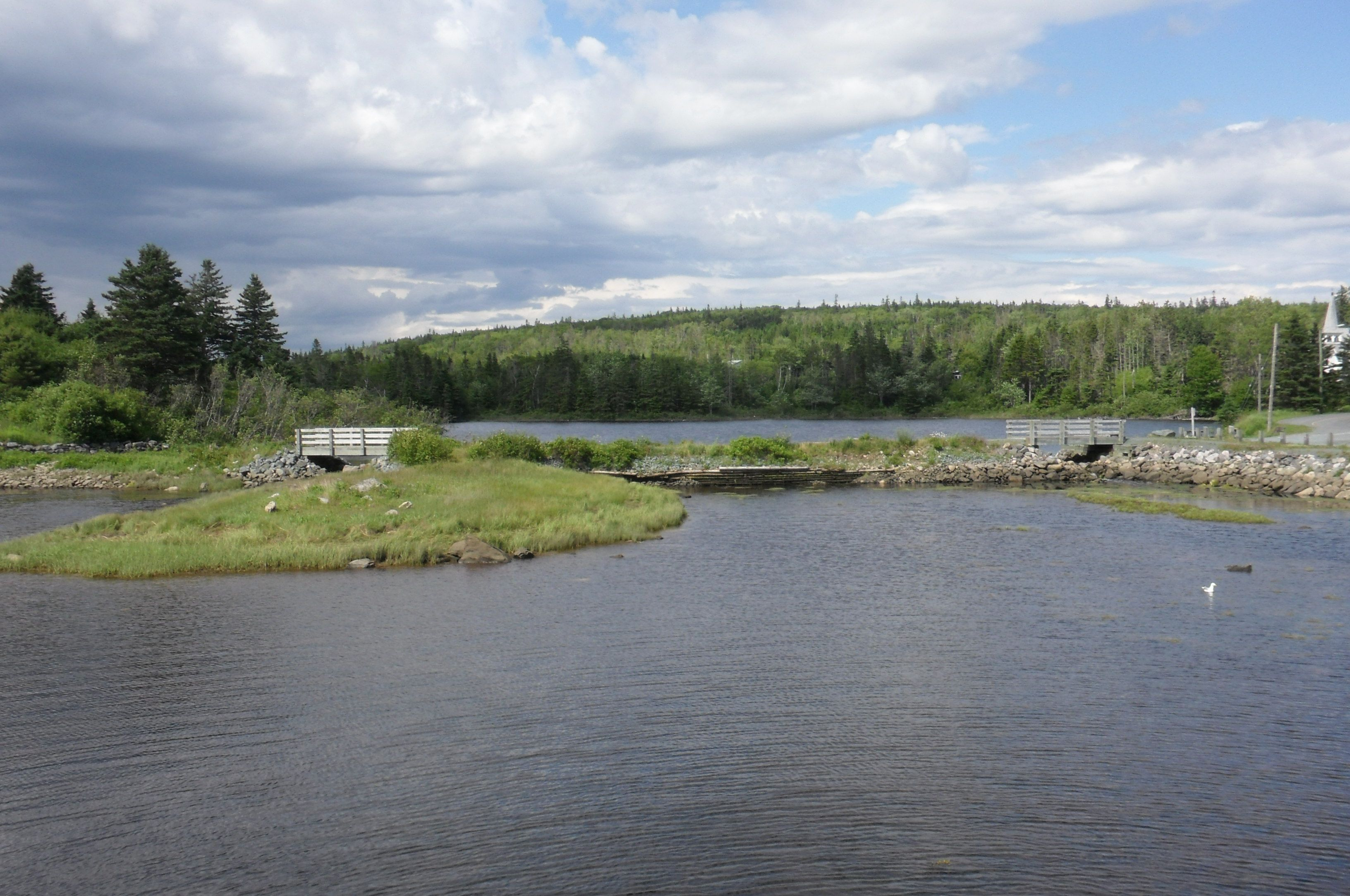
Jeddore Oyster Ponds
Rural Halifax Regional Municipality

Sheet Harbour

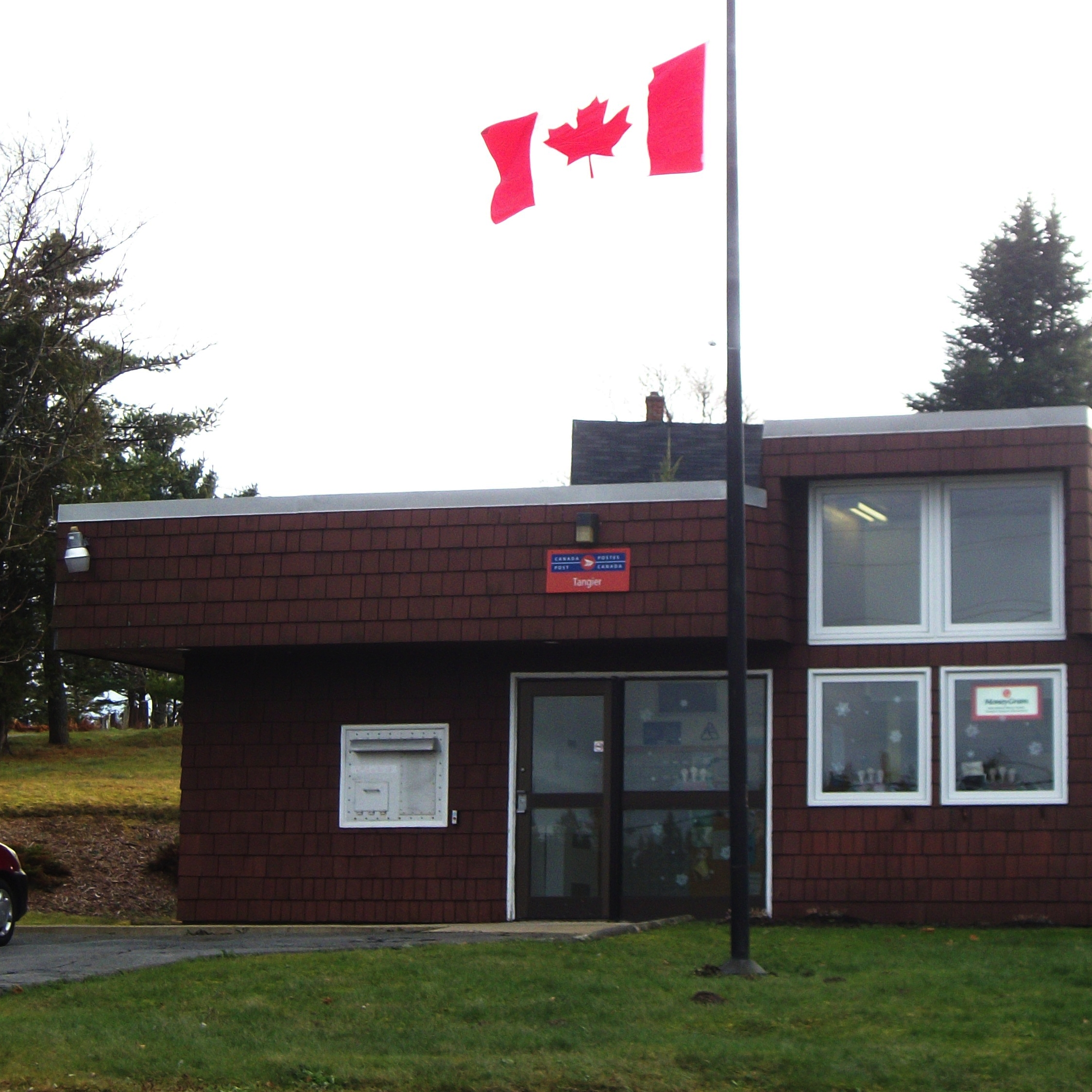
Tangier

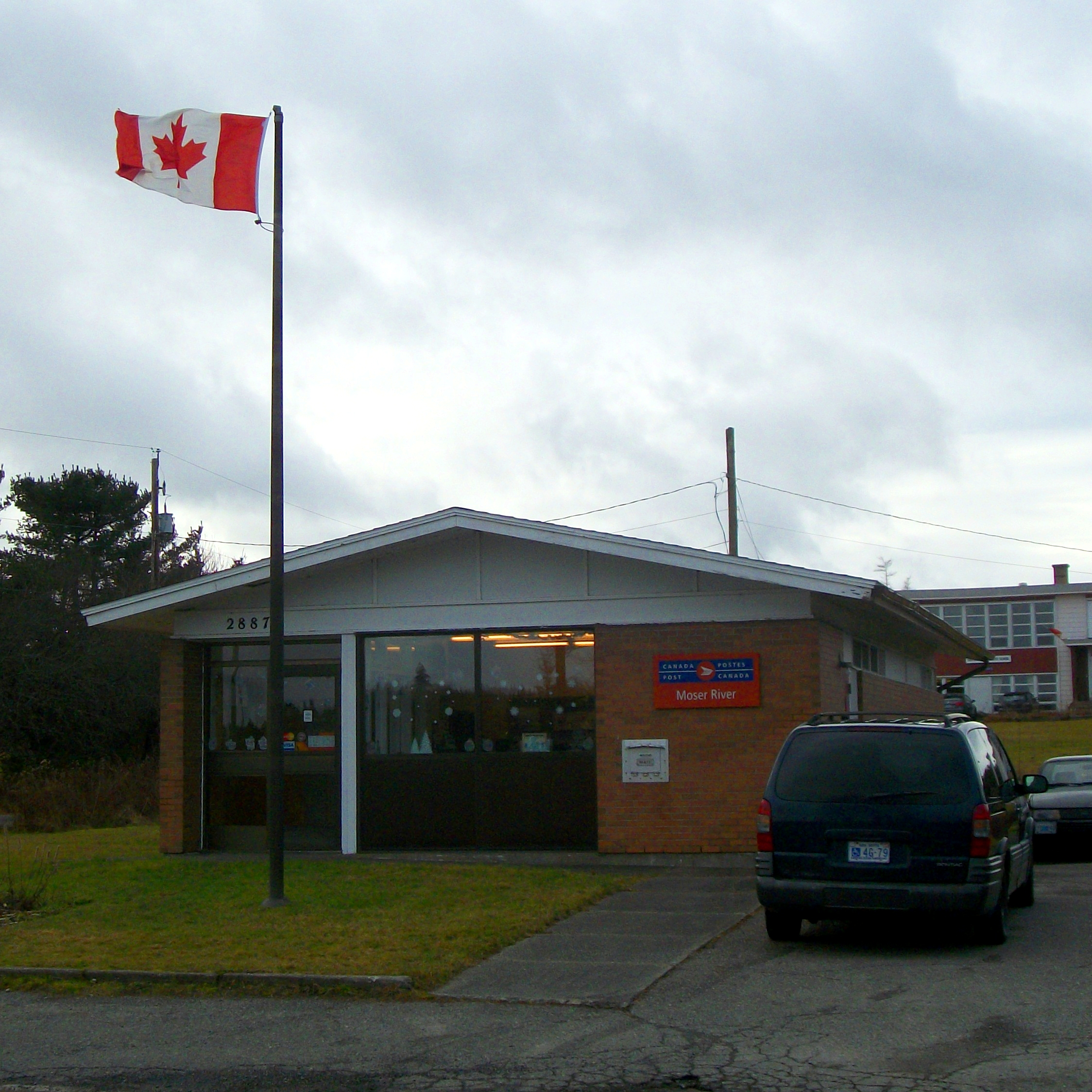
Moser River
Guysborough County

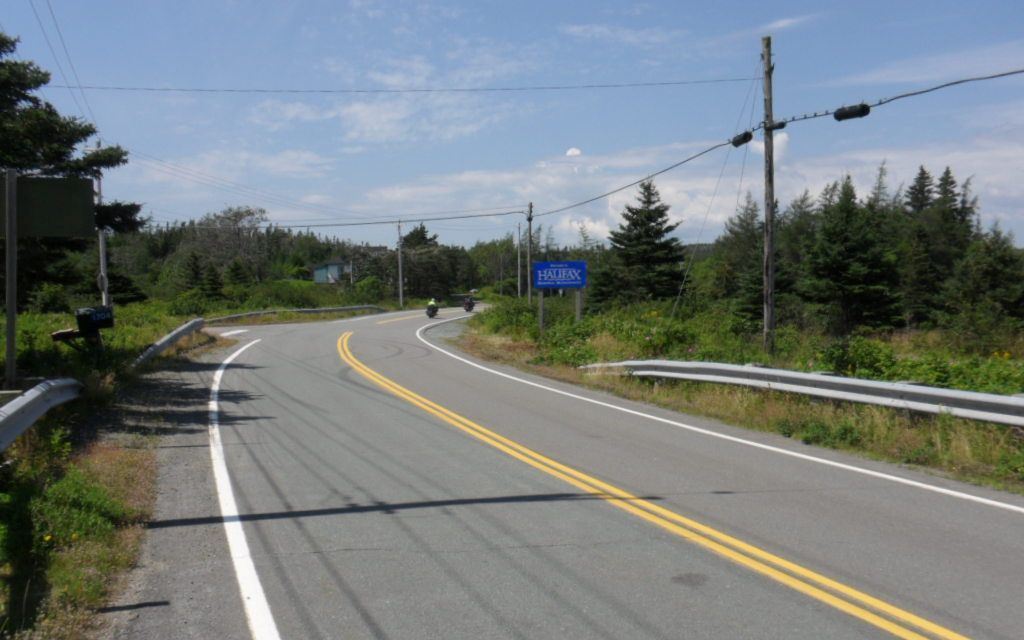
Ecum Secum

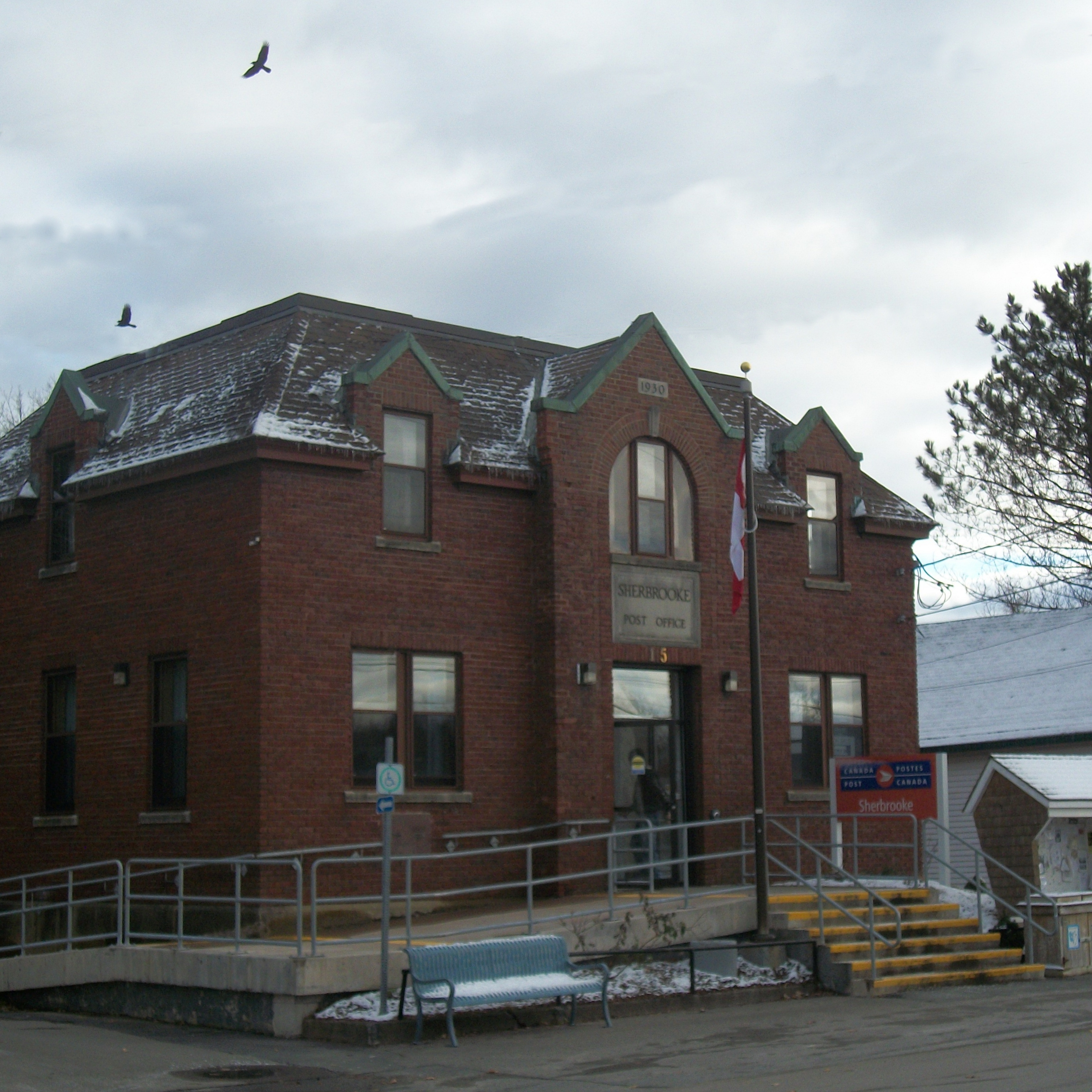
Sherbrooke

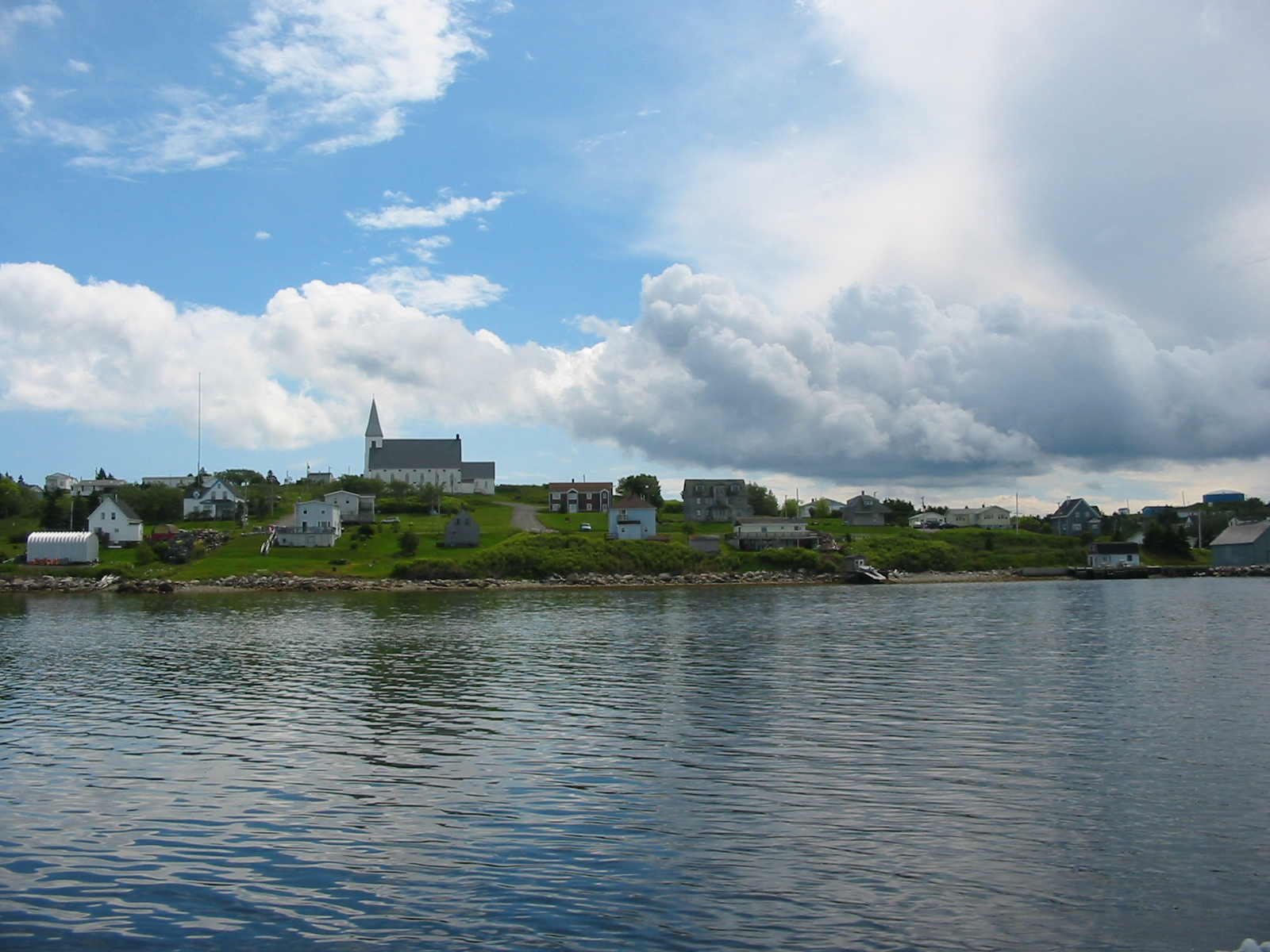
Canso

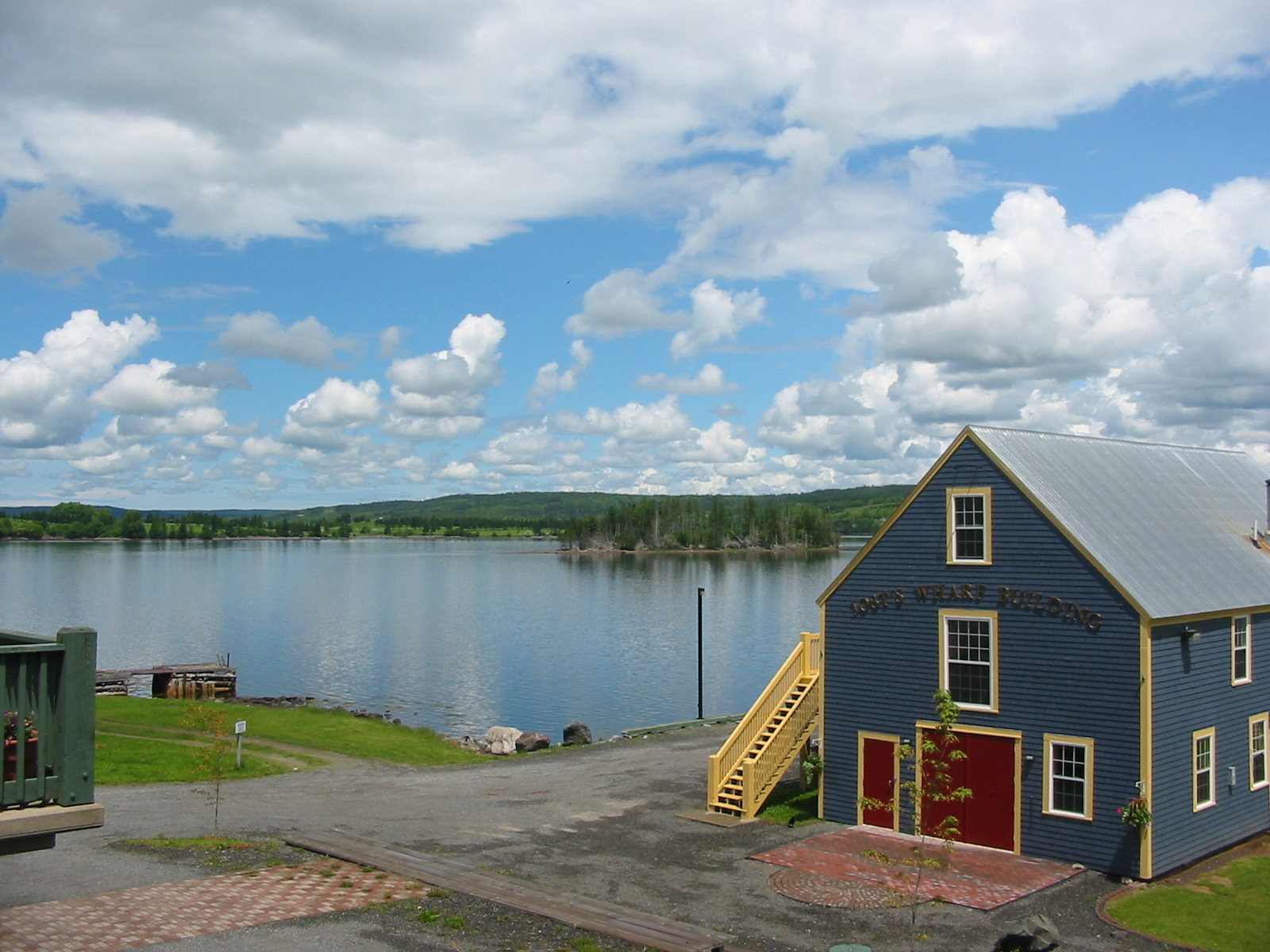
Guysborough

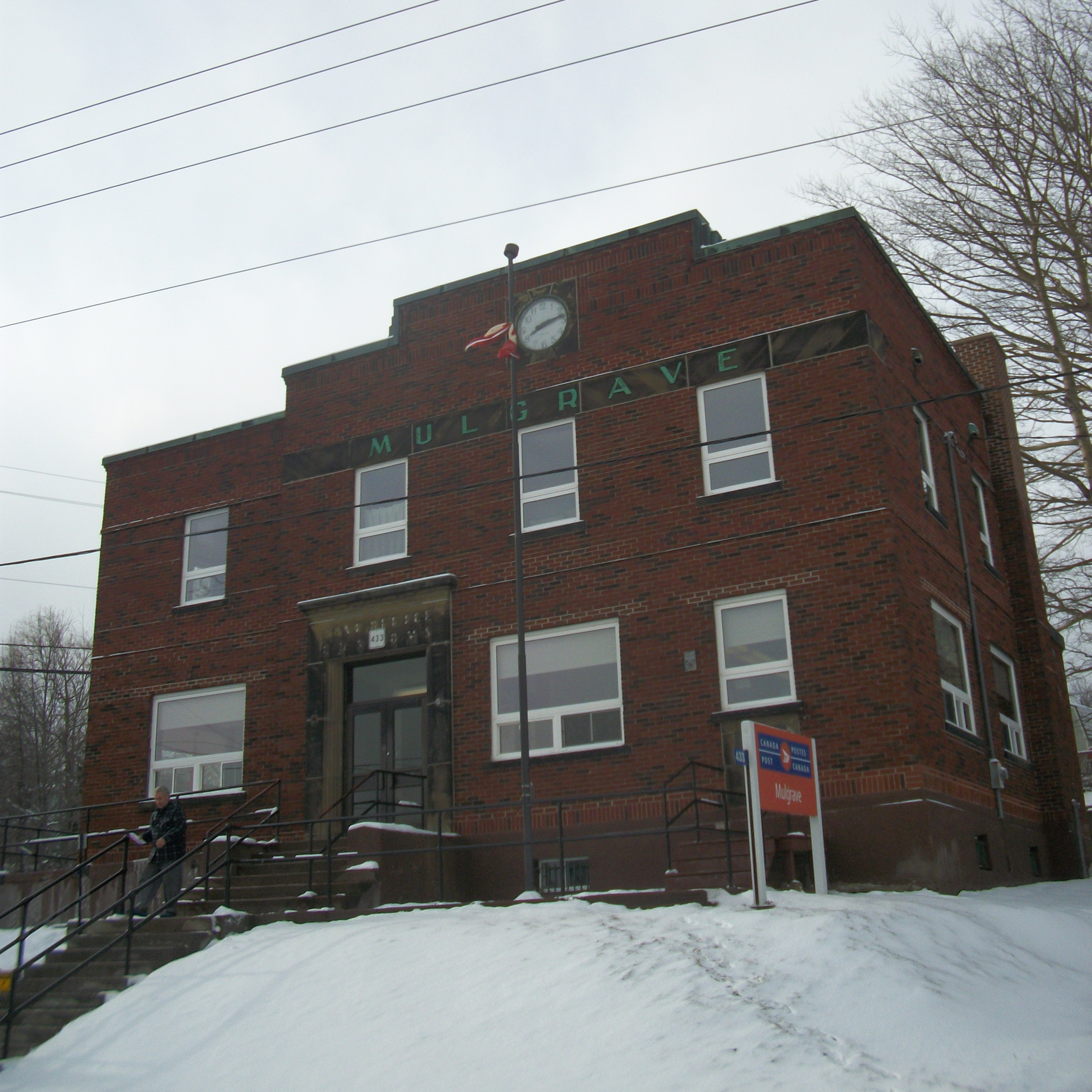
Mulgrave
