= Orex Exploration =

Former Canadian gold mining company

Orex Exploration Inc.
- Type: Public
- Traded as: TSX-V: OX
- Industry: Gold mining
- Founded: July 30, 1987
- Defunct: May 19, 2017
- Fate: Acquired by Anaconda Mining Inc.
- Headquarters: Rouyn-Noranda, Quebec, Canada
- Key people: Jacques Levesque; Mark Billings, President & CEO (200702-13)
- Products: Gold
- Total assets: CA$10.191 million(2009)
- Total equity: CA$15.489 million (2009)
- Website: www.orexexploration.ca

Orex Exploration is a former Canadian gold mining company that conducted exploration work on mining properties it owned in the Goldboro and Guysborough County areas of Nova Scotia. The properties owned by Orex were the sites of the former Boston Richardson Mine, Dolliver Mountain Mine, West Goldbrook Mine, and East Goldbrook Mine which operated between 1892 and 1912. Headquartered in Rouyn-Noranda, Quebec, the company was founded in 1987 and raised funds for exploration work, in part, by issuing stocks traded on the Montreal Stock Exchange and then the TSX Venture Exchange. It became a subsidiary of Anaconda Mining Inc. after Anaconda acquired the company in a stock swap deal in 2017.

== Property Description ==
Orex's Goldboro main property consisted of 37 contiguous claims (600 hectares) held under license from the Province of Nova Scotia. It is located along the eastern shore of Nova Scotia and is wholly owned by Orex. The property is situated 185 kilometers northeast of Halifax and is accessible by a 2.5 kilometer unpaved road from Highway 316 which links the village of Goldboro, Nova Scotia to the town of Antigonish, NS. The main project location is found at Latitude: 45° 10´ North; Longitude: 61° 40´ West (NTS 11F/04)

On November 26, 2009, following a joint venture agreement with Osisko Mining, Orex staked hundreds of additional contiguous claims which cover 960.8 square kilometers surrounding the Goldboro strike area. The current map of these claims highlighted in yellow is below. Initial exploration on these claims is now underway.

Orex Mining Claims as of February 15, 2010

== Resource Estimates ==
In September 2009, Orex published a Mineral Resource Estimate compliant with National Instrument 43-101 standards. They presented the resource estimate with a variety of cut off grades, the two most notable are represented below:

With a cut-off grade of 0.5 g/t Au, the Mineral Resource was as follows:

- 519,000 tonnes grading 3.08 g/t AU (51,400 ounces) within the Measured category
- 7,414,000 at 2.06 g/t Au (491,400 ounces) within the Indicated category; and
- 7,933,000 grading 2.13 g/t Au (542,800 ounces) within the Inferred category.

The Measured, Indicated and Inferred Resource represents a total of 15,866,000 tonnes grading 2.21 g/t Au (1,085,600 ounces).

The Results of the 2009 Mineral Resource Estimate with a cut-off grade of 1.50 g/t Au are as follows:

- 270,000 tonnes grading 4.99 g/t Au (43,300 ounces) within the Measured category
- 2,441,000 tonnes at 5.99 g/t Au (353,900 ounces) within the Indicated category; and
- 3,438,000 tonnes grading 3.67 g/t Au (405,900 ounces) within the Inferred category.

The Measured, Indicated and Inferred Resource represents a total of 2,711,000 tonnes grading 4.56 g/t Au (803,100 ounces).

A major issue with this estimate was that 96 DD samples used in previous reserve estimates were assigned a value of 0 g/t in the model due to less than complete historic sampling required for the new geological model being used. This resulted in a significantly lower than expected resource. Orex is currently resampling the areas that these holes covered as well as new areas.

== Joint venture with Osisko ==
On November 12, 2009, Orex signed an option and joint venture agreement with Osisko Mining.

The key terms of the agreement are:

- Osisko invested $1.3million in Orex and received 13,000,000 shares at a price of $0.10/share
- Osisko received 13,000,000 transferable warrants to acquire one common share at a price of $.125/share over a period of 3 years
- Osisko receives a 50% interest in the property before September 29, 2013 if it incurs exploration/development expenditures of:
  - $1,500,000 before September 29, 2010
  - $3.5 million (aggregate) on or before September 29, 2011
  - $8.0 million (aggregate) on or before September 29, 2013
- Osisko may receive a 60% interest in the property if it completes a prefeasibility study before September 29, 2015

Between November 12, 2009 and September 29, 2015 Osisko is the manager of the project, with a joint management committee during the option period with two representatives from each party. This Management Committee will be responsible for revising programs submitted by Osisko and for approving and evaluating the results of all programs. Osisko has the tie casting vote.

On November 1, 2010 Orex reported that Osisko had incurred exploration and development expenditures in excess of the $1,500,000 minimum required by September 29, 2010. (The actual amount expended was reported as $3,120,000 in Osisko's November 11, MD&A) Osisko confirmed that it would continue to incur expenditures under the option and joint venture agreement. A drilling plan and budget for the next phase of the drilling campaign on the Goldboro Gold Property was to be prepared. In Osisko's March 31, 2011 MD&A the company reported that the cumulative expenditures on the Goldboro property was $2,928,000.

On September 29, 2011, Osisko and Orex jointly announced that Osisko had allowed its option on the property to expire by not meeting the minimum expenditure requirements. Osisko stated "While the results from the 2010 and 2011 drilling campaigns are encouraging, they indicate the presence of a smaller deposit potentially minable by selective underground methods focussed on the veins, or alternatively a relatively shallow open pit operation, both of which are outside the scope of Osisko's exploration and acquisition strategy."

== Current exploration activities (2009 to 2011) ==
=== Joint venture exploration activities ===
On January 27, 2010 Orex and Osisko began their first joint exploration. A three-part campaign was planned with two drills. Osisko began with the 4,728 m / 18 holes Phase 2F drilling campaign, to some incomplete and/or non-compliant historic drill results with compliant data primarily in the deeper portions of the Ramp Area Mineral Resources and extending westward towards West Goldbrook. Following Phase 2F, Osisko continued with the Phases 2D (5,492 m / 28 holes) and 2E (2,769 m / 13 holes) drilling campaigns, which continued westward along the remaining 1.7 km segment of the Boston Richardson Deformation Zone from the Ramp through West Goldbrook to Dolliver Mountain.

As of April 29, 2010 59 holes for the Phases 2D, 2E and 2F drilling campaign, representing 12,989 metres, were completed. A 600m undrilled gap still exists between West Goldbrook and Doliver Mountain.

During the same period Nova Scotia based Mercator Geological Services Limited and D.R. Duncan & Associates Ltd., were retained and completed a regional compilation-synthesis on the 960.8 km2 Goldboro Extension Property. A number of key Goldboro-type gold targets were identified and are currently being drill-tested using the Reverse Circulation ("RC") method to recover basal till and bedrock samples for gold assaying and whole-rock analysis. To date 194 RC drill holes are completed for 1,513 meters and 758 samples taken.

On November 18, 2010 the highlights of 64 holes were released. Significant mineralization was found in 12 of them. Including four bedrock samples grading 2.3 g/t, 4.23 g/t, 10.85 g/t & 25.65 g/t.

On February 8, 2011 Orex management announced that Osisko would conduct further Diamond Drilling on 10 targets. Four holes to the west of the West Goldbrook strike area to validate the up-plunge of the West Goldbrook formation, and six east of the East Goldbrook area on a 750meter area of new prospects identified by the RC drilling. This drilling is to start in March 2011.

On April 20, 2011, Orex and Osisko announced drilling had commenced on three diamond drill holes spaced 200 m apart in the West GoldBrook to Dolliver Mountain gap where there has been no previous drilling. In addition six drill holes will be drilled on 3 sections spaced 250 m apart from East Goldbrook to the east property boundary. Reverse circulation drilling in 2010 indicated a trend of mineralization in this area. On August 11, 2011 Orex and Osisko announced the results from this drilling campaign. A total of 10 holes were drilled. Significant additional new mineralization was identified on the areas between East Goldbrook and the eastern Property Boundary including an intersection of gold that assayed at 1570 grams/ton over half of meter of core, and another sample of 410 g/t over 1/2 meter of core.

=== Independent exploration activities ===
In addition to exploration activities undertaken with Osisko, Orex is conducting field exploration activities on its many claims that are not shared with Osisko. These exploration activities are guided by the Regional Compilation study funded through the joint venture with Osisko. This information was officially revealed on November 30, 2010, although it had long been understood to be occurring by local residents and people close to the project.

On November 30, 2010, further details of the company's field exploration activities were released. New mineralization was noted to on western claims on the Goldenville and Stillwater Claims, including the discovery of a quartz vein outcrop on the Goldenville Anticline which had a sample grading 12.665 g/t, and the discovery of a 12-metre-wide quartz vein 600 m to the south of this outcrop. The company also reported a float sample grading 0.121 g/t in an area close to the Stillwater anticline with historic anomalous gold occurrences. The company also announced that it had resumed field exploration work several weeks earlier.

== Geological interpretation ==
The property is located within the Meguma Supergroup of the eastern Canada Appalachian Belt. The property is entirely underlain by sedimentary rocks of the Goldenville Group, which consist of altered greywacke, sandstone (arenite), and slate. The stratigraphic sedimentary succession of the Goldboro area is affected by the Upper Seal Harbour anticline. This anticline is an upright, ENE-trending tight fold with a 10° to 30° plunge to the east. In the apex of the anticline, the slate units are thicker than other sedimentary rock types. The following diagram illustrates the Goldenville & Upper Seal Harbor Anticlines and the relative location of gold mineralization being explored by Orex and Osisko:

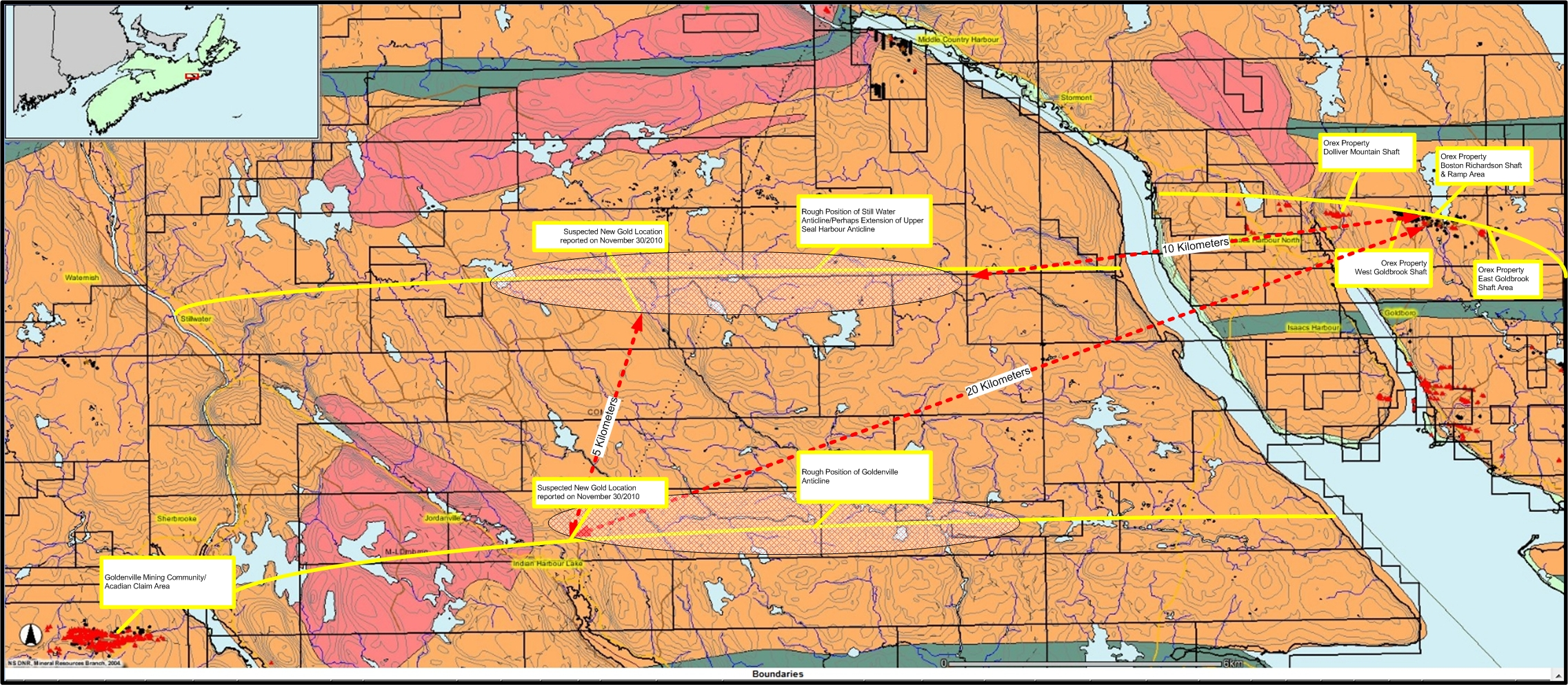
Goldenville and Upper Seal Harbour Anticlines Annotated with Orex Gold Locations

The Goldboro mineralization has been previously referred to as a “saddle reef” lode-gold deposit type. In Nova Scotia, the Boston-Richardson mine (Upper Seal Harbour district) is a classic example of a “saddle reef” deposit. The gold mineralization at Goldboro occurs in association with and within a quartz vein swarm located in the hinges of regional anticlines, principally in black shale-argillite wall rocks. As such, Goldboro is not a classic “saddle reef” lode gold deposit type. The fine-grained folded sedimentary units have a constant thickness in the limb but not in the hinge of the fold, suggesting flexural-slip as the folding mechanism. Many key features within the gold deposits of the Upper Seal Harbour district show that the folding itself should be considered as the gold mineralizing process.

Gold mineralization at Goldboro occurs in quartz veins and disseminated sulphides in the wall rock. The mineralized wall rock mostly, but not exclusively, consists of shale-argillite (slate). Locally, the greywacke and arenite are cut by quartz veins and are mineralized. The veins are characterized by quartz, sulphide (auriferous arsenopyrite) and native gold (visible gold flakes have historically been observed in several slate belts). Wall rocks generally contain more sulphides than the veins, in the form of arsenopyrite selvedges.

Exploration by Orex from 2005-2008 indicated that in certain portions of the sedimentary sequence the intervening sandstone rocks contained sufficient veining and mineralization that in combination with the shale/slate units formed large zones of lower grades that could possibly be mined by open pit methods.

The 2010 drilling is revealing further possible revisions to the interpretation as they see a strong subvertical influence in the location of mineralization probably along subvertical shear zone(s).

The shorter term focus has been the identification and delineation of the maximum number of low cost near surface potentially open pit resources. This would be followed by investigation of higher grade shallow and deeper resources for potential economically viable underground operations either independent or complementary to potential open pitting.

=== Faribault ===
In 1885, E.R. Faribault mapped Nova Scotia's gold fields for the Geological Survey Department (Government of Canada). He focused on the intricate folds in the gold-bearing formations along the southeast coast of Nova Scotia known as the Meguma Group. He recognized that the gold occurred like saddles along the crests of small anticlines and he discovered many large and small ore bodies. His discoveries were critical to the present knowledge of the location of gold in Nova Scotia.

In 1893, Map #27 by the Geological Survey Department was produced by E.R. Faribault to illustrate a report commissioned by the Department from Hugh Fletcher and E.R. Faribault in 1886. This map (below) illustrates the extensive known gold fields in the areas around Goldboro. Many of these properties are currently claimed by Orex Exploration, while some others are held by other mineral claim holders. In addition detailed cross sections of the Isaac's Harbour gold district and also of the Boston Richardson mine were produced by Faribault (below).

| Province of Nova Scotia, Guysborough County, Isaacs Harbour, Sheet No 27 | Plan and Sections, Isaacs Harbour Gold District, Guysborough County, Nova Scotia | Plan and Sections, Upper Seal Harbour, Guysborough County, Nova Scotia |

=== Nugget effect ===
A major hurdle for Orex has been to evaluate the gold content of the mineralized belts. The gold distribution is subject to a severe “nugget effect” with a strong segregation component. In the case of Goldboro, gold appears as large nuggets, fine disseminations within or bordering arsenopyrite crystals and fine gold grains associated with carbonaceous material. This particular distribution of gold grains may explain the fact that regular assaying methods (A.A.; F.A; metallics) yield lower gold values than a metallurgical balance from mill-tests.

Historically, the severe “nugget effect” produced by the extreme variability in gold size and distribution within the Goldboro mineralized belts forced companies to implement a number of sampling and grade determination programs. The nugget effect is so extreme that collecting and processing samples of a size adequate enough to overcome the nugget effect is problematic using conventional analytical methods. The programs have resulted in a wide variety of sample types tested by several different processing protocols on the initial and sub-split sample sizes. Sample types have included:

- surface and underground grab samples,
- surface and underground drill core samples,
- drill sludge samples,
- drill core composite samples,
- underground chip samples,
- underground muck samples, and
- underground bulk samples.

The results from these tests clearly demonstrated that undersized initial samples and/or improper sub-split sizes for the crush and/or grind sizes could produce imprecise determinations of grade.

=== Bendigo Ballarat ===
Many comparisons have been made between the gold deposits of the Goldfields area of Central Victoria (Australia) and the Meguma deposits of Nova Scotia (Canada). The comparisons show that these deposits share numerous similarities but also display some differences.

The comparisons between deposits in the Goldfields area of Australia and Meguma deposits in Nova Scotia could have a significant impact for gold exploration at Goldboro and elsewhere in Nova Scotia. The Australian examples demonstrate that narrow quartz vein gold deposits, similar to those in Nova Scotia, can be mined profitably. Furthermore, it also demonstrates that low-grade concentrations of gold (1-2 g/t Au) can be mined as economically viable deposits. At Bendigo, 22 Million ounces of gold have been produced since 1851, and about 12 Million ounces of gold have been produced at Ballarat since 1850. Exploration programs in Australia demonstrate that the grade of mineralized veins cannot be assessed without bulk sampling, and where applicable, declines must be an integral part of the exploration strategy.

This comparison indicates that a potential for a larger deposits exists on Orex's property.

=== High grade/low grade ===
Two different approaches to geological modeling can be used for resource estimation at Goldboro: the mineralized zones can be interpreted as either: (i) narrower and higher grade folded belts (about sixteen (16) belts); or (ii) they can be grouped into larger structural domains (about four (4) domains). For the 2009 Mineral Resource Estimate, the first approach (e.g., individual belts rather than domains) was used. In both approaches, the higher grade material is in similar locations—fold hinges where maximum dilation seems to have occurred—although differences can occur in the distribution of lower grade material. Some tests have been completed using the two different approaches, and both models gave similar totals for contained ounces.

== History ==
A very detailed history of the mines and the works found on the property prior to 1915 can be found in Naert, Karl A. (March 1988) [1988], Review of the Exploration Program Performed by Onitap Resources Inc. in the Goldboro Area .... Development License No. 0114, March, 1988 (PDF), Scarborough: Narex Ore Search Consultants Inc., pp. 24–35 a summary is presented below.

=== Boston Richardson Mine ===
In 1861 gold was discovered in quartz veins on the Isaac's Harbour anticline. In 1892, Howard Richardson was the first to note gold within shale and quartz veins which became generally known as the Boston Richardson Belt. Mining on the property began in 1892 when the Richardson Gold Mining Company started developing the belt.

In 1896 the mine was operating at full capacity and by 1897 three shafts gave access to the ore at a depth of 60m. By 1900 the main shaft was 160 metres (520 ft) deep and selective mining methods were being used and two Wilfley Concentrators were in operation. Two additional concentrators were installed in 1901. In 1902 another shaft was sunk which became known as the Boston Richardson Shaft, and which is still in existence to the present day.

The Boston Richardson Mining Company took over the property in 1903 and resumed work on the Boston Richardson shaft which they extended to a depth of 122m which by 1905. A bromo-cyanide plant was built on the property in 1906 and gold recovery went up to 70%. The main shaft had reached a depth of 213m by 1902. Operations were stopped on August 15, 1908 because of financial difficulties. In 1909 the New England Mining Company took over operations until 1912.

In 1926 the Metals Mining and Smelting Corporation of Canada acquired the property and attempted to recover gold from the old mine tailings.

| Goldboro, NS. A train is seen coaling on the wharf near a waiting schooner. | Richardson Gold Mine, NS | Surface plant of the Boston Richardson Mining Co., Upper Seal Harbour | Horizontal Projection of Survey Down East Shaft Made After Cave In of the Richardson Mine |
| Boston-Richardson Mine-Vertical Shaft and Vertical Projection of Incline Shaft Showing Depth Reached and Distance Driven South Side | Cross-Sections of the Boston-Richardson Mine | Cross-Sections of the North and South Side of the Boston-Richardson Mine | Plan Projections and Transverse Section of Underground Workings of Boston-Richardson Mine |
New England Mining Company Stock Certificate

=== Dolliver Mountain Mine ===
An underground mine was active on Dolliver Mountain between 1901 and 1905. Dolliver mountain is located to the west of the Boston Richardson Shaft. In 1902 the shaft had a depth of 58m and intersected three ore belts one of which (the "Partington Belt") was 10m in width. In 1903 the shaft reached a depth of 81m and intersected the "Forge Belt" which was 7m in width. By 1904 the shaft was 149m deep and in 1905 a 152m drill hole was drilled from the bottom of the shaft which intersected several more bodies of quartz and slate. The mine has remained idle since 1905.

| View of stamp mill and portion of ore tramway. | Surface plant of Dolliver Mountain Gold Mining Co., Upper Seal Harbour | Dolliver Mountain Mine, Upper Isaacs Harbour Gold District, Guysborough, Nova Scotia County |

=== West Goldbrook Mine ===
The West Gold Brook mine is located west of the Boston Richardson Shaft. Between 1909 and 1910 five ore belts were discovered in the West Gold Brook Mine. Milling tests on the ore from three of the belts was not satisfactory and the mine was abandoned. Locarno Copper Mines Ltd. Sank a new shaft west of the original one between 1929 and 1931. In 1931 a metallurgical test recovered 1.61 ounces of gold from 1.1 Short tons of ore. In 1956 The Canso Mining Corporation dewatered the Locarno shaft and did some basic exploration but work was stopped due to financial difficulty.

=== East Goldbrook Mine ===
In 1907 a shaft was sunk \to the east of the Boston Richardson shaft. In 1908 three ore belts were discovered and some rich ore was discovered in one, but no further work is noted. The East Goldbrook shaft was dewatered between 1931 and 1934 by Renada Mines Ltd. who sampled the workings and assaying gave results between 1.61 and 4.26 g/t Au.

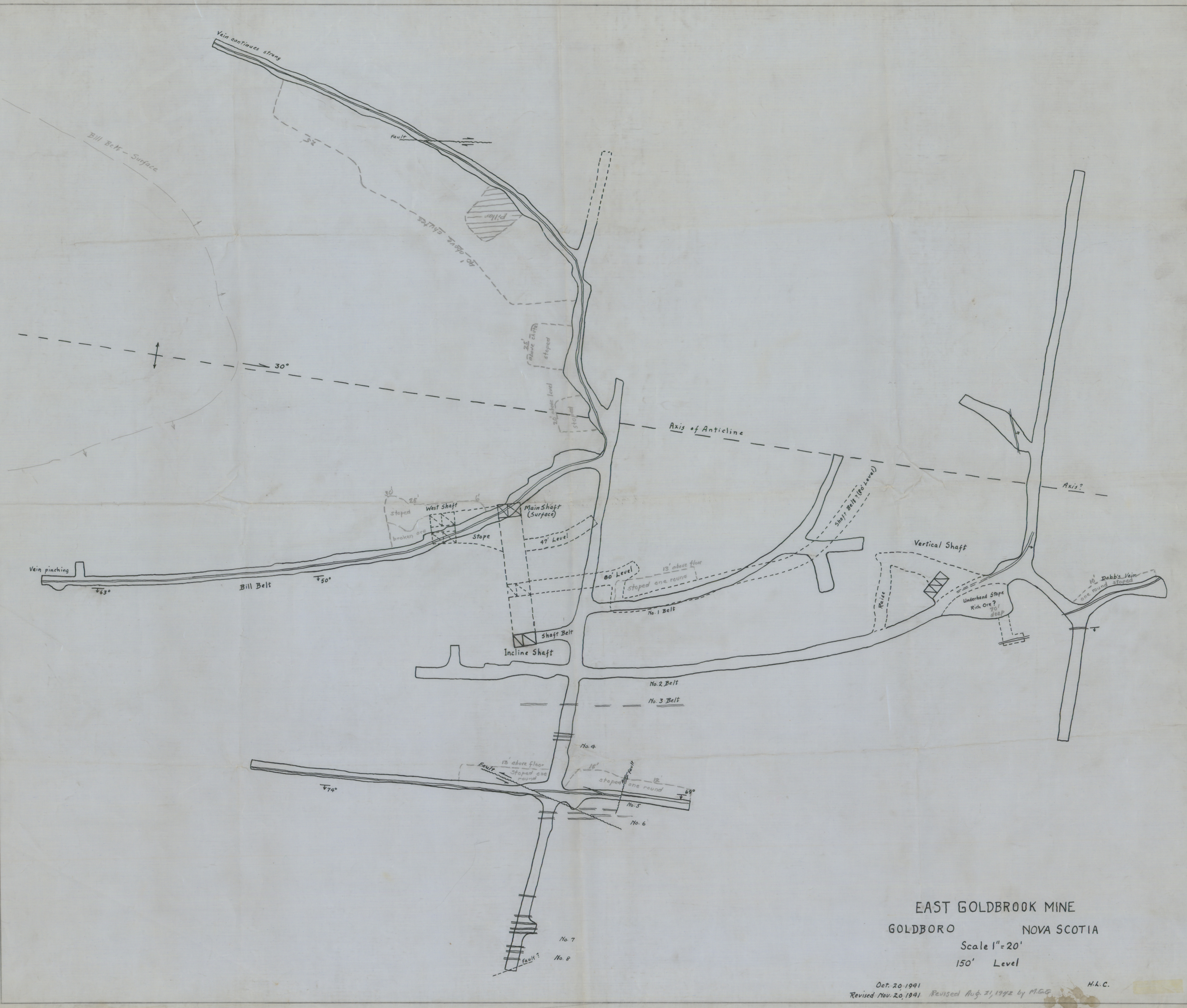
East Goldbrook Mine Plan 150' Level

== Modern exploration ==
=== 1980 to 1989 ===
Very little additional work is documented about the property until 1981 when exploration by a series of junior exploration companies resumed.

In 1981 Pantino Mines Ltd. did some geophysical surveys and in 1984 a 529m diamond drill hole was drilled on the Boston Richardson Belt. In 1985 five diamond drill holes will drilled on the former West Gold Brook mine. Each hole intercepted many slate beds but few samples were taken.

In 1987 Petromet Resources Ltd. and Greenstrike Gold corporation drilled an additional 5 diamond drill holes and late in the year Omnitap Resources Inc. completed and additional 33 diamond drill holes. Helicopter borne magnetic and EM-16 surveys were also conducted. The goal of this campaign was to establish the depth and breadth of the Boston Richardson Belt. It was also targeted at the East Goldbrook property and on targets under the Boston Richardson Belt. It led to the detection of four additional belts under the Boston Richardson Belt and additional belts over the Boston Richardson Belt in the East Goldbrook area. These belts showed impressive gold values and visible gold was found in almost every hole.

The option on the property was conveyed to Orex Exploration in 1988.

In 1988 a surface and underground exploration program was undertaken to cover the property to the west of the Boston Richardson Mine. Course gold was found in quartz veins and free gold was found in graphite black shale and fourteen belts of gold bearing ore had been identified. During 1988 the Boston Richardson Mine shaft was rehabilitated to facilitate an underground exploration program. Orex Exploration sought ACOA funding to develop a new modern mine. and sought Tenders for conducting a Pre-Feasibility and Feasibility Study. In addition an access decline (often called "The Ramp" and "Ramp Area") was developed to validate the drilling results and muck sampling was undertaken.

At the beginning of 1989 the company conducted a metallurgical test on muck samples from 1988 and found that the results were much higher than those determined using atomic absorption sampling on core samples from the same areas. (3.3g/t for cyanidation version 2.0g/t for atomic absorption). A milling test on several new diamond drill holes was conducted.

In 1989 the company also completed a Pre-Feasibility and two feasibility Studies.

The Pre-Feasibility study recommended underground mining, a standard gravity/flotation mill and concluded that a profit of $40 per ton would be realized.

The first feasibility study expanded on the pre-feasibility study and described three possible options, two of which involved variations on a portable 500 metric ton/day mill and underground mining, and the third option involved open pit mining, selective underground mining and a 5,000 metric ton/day mill. All scenarios were considered economically viable but the third option of an open pit mine and large mill was considered to have the largest possible return to shareholders and was the recommended option.

The second feasibility study was produced two months after the first and recommended only a modified sub-level retreat mining methodology with no mention of the open pit mining option described in the first feasibility study. It concluded that this was economical within the capital available to the company.

The company then notified the Department of the Environment for the Province of Nova Scotia of its intent to proceed with a Gold Mining Project. The company proposed to undertake open pit mining and recover the gold using a gravitational mill with flotation process and cyanide processing. A public meeting was held as part of this process on March 27, 1989 with the major concerns being the environmental control requirements from the government, possible stream contamination and site reclamation.

The company also produced an Economic Evaluation of the project in 1989 which estimated an average 195 direct jobs and 293 indirect jobs would be created per year in the first 4 years and 240 direct jobs in subsequent years. The evaluation stated that direct economic benefits of $13 million could be expected in the first four years in the Guysborough County area. In addition, it forecast expenditures of $70 million in initial capital investment for equipment and machinery and subsequent expenditures of $12.8 million per year - much of which was to be sourced in the Guysborough and Antigonish Counties. The total value of the project to the community was forecast to be $123.25 million in the first four years of operation.

Between 1989 and 1990 additional underground definition drilling was undertaken and two underground bulk samples of 7 metric tons were mined out.

=== 1990 to 2004 ===
Between 1990 and 1993 very little exploration work occurred on the property while a scientific debate raged about the correct way to accurate measure the gold deposit's grade and numerous technical reports and assessments were completed.

In 1990 the terms of reference for an environmental assessment were produced and the environment assessment was conducted. The assessment concluded "No significant negative impacts are anticipated."

The main controversy was whether the deposit was a high grade deposit (due to the presence of large numbers of gold nuggets) or low grade deposit (due to the fine gold found in the slate belts). Conventional fire assays were yielding significantly lower grade results than metallurgical tests which were consistently returning high grade results. Continuous Grind Leach techniques were evaluated under option with Minnova Inc., but did not yield satisfactory results. In 1992 a Vat Leach test was conducted with Novagold (under option) which yielded grades of 4-6g/t Au with an 84% recovery rate. NovaGold was forced to drop its option due to financial difficulties.

In 1993 Orex drilled six more diamond drill holes to evaluate the extent of the high grade resource. The results were analyzed by CRM labs and were just as problematic, returning the same results as found by Minnova, but with large amounts of gold being found unrecovered by the sampling protocol. This was due to the high nugget effect and the failure of the large gold nuggets to dissolve in the cyanide concentrations.

Placer Dome contacted Orex in 1995 and offered to assist as they had encountered similar sampling problems in the past. Placer sampled the stock pile of ore recovered in 1988-89 in a very methodical way. They took samples of four types of rock: Greywacke, Slate, Quartz Vein and Vein. They discarded any samples with visible gold. The results were extremely encouraging showing 1g/t in Greywacke, 2.82g/t in Slate, 16.15 g/t in Quartz Vein and 36.37 g/t in veins.

In 1995 Placer Dome offered $30 million to acquire a 65% interest in the Goldboro property. Placer Dome proceeded to obtain environmental releases from the Province of Nova Scotia for past mining environmental problems (related to the turn of the century activities) delays in obtaining this release meant exploration did not start again until late in 1995. Due to budget cutbacks, conventional sampling was reinstated with a return to the previous "low grade" results. In 1996 Placer dome dropped its option in order to focus on international properties and other ventures.

The site was essentially abandoned between 1996 and 2004. The shaft house and mechanical buildings were significantly vandalized, and all of the core samples were largely lost.

=== 2004 to 2009 ===
In February 2004, MRB & Associates was retained by Orex to prepare an independent technical report on the Goldboro property. The report was a joint effort between a team of independent consultants (InnovExplo Inc., A.S. Horvath Consulting, Tech2Mine Inc., and MRB & Associates), supervised by Jean Lafleur, M.Sc. (Senior Technical Advisor to Orex).

One of the reasons for this independent study was to review the geology of the Goldboro property and Meguma district in Nova Scotia, and compare the characteristics of Meguma-style deposits to those of the Bendigo and Ballarat deposits in the Lachlan fold belt of Central Victoria, Australia. Another purpose was to review historical sampling and analytical grade determination procedures at Goldboro and provide an assessment of the data quality and suitability of these historical results as they pertain to:

- mineralization characteristics and recommendations for future sampling, grade determination, and QA/QC protocols;
- data quality and integrity for use in resource/reserve estimation, and;
- comparison of the sampling, analytical determination and reserve estimation methods with those used at deposits in the Bendigo-Ballarat district.

The conclusions and recommendations stemming from the study set the stage for the 2005 exploration program undertaken by Orex, specifically the conclusions regarding grade determinations. Horvath made the following conclusions (among others):

- Historical conventional sampling, processing and analytical gold determination protocols consistently underestimated the grade due to the extreme nugget effect;
- The only reliable method of obtaining accurate and precise grade determinations for Goldboro mineralized samples is by metallurgical testing/processing of adequately sized representative samples.

Orex began an exploration program in February 2005. Twenty-three (23) diamond drill holes of HQ diameter core were completed for a total of 2,355 metres (BR05-001 to BR05-023). Drilling was concentrated in a 225-metre wide area, centred on Section 8675E of the Boston Richardson belt. The individual sample weight was estimated to be 7.75 kg per metre of recovered core.

The purpose of the drill program was to test a small area of known shallow mineralized zones by drilling fences of holes on a spacing of no greater than 25 metres between sections. The proposed pattern of drilling and number of holes was designed to allow two (2) separate shallow areas to be similarly tested. Four (4) holes were twinned to previous holes for comparative analysis. Recognized mineralized zones were assayed using conventional fire assay with an atomic absorption or gravimetric finish, and at the end of the program, sample composites (made by combining reject samples from multiple drill holes previously analyzed by conventional fire assay) were made and sent to Lakefield Research for metallurgical testing. A resource estimate in compliance with CIM Definitions and Standards on Mineral Resources and Mineral Reserves was undertaken at the end of the program by P & E Mining Consultants Inc. using the metallurgical sample results (Armstrong, Puritch and Horvath, 2006).

Orex began an exploration program in February 2008 that consisted of a diamond drill program comprising 12,201.5 metres in forty-five (45) holes. The average drill hole length was 250 metres. Drilling was concentrated between West Goldbrook and East Goldbrook on Crown Land surface rights. The purpose of the drill program was to infill the previous drill programs and test the extensions of gold mineralization to the east and west of the Boston-Richardson zone.

In September 2009, Orex commissioned a Mineral Resource Estimate which was compliant with National Instrument 43-101.

== Past resource estimates ==
=== 2006 resource estimate ===
In 2006 P&E Mining consultants was commissioned to produce a new NI43-101 compliant Resource estimate based on the results from the new 2005 drilling campaign.

There was no new resource calculation for the entire strike length—only an update to the 225-m portion within the Ramp Area (which was newly drilled with large bore samples) was calculated. The reconciled resources outside the 225-m strike length of the Ramp Area for the remainder of the 1.5-km strike length was 800,800 ounces tabulated as follows:

| Area | Classification | Tonnes | Grade (g/t) | Oz AU |
| Ramp | Measured | 481,000 | 3.40 | 52,600 |
| Outside Ramp | Measured | 274,00 | 1.21 | 10,700 |
| Ramp | Indicated | 755,000 | 2.61 | 183,400 |
| Outside Ramp | Indicated | 12,500,000 | 0.75 | 238,100 |
| Outside Ramp | Inferred | 15,600,000 | 0.63 | 316,000 |

=== 2004 resource estimate ===
In 2004 Orex commissioned MRB & Associates to produce an NI43-101 compliant resource estimate based on past exploration activities and available data. The Technical report concluded that the resource defined at that point was 644,000 oz as summarized in the table below. This estimate did not apply any correction factors for the extreme nugget effect.

| Area | Category | Metric Tonnes | g/t Au | Oz AU |
| Boston Richardson Area | Measured | 755,000 | 1.21 | 29,300 |
| | Indicated | 12,500,000 | 0.75 | 301,000 |
| | Inferred | 13,255,000 | 0.78 | 175,500 |
| West Goldbrook Area | Inferred | 8,600,000 | 0.50 | 138,200 |

=== 1990 ore reserve calculation ===
In 1990 an Ore Reserve Calculation was commissioned. It determined between 1.4 and 2.4 million ounces of gold would be found on areas surrounding the former Boston Richardson shafts and the West Goldbrook mine:

- Ramp Area: 755,002 tonnes @ 1.19 to 2.42 g/t
- Main Ore Body: 19,500,000 tonnes @ 0.75 to 3.37 g/t
- West Goldbrook Area: 8,614,817 tonnes @ 0.53 to 0.84 g/t

This estimate explicitly excluded the East Goldbrook areas from these calculations and suggested that these areas could contain 10 million tons of ore with a grade of 2.8g/ton.

=== 1989 ore reserve calculation ===
An Ore Reserve calculation was produced by St-Michel Geoconseil in 1989 specific to the access portal ramp area. It concluded there was 1,068,547 metric tons of ore grading 6.2g/ton (un-cut) of gold for approximately 205,000 oz of gold in the area of the ramp.

=== 1988 ore reserve calculation ===
In 1988 a non NI43-101 compliant Ore Reserve Calculation was compiled by Narex Ore Search Consultants and concluded there was 1,102,036 tons @ 0.194oz/ton indicated ore, for a total indication of 213,694oz of gold.

=== Pre-1981 ===
Reliable production figures are only available for the Boston Richardson belt. From 1893 to 1912 mine production was recorded as 414 887 short tons grading 0.132 Oz/T (376 383 tonnes grading 4.53 g/t Au) for a total production of 54 871 ounces of gold. The head grade was estimated to be considerably higher at 6.8 g/t Au but poor technology at the time resulted in the lower recovered grade. Anecdotal reports from the descendants of former miners indicate that a certain amount of loss due to theft occurred. This is possible due to the nugget nature of the gold found in the belts. It has been said that a lot more gold was taken out of the belts than was officially reported. Some claim that some mining families never worked for many decades following the closure of the mines yet always had money to spend.
