= Wine Harbour, Nova Scotia =

Community in Nova Scotia, Canada

Coordinates: 45°4′33.79″N 61°50′19.29″W

Wine Harbour in Nova Scotia

Wine Harbour is a community in the Canadian province of Nova Scotia, located in Guysborough County.

== Climate ==
The presence of the Atlantic Ocean gives the area a semi-maritime climate with a delay of seasons as compared with inland areas; however, frequent offshore winds bring continental-type weather with winter cold and summer heat. In late summer and fall, the area can be threatened by hurricanes or their extratropical remnants.

== Geology, soils and vegetation ==
The bedrock is quartzite of the Goldenville Group. This quartzite is dominated by silicon dioxide and has little more than trace amounts of nutrient-bearing minerals; consequently, the soils are infertile. They are also so stony as to be non-arable. The dominant soil, a Gleyed Podzol, is mapped as the Danesville Series over most parts of the community; the higher, better-drained western side has Orthic Podzol development and is mapped as Halifax Series. Somewhat stunted but well-exploited forests of black spruce, white spruce, tamarack and balsam fir alternate with treeless barrens and peat bogs. Pitcher plants and sundews are abundant in the bogs.

== History ==
Wine Harbour was named when a Portuguese vessel loaded with wine was wrecked here, and its cargo flowed into the harbour, establishing the name. The Mi'kmaw name was "Pebumkeegunech" which when translated to English means "fish spawning place" or "an outlet cut through the sand". In 1818, one family consisting of five persons settled here and cleared 10 acres (40,000 m^{2}). This was probably the family of John Walters, a native of North Carolina and a veteran of the American Revolutionary War who settled in Nova Scotia around 1811 or 1812.

=== Gold mining ===
Gold was first discovered in July 1860 by Joseph Smith, who found specks of gold around Barachois Cove, which is a small cove located within the district. Prospectors soon expanded discoveries to quartz veins on the northeastern shore, triggering a local gold rush. By 1862, Wine Harbour was thriving rapidly, mostly because of the discovery of gold which was the beginning of a great gold boom which lasted until 1905. The first crusher used was called the Victoria Crusher and it was run by water power. The procedure began when the rocks were hoisted out of the ground by horses, put on wooden scowls and brought across the harbour, if the wind was favorable, to the Victoria Crusher which was on the then Thomas Cooper property. The surveyor for the mining company at this time was D. W. Crockett. At the peak of this gold boom there were ten crushers run by steam power using coal, which was brought from vessels from Sydney. Between 1862 and 1907 approximately 42,336.5 troy oz of gold (grading an average of 11.73 g/t) were extracted. Because of the gold mine, Wine Harbour was one of the first settlements in Guysborough County to have electricity.

After 1905, the gold mining industry lay desolate, until 1936 when C. Irving supervised the opening of the once prosperous gold mines, but it died the following year. Limited farming, fishing and logging were the main industries after the gold mining ended.

By 1956, the population decreased to 50. Around 1975, the population of the community declined to 25, and in 2014 the population stands at 9..
