= Canadian Malartic Corporation =

Canadian mining company

- Type: Public (to 2014); Subsidiary (since 2014)
- Industry: Mining
- Predecessor: Osisko Mining Corporation
- Headquarters: Malartic, Quebec, Canada
- Products: Gold, Silver
- Parent: Yamana Gold; Agnico Eagle Mines Limited
- Website: canadianmalartic.com/en/

The Canadian Malartic Corporation (formerly Osisko Mining Corporation) is a mining company that operates the Malartic mine near Malartic, Quebec. Prior to 2014 the company was a public company named Osisko Mining Corporation with shares listed on the Toronto Stock Exchange and New York Stock Exchange. In 2014, Osisko Mining was subject to a hostile takeover bid by Goldcorp but an alternative bid by white knights Yamana Gold and Agnico Eagle Mines Limited was accepted that, in addition to offering a higher price, created the spin-off Osisko Gold Royalties and turned Osisko Mining Corporation into the subsidiary company Canadian Malartic Corporation jointly owned by Yamana Gold and Agnico Eagle. From its founding in 1982 until 2006, Osisko Mining bought and sold mineral exploration rights in Quebec, conducting exploration work. The company acquired an interest in the Canadian Malartic property in 2004 and after promising feasibility studies the mine was constructed with commercial production achieved in May 2011.

== Malartic mine ==
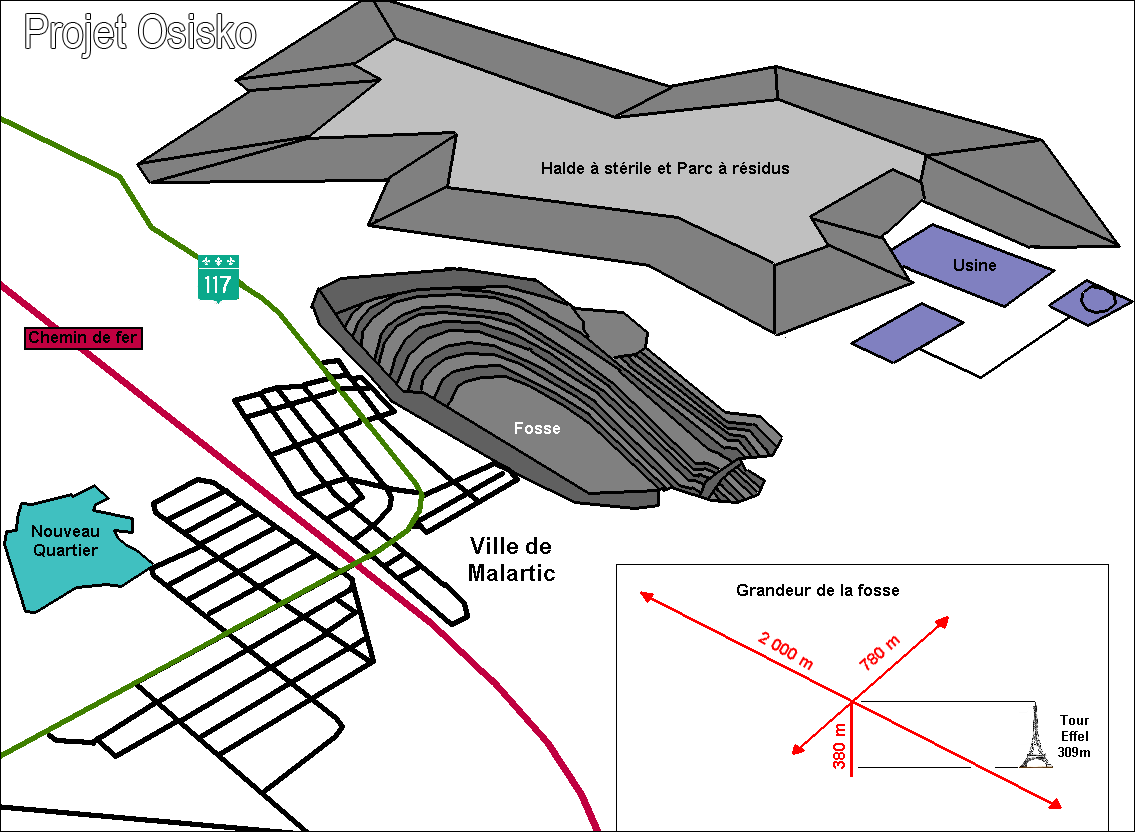
plan of the malartic mine

The Canadian Malartic mine is located in Malartic, Quebec, a community about 550 km northwest of Montreal in the administrative region of Abitibi-Témiscamingue. The gold deposit, which extends a couple kilometers along the Cadillac fault and includes porphyry gold has a resource of up to 348 tonnes. Only areas considered to have more than 3g/ton of gold will be mined. Expansion projects near Malartic were considered after favourable drilling results in Southern Barnat. 204 of the 205 homeowners in the area representing about 1/7 of the town's population, were bought out but the 1 remaining tried to use his interest in the area to keep the company from going ahead despite support for it from the mayor who estimates that it will create 880 direct and indirect jobs. In August 2010 a superior court judge awarded the property to Osisko Mining Corporation after determining it was an obstacle for important preparation work at the project. Production at the mine was scheduled to begin in June 2011. The Malartic mine reached commercial production in May/June 2011 after processing averaged 33,300 tonnes (32,800 long tons) per day in the four weeks ended June 17, 2011.

In March 2008, Osisko created Le Fonds Essor Malartic Osisko, a 3 million dollar fund to be used in support of Malartic economic development projects, public facilities and infrastructure. Also, a project follow-up committee was established to oversee the operation and bring up any concerns the community might have such as those regarding the environment. Its members were chosen with the intent that the committee be completely independent of the company to avoid conflicts of interest.

Gold mining in Malartic produced about 5 million troy ounces (340,000 lb; 160,000 kg) between 1935 and 1983. The last major mining in the area was done by Barrick Gold in 2002.

=== Production ===
In 2012 gold production totaled 388,478 ozt (12,083.0 kg), up 188,341 ozt (5,858.1 kg) from the year before. During the three months from June 30 to September 30, 2011, the company produced 73,814 troy ounces (2,295.9 kg) of gold up from 27,100 ozt (840 kg) the previous quarter, and 40,715 ozt (1,266.4 kg) of silver (up from 16,432 the quarter prior). Gold was produced at a cash cost of US$939/oz (quarter). In terms of sales, 72,100 ozt (2,240 kg) of gold and 49,100 ozt (1,530 kg) of silver were sold during the quarter. Operating costs account for 79% of total costs. For the first time since 2008, the company had positive earnings ($9.3m)

In January 2017 Osisko reported it earned record gold equivalent ounces totaling 38,270 from its royalties and streams, along with record revenue from gold sales of CA$62.7 million, in 2016. As of December 31, 2016 the company had cash and cash equivalents totaling $499.2 million.

== Corporate history ==
The company was incorporated on February 18, 1982, as Ormico Exploration Ltée but changed names to Osisko Exploration Ltée with its headquarters in Montreal. Its name derived from Osisko Lake, located within Quebec's portion of the Abitibi gold belt in the region of Rouyn-Noranda is where, in 1920, Noranda founder Edmond Henry Horne made his first major mineral discovery, a deposit that became known as the Horne Mine.

Osisko Mining Corporation logo

Its shares were publicly listed on the Montreal Stock Exchange and then the TSX Venture Exchange. It did business as a mineral exploration company with a focus on Quebec properties. It acquired rights to the properties, conducted exploration work and assessed mineral development potential. In November 2004 they acquired the Canadian Malartic property, a former mine that Lac Minerals had operated. Barrick Gold, who had acquired Lac Minerals, sold the property to McWatters Mining and Osisko acquired it from creditors after McWatters Mining went bankrupt. As favourable exploration, feasibility and economic assessment results came in, re-development of the Malartic mine became the focus of the company. The Canadian Malartic mine was expected to be the biggest gold mine ever in Quebec and one of the biggest gold mines in Canada.

In 2009, the company's management received the Northern Miner's Mining Persons of the Year award and in December 2009, the Company and Robert Wares, Osisko's COO, together donated 4.1 million dollars' worth of shares in the company to the Department of Earth and Planetary Sciences at McGill University.

On July 3, 2009, Osisko purchased 49.1% of Bowmore Exploration Ltd. a month before Goldcorp acquired a 3.2% interest in Osisko (at the time Goldcorp owned 12.9% of company shares); On February 9, 2011, Goldcorp sold its 10.1% equity interest in Osisko for $530 million. Later that year in December, in a joint venture with Clifton Star Resources Osisko acquired Quebec's Duparquet mining project, an area that produced 1 million troy ounces (69,000 lb; 31,000 kg) of gold between 1931 and 1957, when it was operated by Beattie Gold Mine. So far the company has infused $66.83 million into the venture. On June 17, 2011, it withdrew from Duparquet.

In March 2010 Osisko filed a takeover offer for Brett Resources that proved to be success on May 19, 2010 (initially 77% of the company was purchased, on August 13 it purchased the other 23%). The deal, valued at more than $372 million, enabled Osisko to acquire the Hammond Reef Gold Project in Atikokan near Thunder Bay, Ontario and its 6.70 million troy ounces (208,000 kg) of gold. If all regulatory approvals are met, the mine was expected to open in 2015 when it would be capable of producing 463,000 troy ounces (14,400 kg) of gold annually.

By March 2011 It owns at least 17.41 million troy ounces (1,194,000 lb; 542,000 kg) of gold reserves (including 10.71 in malartic and 6.7 at Hammond Reef, malartic reserves up 20% due to higher gold prices) and over 230 square kilometres (89 sq mi) of land in the Malartic-Cadillac area.

In December 2012 Osisko Mining completed the $550 million takeover of Ontario mining company Queenston Mining. Just three months earlier Queenston announced a 112% increase in gold resource. Queenston's main property is the Upper Beaver project located near Kirkland Lake, Ontario. The Upper Beaver mine will have a mine life of ten years and is projected to start operating in 2016.

In April 2014, it was revealed in the media that Yamana Gold and Agnico Eagle Mines Limited could acquire Osisko's flagship Canadian Malartic mine for around $3.5 billion.

== Exploration projects ==
Among the exploration projects that Osisko were involved in from 2009 to 2014 included the Dunn, Mount Joy, and Goldboro properties. The Dunn property is located 35 kilometres (22 mi) NE of Rouyn-Noranda, Quebec; it involves 1,990 hectares (4,900 acres) of land in Clericy and La Pause and ownership is shared with Midland Exploration, a tsx venture exchange listed exploration company focused on mining opportunities in Quebec. The stake in the Mount Joy property in Timmins, Ontario is minor however, it has the option of becoming majority owner (up to 70%) by incurring project expenditures of 4-5 million dollars total in installments made on specific dates, by delivering a bankable feasibility study, and by securing additional financing. The project, which covers 1,500 hectares (3,700 acres) of land, is controlled by Claim Post Resources, a company that in which Osisko owns stock. Over the last century, 68 thousand troy ounces (2,100 kg) of gold have been mined in Timmins, Ontario. The Goldboro property is located in Goldboro, Nova Scotia in the region of Guysborough County. Because of an agreement made in November 2009 with Orex Exploration, which currently controls the project, Osisko can obtain a 50% stake by incurring project expenditures. Gold production in the area goes back to the time period of 1893–1912, when over 50,000 ozt (1,600 kg) of gold was recovered.

On March 21, 2011, Osisko finalized an agreement with Sparton Resources to acquire 60-70% of a gold property 7,500 hectares (19,000 acres) in area, in Atikokan, Ontario. The property is next to Osisko's Hammond Reef project which the company is trying to expand. The deal requires Osisko to spend $1 million on exploration in 2011. Currently there are no gold mining operations in Atikokan but the Hammond Reef project could begin production as early as 2015.

On November 22, 2011, Osisko signed an option agreement with Midland Exploration giving Osisko the ability to acquire a 50% interest in Ontario's Casault gold property. The property is just 40 km east of Detour Gold's Detour Lake gold project (one of Canada's largest deposits).

== See also ==
- Corporation minère Osiskorouyn-noranda copper mines.
