= Environmental impact of mining =

Environmental problems from uncontrolled mining

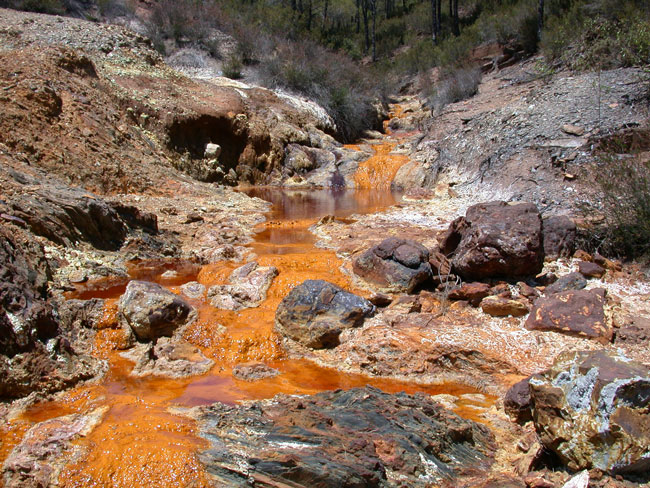
Acid mine drainage in the Rio Tinto River

Environmental impact of mining can occur at local, regional, and global scales through direct and indirect mining practices. Mining can cause erosion, sinkholes, loss of biodiversity, or the contamination of soil, groundwater, and surface water by chemicals emitted from mining processes. These processes also affect the atmosphere through carbon emissions which contributes to climate change.

Some mining methods (lithium mining, phosphate mining, coal mining, mountaintop removal mining, and sand mining) may have such significant environmental and public health effects that mining companies in some countries are required to follow strict environmental and rehabilitation codes to ensure that the mined area returns to its original state. Mining can provide various advantages to societies, yet it can also spark conflicts, particularly regarding land use both above and below the surface.

Mining operations remain rigorous and intrusive, often resulting in significant environmental impacts on local ecosystems and broader implications for planetary environmental health. To accommodate mines and associated infrastructure, land is cleared extensively, consuming significant energy and water resources, emitting air pollutants, and producing hazardous waste.

According to The World Counts page "The amount of resources mined from Earth is up from 39.3 billion tons in 2002. A 55 percent increase in less than 20 years. This puts Earth's natural resources under heavy pressure. We are already extracting 75 percent more than Earth can sustain in the long run."

== Erosion ==
Erosion of exposed hillsides, mine dumps, tailings dams and resultant siltation of drainages, creeks and rivers can significantly affect the surrounding areas, a prime example being the giant Ok Tedi Mine in Papua New Guinea. Soil erosion can decrease the water availability for plant growth, resulting in a population decline in the plant ecosystem.

Soil erosion occurs from physical disturbances caused by mining activities (e.g. excavation, blasting, etc.) in wilderness areas. This causes disturbances of tree root systems, a crucial component in stabilizing soil and preventing erosion. Eroded materials can be transported by runoff into nearby surface water, leading to a process known as sedimentation. Moreover, altered drainage patterns redirect water flow, intensifying erosion and sedimentation of nearby water bodies. The cumulative impact results in degraded water quality, loss of habitat, and long-lasting ecological damage.

== Sinkholes ==
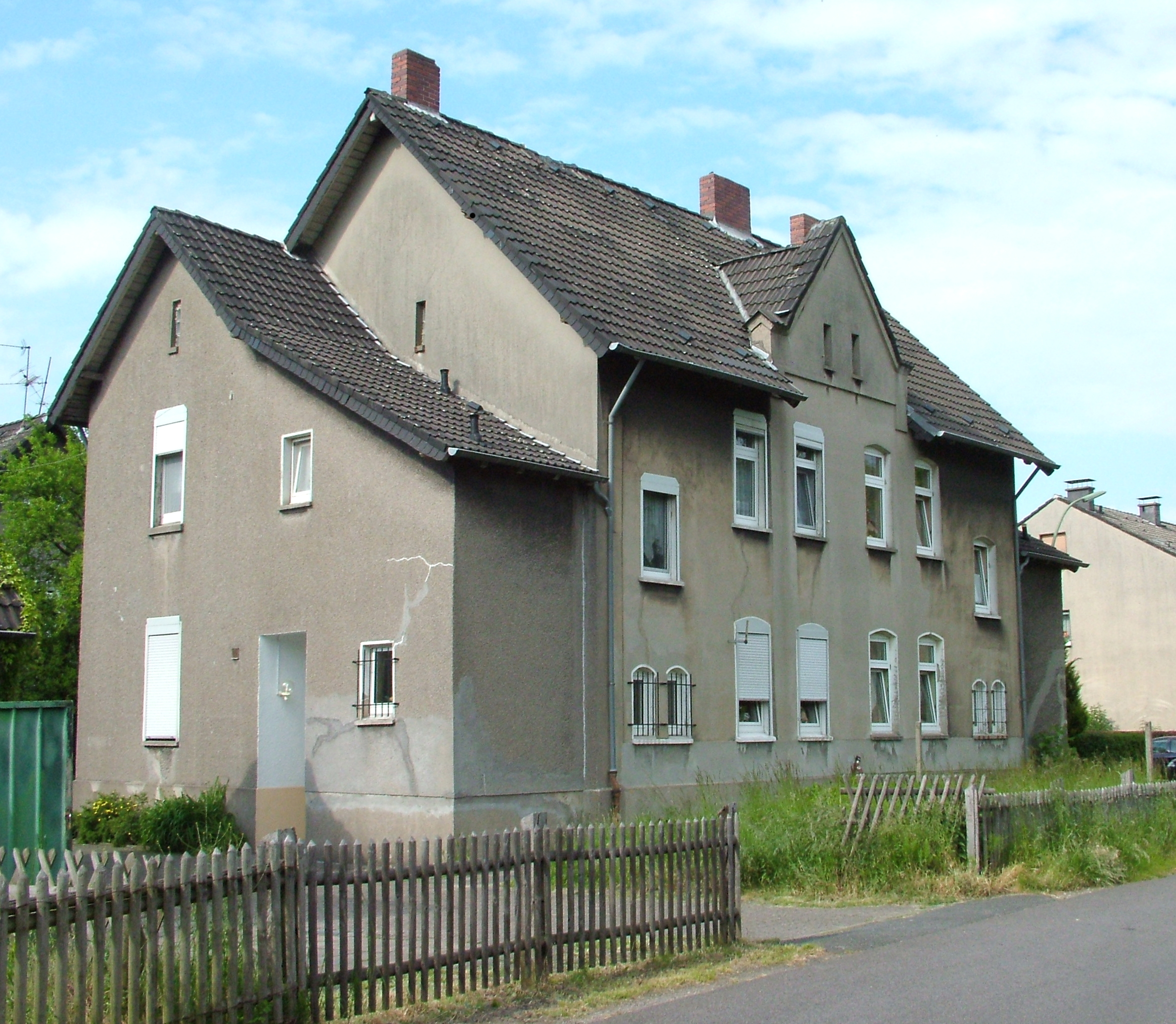
House in Gladbeck, Germany, with fissures caused by gravity erosion due to mining

A sinkhole at or near a mine site is typically caused from the failure of a mine roof from the extraction of resources, weak overburden or geological discontinuities. The overburden at the mine site can develop cavities in the subsoil or rock, which can infill with sand and soil from the overlying strata. These cavities in the overburden have the potential to eventually cave in, forming a sinkhole at the surface. The sudden failure of Earth creates a large depression at the surface without warning, which can be seriously hazardous to life and property. Sinkholes at a mine site can be mitigated with the proper design of infrastructure such as mining supports and better construction of walls to create a barrier around an area prone to sinkholes. Back-filling and grouting can be done to stabilize abandoned underground workings.

== Water pollution ==
Mining can have harmful effects on surrounding surface and groundwater. If proper precautions are not taken, unnaturally high concentrations of chemicals, such as arsenic, cyanide, sulphuric acid, and mercury can spread over a significant area of surface or subsurface water. Large amounts of water used for mine drainage, mine cooling, aqueous extraction and other mining processes increases the potential for these chemicals to contaminate ground and surface water. As mining produces copious amounts of waste water, disposal methods are limited due to contaminates within the waste water. Runoff containing these chemicals can lead to the devastation of the surrounding vegetation. The dumping of the runoff in surface waters or in a lot of forests is the worst option. Therefore, submarine tailings disposal are regarded as a better option (if the waste is pumped to great depth). Land storage and refilling of the mine after it has been depleted is even better, if no forests need to be cleared for the storage of debris. The contamination of watersheds resulting from the leakage of chemicals also has an effect on the health of the local population.

In well-regulated mines, hydrologists and geologists take careful measurements of water to take precaution to exclude any type of water contamination that could be caused by the mine's operations. The minimization of environmental degradation is enforced in American mining practices by federal and state law, by restricting operators to meet standards for the protection of surface and groundwater from contamination. This is best done through the use of non-toxic extraction processes as bioleaching. Furthermore, protection from water contamination should continue after a mine has been decommissioned, as surroundings water systems can still become contaminated years after active use.

== Air pollution ==
The mining industry contributes between 4 and 7% of global greenhouse gas emissions. The production of greenhouse gases, such as CO_{2} and CH_{4}, can occur both directly and indirectly throughout the mining process and can have significant impacts on global climate change.

Air pollutants have a negative impact on plant growth, primarily through interfering with resource accumulation. Once leaves are in close contact with the atmosphere, many air pollutants, such as O_{3} and NOx, affect the metabolic function of the leaves and interfere with net carbon fixation by the plant canopy. Air pollutants that are first deposited on the soil, such as heavy metals, first affect the functioning of roots and interfere with soil resource capture by the plant. These reductions in resource capture (production of carbohydrate through photosynthesis, mineral nutrient uptake and water uptake from the soil) will affect plant growth through changes in resource allocation to the various plant structures. When air pollution stress co-occurs with other stresses, e.g. water stress, the outcome on growth will depend on a complex interaction of processes within the plant. At the ecosystem level, air pollution can shift the competitive balance among the species present and may lead to changes in the composition of the plant community. The impacts of air pollution can vary depending on the type and concentration of pollutant released. In agroecosystems these changes may be manifest in reduced economic yield.

Adaptation and mitigation techniques to reduce air pollution created by mining are often focused on using cleaner energy sources. Switching from coal and diesel to gasoline can reduce the concentration of greenhouse gases. Furthermore, switching to renewable energy sources, such as solar power and hydropower, may reduce greenhouse gas emissions further. Air pollution may also be reduced by maximizing the efficiency of the mine and conducting a life-cycle assessment to minimize the environmental impacts.

=== Acid rock drainage ===
Sub-surface mining progresses below the water table, so water must be constantly pumped out of the mine in order to prevent flooding. When a mine is abandoned, the pumping ceases, and water floods the mine. This introduction of water is the initial step in most acid rock drainage situations.

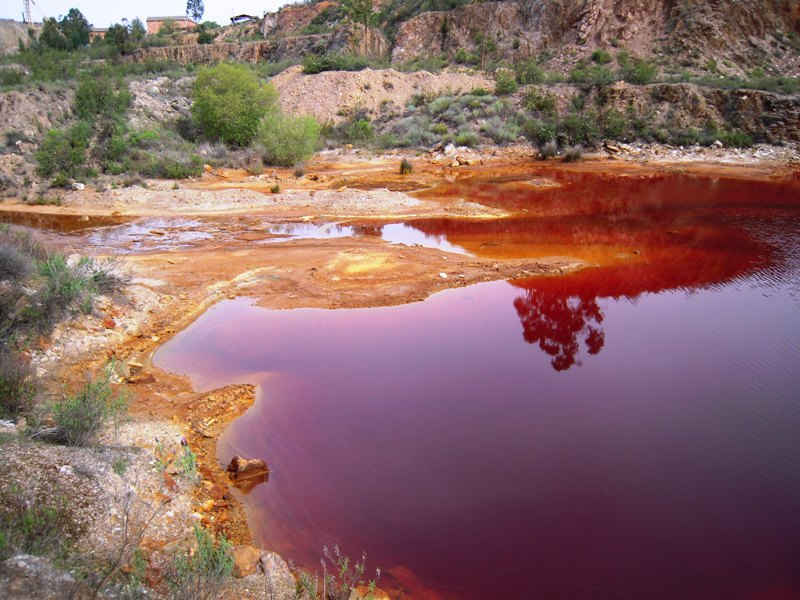
Acid mine drainage in Portugal

Acid rock drainage occurs naturally within some environments as part of the weathering process but is exacerbated by large-scale earth disturbances characteristic of mining and other large construction activities, usually within rocks containing an abundance of sulfide minerals. Areas where the earth has been disturbed (e.g. construction sites, subdivisions, and transportation corridors) may create acid rock drainage. In many localities, the liquid that drains from coal stocks, coal handling facilities, coal washeries, and coal waste tips can be highly acidic, and in such cases it is treated as acid mine drainage (AMD). The same type of chemical reactions and processes may occur through the disturbance of acid sulfate soils formed under coastal or estuarine conditions after the last major sea level rise, and constitutes a similar environmental hazard.

The five principal technologies used to monitor and control water flow at mine sites are diversion systems, containment ponds, groundwater pumping systems, subsurface drainage systems, and subsurface barriers. In the case of AMD, contaminated water is generally pumped to a treatment facility that neutralizes the contaminants. A 2006 review of environmental impact statements found that "water quality predictions made after considering the effects of mitigation largely underestimated actual impacts to groundwater, seeps, and surface water".

=== Heavy metals ===
Heavy metals are naturally occurring elements that have a high atomic weight and a density at least 5 times greater than that of water. Heavy metals are not readily degradable and therefore, are subjected to persistence in the environment and bioaccumulation in organisms. Their multiple industrial, domestic, agricultural, medical and technological applications have led to their wide distribution in the environment; raising concerns over their potential effects on human health and the environment.

Naturally occurring heavy metals are displayed in shapes that are not promptly accessible for uptake by plants. They are ordinarily displayed in insoluble shapes, like in mineral structures, or in precipitated or complex shapes that are not promptly accessible for plant take-up. Normally happening heavy metals have a high adsorption capacity in soil and are hence not promptly accessible for living organisms. However, the impacts of heavy metal transformation and interactions with soil organisms is highly dependent on the physicochemical properties of the soil and the organisms present. The holding vitality between normally happening heavy metals and soil is exceptionally high compared to that with anthropogenic sources.

Dissolution and transport of metals and heavy metals by run-off and ground water is another example of environmental problems with mining, such as the Britannia Mine, a former copper mine near Vancouver, British Columbia. Tar Creek, an abandoned mining area in Picher, Oklahoma that is now an Environmental Protection Agency Superfund site, also suffers from heavy metal contamination. Water in the mine containing dissolved heavy metals such as lead and cadmium leaked into local groundwater, contaminating it. Furthermore, the presence of heavy metals in freshwater may also affect the water chemistry. High concentrations of heavy metals can impact pH, buffering capacity, and dissolved oxygen. Long-term storage of tailings and dust can lead to additional problems, as they can be easily blown off site by wind, as occurred at Skouriotissa, an abandoned copper mine in Cyprus. Environmental changes such as global warming and increased mining activity may increase the content of heavy metals in the stream sediments. These impacts may also be enhanced in areas located downstream from the heavy metal source.

== Effect on biodiversity ==
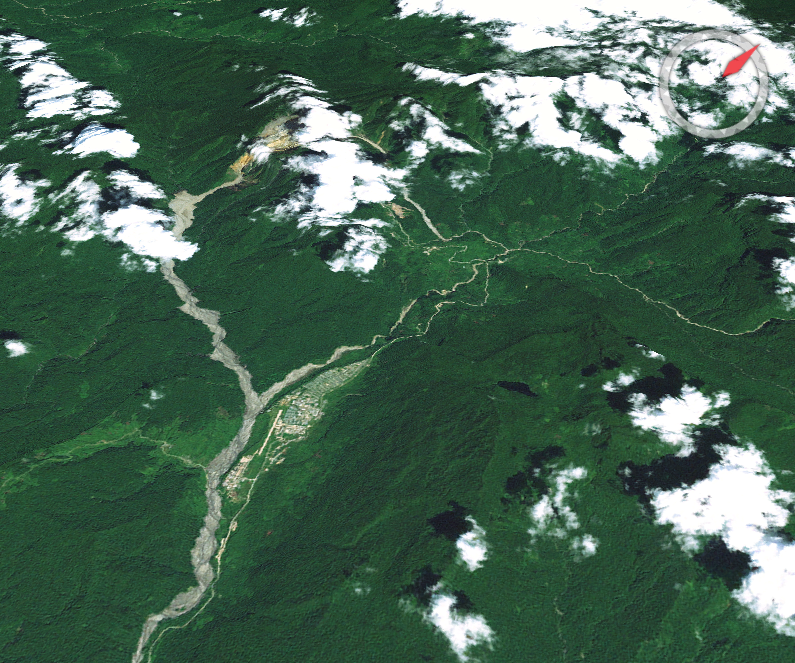
The Ok Tedi River is contaminated by tailings from a nearby mine.

Mining impacts biodiversity across various spatial dimensions. Locally, the immediate effects are seen through direct habitat destruction at the mining sites. On a broader scale, mining activities contribute to significant environmental problems such as pollution and climate change, which have regional and global repercussions. Consequently, conservation strategies need to be multifaceted and geographically inclusive, tackling both the direct impacts at specific sites and the more extensive, far-reaching environmental consequences. The implantation of a mine is a major habitat modification, and smaller perturbations occur on a larger scale than exploitation site, mine-waste residuals contamination of the environment for example. Adverse effects can be observed long after the end of the mine activity. Destruction or drastic modification of the original site and anthropogenic substances release can have major impact on biodiversity in the area. Destruction of the habitat is the main component of biodiversity losses, but direct poisoning caused by mine-extracted material, and indirect poisoning through food and water, can also affect animals, vegetation and microorganisms. Habitat modification such as pH and temperature modification disturb communities in the surrounding area. Endemic species are especially sensitive, since they require very specific environmental conditions. Destruction or slight modification of their habitat put them at the risk of extinction. Habitats can be damaged when there is not enough terrestrial product as well as by non-chemical products, such as large rocks from the mines that are discarded in the surrounding landscape with no concern for impacts on natural habitat.

Concentrations of heavy metals are known to decrease with distance from the mine, and effects on biodiversity tend to follow the same pattern. Impacts can vary greatly depending on mobility and bioavailability of the contaminant: less-mobile molecules will stay inert in the environment while highly mobile molecules will easily move into another compartment or be taken up by organisms. For example, speciation of metals in sediments could modify their bioavailability, and thus their toxicity for aquatic organisms.

Biomagnification plays an important role in polluted habitats: mining impacts on biodiversity, assuming that concentration levels are not high enough to directly kill exposed organisms, should be greater to the species on top of the food chain because of this phenomenon.

Adverse mining effects on biodiversity depend a great extent on the nature of the contaminant, the level of concentration at which it can be found in the environment, and the nature of the ecosystem itself. Some species are quite resistant to anthropogenic disturbances, while some others will completely disappear from the contaminated zone. Time alone does not seem to allow the habitat to recover completely from the contamination. Remediation practices take time, and in most cases will not enable the recovery of the original diversity present before the mining activity took place.

=== Aquatic organisms ===
The mining industry can impact aquatic biodiversity through different ways. One way can be direct poisoning; a higher risk for this occurs when contaminants are mobile in the sediment or bioavailable in the water. Mine drainage can modify water pH, making it hard to differentiate direct impact on organisms from impacts caused by pH changes. Effects can nonetheless be observed and proven to be caused by pH modifications. Contaminants can also affect aquatic organisms through physical effects: streams with high concentrations of suspended sediment limit light, thus diminishing algae biomass. Metal oxide deposition can limit biomass by coating algae or their substrate, thereby preventing colonization.

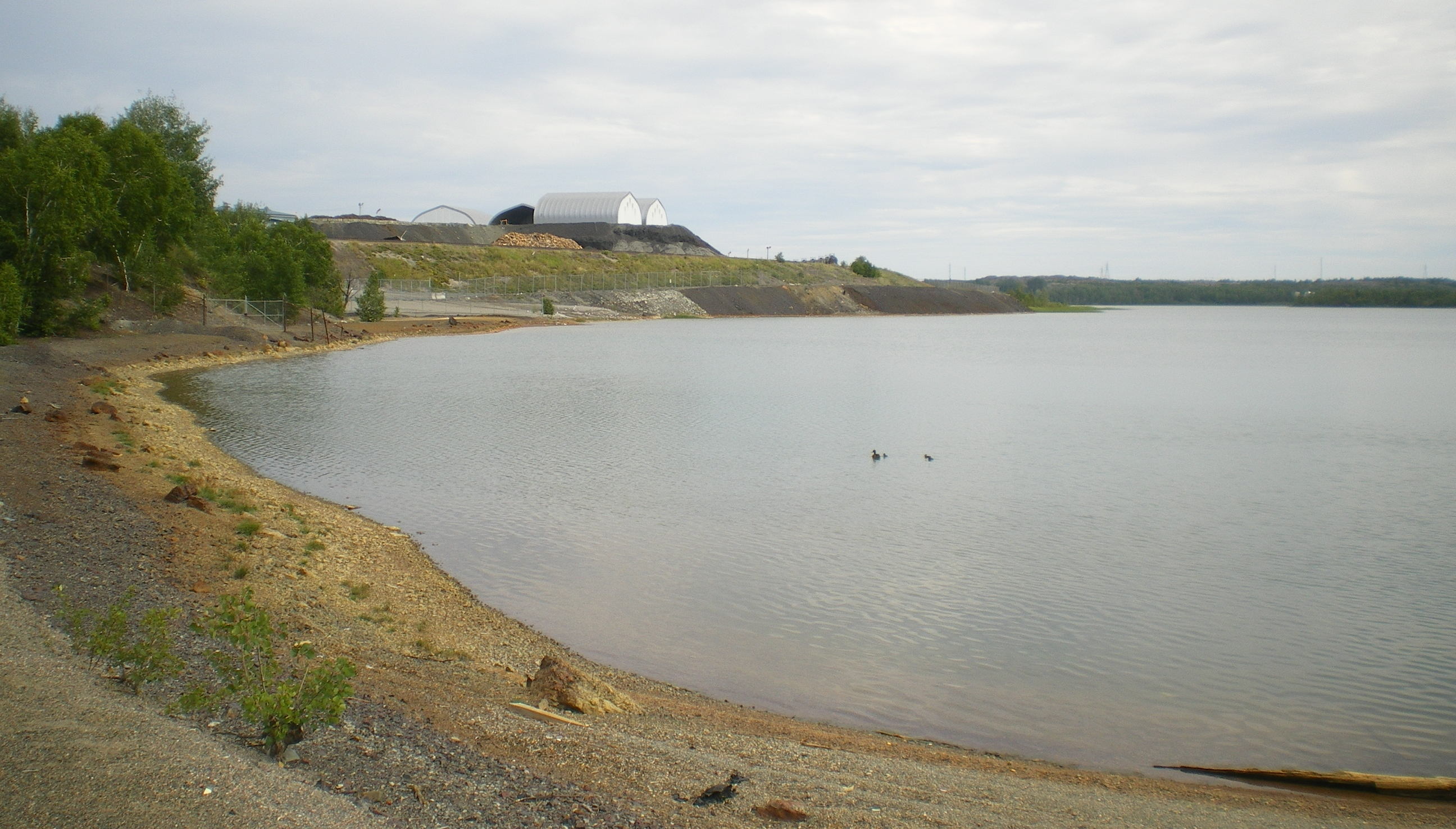
Contaminated Osisko lake in Rouyn-Noranda

Factors that impact communities in acid mine drainage sites vary temporarily and seasonally: temperature, rainfall, pH, salinisation and metal quantity all display variations on the long term, and can heavily affect communities. Changes in pH or temperature can affect metal solubility, and thereby the bioavailable quantity that directly impact organisms. Moreover, contamination persists over time: ninety years after a pyrite mine closure, water pH was still very low and microorganisms populations consisted mainly of acidophil bacteria.

One big case study that was considered extremely toxic to aquatic organisms was the contamination that occurred in Minamata Bay. Methylmercury was released into wastewater by industrial chemical company's and a disease called Minamata disease was discovered in Kumamoto, Japan. This resulted in mercury poisoning in fishes and shellfishes and it was contaminating surrounding species and many died from it and it impacted anyone that ate the contaminated fishes. Another significant case study illuminates the impact of phosphate mining on coral reef development adjacent to Christmas Island. In this scenario, phosphate-rich runoff was transported from local waterways to coral reefs off the coast, where reef sediment phosphate levels reached some of the highest levels ever recorded in Australian reefs at 54,000 mg/kg. Phosphate contamination has resulted in a noticeable decline in keystone reef-building species, such as crustose coralline algae and branching coral. This decline is likely due to phosphorus serving as a fertilizer for macro algae, allowing them to outcompete calcareous organisms.

==== Microorganisms ====
Algae communities are less diverse in acidic water containing high zinc concentration, and mine drainage stress decrease their primary production. Diatoms' community is greatly modified by any chemical change, pH phytoplankton assemblage, and high metal concentration diminishes the abundance of planktonic species. Some diatom species may grow in high-metal-concentration sediments. In sediments close to the surface, cysts suffer from corrosion and heavy coating. In very polluted conditions, total algae biomass is quite low, and the planktonic diatom community is missing. Similarly to phytoplankton, the zooplankton communities are heavily altered in cases where the mining impact is severe. In case of functional complementary, however, it is possible that the phytoplankton and zooplankton mass remains stable.

When assessing the potential risks of mining to marine microbiomes, it is important to broaden the scope to include other vulnerable communities, such as those found at the seafloor, which are at risk of ecosystem degradation due to deep-sea mining. Microbial life plays a vital role in fulfilling a variety of niches and supporting the productivity of biogeochemical cycles within seafloor ecosystems. Primary zones of deep-sea mining include operational hydrothermal vents along spreading centers (e.g., mid-ocean ridges, volcanic arcs) on the ocean floor where sulfide minerals were deposited. Other extraction zones include inactive hydrothermal vents with similar mineral deposits, polymetallic protuberances (mainly manganese) along the ocean floor, and sometimes polymetallic crusts (cobalt crusts) left behind at seamounts. These mineral deposits are often found in exotic ecosystems capable of surviving under extreme chemical conditions and abnormally high temperatures. Resource extraction has only increased over time, leading to the potential for significant losses of microbial ecosystem services at hydrothermal vents and increased ecosystem service degradation at inactive massive sulfide deposits. Potential drivers of ecosystem degradation via deepsea mining include acidification, the release of toxic heavy metals, removal of slow-growing benthic fauna, burial and respiration impairment of benthic organisms from the generation of sediment plumes, and disruption of the food supply chain among benthopelagic species. These potential outcomes can alter the chemical balance of these environments, leading to a cascade of declines in benthic and pelagic species that rely on hydrothermal vents as sources of nutrient availability. Ensuring the preservation of hydrothermal microbes and the species that depend on them is critical for retaining the rich biodiversity of seafloor environments and the ecosystem services they provide

==== Macro-organisms ====
Water insect and crustacean communities are modified around a mine, resulting in a low tropic completeness and their community being dominated by predators. However, biodiversity of macroinvertebrates can remain high if sensitive species are replaced with tolerant ones. When diversity within the area is reduced, there is sometimes no effect of stream contamination on abundance or biomass, suggesting that tolerant species fulfilling the same function take the place of sensible species in polluted sites. pH diminution in addition to elevated metal concentration can also have adverse effects on macroinvertebrates' behaviour, showing that direct toxicity is not the only issue. Fish can also be affected by pH, temperature variations, and chemical concentrations.

=== Terrestrial organisms ===
==== Vegetation ====
Soil texture and water content can be greatly modified in disturbed sites, leading to plants community changes in the area. Most of the plants have a low concentration tolerance for metals in the soil, but sensitivity differs among species. Grass diversity and total coverage is less affected by high contaminant concentration than forbs and shrubs. Mine waste-materials rejects or traces due to mining activity can be found in the vicinity of the mine, sometimes far away from the source. Mine tailings generated from mining operations usually contain high amounts of heavy metals such as arsenic, lead and mercury. These can enter into surrounding soils and water systems causing long term toxic effects. Established plants cannot move away from perturbations, and will eventually die if their habitat is contaminated by heavy metals or metalloids at a concentration that is too elevated for their physiology. Some species are more resistant and will survive these levels, and some non-native species that can tolerate these concentrations in the soil, will migrate in the surrounding lands of the mine to occupy the ecological niche. This can also leave the soil vulnerable to potential soil erosion, which would make it inhabitable for plants. On highly eroded slopes of former mining sites, vegetation colonization can be significantly lower, reducing habitat recovery.

Plants can be affected through direct poisoning, for example arsenic soil content reduces bryophyte diversity. Vegetation can also be contaminated from other metals as well such as nickel and copper. Soil acidification through pH diminution by chemical contamination can also lead to a diminished species number. Contaminants can modify or disturb microorganisms, thus modifying nutrient availability, causing a loss of vegetation in the area. Some tree roots divert away from deeper soil layers in order to avoid the contaminated zone, therefore lacking anchorage within the deep soil layers, resulting in the potential uprooting by the wind when their height and shoot weight increase. In general, root exploration is reduced in contaminated areas compared to non-polluted ones. Plant species diversity will remain lower in reclaimed habitats than in undisturbed areas. Depending on what specific type of mining is done, all vegetation can be initially removed from the area before the actual mining is started.

Cultivated crops might be a problem near mines. Most crops can grow on weakly contaminated sites, but yield is generally lower than it would have been in regular growing conditions. Plants also tend to accumulate heavy metals in their aerial organs, possibly leading to human intake through fruits and vegetables. Regular consumption of contaminated crops might lead to health problems caused by long-term metal exposure. Cigarettes made from tobacco growing on contaminated sites might also possibly have adverse effects on human population, as tobacco tends to accumulate cadmium and zinc in its leaves.

Moreover, plants which have a high tendency to accumulate heavy metals, such as Noccaea caerulescens, may be used for phytoextraction. In the phytoextraction process, plants will extract heavy metals present in the soil, and store them in portions of the plant which can be easily harvested. Once the plant which has accumulated the heavy metals is harvested, the stored heavy metals are effectively removed from the soil.

==== Animals ====
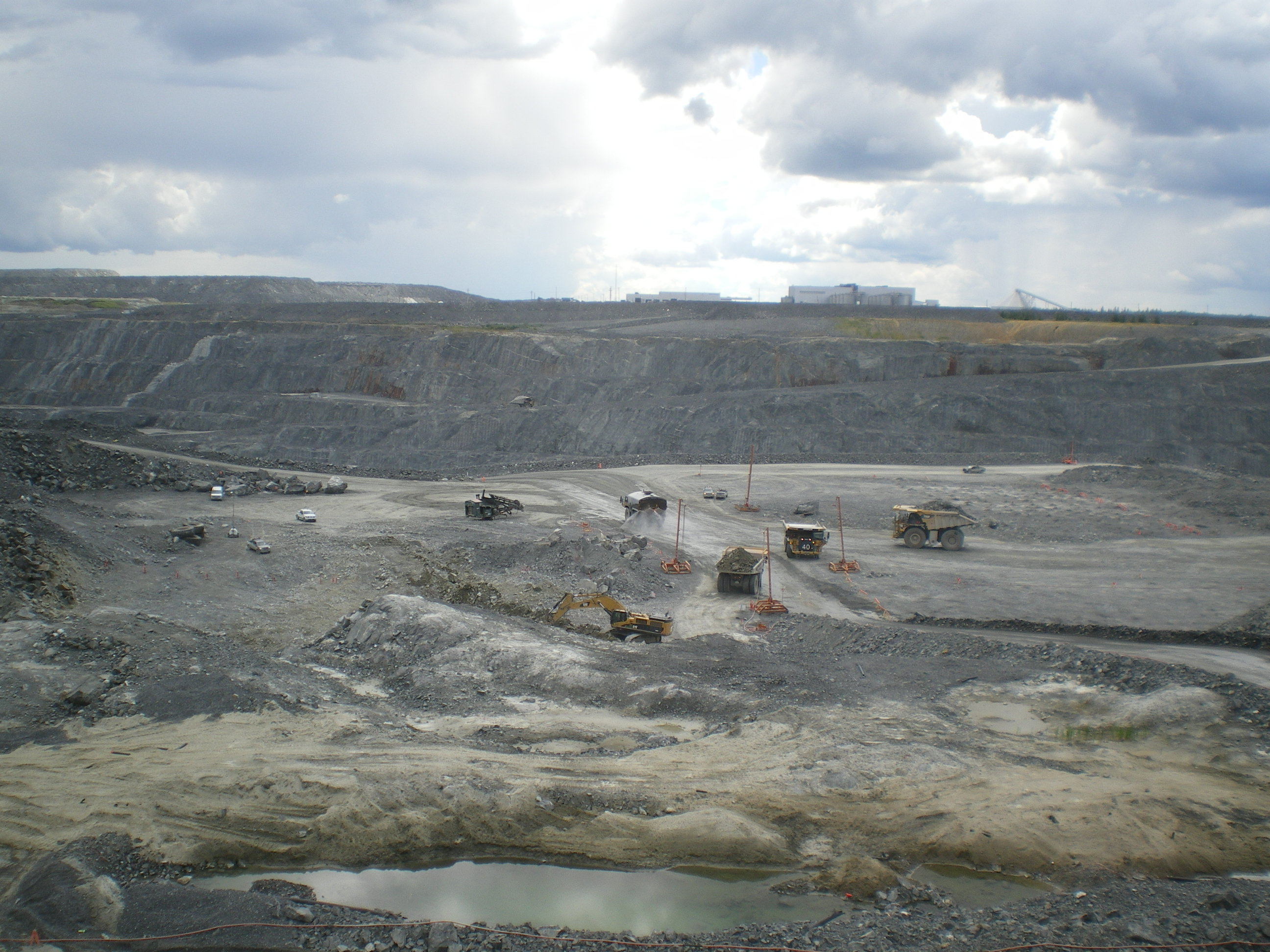
Malartic mine - Osisko

Habitat destruction is one of the main issues of mining activity. Huge areas of natural habitat are destroyed during mine construction and exploitation, forcing animals to leave the site. In addition, desirable minerals exist across all biodiversity-rich areas, and future mineral demands are expected to rise. This indicates a significant risk for animal biodiversity, considering mining is believed to have some of the most profound negative impacts on local fauna, such as reducing the availability of food and shelter, which in turn limits the number of individuals a region can sustain. Moreover, mineral exploitation poses additional threats to wildlife beyond habitat degradation, mining is believed to produce adverse impacts on wildlife in forms such as soil and water contamination, suppression of vegetation, and modifications in landscape structure.

Landscape alterations, in particular, pose a significant threat to medium and large-sized forest-dependent mammals that require large areas to meet their needs. Medium-large mammals vary in their tolerance to anthropogenically driven changes to their ecosystems; this impacts their ability to find food, move, and avoid hunting pressures. These same fauna are responsible for shaping the structure of forested areas via processes such as predation, trampling of low-lying vegetation, and seed consumption/dispersion. Outside of physically altering the structure of local landscapes, mining can also produce large amounts of residual waste reducing the quality of air and water, thereby reducing the amount of accessible land for large mammals. This relationship has been highlighted in iron-rich areas of India where mining's anthropogenic impacts have been reduced by regulations on waste production, mitigating the adverse effects of mineral extraction on local fauna such as elephants. While mining is believed to directly impact fauna near the extraction site, it may also have indirect effects on mammal biodiversity by driving the construction of roads and infrastructure accommodating mining company employees. There remains a glaring gap in studies regarding the indirect impacts of mining on mammals, indicating that we must advocate for incentives to support studies aimed at testing the health of these larger mammals. This will allow for more effective conservation efforts to preserve animal biodiversity.

One case study demonstrating the impacts of mining on animal biodiversity takes place in Western Ghana. Over the past several decades mining activities have rapidly expanded across Africa; this has driven large-scale deforestation and increased human settlement in the mineral-rich eastern and western regions of Brong-Ahafo (forest land in Ghana). Increased settlement has facilitated migration of loggers, miners, other workers creating further stress on forested areas, with many migrants utilizing hunting for wild animals to collect bushmeat. This example highlights a significant indirect impact of mining on local fauna in the Brong-Ahafo forest land. In this region, researchers utilized Sherman collapsible live traps for nine small mammal species (e.g. H. alleni, P. tullbergi, H. trivirgatus, etc.) to explore if there were any differences in fauna biodiversity between mining-impacted areas and areas without significant impacts from mining. After recording several captures in both areas, it was concluded that mining-impacted forests had lower levels of fauna biodiversity in comparison to their counterparts, indicating that mining definitely hurt local animal biodiversity. This scenario, exemplifies the profound ecological repercussions of mining on fauna biodiversity and highlights the urgent need for implementation of conservation strategies to mitigate the impacts of mineral extraction on local wildlife populations.

Animals can be poisoned directly by mine products and residuals. Bioaccumulation in the plants or the smaller organisms they eat can also lead to poisoning: in certain areas horses, goats and sheep are exposed to potentially toxic concentrations of copper and lead in grass. There are fewer ant species in soil containing high copper levels, in the vicinity of a copper mine. If fewer ants are found, chances are higher that other organisms living in the surrounding landscape are strongly affected by the high copper levels as well. Ants have good judgement whether an area is habitual as they live directly in the soil and are thus sensitive to environmental disruptions.

==== Microorganisms ====
Microorganisms are extremely sensitive to environmental modification, such as modified pH, temperature changes or chemical concentrations due to their size. For example, the presence of arsenic and antimony in soils have led to diminution in total soil bacteria. Much like waters sensitivity, a small change in the soil pH can provoke the remobilization of contaminants, in addition to the direct impact on pH-sensitive organisms.

Microorganisms have a wide variety of genes among their total population, so there is a greater chance of survival of the species due to the resistance or tolerance genes in that some colonies possess, as long as modifications are not too extreme. Nevertheless, survival in these conditions will imply a big loss of gene diversity, resulting in a reduced potential for adaptations to subsequent changes. Undeveloped soil in heavy metal contaminated areas could be a sign of reduced activity by soils microfauna and microflora, indicating a reduced number of individuals or diminished activity. Twenty years after disturbance, even in rehabilitation area, microbial biomass is still greatly reduced compared to undisturbed habitat.

Arbuscular mycorrhiza fungi are especially sensitive to the presence of chemicals, and the soil is sometimes so disturbed that they are no longer able to associate with root plants. However, some fungi possess contaminant accumulation capacity and soil cleaning ability by changing the biodisponibility of pollutants, this can protect plants from potential damages that could be caused by chemicals. Their presence in contaminated sites could prevent loss of biodiversity due to mine-waste contamination, or allow for bioremediation, the removal of undesired chemicals from contaminated soils. On the contrary, some microbes can deteriorate the environment: which can lead to elevated SO4 in the water and can also increase microbial production of hydrogen sulfide, a toxin for many aquatic plants and organisms.

== Waste materials ==
=== Tailings ===
Mining processes produce an excess of waste materials known as tailings. The materials that are left over after are a result of separating the valuable fraction from the uneconomic fraction of ore. These large amounts of waste are a mixture of water, sand, clay, and residual bitumen. Tailings are commonly stored in tailings ponds made from naturally existing valleys or large engineered dams and dyke systems. Tailings ponds can remain part of an active mine operation for 30–40 years. This allows for tailings deposits to settle, or for storage and water recycling.

Tailings have great potential to damage the environment by releasing toxic metals by acid mine drainage or by damaging aquatic wildlife; these both require constant monitoring and treatment of water passing through the dam. However, the greatest danger of tailings ponds is dam failure. Tailings ponds are typically formed by locally derived fills (soil, coarse waste, or overburden from mining operations and tailings) and the dam walls are often built up on to sustain greater amounts of tailings. The lack of regulation for design criteria of the tailings ponds are what put the environment at risk for flooding from the tailings ponds.

Some heavy metals that accumulate in tailings, such as thorium, are linked to increase cancer risk. The tailings around China's Bayan Obo mine contains 70 000 tons of thorium. Contaminated groundwater is moving towards the Yellow River due to the absence of an impermeable lining for the tailing dam.

=== Spoil tip ===
A spoil tip is a pile of accumulated overburden that was removed from a mine site during the extraction of coal or ore. These waste materials are composed of ordinary soil and rocks, with the potential to be contaminated with chemical waste. Spoil is much different from tailings, which are processed material that remains after the valuable components have been extracted from ore. Spoil tip combustion can happen fairly commonly as, older spoil tips tend to be loose and tip over the edge of a pile. As spoil is mainly composed of carbonaceous material that is highly combustible, it can be accidentally ignited by the lighting fire or the tipping of hot ashes. Spoil tips can often catch fire and be left burning underground or within the spoil piles for many years.

== Effects of mine pollution on humans ==
Humans are also affected by mining. There are many diseases that can come from the pollutants that are released into the air and water during the mining process. For example, during smelting operations large quantities of air pollutants, such as the suspended particulate matter, SO_{x}, arsenic particles and cadmium, are emitted. Metals are usually emitted into the air as particulates as well. There are also many occupational health hazards that miners face. Most of miners suffer from various respiratory and skin diseases such as asbestosis, silicosis, or black lung disease.

Furthermore, one of the biggest subset of mining that impacts humans is the pollutants that end up in the water, which results in poor water quality. About 30% of the world has access to renewable freshwater which is used by industries that generate large amounts of waste containing chemicals in various concentrations that are deposited into the freshwater. The concern of active chemicals in the water can pose a great risk to human health as it can accumulate within the water and fishes. There was a study done on an abandon mine in China, Dabaoshan mine and this mine was not active to many years yet the impact of how metals can accumulate in water and soil was a major concern for neighboring villages. In a study done on the Tapajos basin in Brazil, 75% of people tested had unsafe levels of mercury in their blood. Due to the lack of proper care of waste materials 56% of mortality rate is estimated within the regions around this mining sites, and many have been diagnosed with esophageal cancer and liver cancer. It resulted that this mine till this day still has negative impacts on human health through crops and it is evident that there needs to be more cleaning up measures around surrounding areas.

The long-term effects associated with air pollution are plenty including chronic asthma, pulmonary insufficiency, and cardiovascular mortality. According to a Swedish cohort study, diabetes seems to be induced after long-term air pollution exposure. Furthermore, air pollution seems to have various malign health effects in early human life, such as respiratory, cardiovascular, mental, and perinatal disorders, leading to infant mortality or chronic disease in adult age. Discuss contamination basically influences those living in huge urban zones, where street outflows contribute the foremost to the degradation of discuss quality. There's moreover a threat of mechanical mishaps, where the spread of a harmful haze can be lethal to the populaces of the encompassing regions. The scattering of poisons is decided by numerous parameters, most outstandingly barometrical soundness and wind.

== Deforestation ==
With open cast mining the overburden, which may be covered in forest, must be removed before the mining can commence. Although the deforestation due to mining may be small compared to the total amount, it may lead to species extinction if there is a high level of local endemism.

Strip mining can destroy landscapes, forests, and wildlife habitats that are near the sites. Trees, plants and topsoil are cleared from the mining area, preventing forest growth. Environmental impacts from deforestation still occur after the mining site is completed due to the loss of vegetation and soil, which limits the ability of natural ground cover to recolonize lost habitat. Legal mining, albeit more environmentally-controlled than illegal mining, contributes to some substantial percentage to the deforestation of tropical countries.

Open-pit nickel mining has led to environmental degradation and pollution in developing countries such as the Philippines and Indonesia. In 2024, nickel mining and processing was one of the main causes of deforestation in Indonesia. Open-pit cobalt mining has led to deforestation and habitat destruction in the Democratic Republic of Congo.

== Impacts associated with specific types of mining ==
=== Coal mining ===
The environmental factors of the coal industry are not only impacting air pollution, water management and land use but also is causing severe health effects by the burning of the coal. Air pollution is increasing in numbers of toxins such as mercury, lead, sulfur dioxide, nitrogen oxides and other heavy metals. This is causing health issues involving breathing difficulties and is impacting the wildlife around the surrounding areas that needs clean air to survive. The future of air pollution remains unclear as the Environmental Protection Agency has tried to prevent some emissions but don't have control measures in place for all plants producing mining of coal. Water pollution is another factor that is being damaged throughout this process of mining coals, the ashes from coal is usually carried away in rainwater which streams into larger water sites. It can take up to 10 years to clean water sites that have coal waste and the potential of damaging clean water can only make the filtration much more difficult.

=== Deep sea mining ===
Deep sea mining for manganese nodules and other resources have led to concerns from marine scientists and environmental groups over the impact on fragile deep sea ecosystems. Knowledge of potential impacts is limited due to limited research on deep sea life.

=== Lithium mining ===
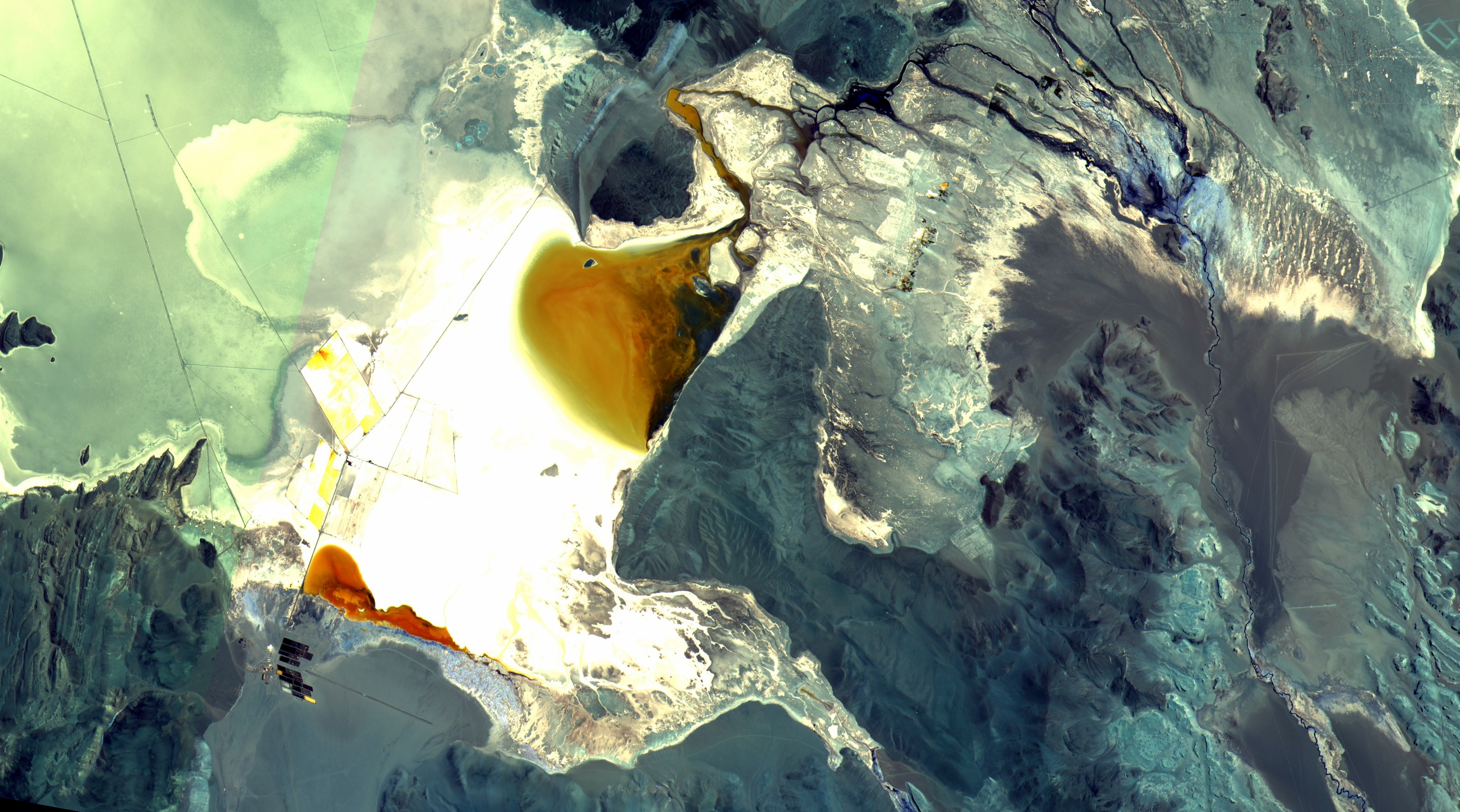
Lithium mining at Salar del Hombre Muerto, Argentina

Lithium does not occur as the metal naturally since it is highly reactive, but is found combined in small amounts in rocks, soils, and bodies of water. The extraction of lithium in rock form can be exposed to air, water, and soil. Furthermore, batteries are globally demanded for containing lithium in regards to manufacturing, the toxic chemicals that lithium produce can negatively impact humans, soils, and marine species. Lithium production increased by 25% between 2000 and 2007 for the use of batteries, and the major sources of lithium are found in brine lake deposits. Lithium is discovered and extracted from 150 minerals, clays, numerous brines, and sea water, and although lithium extraction from rock-form is twice as expensive from that of lithium extracted from brines, the average brine deposit is greater than in comparison to an average lithium hard rock deposit.

=== Phosphate mining ===
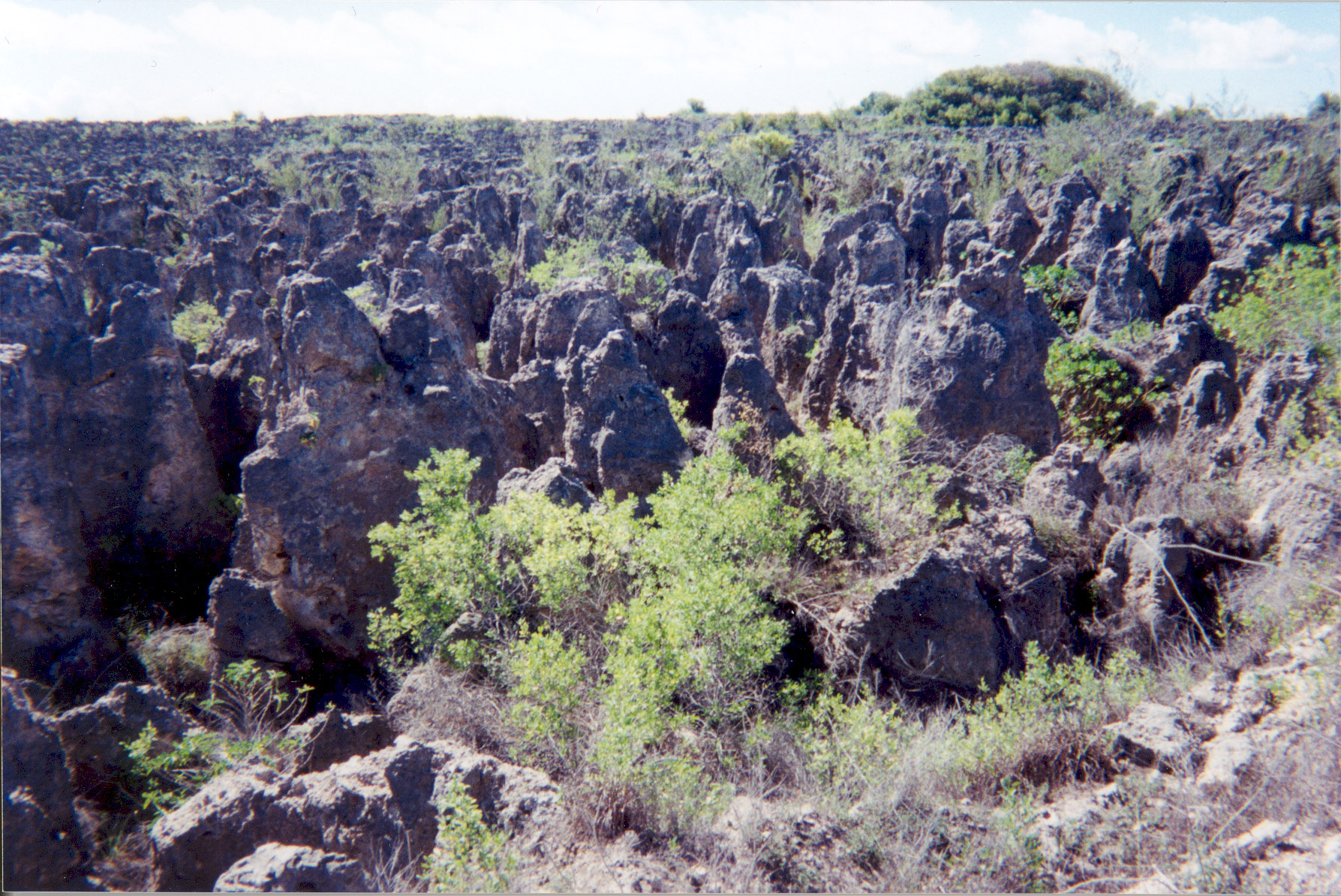
A limestone karst on Nauru Island influenced by phosphate mining

Phosphate-bearing rocks are mined to produce phosphorus, an essential element used in industry and agriculture. The process of extraction includes removal of surface vegetation, thereby exposing phosphorus rocks to the terrestrial ecosystem, damaging the land area with exposed phosphorus, resulting in ground erosion. The products released from phosphate ore mining are wastes, and tailings, resulting in human exposure to particulate matter from contaminated tailings via inhalation and the toxic elements that impact human health are (Cd, Cr, Zn, Cu and Pb).

=== Oil shale mining ===
Oil shale is a sedimentary rock containing kerogen which hydrocarbons can be produced. Mining oil shale impacts the environment it can damage the biological land and ecosystems. The thermal heating and combustion generate a lot of material and waste that includes carbon dioxide and greenhouse gas. Many environmentalists are against the production and usage of oil shale because it creates large amounts of greenhouse gasses. Among air pollution, water contamination is a huge factor mainly because oil shales are dealing with oxygen and hydrocarbons. There is changes in the landscape with mining sites due to oil shale mining and the production using chemical products. The ground movements within the area of underground mining is a problem that is long-term because it causes non-stabilized areas. Underground mining causes a new formation that can be suitable for some plant growth, but rehabilitation could be required.

=== Mountaintop removal mining ===
Mountaintop removal mining (MTR) occurs when trees are cut down, and coal seams are removed by machines and explosives. As a result, the landscape is more susceptible to flash flooding and causing potential pollution from the chemicals. The critical zone disturbed by mountaintop removal causes degraded stream water quality towards the marine and terrestrial ecosystems and thus mountaintop removal mining affect hydrologic response and long-term watersheds.

=== Sand mining ===
Sand mining and gravel mining creates large pits and fissures in the earth's surface. At times, mining can extend so deeply that it affects ground water, springs, underground wells, and the water table. The major threats of sand mining activities include channel bed degradation, river formation and erosion. Sand mining has resulted in an increase of water turbidity in the majority offshore of Lake Hongze, the fourth largest freshwater lake located in China.

== Mitigation ==
Various mitigation techniques exist to reduce the impacts of mining on the environment; however, the technique deployed is often dependent on the type of environment and severity of the impact. To ensure completion of reclamation, or restoring mine land for future use, many governments and regulatory authorities around the world require that mining companies post a bond to be held in escrow until productivity of reclaimed land has been convincingly demonstrated, although if cleanup procedures are more expensive than the size of the bond, the bond may simply be abandoned. Furthermore, effective mitigation is highly dependent on government policy, economic resources, and the implementation of new technology. Since 1978 the mining industry has reclaimed more than 2 million acres (8,000 km^{2}) of land in the United States alone. This reclaimed land has renewed vegetation and wildlife in previous mining lands and can even be used for farming and ranching.

== Specific sites ==
- Tui mine in New Zealand
- Stockton mine in New Zealand
- Northland Pyrite Mine in Temagami, Ontario, Canada
- Sherman Mine in Temagami, Ontario, Canada
- Ok Tedi Mine in Western Province, Papua New Guinea
- The Berkeley Pit
- Wheal Jane Mines

== See also ==
- Environmental impact of deep sea mining
- Environmental effects of placer mining
- Environmental impact of gold mining
- Environmental impact of zinc mining
- List of environmental issues
- Appalachian Voices, a lobby group in the United States
- Mining
- Natural resource
