= Louis de Mauris, Vicomte de Malartic =

Louis Hippolyte Joseph de Mauris, Vicomte de Malartic (1769–1832) was a French aristocrat and military officer who served in the French Army as well as in the United States Army in the late 18th and early 19th centuries.

== Early life and career ==
He was born on 1 March 1769; he attended the French Military School at the age of 14. He graduated in 1784 and was commissioned a sub-lieutenant. He joined the French Guards as an ensign, and in 1789 transferred to the artillery company in that unit.

== Military campaigns in United States ==
As the French Revolution unfolded, he left France in 1790 following the disbanding of the French Guards for the United States. Once there he moved to Gallipolis, a frontier settlement in Ohio. He participated in two military campaigns against the Native American tribes of the Northwest frontier during his time on the frontier.

In 1791, Malartic served as a volunteer aide-de-camp for Major General Arthur St. Clair in his operation against the Indians of the Northwest frontier that culminated in the disastrous battle at the Wabash river known as St. Clair's Defeat and the destruction of the U.S. Army. Malartic himself was wounded at the battle.

== Return to France ==
After his recovery, he returned to France to join the military forces attempting to restore the monarchy. He remained in military service to the pretender in exile during the Revolution, serving as well in Prussian and Austrian service, eventually rising to become field marshal in 1799 under Louis XVIII. He returned to France in 1814, and remained in military service until 1830, when, unwilling to support Louis Philippe I after the July Revolution, he resigned.

== Legacy ==
The town of Malartic, Quebec is named after him.
