= Waldschloss Restaurant, Bytom =

Coordinates: 50°22′32″N 18°52′51″E

Waldschloss Restaurant
- Etablissement Waldschloss
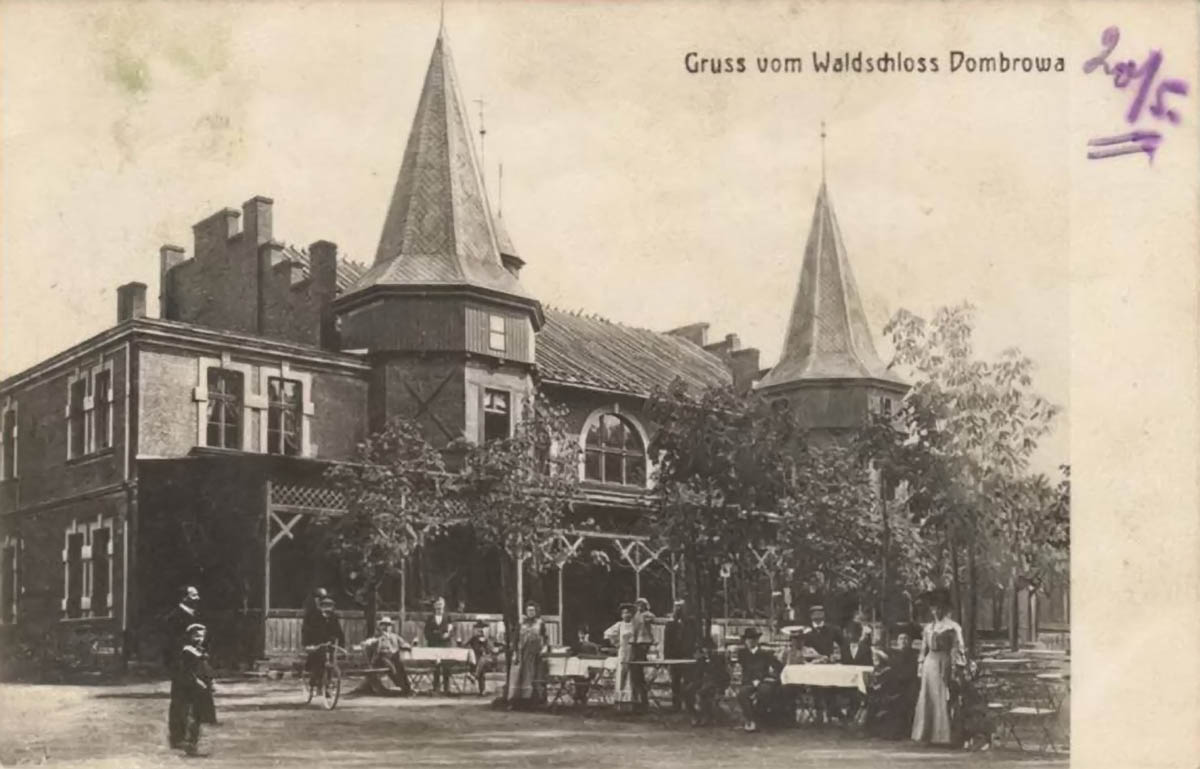
- Postcard of the Waldschloss Restaurant, 1908
- Interactive map of the Waldschloss Restaurant area

General information
- Type: Restaurant
- Location: Beuthen, German Empire
- Completed: Late 19th century
- Demolished: 1930s
- Owner: Arthur Limmert

Design and construction
- Architect: Arthur Limmert

The Waldschloss Restaurant (German: Waldschloss, Polish: Zameczek leśny) was a restaurant building located in present-day Dąbrowa Miejska district of Bytom. The building was demolished in the 1930s due to mining damages.

== History ==
The Waldschloss (lit. 'Forest Palace') was raised in the city park in Beuthen by Arthur Limmert.
Since the late 19th century, the location had been a spot of relaxation for wealthy inhabitants of Beuthen where they could dine, drink, dance and enjoy entertainment. Later on, the establishment appealed to a wider audience, gaining popularity among local workers who often dined and visited with their families after their labour-intensive shifts in Upper Silesia's coal mines and steel mills.

A forest park (Waldpark) was built around the restaurant with numerous benches, alleys and fields; In 1914 the restaurant was connected directly to the city centre of Beuthen via tramway. Due to mining damages the building was demolished in the 1930s.

In 1935 a second Waldschloss was built in the original restaurant's place. The second restaurant was demolished in the 1970s, similarly as a result of mining damages. In the present-day only minor remnants remain of the original establishment, i.e. bricks strewn around and overgrown tramway tracks.

== Gallery ==
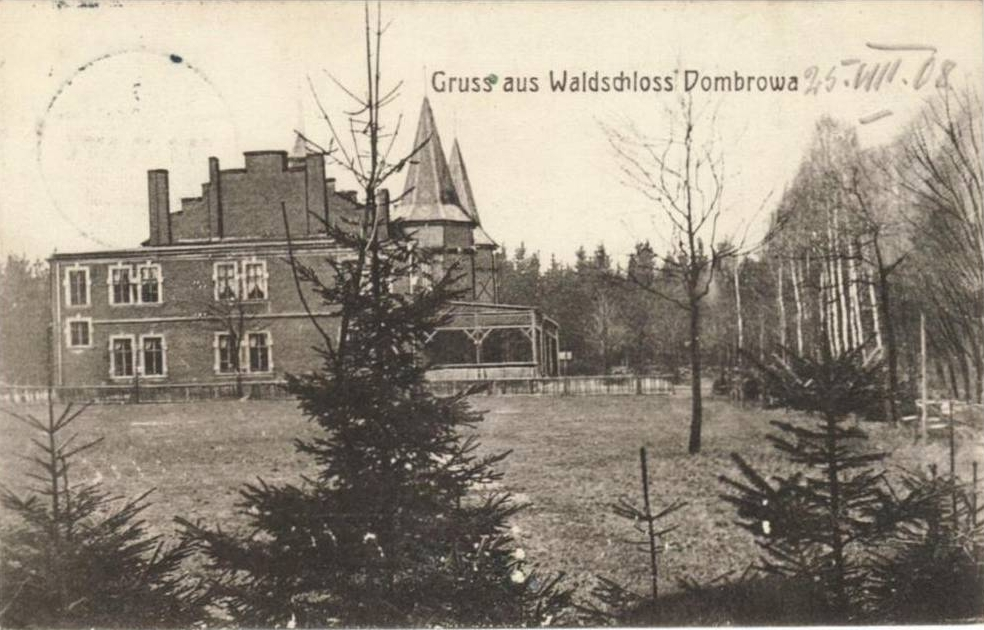
Postcard of Waldschloss Restaurant, c. 1908

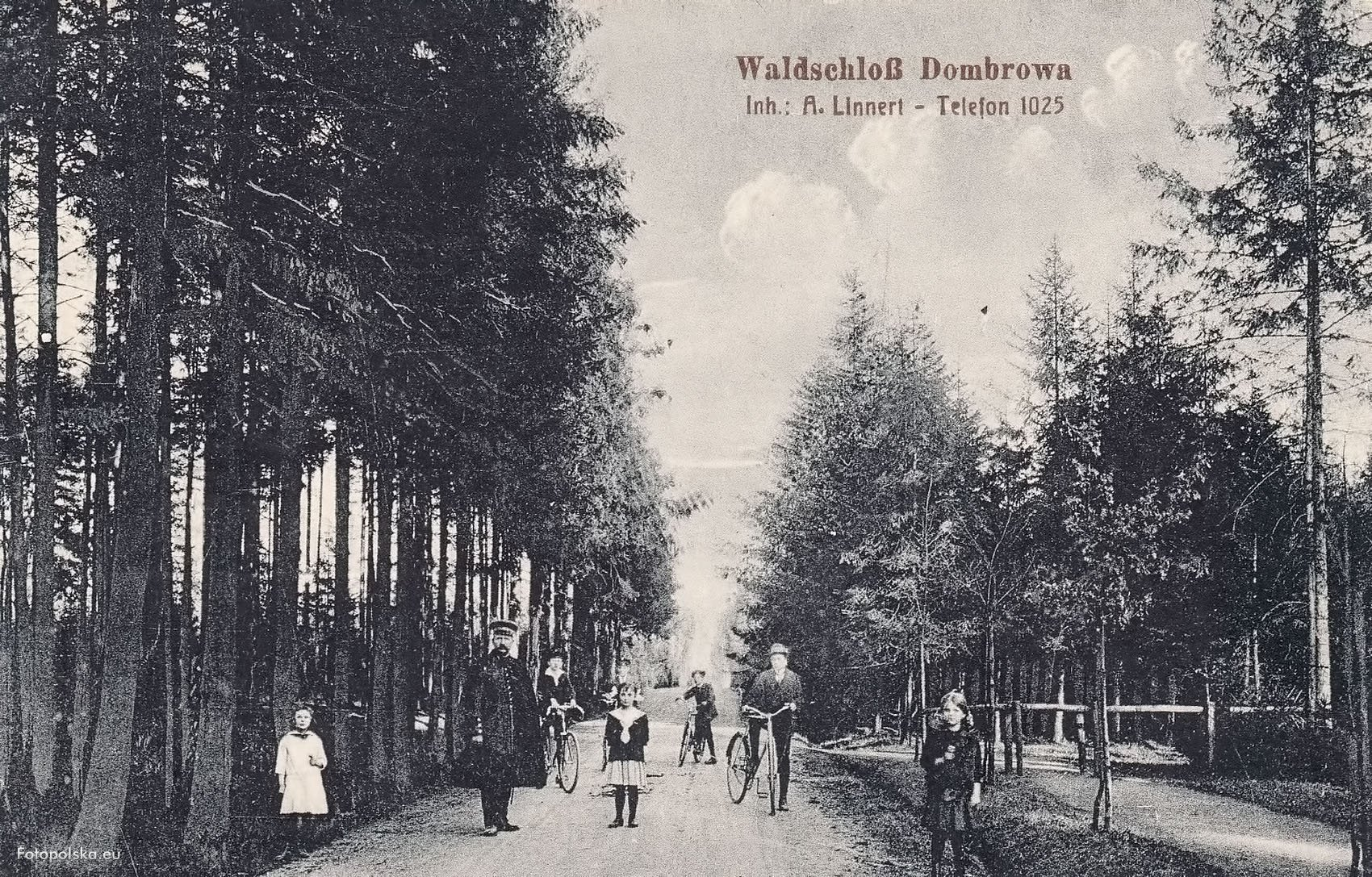
Waldpark around the Waldschloss, 1921
