= Seal Harbour, Nova Scotia =

Community in Nova Scotia, Canada

Coordinates: 45°9′5.97″N 61°35′1.9″W

Seal Harbour in Nova Scotia

Seal Harbour is a community in the Canadian province of Nova Scotia, located in Guysborough County. Located on the east side of Isaac's Harbour, it was named for the abundance of seals once found there. Founded as a fishing settlement, it became a gold mining community with the initial discovery in the area in 1867, with further discoveries in 1892. Gold mining near Seal Harbour peaked in 1904–1907. The mines briefly reopened from 1939 to 1942 and then closed, leaving fishing and lumbering as the main industries. Some gold exploration is still carried out in the area by the Orex Exploration company.

The harbour faces the nearby Country Island, the location of several shipwrecks, most notably the pirate ship Saladin, a British barque with a cargo of silver which ran aground and sank on Country Island after it was seized in a bloody mutiny in 1844.
