= Queenston Mining =

Gold deposit development

Queenston Mining, Inc. was a Canadian resource company focused on the exploration and development of gold deposits on “Proven Mine Trends” in geopolitically stable areas. The objectives of the Company were to expand upon its exploration areas to enlarge existing deposits and to target new discoveries, and to return to producer status through the development of its 100% owned properties.

Queenston Mining was purchased in 2012 by Osisko Mining

Queenston's company headquarters was located in Toronto, Ontario, and its two main properties were located in the Kirkland Lake Gold Camp, Ontario, and the Cadillac Gold Camp, Quebec.

== Projects ==
- Kirkland Lake
  - Upper Beaver Property
  - McBean-Anoki Property
  - Upper Canada Property
  - Lebel Property
  - Amalgamated Kirkland ("AK") Property
  - Joint Ventures
- Cadillac
  - Pandora Property
  - Wood Pandora Property
- Other Properties
  - Westhawk Property, Manitoba
  - Mishibishu Property, Ontario

=== Kirkland Lake ===
Kirkland Lake is one of the most well known historic gold camps in North America. This mining and lumbering community is located just a 6-hour drive from Toronto (about 580 km North). Gold was first discovered in 1906, in Swastika and Larder Lake but the first gold in the camp was produced at the Swastika mine in 1910. Production was continuous for 90 years, until 2000 when the Macassa Mine was closed. In 2002, Kirkland Lake Gold Inc. re-opened the Macassa Mine where they are currently producing gold. Some mines in the Kirkland Lake area have produced continuously for over 50 years and to date the region has produced more than 40 million ounces of gold. The camp ranks second in Canada, next only to Timmins with respect to total ounces of gold produced.

Queenston's main focus was an assemblage of gold properties in the historic Kirkland Lake gold camp, where it was undergoing a resurgence as a result of new discoveries made by Queenston and Kirkland Lake Gold Inc. Queenston's holdings included over 35 properties or over 230 km^{2}. The primary area of focus was in Gauthier Township where the company was advancing five of its 100% owned gold properties (Upper Beaver, McBean, Anoki, Bidgood and Upper Canada) towards production. The goal was to outline enough of a mineral resource of gold to feed a central milling facility to be constructed in Gauthier Township. In addition to the production preparation scenario, in 2012 exploration continued to be a prime focus of the Company.

=== Cadillac ===
The Cadillac mining camp currently ranks as the top gold-producing region in Quebec. The first gold discovery was in 1924 on the O’Brien property which entered into production in 1932. Between 1936-1949 several other mines were brought into production including Pandora, Central Cadillac and Wood Cadillac. The camp did not produce again until 1979 when the Bousquet and Doyon mines started up. The subsequent start up at LaRonde, Bousquet 2 and Mouska marked the second mining era in the camp. Currently the camp has four producers in the Mouska, Doyon, Lapa and LaRonde.

Queenston maintained two past producing gold properties along the Cadillac Break adjacent to the LaRonde and Lapa gold mines operated by Agnico Eagle mines. The Wood-Pandora property was a 50-50 joint venture with Globex Mining and the Pandora was 100% owned. In 2012 the joint venture continued drilling to further evaluate the economic potential of the Ironwood deposit.
