= Saladin (barque) =

19th-century British barque

History

United Kingdom
- Route: Valparaiso, Chile to London, England
- Builder: A & R Hopper & Co, North Shore, Newcastle
- Launched: 1835
- Fate: Loss, stranded at Saladin Point, on Harbour Island, near Country Harbour, Nova Scotia 21 May 1844.
- Notes: Cargo: Guano, silver, copper

General characteristics
- Class & type: Barque
- Tonnage: 550 tons
- Propulsion: Sail
- Crew: 14

The Saladin was a British barque that made voyages between Britain and the coast of Peru, carrying shipments of guano. The ship is best known for its demise in an act of mutiny, murder and piracy which began with the murder of its captain and officers and ended with the ship being stranded off the coast of Nova Scotia on 21 May 1844, followed by the last major piracy trial in British North America.

== Voyage ==
Saladin sailed from Valparaiso on 8 February 1844, carrying a shipment of guano, 70 tons of copper, 13 bars of silver, and about $9000 of gold and silver coins. The ship's crew consisted of Captain Alexander MacKenzie, First Mate Thomas F. Bryerly, Second Mate and carpenter George Jones, John Hazelton, William Trevaskiss (also known as Johnston), Charles Gustavus Anderson, William Carr, John Galloway, and three seamen, James Allen, Thomas Moffat and Sam Collins. The ship was also carrying two passengers, a Captain George Fielding and his son, also named George.

Saladin never made it to England, where its shipment was expected, instead it was found stranded on 21 May 1844 near Country Harbour, Nova Scotia on the shores of Harbour Island beside the village of Seal Harbour. Captain William Cunningham of the schooner Billow boarded the ship to assist the stranded crew. The six remaining members of Saladin's crew told Captain Cunningham that their captain had died 7 to 8 weeks earlier, the officers shortly after, and the other crew members had drowned. The implausible story and the large amount of money and silver made Cunningham suspicious. He alerted the authorities and the six men were arrested and taken to Halifax to be tried for piracy and murder. The money, the silver and some of the copper was recovered before the ship broke up and sank.

According to the statements given by the remaining men at their trials, the Saladin was taken over by George Fielding, after Fielding discovered the Saladin was carrying silver bars and coins. Fielding had convinced crew members Johnston, Anderson, and Hazelton to mutiny and help murder the captain, the officers and the rest of the crew, secretly convincing them of the riches aboard and "what a fine prize a pirate would make of them". The Captain, First and Second Mate and several crew members were struck and killed and then thrown overboard as the ship crossed the equator on 14 April 1844. The mutineers swore piratical oaths of loyalty and secrecy on the ship's bible. However, after searching for the hidden silver, Fielding tried to convince a few of the ringleaders and other members to help kill remainder of the crew. Upon realizing Fielding's true intentions, the remaining crew threw Fielding and his son overboard. The remaining men intended to sail for the Gulf of Saint Lawrence, where they would divide the cargo, but the ship ran aground at Country Harbour.

=== Trial ===
The men were first charged with piracy. The charges were later changed to murder. Anderson, Trevaskiss, Hazelton and Jones were found guilty and sentenced to death by hanging. They were executed on 30 July 1844. The cook, William Carr, and the Steward, John Galloway, convinced the court that they were forced to join the mutiny and were found not guilty. Carr settled in Digby County, and Galloway disappeared and was never heard from again.
