= Goldenville Group =

- Stratigraphic range: Terreneuvian–Miaolingian
- Type: Geological formation
- Thickness: up to 5,400 metres (18,000 ft)

Lithology
- Primary: Greywacke, Arenite, Slate

Location
- Region: Nova Scotia
- Country: Canada

The Goldenville Group is a geological group in Nova Scotia, Canada. It consists of metamorphosed Cambrian sedimentary rocks and contains the Church Point and High Head formations.
