= Osisko Lake =

Lake in Quebec, Canada

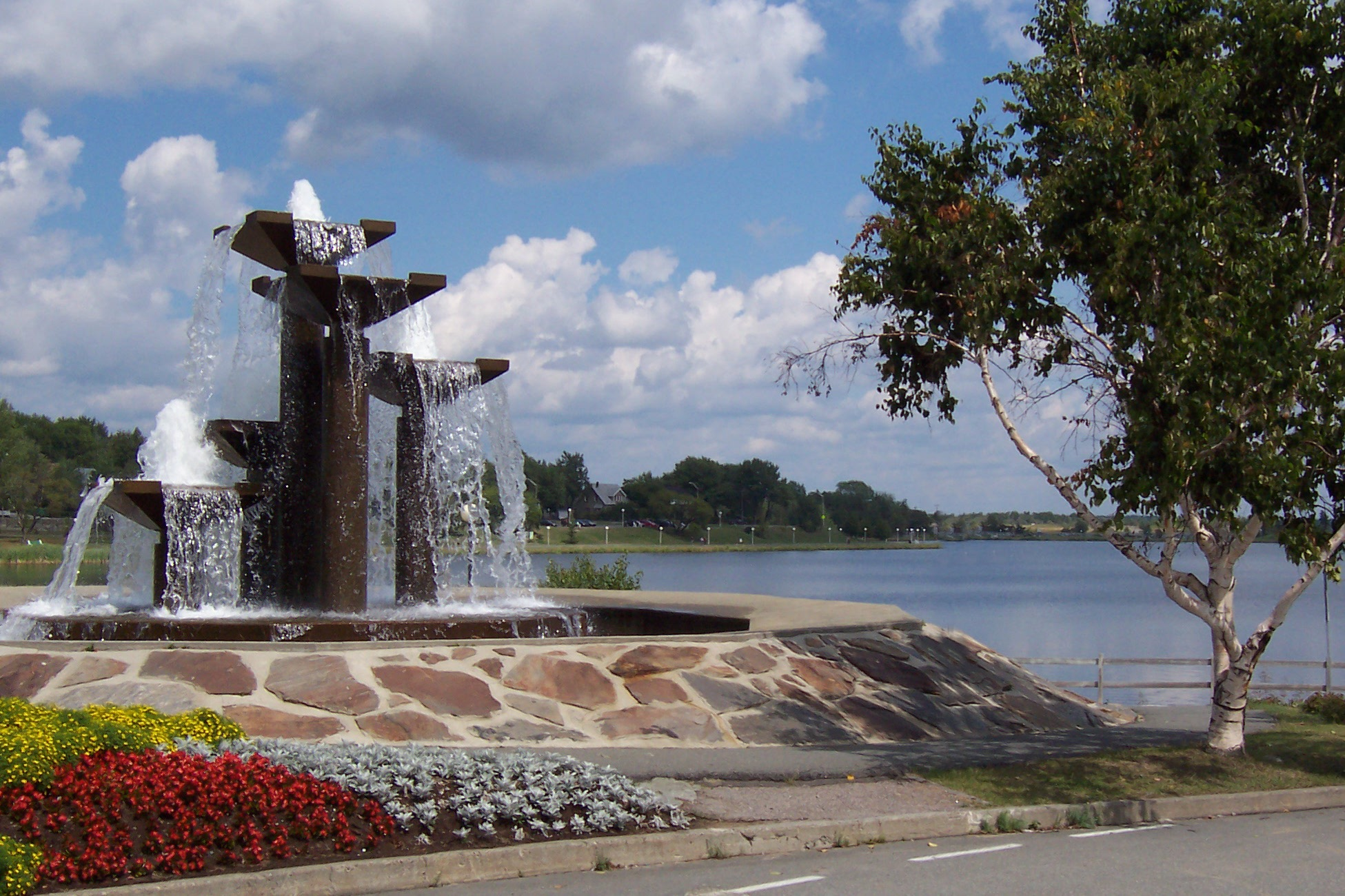
- Osisko Lake and fountain in Rouyn-Noranda

- Location within Quebec
- Location: Rouyn-Noranda, Quebec
- Coordinates: 48°15′00″N 78°59′39″W
- Basin countries: Canada
- Max. length: 3 km (1.9 mi)
- Max. width: 3 km (1.9 mi)
- Settlements: Rouyn-Noranda

Osisko Lake (officially Lac Osisko) is a lake in Rouyn-Noranda, Quebec, Canada. It is 3 km (1.9 mi) long and 3 km (1.9 mi) wide. The downtown of Rouyn-Noranda is situated on its western shore. The lake is a recreational area, surrounded by trails and a bike path. The city hospital is also located on the lake's shore. The lake has been a polluted lake for decades since it has been contaminated by tailings from Noranda Mines.

== Etymology ==
Osisko comes from Algonquin and means "muskrat".
