= Malartic, Quebec =

Malartic
- City
- Malarctic in 2026, with the Canadian Malartic open-pit gold mine in the background
- Motto(s): Ma ville, ma famille, ma fierté ("My town, my family, my pride")
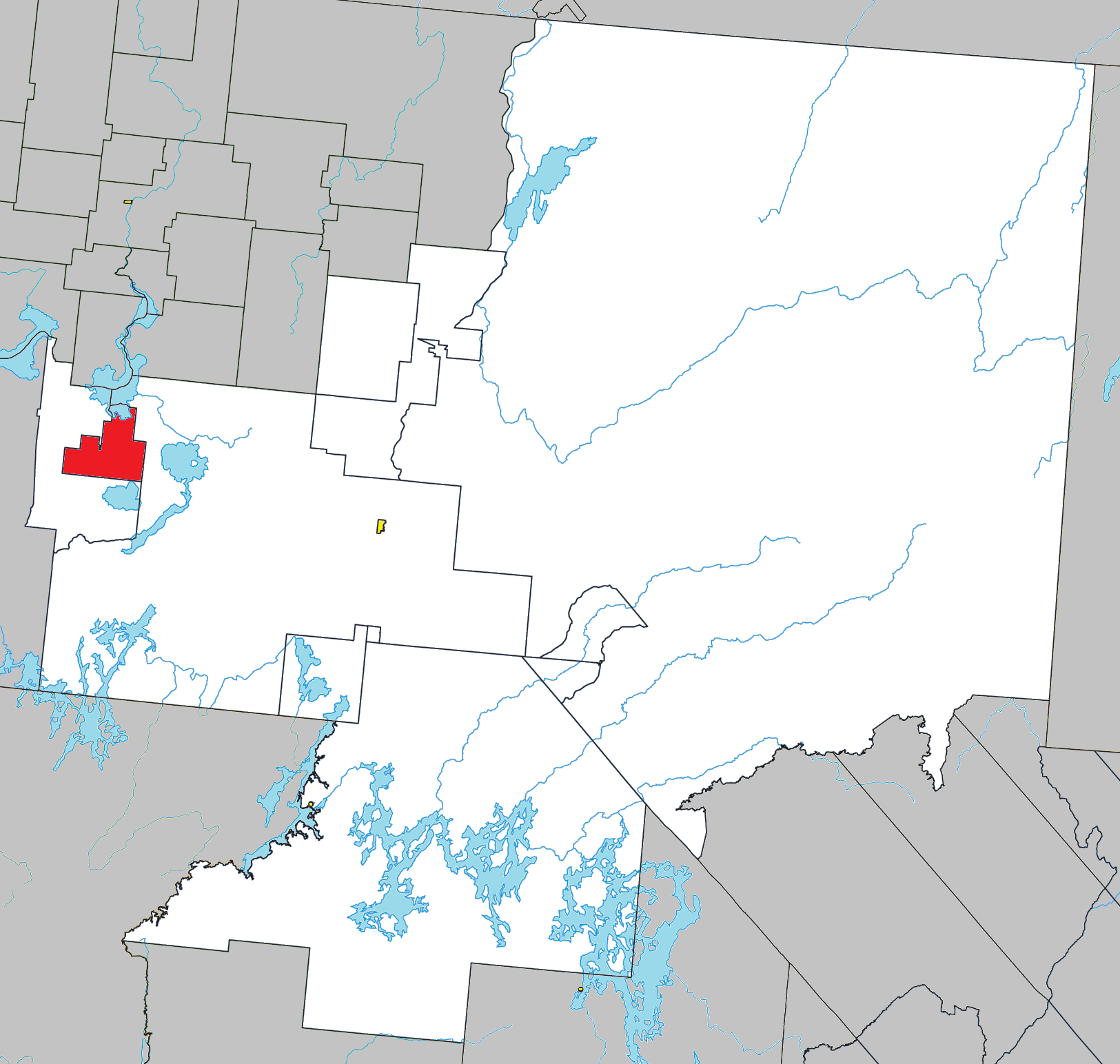
- Location within La Vallée-de-l'Or RCM

- Location in western Quebec
- Coordinates: 48°08′N 78°08′W
- Country: Canada
- Province: Quebec
- Region: Abitibi-Témiscamingue
- RCM: La Vallée-de-l'Or
- Settled: 1928
- Constituted: April 28, 1939

Government
  - Mayor: Martin Ferron
  - Federal riding: Abitibi—Baie-James— Nunavik—Eeyou
  - Prov. riding: Abitibi-Est

Area
  - Total: 158.54 km^{2} (61.21 sq mi)
  - Land: 147.45 km^{2} (56.93 sq mi)

Population (2021)
  - Total: 3,355
  - Density: 22.8/km^{2} (59/sq mi)
  - Pop (2016-21): ▼0.7%
  - Dwellings: 1,635
- Time zone: UTC−5 (EST)
  - Summer (DST): UTC−4 (EDT)
- Postal code(s): J0Y 1Z0
- Area code: 819
- Highways: R-117 (TCH)
- Website: ville.malartic.qc.ca

Malartic (French pronunciation: [malaʁtik]) is a town on the Malartic River in northwestern Quebec, Canada, in the La Vallée-de-l'Or Regional County Municipality. It is located about 80 kilometres (50 mi) east of the centre of Rouyn-Noranda along Quebec Route 117 and the Canadian National Railway.

In addition to the main population centre of Malartic, the municipality also includes the smaller settlement of Norrie (48°7′44″N 78°4′51″W).

== History ==
At the time when the Abitibi region was being surveyed and organized in 1907, the name Malartic was chosen for the geographic township and lake, following the pattern of assigning names of regiments and officers of General Montcalm's army. It was named after Anne Joseph Hippolyte de Maurès, Comte de Malartic, aide de camp to Montcalm.

The discovery of major gold deposits in 1923 led to a gold rush in the Abitibi region, attracting settlers (exclusively men during the first six years) to the area in 1928. In 1935, the Canadian Malartic Gold Mines began operation, employing people from all over the province, Canada, and several east European countries. Together with Eastern Malartic and Malartic Goldfields that began operating in 1937 and 1939 respectively, these three became Quebec's largest gold mines. But newly arriving workers were not permitted to settle near the mines and would build a squatter camp on Crown land about 4 km (2 1/2 miles) north of Malartic, that became the community of Roc d'Or. The two settlements grew concurrently, duplicating services. But the parishes (Saint-Martin-de-Tours in 1928), railway station, and post office (1936) were established near the mines in Malartic.

In 1939, the Town of Malartic was incorporated under the auspices of the Quebec Ministry of Mines, in an attempt to halt the proliferation of squatter camps in the Abitibi region. In 1943, the entire community of Roc d'Or was ordered to move to Malartic by the provincial government and the settlement was demolished. Despite a mining accident in April 1947 that killed 12 miners in an underground fire, Malartic was thriving throughout the 1950s, reaching a peak of nearly 7000 residents.

But in 1965, Canadian Malartic and Malartic Goldfields closed their mines, followed by the Barnat and East Malartic mines in the 1980s. This led to rapid decline in the economy and population.

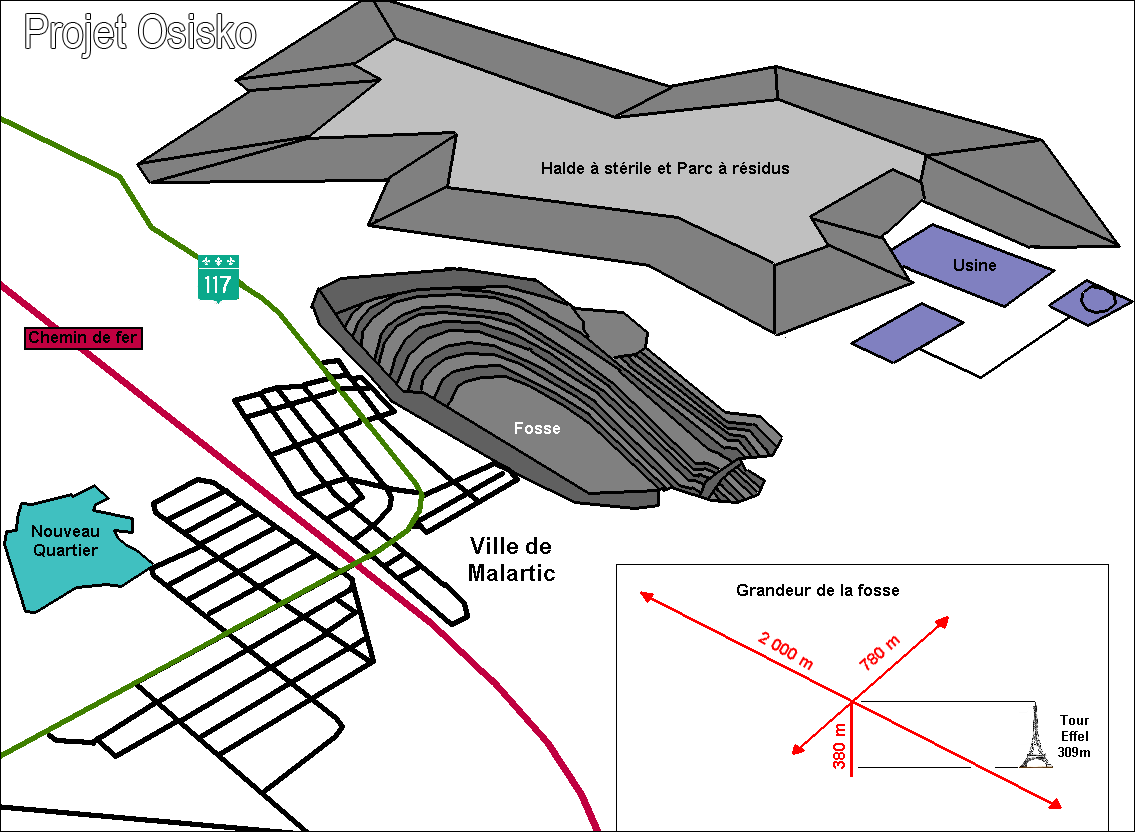
Plan of the new open-pit mine directly south of the town centre.

In 2008 and 2009, renewed exploration by Osisko Mining revealed an untapped new gold deposit, estimated at 9 million ounces, beneath the town. The Canadian Malartic Corporation received approval from the government of Quebec to launch what would become Canada's largest ever open pit gold mine. The project, with an estimated cost of $1 billion, involved relocating most of the portion of the town lying south of Route 117, consisting of about 200 houses and several of the town's public facilities, to a new housing development in the north end of town. This move was featured in season 4 of the television show Monster Moves. As of late 2009, most of the relocation work had been completed, and this, before the end of public consultations by Quebec's Ministry of Sustainable Development, Environment and Parks.

In May 2011, the open pit mine began commercial production. In June 2014, it was bought from Osisko by a partnership of Agnico Eagle and Yamana Gold. By 2023, the mine had produced a total of seven million ounces (200,000 kg) of gold.

Documentary filmmaker Nicolas Paquet profiled the effects of the mining development on the town in two documentary films, The Golden Rule (La Règle d'or) in 2011 and Malartic in 2024.

== Demographics ==
In the 2021 Census of Population conducted by Statistics Canada, Malartic had a population of 3,355 living in 1,481 of its 1,635 total private dwellings, a change of −0.7% from its 2016 population of 3,377. With a land area of 147.45 km^{2} (56.93 sq mi), it had a population density of 22.8/km^{2} (58.9/sq mi) in 2021.

Historical census populations – Malartic, Quebec

Year	Pop.	±%
1941	2,895	—
1951	5,983	+106.7%
1956	6,818	+14.0%
1961	6,998	+2.6%
1966	6,606	−5.6%
1971	5,347	−19.1%
1976	5,130	−4.1%
1981	4,833	−5.8%

Year	Pop.	±%
1986	4,474	−7.4%
1991	4,326	−3.3%
1996	4,154	−4.0%
2001	3,704	−10.8%
2006	3,640	−1.7%
2011	3,449	−5.2%
2016	3,377	−2.1%
2021	3,355	−0.7%

Source: Statistics Canada

Mother tongue (2021):

- English as first language: 2.8 %
- French as first language: 93.7 %
- English and French as first language: 0.6 %
- Other as first language: 2.5 %

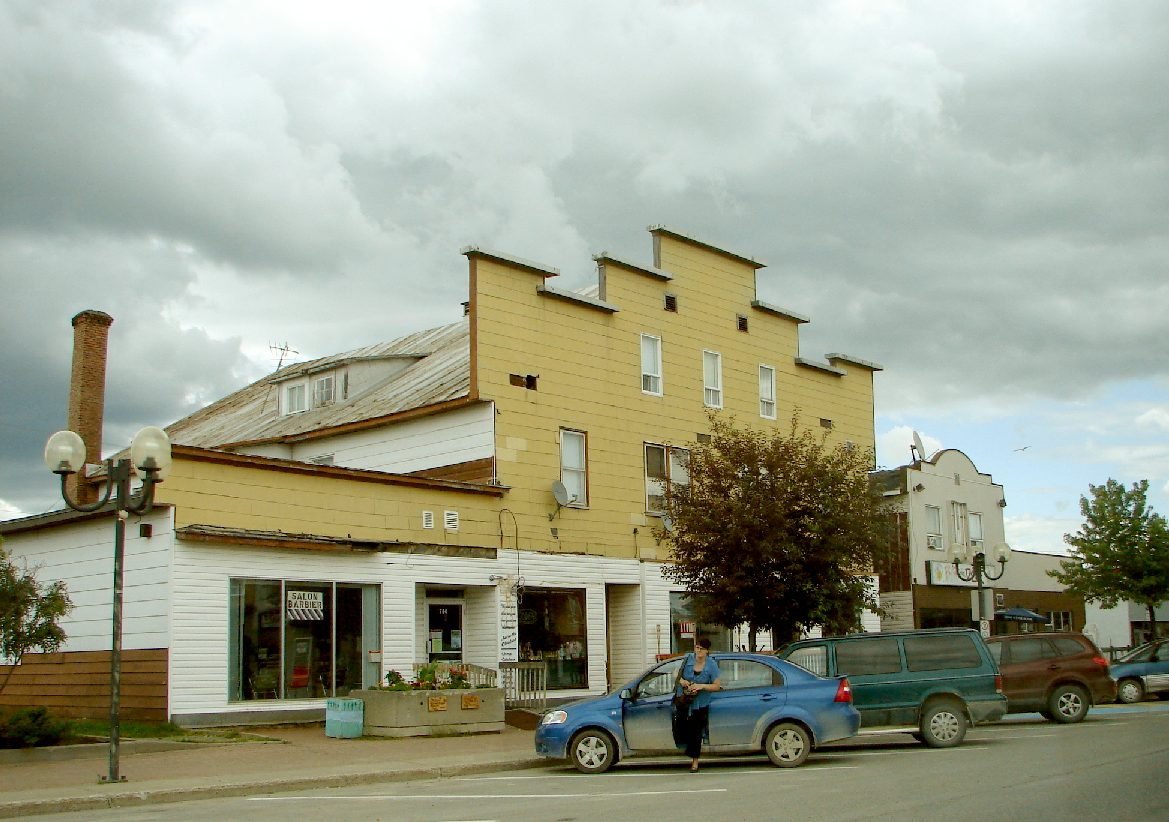
Malartic in 2009

== Government ==
As of 2023, the municipal government consists of mayor Martin Ferron and councillors Sylvie Daigle, Catherine Larivière, Jude Boucher, Alexy Vezeau, Daniel Magnan, and Jean Turgeon.

Federally, Malartic is located in the electoral district of Abitibi—Baie-James—Nunavik—Eeyou, currently represented in the House of Commons of Canada by Sylvie Bérubé of the Bloc Québécois. Provincially, it is in the district of Abitibi-Est, represented in the National Assembly of Quebec by Pierre Dufour of the Coalition Avenir Québec.

List of former mayors:

- Fernand Carpentier (...–2008)
- André Vezeau (2008–2013)
- Martin Ferron (2013–present)

== Notable people ==
- Yves Bergeron, ice hockey winger
- Michel Brière, ice hockey centre
- Marcel Côté, economist and politician
- Robbie King, organist
- Jim Watson, ice hockey defenseman

== Education ==
- École Des Explorateurs – Kindergarten to grade six
- École Secondaire Le Tremplin – secondary grades one to five
- Trait d'Union – adult education
