= List of historic places in Guysborough County, Nova Scotia =

Guysborough County is a historic county in the Canadian province of Nova Scotia. This list compiles historic places recognized by the Canadian Register of Historic Places within the county.

== List of historic places ==
Name	Address	Coordinates	Government recognition (CRHP №)	Wikidata ID	Image
16 Cameron Road	16 Cameron Road; Sherbrooke NS	45°08′34″N 61°59′12″W	Sherbrooke municipality (14741)	Q137259534	Upload Photo
Campbell & MacKeen Law Office	146 Main St. Guysborough NS	45°23′38″N 61°30′01″W	Guysborough municipality (14881)	Q137259558	Upload Photo
Canso Islands National Historic Site of Canada	School Street; Canso NS	45°20′48″N 60°58′15″W	Federal (14304)	Q23011164	More images
Christ Church Anglican	144 Church Street; Guysborough NS	45°23′21″N 61°29′56″W	Guysborough municipality (14932)	Q137259625	Upload Photo
Commercial Cable Building (Demolished 2017)	10 Front Street; Hazel Hill NS	45°19′42″N 61°01′40″W	Hazel Hill municipality (5744)	Q136528387	More images
Government of Canada Building	15 Main Street; Sherbrooke NS	45°08′31″N 61°59′00″W	Federal (10973)	Q134698944	More images
Grassy Island Fort National Historic Site of Canada	Canso NS	45°20′15″N 60°58′19″W	Federal (11666)	Q16931151	More images
Harbour House	163 Green Street; Guysborough NS	45°23′21″N 61°29′47″W	Nova Scotia (3407)	Q137259697	Upload Photo
Heritage Goldenville Society	199 Goldenville Road; Goldenville NS	45°07′27″N 62°00′32″W	Goldenville municipality (15156)	Q137259708	Upload Photo
Holy Trinity Anglican Church	16733 Route 316; Country Harbour Mines NS	45°15′47″N 61°50′54″W	Country Harbour Mines municipality (14935)	Q137259742	Upload Photo
Isaac's Harbour United Baptist Church	382 Isaac's Harbour Rd; Isaac's Harbour NS	45°10′49″N 61°39′38″W	Isaac's Harbour municipality (14841)	Q137259771	Upload Photo
Jost House	62 Main Street; Guysborough NS	45°23′28″N 61°29′52″W	Nova Scotia (13539)	Q137259804	Upload Photo
Jost's Wharf Building	Guysborough NS	45°23′30″N 61°29′53″W	Guysborough municipality (14897)	Q137259837	Upload Photo
Kirk Memorial United Church	1007 Glenelg Church Road; Aspen NS	45°16′51″N 62°04′36″W	Aspen municipality (15161)	Q137259869	Upload Photo
Light Tower	Country Island, off Seal Harbour; Guysborough County NS	45°05′59″N 61°32′32″W	Guysborough County municipality (2933)	Q137260077	Upload Photo
Queensport Lighthouse	Rook Island; Queensport NS	45°20′53″N 61°16′18″W	Federal (2922, (20773)	Q28375846	More images
Lighttower	Isaac's Harbour Road; Isaacs Harbour NS	45°09′52″N 61°39′17″W	Federal (4805)	Q28375795	More images
New Chester Community Club	New Chester Road; New Chester NS	45°01′29″N 62°12′37″W	New Chester municipality (15141)	Q137260088	Upload Photo
Old Guysborough Court House Museum	283 Church Street; Guysborough NS	45°23′21″N 61°29′55″W	Nova Scotia (3053)	Q136564543	More images
Laurel Rebekah Lodge	Goldboro NS	45°10′49″N 61°39′02″W	Goldboro municipality (14901)	Q137162750	Upload Photo
The Reynolds Property	5525 Hwy 16; Queensport NS	45°14′28″N 61°21′10″W	Queensport municipality (14930)	Q137260094	Upload Photo
St. Thomas Church	4029 South River Rd; Salmon River Lake NS	45°21′33″N 61°43′13″W	Salmon River Lake municipality (14934)	Q137260115	Upload Photo
St. Vincent de Paul Church	5475 Route 16; Queensport NS	45°20′24″N 61°16′10″W	Queensport municipality (14933)	Q137260167	More images
Stormont Masonic Lodge #96	530 Isaac's Harbour Rd; Isaac's Harbour NS	45°10′29″N 61°39′19″W	Isaac's Harbour municipality (14898)	Q137162739	Upload Photo
Stormont Union Church	15324 Route 316; Stormont NS	45°13′50″N 61°45′00″W	Stormont municipality (14936)	Q137260188	Upload Photo

== See also ==
- List of historic places in Nova Scotia
- List of National Historic Sites of Canada in Nova Scotia
- Heritage Property Act (Nova Scotia)
