= List of historic places in Cape Breton Regional Municipality =

Cape Breton Regional Municipality (CBRM) is the second largest municipality in the Canadian province of Nova Scotia, located on Cape Breton Island. This list compiles historic places recognized by the Canadian Register of Historic Places within the municipality.

== List of historic places ==
| Name | Address | Coordinates | Government recognition (CRHP №) | Wikidata ID | Image |
|---|---|---|---|---|---|
| Arts Building | 196 George Street; Sydney NS | 46°08′N 60°11′W | Federal (2886) | Q137290874 | Upload Photo |
| Bank of Montreal | 175 Charlotte Street; Sydney NS | 46°08′27″N 60°11′43″W | Sydney municipality (9325) | Q111940387 | More images |
| Richard Brown House | 32 Brown Street; Sydney Mines NS | 46°14′07″N 60°13′25″W | Nova Scotia (2988) | Q134313549 | Upload Photo |
| Chapel Point Battery Site | Church Street and Amber Drive; Sydney Mines NS | 46°14′39″N 60°12′41″W | Nova Scotia (6525) | Q110980686 | More images |
| 49 Charlotte Street | 49 Charlotte Street; Sydney NS | 46°08′38″N 60°11′56″W | Sydney municipality (13462) | Q137291209 | Upload Photo |
| 79 Charlotte Street | 79 Charlotte Street; Sydney NS | 46°08′36″N 60°11′54″W | Sydney municipality (5163) | Q137291273 | Upload Photo |
| CN Train Station | 159 Legatto Street; Sydney Mines NS | 46°14′41″N 60°14′02″W | Nova Scotia (7811) | Q134312362 | Upload Photo |
| Cossit House | 75 Charlotte Street; Sydney NS | 46°08′35″N 60°11′55″W | Nova Scotia (1453) | Q123381411 | More images |
| Dominion Schoolhouse | 6715 Seaside Drive; Dominion NS | 46°12′48″N 60°02′02″W | Dominion municipality (9324) | Q137291340 | Upload Photo |
| Fairholme Farm | Fairholme Farm, 439 Johnson Road; Georges River NS | 46°13′37″N 60°17′42″W | | Q27963317 | More images |
| Flint Island Lighthouse | Flint Island NS | 46°10′44″N 59°48′52″W | Federal (16107) | Q137291739 | Upload Photo |
| Fort Petrie | 3479 New Waterford Hwy; New Victoria NS | 46°14′59″N 60°09′15″W | Nova Scotia (2999), New Victoria municipality (9310) | Q136799614 | More images |
| Fortress of Louisbourg National Historic Site of Canada | Louisbourg NS | 45°53′33″N 59°59′10″W | Federal (4212) | Q540062 | More images |
| Gabarus Light Tower | Gabarus NS | 45°30′13″N 60°51′02″W | Federal (16106) | Q32518995 | More images |
| Glace Bay Universal Negro Improvement Association | 35 Jessome Street; Glace Bay NS | 46°12′16″N 59°57′31″W | Glace Bay municipality (9179) | Q137291357 | Upload Photo |
| St. Andrew's United Church | 40 Bentinck Street; Sydney NS | 46°08′19″N 60°11′38″W | Sydney municipality (9326) | Q24191564 | More images |
| Holy Ghost Ukrainian Church | 49 West Street; Whitney Pier NS | 46°09′28″N 60°10′52″W | Nova Scotia (6293) | Q111937824 | More images |
| Jost House | 54 Charlotte Street; Sydney NS | 46°08′37″N 60°11′55″W | Nova Scotia (6528), Sydney municipality (5171) | Q110980811 | More images |
| Kennedy House | 89 Esplanade Street; Sydney NS | 46°08′34″N 60°11′55″W | Nova Scotia (7964) | Q137291390 | Upload Photo |
| Lakeview House | 7271 East Bay Highway; Big Pond NS | 45°54′36″N 60°32′07″W | Big Pond municipality (5197) | Q137291406 | Upload Photo |
| Louisbourg Navy League Building | 7563 Main Street; Louisbourg NS | 45°55′08″N 59°58′30″W | Nova Scotia (8041) | Q137291413 | Upload Photo |
| Light Tower (Low Point Lighthouse) | 39 Lighthouse Road, Low Point Lightstation; New Victoria NS | 46°16′02″N 60°07′33″W | Federal (13966) | Q14175741 | More images |
| Lyceum | 225 George Street; Sydney NS | 46°08′32″N 60°11′37″W | Nova Scotia (7593) | Q113558460 | More images |
| Marconi National Historic Site of Canada | Timmerman and Vivian Streets; Glace Bay NS | 46°12′40″N 59°57′09″W | Federal (11710) | Q3329267 | More images |
| Marconi Wireless Station National Historic Site of Canada | Marconi Towers Road; Glace Bay NS | 46°09′17″N 59°56′45″W | Federal (9370) | Q3329267 | More images |
| Mitchell Island Union Church | 2645 Point Edward Highway; Point Edward NS | 46°09′53″N 60°16′22″W | Point Edward municipality (9311) | Q136491114 | More images |
| Museum and Caretaker's House | Fortress Louisbourg; Louisbourg, Nova Scotia NS | 45°53′N 60°03′W | Federal (3158) | Q137291692 | More images |
| Old Glace Bay Town Hall | 14 McKeen Street; Glace Bay NS | 46°11′51″N 59°57′29″W | Glace Bay municipality (5191) | Q5566087 | More images |
| Old Grand Narrows Hotel B&B | 11 Derby Point Road; Grand Narrows NS | 45°57′19″N 60°47′36″W | Grand Narrows municipality (5196) | Q137291438 | Upload Photo |
| Old Sydney Mines Post Office | 2 Fraser Avenue; Sydney Mines NS | 46°14′31″N 60°13′54″W | Nova Scotia (6283) | Q136481464 | More images |
| Peters House | 16 Campbell Street; Sydney NS | 46°08′42″N 60°11′57″W | Sydney municipality (5189) | Q137162727 | Upload Photo |
| Port Morien Rectory Bed and Breakfast | 2652 Morien Highway; Port Morien NS | 46°08′12″N 59°52′15″W | Port Morien municipality (8965) | Q137291483 | Upload Photo |
| Royal Battery National Historic Site of Canada | Fortress Louisbourg; Louisbourg NS | 45°54′33″N 59°58′48″W | Federal (13393) | Q22984561 | More images |
| St. George's Church and Graveyard | 119 Charlotte Street; Sydney NS | 46°08′33″N 60°11′47″W | Nova Scotia (5378) | Q111913952 | More images |
| St. Mary's Polish Church | 15 Wesley Street; Whitney Pier NS | 46°09′29″N 60°11′04″W | Nova Scotia (6285) | Q111915165 | Upload Photo |
| St. Patrick's Church | 87 Esplanade; Sydney NS | 46°08′34″N 60°11′55″W | Nova Scotia (3295) | Q111913642 | More images |
| St. Philip's African Orthodox Church | 34 Hankard Street; Whitney Pier NS | 46°09′11″N 60°10′48″W | Nova Scotia (6292) | Q111913246 | Upload Photo |
| Science Building | 210 George Street; Sydney NS | 46°08′N 60°11′W | Federal (2899) | Q137291517 | Upload Photo |
| Sydney and Louisburg Railway Station | 7330 Main Street; Louisbourg NS | 45°55′26″N 59°57′49″W | Nova Scotia (7813) | Q3096908 | More images |
| Tower (Louisbourg Lighthouse) | Havenside Road; Louisbourg NS | 45°54′22″N 59°57′31″W | Federal (9654) | Q6688576 | More images |
| Union Presbyterian Church | 4220 Louisbourg Highway; Albert Bridge NS | 46°01′11″N 60°03′30″W | Albert Bridge municipality (15983) | Q137291557 | More images |
| Wolfe's Landing National Historic Site of Canada | Kennington Cove, Fortress Louisbourg; Louisbourg NS | 45°52′42″N 60°03′31″W | Federal (13556) | Q22984569 | Upload Photo |

== See also ==
- List of historic places in Nova Scotia
- List of National Historic Sites of Canada in Nova Scotia
- Heritage Property Act (Nova Scotia)
