= List of historic places in Lunenburg County, Nova Scotia =

Lunenburg County is a historical county and census division on the South Shore of the Canadian province of Nova Scotia. This list compiles historic places recognized by the Canadian Register of Historic Places within the county.

== List of historic places ==
Name	Address	Coordinates	Government recognition (CRHP №)	Wikidata ID	Image
17 Aberdeen Street	17 Aberdeen Street; Mahone Bay NS	44°26′59″N 64°23′01″W	Mahone Bay municipality (16272)	Q137369044	Upload Photo
All Saints Anglican Church	4122 Highway 329; Bayswater NS	44°29′55″N 64°04′09″W	Bayswater municipality (7008)	Q137369068	Upload Photo
Anglican Rectory	4898 Highway 329; Blandford NS	44°29′38″N 64°06′34″W	Blandford municipality (9183)	Q137369092	Upload Photo
Ashlea House	42 Falkland Street; Lunenburg NS	44°22′39″N 64°19′07″W	Lunenburg municipality (2065)		
Backman Homestead	5219 Highway 3 Chester Basin NS	44°34′09″N 64°18′03″W	Chester Basin municipality (15302)	Q137369110	Upload Photo
Bailly House	134 Pelham Street; Lunenburg NS	44°22′36″N 64°18′32″W	Lunenburg municipality (1533)	Q102232063	More images
Bayview Cemetery	Edgewater Street, corner of Clearland; Mahone Bay NS	44°27′12″N 64°22′52″W	Mahone Bay municipality (12008)	Q136491139	More images
Captain William Boehner House	36 Dufferin Street; Lunenburg NS	44°22′45″N 64°19′05″W	Lunenburg municipality (1799)	Q136497072	More images
Boscawen Inn	150 Cumberland Street; Lunenburg NS	44°22′20″N 64°18′32″W	Lunenburg municipality (12624)	Q137369126	Upload Photo
Central United Church	136 Cumberland Street; Lunenburg NS	44°22′39″N 64°18′32″W	Lunenburg municipality (2066)	Q131451091	More images
Chester Train Station	20 Smith Road; Chester NS	44°32′50″N 64°14′43″W	Chester municipality (7327)	Q137369160	Upload Photo
Chester United Baptist Church	84 King Street; Chester NS	44°32′25″N 64°14′29″W	Chester municipality (9188)	Q137369198	Upload Photo
Christ Anglican Church	4 Forties Road; New Ross NS	44°44′13″N 64°27′25″W	New Ross municipality (10576)	Q137787098	Upload Photo
Christ Anglican Church Rectory	10 Forties Road; New Ross NS	44°44′12″N 64°27′34″W	New Ross municipality (10498)	Q137787106	Upload Photo
Corkum-Bezanson Home	209 Middle River Road; Chester Basin NS	44°34′27″N 64°16′53″W	Chester Basin municipality (9189)	Q137787162	Upload Photo
49 Cornwallis Street	49 Cornwallis Street; Lunenburg NS	44°22′43″N 64°18′44″W	Lunenburg municipality (1609)	Q136493447	More images
Countway Home	12 Lower Grant Road; Chester Basin NS	44°34′03″N 64°17′28″W	Chester Basin municipality (15387)	Q137787166	Upload Photo
Countway Mosher Home	4956 Highway 3 Middle River NS	44°33′55″N 64°17′07″W	Middle River municipality (9086)	Q137787175	Upload Photo
56 Dufferin Street	56 Dufferin Street; Lunenburg NS	44°22′47″N 64°19′07″W	Lunenburg municipality (2005)	Q136492500	More images
60 Dufferin Street	60 Dufferin Street; Lunenburg NS	44°22′47″N 64°19′07″W	Lunenburg municipality (1809)	Q136498704	More images
East Ironbound Combined Lighthouse and Dwelling	East Ironbound Island; Chester area NS	44°26′22″N 64°05′00″W	Federal (13073)	Q137787251	Upload Photo
77 Edgewater Street	77 Edgewater Street; Mahone Bay NS	44°27′03″N 64°22′48″W	Mahone Bay municipality (11801)	Q136491253	More images
97 Edgewater Street	97 Edgewater Street; Mahone Bay NS	44°27′05″N 64°22′50″W	Mahone Bay municipality (12581)	Q136491210	More images
121 Edgewater Street	121 Edgewater Street; Mahone Bay NS	44°27′09″N 64°22′52″W	Mahone Bay municipality (11852)	Q136491243	More images
Calvin Eisnor Home	92 Clayton Eisnor Road; Chester Basin NS	44°33′56″N 64°18′01″W	Chester Basin municipality (8955)	Q137787260	Upload Photo
John Henry Ernst House	222 Langille Settlement Road; Blockhouse NS	44°26′56″N 64°25′56″W	Nova Scotia (3466)	Q137162420	More images
Eisenhauer House	430 Borgels Point Road; Chester Basin NS	44°32′59″N 64°18′15″W	Nova Scotia (6656)	Q137787265	Upload Photo
James D. Eisenhauer House	18 Falkland Street; Lunenburg NS	44°22′42″N 64°19′04″W	Lunenburg municipality (2767)	Q136498724	More images
The Fairview Inn	25 Queen Street; Bridgewater NS	44°22′34″N 64°31′11″W	Bridgewater municipality (11972)	Q137787274	Upload Photo
Fort Sainte Marie de Grace National Historic Site of Canada	LaHave NS	44°17′18″N 64°21′05″W	Federal (13572)	Q3078067	More images
Geldert House	205 York Street; Lunenburg NS	44°22′44″N 64°18′20″W	Lunenburg municipality (1635)	Q137787283	Upload Photo
William Godley House	205 Cumberland Street; Lunenburg NS	44°22′39″N 64°18′21″W	Lunenburg municipality (2060)	Q102260728	More images
Gorman House	42 Pleasant Street; Chester NS	44°32′18″N 64°14′32″W	Chester municipality (9190)	Q137787304	Upload Photo
Rafuse Hennigar Home	743 Chester Grant Road; Chester Basin NS	44°36′50″N 64°19′08″W	Chester Basin municipality (11495)	Q137787311	Upload Photo
Lewis A. Hirtle Photography Shop	183 Lincoln Street; Lunenburg NS	44°22′39″N 64°18′43″W	Lunenburg municipality (1670)	Q137787321	Upload Photo
Robert Herman House	201 York Street; Lunenburg NS	44°22′44″N 64°18′21″W	Lunenburg municipality (2694)	Q137787327	Upload Photo
Samuel Herman House	56 Broad Street; Lunenburg NS	44°22′45″N 64°19′12″W	Lunenburg municipality (1653)	Q111365537	More images
James Holland House	230 Pelham Street; Lunenburg NS	44°22′34″N 64°18′15″W	Lunenburg municipality (2693)	Q137787357	Upload Photo
Holy Trinity Anglican Church	68 Alexandra Avenue; Bridgewater NS	44°22′21″N 64°30′57″W	Bridgewater municipality (11932)	Q137795919	Upload Photo
James Hunt House	331 Lincoln Street; Lunenburg NS	44°22′38″N 64°18′27″W	Lunenburg municipality (2687)	Q137796018	Upload Photo
Jost House	77 Fox Street; Lunenburg NS	44°22′44″N 64°18′41″W	Lunenburg municipality (1640)	Q136498801	More images
Kaulbach House	75 Pelham Street; Lunenburg NS	44°22′37″N 64°18′41″W	Lunenburg municipality (1414)	Q136498997	More images
Alexander Kedy House	237-249 Edgewater Street; Mahone Bay NS	44°27′21″N 64°22′44″W	Nova Scotia (16205)	Q136819414	More images
Knaut-Rhuland House National Historic Site of Canada	125 Pelham Street; Lunenburg NS	44°22′36″N 64°18′33″W	Federal (8077), Nova Scotia (6488), Lunenburg municipality (1786)	Q6421816	More images
LaHave Islands Marine Museum	100 LaHave Islands Road; LaHave Island NS	44°13′58″N 64°22′13″W	LaHave Island municipality (5748)	Q136800473	More images
Lavers House	192 Central Street; Chester NS	44°32′39″N 64°14′33″W	Chester municipality (11145)	Q137796067	Upload Photo
Larder Home	4541 Highway 12; New Ross NS	44°43′26″N 64°27′22″W	New Ross municipality (15303)	Q137796075	Upload Photo
Lennox House	78 Fox Street; Lunenburg NS	44°22′44″N 64°18′41″W	Lunenburg municipality (1654)	Q136498787	More images
Lennox Tavern	69 Fox Street; Lunenburg NS	44°22′44″N 64°18′42″W	Nova Scotia (3529), Lunenburg municipality (1299)	Q136491179	More images
112-118 Lincoln Street	112-118 Lincoln Street; Lunenburg NS	44°22′40″N 64°18′50″W	Lunenburg municipality (1667)	Q102232247	More images
Lordly House	133 Central Street; Chester NS	44°19′21″N 64°08′35″W	Chester municipality (7237)	Q117745852	More images
Lunenburg Academy National Historic Site of Canada	101 Kaulback Street; Lunenburg NS	44°22′09″N 64°17′48″W	Federal (13179), Nova Scotia (6483), Lunenburg municipality (1517)	Q2364154	More images
Lunenburg Inn	26 Dufferin Street; Lunenburg NS	44°22′44″N 64°19′04″W	Lunenburg municipality (2033)	Q136498709	More images
Lunenburg Old Town Heritage Conservation District	Old Town; Lunenburg NS	44°22′41″N 64°18′35″W	Lunenburg municipality (2253)		More images
Lunenburg Town Hall	119 Cumberland Street; Lunenburg NS	44°22′41″N 64°18′35″W	Lunenburg municipality (1611)	Q102341013	More images
MacIsaac House	19 Hospital Road; Garden Lots NS	44°22′25″N 64°17′56″W	Garden Lots municipality (5746)	Q137796090	Upload Photo
328 Main Street	328 Main Street; Mahone Bay NS	44°27′03″N 64°23′25″W	Mahone Bay municipality (12035)	Q137796100	Upload Photo
578 Main Street	578 Main Street; Mahone Bay NS	44°26′56″N 64°22′44″W	Mahone Bay municipality (11861)	Q137796111	Upload Photo
674 Main Street	674 Main Street; Mahone Bay NS	44°26′50″N 64°22′31″W	Mahone Bay municipality (12066)	Q137170406	More images
680 Main Street	680 Main Street; Mahone Bay NS	44°26′49″N 64°22′30″W	Mahone Bay municipality (12096)	Q136491195	More images
Manuels Inn	17 Croft Road; Chester Basin NS	44°33′58″N 64°18′41″W	Chester Basin municipality (8500)	Q137796119	Upload Photo
Mayner House	185 Townsend Street; Lunenburg NS	44°22′41″N 64°18′24″W	Lunenburg municipality (1575)	Q102232141	More images
McKittrick House	48 Dufferin Street; Lunenburg NS	44°22′46″N 64°19′08″W	Lunenburg municipality (1789)	Q136494609	More images
McLachlan House	306 Lincoln Street; Lunenburg NS	44°22′37″N 64°18′31″W	Lunenburg municipality (12625)	Q136494122	More images
Lincoln Meister House	4865 Highway 12; New Ross NS	44°44′23″N 64°27′28″W	New Ross municipality (10704)	Q137796128	Upload Photo
Mizpah Cottage	75 Dufferin Street; Lunenburg NS	44°22′48″N 64°19′12″W	Lunenburg municipality (10837)	Q136491651	More images
207 Montague Street	207 Montague Street; Lunenburg NS	44°22′35″N 64°18′24″W	Lunenburg municipality (1655)	Q137800724	Upload Photo
Morash Emporium	55 Montague Street; Lunenburg NS	44°22′37″N 64°18′44″W	Lunenburg municipality (2022)	Q137800739	Upload Photo
Allan R. Morash House	43 York Street; Lunenburg NS	44°22′47″N 64°18′46″W	Lunenburg municipality (2068)	Q111337710	More images
Naas House	8 Tannery Road; Lunenburg NS	44°22′33″N 64°19′12″W	Lunenburg municipality (2057)	Q137800752	Upload Photo
David Nauss House	255 Haddon Hill Road; Chester NS	44°33′22″N 64°15′12″W	Chester municipality (8926)	Q137800760	Upload Photo
Henry Neil Property	242 Lincoln Street; Lunenburg NS	44°22′38″N 64°18′37″W	Lunenburg municipality (1798)	Q102232449	More images
Northwest United Baptist Church	1609 Big Lots Road; Fauxburg NS	44°24′49″N 64°22′03″W	Nova Scotia (6567)	Q136491222	More images
Old Methodist Church	14 Main Street; Chester NS	44°32′42″N 64°14′21″W	Chester municipality (7236)	Q137800771	Upload Photo
Old New Town School	17 Tannery Road; Lunenburg NS	44°22′33″N 64°19′08″W	Lunenburg municipality (2688)	Q136498747	More images
Old Town Lunenburg Historic District National Historic Site of Canada	Bluenose Drive, Lunenburg Harbour; Lunenburg NS	44°22′40″N 64°18′35″W	Federal (4256)	Q28833066	More images
Oxner-Zinck House	172 Highway 12; Chester Basin NS	44°34′16″N 64°18′44″W	Chester Basin municipality (10632)	Q137800804	Upload Photo
Samuel Prescott House	55 Central Street; Chester NS	44°32′17″N 64°14′34″W	Chester municipality (6963)	Q137800818	Upload Photo
Quarter Deck	6 Queen Street; Chester NS	44°19′16″N 64°08′32″W	Chester municipality (7020)	Q137800829	Upload Photo
Riverview Community Centre	1153 King Street; Bridgewater NS	44°23′24″N 64°31′58″W	Bridgewater municipality (11901)	Q137800838	Upload Photo
Robinson House	78 Queen Street; Chester NS	44°32′24″N 64°14′24″W	Chester municipality (6964)	Q137800851	Upload Photo
Rosebank Cottage	Ross Farm Museum; 4568 Highway 12; New Ross NS	44°43′36″N 64°27′25″W	New Ross municipality (8748)	Q137800868	Upload Photo
Daniel Rudolf House	325 Lincoln Street; Lunenburg NS	44°22′38″N 64°18′28″W	Lunenburg municipality (2136)	Q102260821	More images
Saint Andrews Presbyterian Church	3483 Highway 332; Rose Bay NS	44°17′55″N 64°18′22″W	Rose Bay municipality (5714)	Q137170447	More images
St. Andrew's Presbyterian Church	111 Townsend Street; Lunenburg NS	44°22′38″N 64°18′27″W	Lunenburg municipality (1639)	Q28233099	More images
St. Barnabas Anglican Church	4936 Highway 329; Blandford NS	44°29′44″N 64°06′32″W	Blandford municipality (11196)	Q137800913	Upload Photo
Saint Barnabas' Church	1396 Blue Rocks Road; Blue Rocks NS	44°21′22″N 64°14′33″W	Blue Rocks municipality (5729)	Q137800925	Upload Photo
St. George's Anglican Church	7338 Highway No 329; East River NS	44°34′25″N 64°09′14″W	East River municipality (10929)	Q137800938	Upload Photo
St. James' Anglican Church	65 Edgewater Street; Mahone Bay NS	44°27′02″N 64°22′48″W	Mahone Bay municipality (11975)	Q115977905	More images
St. John's Anglican Church - National Historic Site of Canada	2 Cumberland Street; Lunenburg NS	44°22′41″N 64°18′41″W	Federal (12344), Nova Scotia (5449)	Q23009312	More images
St. John's Anglican Church Rectory	58 Townsend Street; Lunenburg NS	44°22′42″N 64°18′46″W	Lunenburg municipality (2009)	Q137800949	More images
St. John's Evangelical Lutheran Church	89 Edgewater Street; Mahone Bay NS	44°27′04″N 64°22′49″W	Mahone Bay municipality (12058)	Q115977929	More images
St. John Evangelist Anglican Church	388 LaHave Islands Road; Bell Island, LaHave Island NS	44°13′32″N 64°21′32″W	Bell Island, LaHave Island municipality (5683)	Q137800958	Upload Photo
St. John's Parish Hall	65 Cumberland Street; Lunenburg NS	44°22′42″N 64°18′44″W	Lunenburg municipality (2014)	Q137800979	Upload Photo
Saint Mark's Evangelical Lutheran Church	1231 Back Cornwall Road; Middle New Cornwall NS	44°30′12″N 64°28′47″W	Middle New Cornwall municipality (5751)	Q137162693	Upload Photo
St. Matthew's Evangelical Lutheran Church	3472 No. 332 Highway; Rose Bay NS	44°17′54″N 64°18′22″W	Rose Bay municipality (5684)	Q137170559	More images
St. Norbert's Roman Catholic Church	121 York Street; Lunenburg NS	44°22′45″N 64°18′35″W	Lunenburg municipality (2135)	Q136498889	More images
St. Paul's United Church	135 Stonehurst Road; Blue Rocks NS	44°21′40″N 64°14′17″W	Blue Rocks municipality (5752)	Q137801065	Upload Photo
St. Peter's Lutheran Church	5 Old Trunk Road No. 3 (Commons Road); Chester NS	44°33′00″N 64°14′00″W	Chester municipality (9180)	Q137801071	Upload Photo
St. Stephen's Anglican Church	60 Regent Street; Chester NS	44°32′29″N 64°14′32″W	Chester municipality (11326)	Q137801087	Upload Photo
38 School Street	38 School Street; Mahone Bay NS	44°26′49″N 64°22′50″W	Mahone Bay municipality (11845)	Q137801104	More images
Selig House	74 Cornwallis Street; Lunenburg NS	44°22′46″N 64°18′41″W	Lunenburg municipality (2684)	Q136498771	More images
Simpsons Corner Union Church	1315 Highway 208; Simpsons Corner NS	44°32′26″N 64°46′53″W	Simpsons Corner municipality (5731)	Q137801114	Upload Photo
Smith House	58 Hopson Street; Lunenburg NS	44°22′42″N 64°18′24″W	Lunenburg municipality (1529)	Q102341186	More images
Charles Smith House	321 Lincoln Street; Lunenburg NS	44°22′38″N 64°18′28″W	Lunenburg municipality (1672)	Q102232362	More images
Captain William Smith House	361 Lincoln Street; Lunenburg NS	44°22′38″N 64°18′22″W	Lunenburg municipality (2004)	Q102260530	More images
Solomon House	69 Townsend Street; Lunenburg NS	44°22′49″N 64°18′49″W	Lunenburg municipality (1549)	Q136498901	More images
Taffrail Cottage	18 Queen Street; Chester NS	44°19′17″N 64°08′33″W	Chester municipality (6966)	Q137803317	Upload Photo
Terrace Cottage	19 King Street; Chester NS	44°32′15″N 64°14′31″W	Chester municipality (6965)	Q137803324	Upload Photo
Trinity United Church	101 Edgewater Street; Mahone Bay NS	44°27′06″N 64°22′50″W	Mahone Bay municipality (12095)	Q115977944	More images
Union Church of Indian Point	181 Indian Point Road; Indian Point NS	44°27′37″N 64°18′44″W	Indian Point municipality (5732)	Q137803338	Upload Photo
United Baptist Church, Mahone Bay	56 Maple Street; Mahone Bay NS	44°26′48″N 64°22′46″W	Mahone Bay municipality (12097)	Q136497110	More images
Zoé Vallé Memorial Library	63 Regent Street; Chester NS	44°32′29″N 64°14′32″W	Chester municipality (7005)	Q17124172	More images
Walters Blacksmith Shop	2 Kempt Street; Lunenburg NS	44°22′34″N 64°18′21″W	Lunenburg municipality (2056)	Q136498912	More images
Captain Angus Walters House	37 Tannery Road; Lunenburg NS	44°22′30″N 64°19′08″W	Lunenburg municipality (2692)	Q137803347	Upload Photo
Wecob	Wake Up Hill Road; Marriotts Cove NS	44°33′26″N 64°16′13″W	Nova Scotia (7423), Marriotts Cove municipality (15301)	Q137162830	Upload Photo
Wilson House	315 Lincoln Street; Lunenburg NS	44°22′38″N 64°18′30″W	Lunenburg municipality (1936)	Q131319176	More images
Wolff House	28 King Street; Lunenburg NS	44°22′39″N 64°18′34″W	Lunenburg municipality (2032)	Q102260648	More images
Young House	95 Montague Street; Lunenburg NS	44°22′36″N 64°18′38″W	Lunenburg municipality (2690)	Q137803353	Upload Photo
John B. Young House	21 Falkland Street; Lunenburg NS	44°22′40″N 64°19′02″W	Lunenburg municipality (2051)	Q136498718	More images
Zion Evangelical Lutheran Church	65 Fox Street; Lunenburg NS	44°22′45″N 64°18′44″W	Nova Scotia (6281), Lunenburg municipality (1666)	Q28233072	More images
Zwicker House	13-15 King Street; Lunenburg NS	44°22′38″N 64°18′36″W	Lunenburg municipality (2171)	Q56449970	More images

== See also ==
- List of historic places in Nova Scotia
- List of National Historic Sites of Canada in Nova Scotia
- Heritage Property Act (Nova Scotia)
