= List of historic places in Victoria County, Nova Scotia =

Victoria County is a historical county and census division of Nova Scotia, Canada. This list compiles historic places recognized by the Canadian Register of Historic Places within the county.

== List of historic places ==
Name	Address	Coordinates	Government recognition (CRHP №)	Wikidata ID	Image
Administration Building	Cabot Trail at Park Headquarters Lane; Ingonish NS	46°38′46″N 60°24′08″W	Federal (11347)	Q137272595	Upload Photo
Alexander Graham Bell Museum	Chebucto Street; Baddeck NS	46°06′19″N 60°44′37″W	Federal (9511, (1154)	Q4718994	More images
Gilbert H. Grosvenor Hall	532 Chebucto Street; Baddeck NS	46°06′03″N 60°44′53″W	Nova Scotia (6284)	Q5560948	More images
Information Bureau	Cape Breton Highlands National Park; Ingonish NS	46°42′00″N 60°21′38″W	Federal (9756)	Q137272611	Upload Photo
Lone Shieling	Cape Breton Highlands National Park; Pleasant Bay NS	46°43′49″N 60°30′55″W	Federal (9772)	Q65044079	More images
MacDonald House	IFF/15-Y1 Hector's Point; Iona NS	45°56′54″N 60°49′14″W	Nova Scotia (2635)	Q137272635	Upload Photo
MacQuarrie House	2639 Cabot Trail; Upper Middle River NS	46°11′05″N 60°56′03″W	Upper Middle River municipality (12342)	Q137272648	Upload Photo
MacRae-Bitterman House	Washabuck Road; Upper Middle River NS	46°01′06″N 60°51′34″W	Nova Scotia (3465)	Q137272656	Upload Photo
Neils Harbour Lighthouse	Lighthouse Road; Neils Harbour NS	46°48′24″N 60°19′08″W	Federal (11257, (20915)	Q28375820	More images
St. Andrew's Church	1450 Westside Baddeck Road; Baddeck NS	46°10′43″N 60°46′09″W	Baddeck municipality (12208)	Q137272669	Upload Photo
St. Mark's Masonic Lodge	24 Queen Street; Baddeck NS	46°06′04″N 60°45′08″W	Baddeck municipality (12209)	Q7589967	More images
St. Paul Island Southwest Lighthouse	575 Dingwall Road; Dingwall NS	46°54′02″N 60°27′41″W	Federal (20378)	Q28375859	More images
Saint Peter's and Saint John's Anglican Church	Shore Road; Baddeck NS	46°05′51″N 60°45′21″W	Nova Scotia (13844)	Q16932923	More images
Superintendent's Residence	Cape Breton Highlands National Park; Ingonish Beach NS	46°38′45″N 60°24′06″W	Federal (11092)	Q137272681	Upload Photo
Victoria County Court House	495 Chebucto Street; Baddeck NS	46°06′01″N 60°45′04″W	Baddeck municipality (9812)	Q7926666	More images

== See also ==
- List of historic places in Nova Scotia
- List of National Historic Sites of Canada in Nova Scotia
- Heritage Property Act (Nova Scotia)
