= List of historic places in Pictou County, Nova Scotia =

Pictou County is a county in the Canadian province of Nova Scotia. This list compiles historic places recognized by the Canadian Register of Historic Places within the county.

== List of historic places ==
Name	Address	Coordinates	Government recognition (CRHP №)	Wikidata ID	Image
The Consulate	157 Water Street; Pictou NS	45°40′34″N 62°42′54″W	Nova Scotia (4945), Pictou municipality (6961)	Q137299528	Upload Photo
Federal Building	1870 South Main Street; Westville NS	45°33′33″N 62°42′47″W	Federal (4663)	Q137299567	Upload Photo
General Manager's House	2362 Cowan Street; Westville NS	45°34′00″N 62°43′20″W	Nova Scotia (14382)	Q137162373	Upload Photo
Government of Canada Building (New Glasgow)	340 East River Road; New Glasgow NS	45°35′02″N 62°38′43″W	Federal (7525)	Q137299597	Upload Photo
Government of Canada Building (Pictou)	340 Front Street; Pictou NS	45°40′38″N 62°42′07″W	Federal (9509)	Q137299604	Upload Photo
McCulloch House	86 Haliburton Road; Pictou NS	45°40′37″N 62°43′20″W	Nova Scotia (1273)	Q6800757	More images
Murray House	2649 Station Road; River John NS	45°44′54″N 63°03′28″W	River John municipality (6591)	Q137299617	Upload Photo
New Caledonian Curling Club	66 Water Street (Old); 66 Caladh Street (New); Pictou NS	45°40′32″N 62°42′39″W	Pictou municipality (7127)	Q131847067	Upload Photo
Pictou Academy National Historic Site of Canada	corner of Church Street and Willow Street; Pictou NS	45°40′37″N 62°42′56″W	Federal (14445)	Q22978863	Upload Photo
Pictou Iron Foundry	100, 102 & 106 Front Street; Pictou NS	45°40′37″N 62°42′18″W	Nova Scotia (14796)	Q137299632	Upload Photo
Pictou Railway Station (Intercolonial) National Historic Site of Canada	Front Street; Pictou NS	45°41′00″N 62°43′00″W	Federal (7470)	Q23010237	More images
Saint Anne's Mission Church	Indian Island, Indian Island, Merigomish Harbour NS	45°37′38″N 62°28′51″W	Nova Scotia (8320)	Q137162778	Upload Photo
Stella Maris Church	40 St. Stephen Street; Pictou NS	45°40′44″N 62°42′17″W	Nova Scotia (13459)	Q137299657	Upload Photo
Stella Maris Convent	159 Denoon Street; Pictou NS	45°40′47″N 62°42′15″W	Nova Scotia (13461)	Q137299668	Upload Photo
98 Water Street	98 Water Street; Pictou NS	45°40′35″N 62°42′46″W	Pictou municipality (7126)	Q137162570	Upload Photo
West Branch United Church	19 West Branch Road; West Branch River John NS	45°38′28″N 63°02′22″W	West Branch River John municipality (7128)	Q137162708	More images
The Willow House	11 Willow Street; Pictou NS	45°40′36″N 63°42′55″W	Pictou municipality (6960)	Q137162883	Upload Photo

== See also ==
- List of historic places in Nova Scotia
- List of National Historic Sites of Canada in Nova Scotia
- Heritage Property Act (Nova Scotia)
