= List of historic places in Richmond County, Nova Scotia =

Richmond County is a historical county and census division of Nova Scotia, Canada. This list compiles historic places recognized by the Canadian Register of Historic Places within the county.

== List of historic places ==
Name	Address	Coordinates	Government recognition (CRHP №)	Wikidata ID	Image
Chapel Island National Historic Site of Canada	233 Chapel Island Rd. Chapel Island NS	45°41′33″N 60°45′51″W	Federal (3216)	Q4966297	More images
Captain James Embree House	209 Granville Street; Port Hawkesbury NS	45°36′59″N 61°21′54″W	Nova Scotia (3555)	Q137260296	Upload Photo
Flynn-Cutler-Robichaud House	694 Lower Road; Arichat NS	45°30′39″N 61°00′48″W	Nova Scotia (5323)	Q137260304	Upload Photo
Fort Toulouse Archaeological Site - BjCf-02	Battery Provincial Park; St. Peter's NS	45°39′24″N 60°52′01″W	Nova Scotia (7087)	Q23820158	Upload Photo
LeNoir Forge	712 Lower Road; Arichat NS	45°30′37″N 61°00′42″W	Nova Scotia (2806)	Q136800488	Upload Photo
Leonard House	36 Manse Road; West Bay NS	45°42′24″N 61°10′07″W	West Bay municipality (12015)	Q137260307	Upload Photo
Lockmaster's House	St. Peters Canal National Historic Site; St. Peter's NS	45°39′31″N 60°51′53″W	Federal (4771)	Q3280110	Upload Photo
MacAskill House	7 MacAskill Drive; St. Peter's NS	45°39′20″N 60°52′41″W	Nova Scotia (7334)	Q136800580	Upload Photo
The Morrison House	3258 West Bay Highway; St. George's Channel NS	45°42′54″N 61°03′12″W	Nova Scotia (3067)	Q137260318	Upload Photo
Notre Dame de l'Assomption	2292 No. 206 Highway; Arichat NS	45°30′36″N 61°01′57″W	Nova Scotia (6526)	Q137260326	More images
Port Toulouse Archaeological Site - BjCf-03	Battery Provincial Park; St. Peter's NS	45°39′24″N 60°52′01″W	Nova Scotia (7010)	Q3398314	Upload Photo
St. Peters Canal National Historic Site of Canada	Highway 4 St. Peter's NS	45°39′18″N 60°52′10″W	Federal (4487)	Q2936024	More images
St. Peters National Historic Site of Canada	The isthmus of St. Peter's; St. Peter's NS	45°39′00″N 60°51′58″W	Federal (12764)	Q137260336	More images

== See also ==
- List of historic places in Nova Scotia
- List of National Historic Sites of Canada in Nova Scotia
- Heritage Property Act (Nova Scotia)
