= List of historic places in the Region of Queens Municipality =

The Region of Queens Municipality is a regional municipality in southwestern Nova Scotia, Canada. This list compiles historic places recognized by the Canadian Register of Historic Places within the county.

== List of historic places ==
Name	Address	Coordinates	Government recognition (CRHP №)	Wikidata ID	Image
Elisha Calkin House	63 Main Street; Liverpool NS	44°02′28″N 64°42′39″W	Nova Scotia (7695)	Q137181241	Upload Photo
Fort Point Lighthouse	21 Fort Point Road; Liverpool NS	44°02′36″N 64°42′31″W	Nova Scotia (3613)	Q28232897	More images
Zoeth Freeman House	348 Highway 8 Milton NS	44°03′48″N 64°45′17″W	Milton municipality (15389)	Q137272692	Upload Photo
Kejimkujik National Historic Site of Canada	Kejimkujik National Park of Canada; Liverpool area NS	44°22′18″N 65°17′59″W	Federal (11842)	Q795176	More images
Liverpool Court House	137 Church Street; Liverpool NS	44°02′18″N 64°42′44″W	Nova Scotia (3542)	Q137272702	Upload Photo
Liverpool Town Hall National Historic Site of Canada	219 Main Street; Liverpool NS	44°02′19″N 64°42′55″W	Federal (12022), Nova Scotia (5770)	Q23011162	More images
Morton House	147 Main Street; Milton NS	44°03′15″N 64°44′32″W	Nova Scotia (3139)	Q137272708	Upload Photo
Old Common Burial Ground	293 Main Street; Liverpool NS	44°02′17″N 64°43′00″W	Liverpool municipality (15403)	Q137272713	Upload Photo
Old Port Medway Cemetery	Port Medway Road; Port Medway NS	44°07′50″N 64°34′28″W	Nova Scotia (10541), Port Medway municipality (15601)	Q137272719	Upload Photo
Perkins House	115 Main Street; Liverpool NS	44°02′25″N 64°42′45″W	Nova Scotia (1262)	Q103963416	More images
Port Joli Community Hall	10032 No. 103 Highway; Port Joli NS	43°52′41″N 64°54′05″W	Port Joli municipality (15610)	Q136485205	More images
Port Medway Lighthouse	1727 Port Medway Road; Port Medway NS	44°07′20″N 64°36′28″W	Port Medway municipality (15611)	Q28321252	More images
Port Medway Meeting House	162 Long Cove Road; Port Medway NS	44°07′33″N 64°34′00″W	Nova Scotia (3200)	Q103215105	More images
Port Mouton Lighthouse	Spectacle Island; Port Mouton NS	43°55′06″N 64°48′14″W	Federal (20719)	Q45324371	Upload Photo
Zion United Church and Cemetery	409 Main Street; Liverpool NS	44°02′12″N 64°43′08″W	Liverpool municipality (15388)	Q137272726	Upload Photo

== See also ==
- List of historic places in Nova Scotia
- List of National Historic Sites of Canada in Nova Scotia
- Heritage Property Act (Nova Scotia)
- Queens County Museum
