= Holy Ghost Ukrainian Church =

Ukrainian Greek Catholic church in Canada

- Holy Ghost Ukrainian Church
- 46.1579°N 60.1809°W
- Location: Whitney Pier
- Country: Canada
- Languages: English; Ukrainian
- Denomination: Catholic Church
- Sui iuris church: Ukrainian Greek Catholic
- Tradition: Byzantine Rite
- Website: ukrainianparishsydney.ca

History
- Former name: Nykyta Budka
- Status: Parish Church
- Founded: 1912
- Events: Burned 1933

Architecture
- Functional status: Active
- Years built: 1913
- Completed: Nov 1913

Clergy
- Priest: Fr. Roman Dusanowskyj Fr. Volodymyr Perun

Nova Scotia Heritage Property Act
- Type: Provincially Registered Property
- Designated: 1984
- Reference no.: 00PNS0030

Holy Ghost Ukrainian Church is a Ukrainian Greek Catholic church in Whitney Pier, a neighbourhood of Sydney, Nova Scotia. Founded in 1912, the parish serves the Ukrainian community in Cape Breton. It is the only Ukrainian Greek Catholic church in Canada east of Montreal. Holy Ghost is a parish in the Montreal-Ottawa deanery of the Ukrainian Catholic Eparchy of Toronto and Eastern Canada. The church was designated a Nova Scotian heritage property in 1984.

The façade of the Holy Ghost Ukrainian Church, taken in 1934.
