= List of historic places in Colchester County, Nova Scotia =

Colchester County is a county in the Canadian province of Nova Scotia. This list compiles historic places recognized by the Canadian Register of Historic Places within the county.

== List of historic places ==
Name	Address	Coordinates	Government recognition (CRHP №)	Wikidata ID	Image
C.B. Archibald House	86 Queen Street; Truro NS	45°21′59″N 63°16′56″W	Nova Scotia (6658), Truro municipality (2072)	Q137260370	Upload Photo
Peter McGregor Archibald House	1178 Prince Street; Truro NS	45°21′52″N 63°15′42″W	Truro municipality (6269)	Q137260942	Upload Photo
Armoury	126 Willow Street; Truro NS	45°21′39″N 63°17′21″W	Federal (4730)	Q137270463	More images
Balmoral Grist Mill	660 Matheson Brook Road; Tatamagouche NS	45°38′44″N 63°11′41″W	Nova Scotia (15146)	Q4852386	More images
Archibald Beck House	43 Dominion Street; Truro NS	45°22′11″N 63°17′03″W	Truro municipality (1584)	Q137260953	Upload Photo
138 Brunswick Street	138 Brunswick Street; Truro NS	45°21′44″N 63°16′13″W	Truro municipality (6231)	Q137260976	Upload Photo
James Braynion House	113 Queen Street; Truro NS	45°21′59″N 63°16′49″W	Truro municipality (1675)	Q137260985	Upload Photo
George A. Christie House	14 Wood Street; Truro NS	45°21′51″N 63°15′54″W	Truro municipality (6270)	Q137260990	Upload Photo
Colchester County Court House	1 Church Street; Truro NS	45°21′57″N 63°16′33″W	Truro municipality (2098)	Q137261034	Upload Photo
Colchester Historical Museum	29 Young Street; Truro NS	45°21′50″N 63°16′45″W	Truro municipality (2165)	Q136799304	Upload Photo
Debert Palaeo-Indian Site National Historic Site of Canada	On the grounds of the former CFS Debert; Debert NS	45°25′08″N 63°24′58″W	Federal (4206), Nova Scotia (15981)	Q16973360	Upload Photo
Henry A. Dickie House	79 Exhibition Street; Truro NS	45°21′32″N 63°16′27″W	Truro municipality (6267)	Q137261087	Upload Photo
John Logan Doggett House	111 Willow Street; Truro NS	45°21′41″N 63°17′18″W	Nova Scotia (4095), Truro municipality (1999)	Q137261105	Upload Photo
Rupert Doyle House	114 Brunswick Street; Truro NS	45°21′44″N 63°16′19″W	Truro municipality (6193)	Q137261119	Upload Photo
67 Duke Street	67 Duke Street; Truro NS	45°21′52″N 63°17′02″W	Truro municipality (1597)	Q137261124	Upload Photo
W.H. Faltenhine House	114 Victoria Street; Truro NS	45°21′45″N 63°16′53″W	Truro municipality (2080)	Q137261134	Upload Photo
11 Faulkner Street	11 Faulkner Street; Truro NS	45°21′49″N 63°16′51″W	Truro municipality (1599)	Q137261145	Upload Photo
Abram K. Feetham House	94 Arthur Street; Truro NS	45°21′40″N 63°17′05″W	Truro municipality (1574)	Q137261153	Upload Photo
Charles S. Feetham House	40 Ross Street; Truro NS	45°21′36″N 63°16′27″W	Truro municipality (6276)	Q137261175	Upload Photo
First United Church	711 Prince Street; Truro NS	45°21′54″N 63°16′48″W	Nova Scotia (4100), Truro municipality (1995)	Q137261181	Upload Photo
Fraser Octagon House	63 Church Street; Tatamagouche NS	45°42′41″N 63°17′32″W	Nova Scotia (6788)	Q14875669	More images
Heritage Conservation District I	Muir, Faulkner, Pleasant and Victoria Streets; Truro NS	45°21′48″N 63°16′52″W	Truro municipality (2726)	Q137270563	Upload Photo
Heritage Conservation District II	Dominion, Duke, King, and Victoria Streets; Truro NS	45°21′48″N 63°16′52″W	Truro municipality (2727)	Q137270581	Upload Photo
Heritage Conservation District III	Victoria and King Streets; Truro NS	45°21′44″N 63°17′11″W	Truro municipality (2728)	Q137270593	Upload Photo
William J. Kent House	63 Queen Street; Truro NS	45°22′01″N 63°17′00″W	Truro municipality (1680)	Q137261209	Upload Photo
Henry Lawrence House	77 Queen Street; Truro NS	45°22′00″N 63°16′57″W	Truro municipality (1681)	Q137261216	Upload Photo
Norman J. Layton House	142 Smith Avenue; Truro NS	45°21′50″N 63°17′18″W	Truro municipality (1683)	Q137261229	Upload Photo
Hugh P. MacKay House	24 Victoria Street; Truro NS	45°21′43″N 63°17′13″W	Truro municipality (1693)	Q137261238	Upload Photo
Malcolm MacKinnon House	318 Brunswick Street; Truro NS	45°21′49″N 63°15′36″W	Truro municipality (6265)	Q137261246	Upload Photo
C.A. MacQuarrie House	51 Queen Street; Truro NS	45°22′01″N 63°17′03″W	Truro municipality (1628)	Q137261253	Upload Photo
McCurdy House	78 Willow Street; Truro NS	45°21′46″N 63°17′18″W	Truro municipality (1896)	Q137261268	Upload Photo
Frank McCurdy House	102 Willow Street; Truro NS	45°21′43″N 63°17′19″W	Truro municipality (1898)	Q137261302	Upload Photo
R.O. McCurdy House	114 Willow Street; Truro NS	45°21′42″N 63°17′20″W	Truro municipality (2081)	Q137261480	Upload Photo
McMullen-Snook House	115 Victoria Street; Truro NS	45°21′47″N 63°16′54″W	Truro municipality (1694)	Q137261505	Upload Photo
Charles B. McMullen House	127 Park Street; Truro NS	45°22′02″N 63°17′06″W	Truro municipality (3154)	Q137261511	Upload Photo
Horace G. Mosher House	11 Victoria Street; Truro NS	45°21′45″N 63°17′15″W	Truro municipality (1684)	Q137261516	Upload Photo
21 Muir Street	21 Muir Street; Truro NS	45°21′51″N 63°16′53″W	Truro municipality (1602)	Q137261565	Upload Photo
John O'Brien House	121 Victoria Street; Truro NS	45°21′47″N 63°16′52″W	Truro municipality (1817)	Q137261609	Upload Photo
Old Provincial Normal College	752 Prince Street; Truro NS	45°21′51″N 63°16′43″W	Nova Scotia (2636), Truro municipality (1998)	Q59508756	Upload Photo
Frederick Prince House	61 Dominion Street; Truro NS	45°21′48″N 63°17′02″W	Truro municipality (1588)	Q137262020	Upload Photo
Robie Street Cemetery	125 Robie Street; Truro NS	45°22′11″N 63°18′23″W	Nova Scotia (12898), Truro municipality (2031)	Q133856797	Upload Photo
Gordon Ross House	24 Lansdoon Place; Truro NS	45°21′35″N 63°16′24″W	Truro municipality (6268)	Q137262066	Upload Photo
Catherine Ryan House	126 Victoria Street; Truro NS	45°21′46″N 63°16′51″W	Truro municipality (1864)	Q137262077	Upload Photo
St. John's Anglican Church	23 Church Street; Truro NS	45°21′53″N 63°16′33″W	Truro municipality (1583)	Q137270546	More images
Reverend James Smith Property	5305 No. 289 Highway; Upper Stewiacke NS	45°13′12″N 62°59′54″W	Nova Scotia (7263)	Q137270536	Upload Photo
John Smith House	410 Prince Street; Truro NS	45°21′58″N 63°17′32″W	Truro municipality (3162)	Q137262181	Upload Photo
John S. Smith House	107 Willow Street; Truro NS	45°21′42″N 63°17′17″W	Truro municipality (1899)	Q137262393	Upload Photo
Richard Smith House	91 Smith Avenue; Truro NS	45°21′51″N 63°17′28″W	Truro municipality (1676)	Q137262396	Upload Photo
Lorenzo Spencer House	20 Dominion Street; Truro NS	45°21′53″N 63°17′05″W	Truro municipality (1586)	Q137270381	Upload Photo
Charles E. Stanfield House	44 Dominion Street; Truro NS	45°21′50″N 63°17′05″W	Truro municipality (1585)	Q137270389	Upload Photo
Sutherland Steam Mill	3169 Highway No. 326; Tatamagouche NS	45°42′39″N 63°09′37″W	Nova Scotia (12503)	Q7649997	More images
David Thomas House	140 Pleasant Street; Truro NS	45°21′35″N 63°16′53″W	Truro municipality (3155)	Q137270408	Upload Photo
Rufus A. Tremain House	78 King Street; Truro NS	45°21′58″N 63°17′32″W	Truro municipality (3156)	Q137270413	Upload Photo
Truro Post Office National Historic Site of Canada	695 Prince Street; Truro NS	45°21′54″N 63°16′50″W	Federal (7751)	Q22984567	Upload Photo
M.L. Urquhart House	115 Willow Street; Truro NS	45°21′41″N 63°17′18″W	Truro municipality (2099)	Q137270418	Upload Photo
Ernest D. Vernon House	153 Dominion Street; Truro NS	45°21′32″N 63°16′56″W	Truro municipality (1594)	Q137270426	Upload Photo
Mary Vernon House	70 King Street; Truro NS	45°21′46″N 63°17′07″W	Truro municipality (1601)	Q137270434	Upload Photo
Victoria Square	493 Prince Street; Truro NS	45°21′59″N 63°17′13″W	Truro municipality (1603)	Q137270513	Upload Photo
Yuill Barn	3214 No. 236 Highway; Old Barns NS	45°21′14″N 63°22′23″W	Nova Scotia (7341)	Q137162906	Upload Photo
Zion Baptist Church	454 Prince Street; Truro NS	45°21′57″N 63°17′23″W	Truro municipality (2450)	Q137270444	Upload Photo

== See also ==
- List of historic places in Nova Scotia
- List of National Historic Sites of Canada in Nova Scotia
- Heritage Property Act (Nova Scotia)
