= List of historic places in Kings County, Nova Scotia =

Kings County is a county in the Canadian province of Nova Scotia. This list compiles historic places recognized by the Canadian Register of Historic Places within the county.

== List of historic places ==
Name	Address	Coordinates	Government recognition (CRHP №)	Wikidata ID	Image
Acacia Grove / Prescott House National Historic Site of Canada	1633 Starr's Point Road; Starr's Point NS	45°06′41″N 64°23′09″W	Federal (1152), Nova Scotia (1499)	Q7240855	More images
Annandale	198 Main Street; Wolfville NS	45°05′33″N 64°21′04″W	Wolfville municipality (6516)	Q136483387	More images
The Barracks	1464 Starr's Point Road; Starr's Point NS	45°06′17″N 64°23′01″W	Nova Scotia (2909)	Q137212750	Upload Photo
Miss Baxter's House	15 Highland Avenue; Wolfville NS	45°05′24″N 64°21′50″W	Wolfville municipality (5165)	Q137212759	Upload Photo
Blue Cottage	1172 Huntington Point Road; Halls Harbour NS	45°11′51″N 64°38′27″W	Nova Scotia (4119)	Q107302276	More images
Sir Frederick Borden Residence National Historic Site of Canada	9752 Main Street; Canning NS	45°09′00″N 64°25′00″W	Federal (7865), Nova Scotia (13851)	Q23015935	Upload Photo
Borden House	1999 Grand Pre Road; Grand Pre NS	45°06′00″N 64°18′18″W	Nova Scotia (7321)	Q136483468	More images
Brown House	242 Main Street; Wolfville NS	45°05′33″N 64°21′16″W	Wolfville municipality (6676)	Q137212764	Upload Photo
Building 18	Kentville Agricultural Centre; Kentville NS	45°04′15″N 64°28′48″W	Federal (10469)	Q136483476	More images
The Burying Ground	Main Street; Wolfville NS	45°05′30″N 64°21′53″W	Nova Scotia (6542), Wolfville municipality (4160)	Q137212801	Upload Photo
Jeremiah Calkin House	210 Old Post Road; Grand Pre NS	45°06′17″N 64°18′15″W	Nova Scotia (6791)	Q136484281	More images
Carnegie Hall	Acadia University; Wolfville NS	45°05′17″N 64°22′02″W	Wolfville municipality (4512)	Q137212769	Upload Photo
Carwarden	640 Church Street; Chipmans Corner NS	45°06′05″N 64°27′36″W	Nova Scotia (6647)	Q137212781	Upload Photo
Chase House	600 Main Street; Wolfville NS	45°05′26″N 64°22′21″W	Wolfville municipality (4818)	Q105948192	More images
Christie House	503-505 Main Street, Acadia University campus Wolfville NS	45°05′28″N 64°21′54″W	Wolfville municipality (6678)	Q137212857	Upload Photo
Cochrane House	18 Acadia Street; Wolfville NS	45°05′24″N 64°21′43″W	Wolfville municipality (6517)	Q137220009	Upload Photo
Cornwallis Reformed Presbyterian Covenanter Church	4953 No. 221 Highway; Grafton NS	45°06′02″N 64°42′18″W	Nova Scotia (6649)	Q137220060	Upload Photo
Covenanters' Church National Historic Site of Canada	1989 Grand-Pre Road; Grand Pre NS	45°05′58″N 64°18′17″W	Federal (12343), Nova Scotia (7325)	Q3585489	More images
DeWolf House	155 Main Street; Wolfville NS	45°05′32″N 64°20′51″W	Wolfville municipality (6681)	Q136483401	More images
DeWolf-Clarke House	133 Main Street; Wolfville NS	45°05′34″N 64°20′47″W	Wolfville municipality (6593)	Q137220076	Upload Photo
Dimock House	15 Locust Avenue; Wolfville NS	45°05′24″N 64°21′28″W	Wolfville municipality (4914)	Q136483421	More images
Emmerson Hall	Acadia University; Wolfville NS	45°05′17″N 64°22′00″W	Wolfville municipality (4511)	Q137212673	More images
Fox Hill Cemetery	Church Street; Port Williams NS	45°06′46″N 64°24′17″W	Nova Scotia (6786)	Q136802837	More images
Goodwin House	9979 Highway No. 221; Habitant NS	45°09′19″N 64°24′40″W	Nova Scotia (7822)	Q137220110	Upload Photo
GowanBrae	273 Old Post Road; Grand Pre NS	45°06′24″N 64°18′05″W	Nova Scotia (3432)	Q137220151	Upload Photo
Grand Pré Heritage Conservation District	Village of Grand Pre; Grand Pre NS	45°03′49″N 64°11′04″W	Grand Pre municipality (16209)	Q1100749	More images
Grand-Pré National Historic Site of Canada	Highway 1 Grand Pre NS	45°06′34″N 64°18′41″W	Federal (3435)	Q2750074	More images
Grand-Pré Rural Historic District National Historic Site of Canada	Hortonville and Grand Pre; Hortonville and Grand Pre NS	45°06′38″N 64°18′26″W	Federal (15751)	Q1100749	More images
Hangar 10	CFB Greenwood; Greenwood NS	44°59′01″N 64°54′21″W	Federal (19619)	Q137272775	Upload Photo
Hangar 9	CFB Greenwood; Greenwood NS	44°59′04″N 64°54′22″W	Federal (19618)	Q137272785	Upload Photo
Harding House	220 Main Street; Wolfville NS	45°05′33″N 64°21′10″W	Wolfville municipality (4910)	Q137272791	Upload Photo
Harmony Lodge #52	1290 Victoria Street; Aylesford NS	45°01′49″N 64°50′15″W	Nova Scotia (7730)	Q137162599	Upload Photo
Herbin's Jewellers	453 Main Street; Wolfville NS	45°05′28″N 64°21′46″W	Wolfville municipality (4503)	Q136481616	More images
Hill House	17 Highland Avenue; Wolfville NS	45°05′23″N 64°21′50″W	Wolfville municipality (6679)	Q137220591	Upload Photo
Ilsley Homestead	4127 Brooklyn Street; Somerset NS	45°04′11″N 64°45′32″W	Nova Scotia (6790)	Q137220522	Upload Photo
Kent Lodge	654 Main Street; Wolfville NS	45°05′20″N 64°22′34″W	Nova Scotia (6485), Wolfville municipality (4888)	Q136484300	More images
Kentville Research Station, Research Station	Kentville NS	45°04′11″N 64°28′37″W	Federal (10041)	Q137220660	More images
Kinsman-Salsman House	213 Arnold Road; Grafton NS	45°03′51″N 64°25′12″W	Nova Scotia (7286)	Q137220698	Upload Photo
Ladies' Seminary National Historic Site of Canada	Acadia University; Wolfville NS	45°05′20″N 64°21′54″W	Federal (15183), Wolfville municipality (4575)	Q23011169	Upload Photo
Charles MacDonald House	19 Saxon Street; Centreville NS	45°07′35″N 64°31′23″W	Nova Scotia (4118)	Q5080544	More images
McElvy House	1108 Middle Street; Port Williams NS	45°05′51″N 64°24′29″W	Port Williams municipality (16181)	Q137220703	Upload Photo
Memorial Chapel	Grand Pre NHS; Grand Pre NS	45°06′N 64°19′W	Federal (3159)	Q117825653	More images
Oakes House	21 Prospect Street; Wolfville NS	45°05′19″N 64°21′44″W	Wolfville municipality (4922)	Q137220710	Upload Photo
Patterson House	36 Westwood Avenue; Wolfville NS	45°05′16″N 64°22′09″W	Wolfville municipality (6594)	Q137220716	Upload Photo
Pick House	19 Gaspereau Avenue; Wolfville NS	45°05′25″N 64°21′33″W	Wolfville municipality (4913)	Q137220722	Upload Photo
Prat House	176 Main St. Wolfville NS	45°05′32″N 64°20′57″W	Wolfville municipality (6277)	Q137220731	Upload Photo
Randall House	259 Main Street; Wolfville NS	45°05′31″N 64°21′19″W	Nova Scotia (6487), Wolfville municipality (4797)	Q136483434	More images
Reid House	2259 Gaspereau River Road; Avonport NS	45°05′58″N 64°15′33″W	Nova Scotia (7996)	Q137220738	Upload Photo
St. John's Anglican Church and Cemetery	1109 Church Street; Port Williams NS	45°06′34″N 64°26′00″W	Nova Scotia (9507)	Q137272806	Upload Photo
St. John's Anglican Church	164 Main Street; Wolfville NS	45°05′33″N 64°20′56″W	Wolfville municipality (6278)	Q137272808	Upload Photo
St. Mary's Anglican Church	20 Morden Road; Auburn NS	45°01′06″N 64°52′06″W	Nova Scotia (7809)	Q137272813	Upload Photo
Sanford Barn	921 North Medford Road; North Medford NS	45°11′33″N 64°22′22″W	Nova Scotia (7724)	Q137220762	Upload Photo
Jonathan Shearman House	1423 No. 341 Highway; Upper Canard NS	45°07′38″N 64°27′51″W	Nova Scotia (14922)	Q137220784	Upload Photo
Simms House	27 Acadia Street; Wolfville NS	45°05′22″N 64°21′51″W	Wolfville municipality (4890)	Q137220800	Upload Photo
Stewart House	264 Old Post Road; Grand Pre NS	45°06′21″N 64°18′05″W	Nova Scotia (6294)	Q136484318	More images
Thompson House	620 Main Street; Wolfville NS	45°05′24″N 64°22′26″W	Wolfville municipality (6515)	Q136483445	More images
Turner House	8876 Commercial Street; New Minas NS	45°04′07″N 64°28′01″W	Nova Scotia (7287)	Q137220808	Upload Photo
Wallace Row House	36-42 Acadia Street; Wolfville NS	45°05′23″N 64°21′48″W	Wolfville municipality (6677)	Q137220826	Upload Photo
Wickwire House	102 Main Street; Wolfville NS	45°05′38″N 64°20′38″W	Wolfville municipality (14383)	Q137220844	Upload Photo
Wolfville Canadian Pacific Heritage Railway Station	21 Elm Avenue (at Front Street); Wolfville NS	45°05′33″N 64°21′47″W	Federal (6724), Wolfville municipality (4159)	Q3098090	Upload Photo
Wright House	586 Main Street; Wolfville NS	45°05′25″N 64°22′17″W	Wolfville municipality (6680)	Q137220913	Upload Photo

== See also ==
- List of historic places in Nova Scotia
- List of National Historic Sites of Canada in Nova Scotia
- Heritage Property Act (Nova Scotia)
