= Indian Point =

Indian Point may refer to:

== Places ==
- Indian Point, Missouri, a village in Stone County, Missouri, United States
- Indian Point, Nova Scotia, Canada
- Indian Point, Bay d'Espoir, Newfoundland and Labrador, Canada
- Indian Point, a National Historic Site of Canada on Red Indian Lake, Newfoundland and Labrador, Canada
- Indianola, Texas, a ghost town in the United States; called Indian Point before 1849
- Cape Chaplino, a cape on the Bering Sea coast of Siberia sometimes referred to historically as "Indian Point"

== See also ==
- Indian Point Energy Center, a nuclear power plant in New York, United States
- India Point (disambiguation)
