= St. George's Church (Sydney, Nova Scotia) =

Anglican church in Nova Scotia, Canada

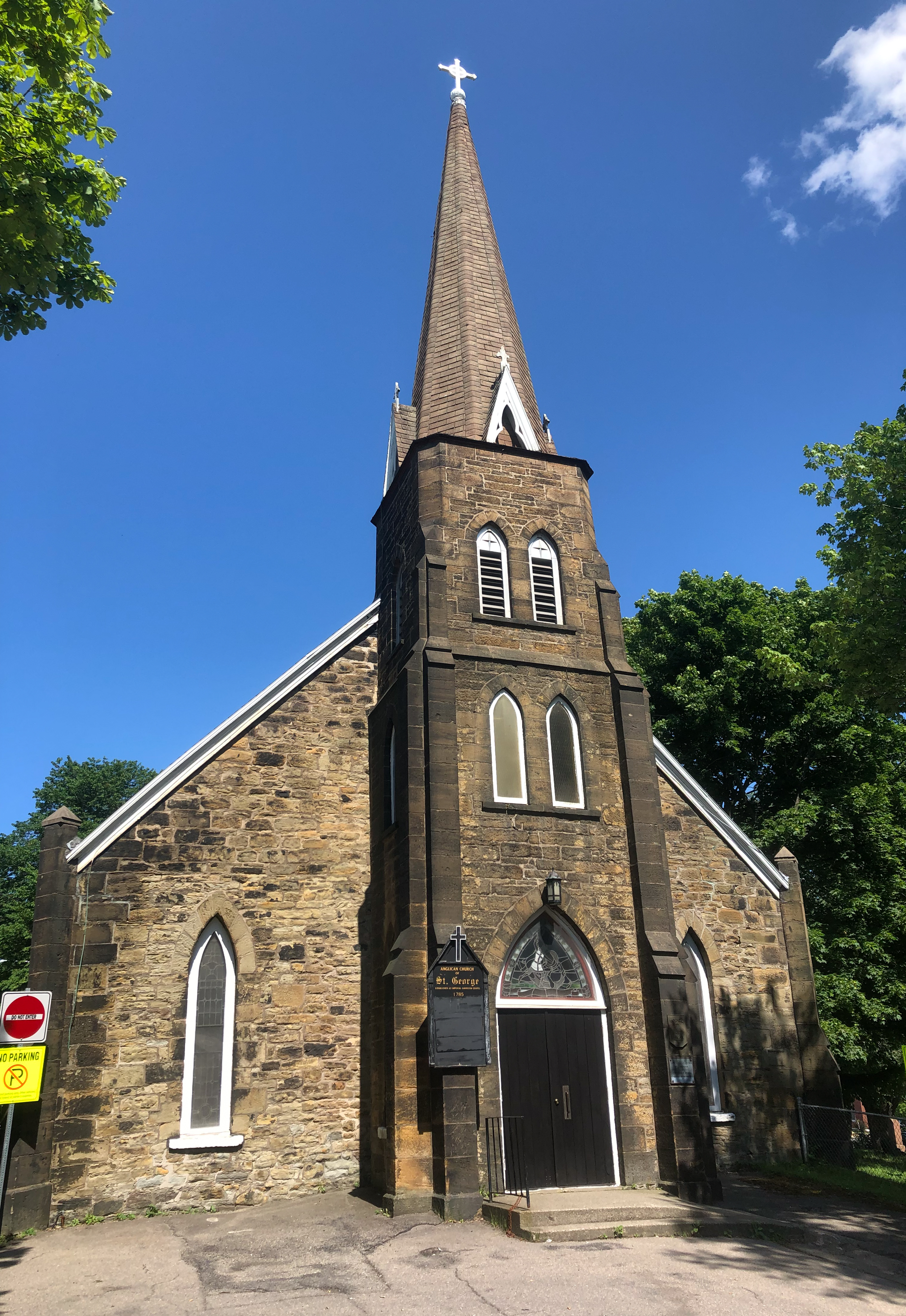
- St. George's Church
- 46.1426°N 60.1966°W
- Location: 119 Charlotte Street, Sydney, Nova Scotia B1P 1C2
- Country: Canada
- Language: English
- Denomination: Anglican

History
- Founded: 1785

Architecture
- Style: Gothic Revival
- Years built: 1785-1791
- Completed: 1791

Specifications
- Materials: Stone

Nova Scotia Heritage Property Act
- Type: Provincially Registered Property
- Designated: 1984-04-04
- Reference no.: 00PNS0026

St. George’s Church is an Anglican church in Sydney, Nova Scotia. Built between 1785 and 1791, it is the oldest building in Sydney and the oldest Anglican church in Cape Breton. The church was designated a Nova Scotian heritage property on April 4, 1984.

== History ==
The church was built by the 33rd Regiment of Foot. The structure was built using stone from the Fortress of Louisbourg.

The church held its first service on Christmas Day, 1789.

The Queen Mother attended a service at St. George's in 1967.
