= St. Philip's African Orthodox Church =

- St. Philip's African Orthodox Church
- 46.1532°N 60.1799°W
- Location: 34 Hankard Street, Whitney Pier, Sydney, Nova Scotia B1N 2C2
- Country: Canada
- Language: English
- Denomination: African Orthodox Church

History
- Founded: 1925

Architecture
- Style: Gothic
- Years built: 1900-1915
- Completed: 1928

Nova Scotia Heritage Property Act
- Type: Provincially Registered Property
- Designated: 1984
- Reference no.: 00PNS0031

St. Philip's African Orthodox Church is an African Orthodox church in Whitney Pier, a neighbourhood of Sydney, Nova Scotia. The church was designated a Nova Scotian heritage property in 1984. Alvinus Calder was one of the men who worked to establish a home for the church.
