= India Point =

India Point may refer to:

- India Point Park, in Providence, Rhode Island
- Indira Point, formerly called India Point, the southernmost point of India

== See also ==
- Indian Point (disambiguation)
