= List of historic places in Nova Scotia =

The list of historic places in the province of Nova Scotia contains heritage sites listed on the Canadian Register of Historic Places (CRHP), all of which are designated as historic places either locally, provincially, federally or by more than one level of government.

The list has been divided by county and regional municipality boundaries for reasons of length. See separate lists for the following geographic divisions:

- Cape Breton Regional Municipality
- Halifax Regional Municipality
- Region of Queens Municipality
- Annapolis County
- Antigonish County
- Colchester County
- Cumberland County
- Digby County
- Guysborough County
- Hants County
- Inverness County
- Kings County
- Lunenburg County
- Pictou County
- Richmond County
- Shelburne County
- Victoria County
- Yarmouth County

== See also ==
- List of National Historic Sites of Canada in Nova Scotia
- Heritage Property Act (Nova Scotia)
