= Old Guysborough Court House Museum =

Court house in Nova Scotia, Canada

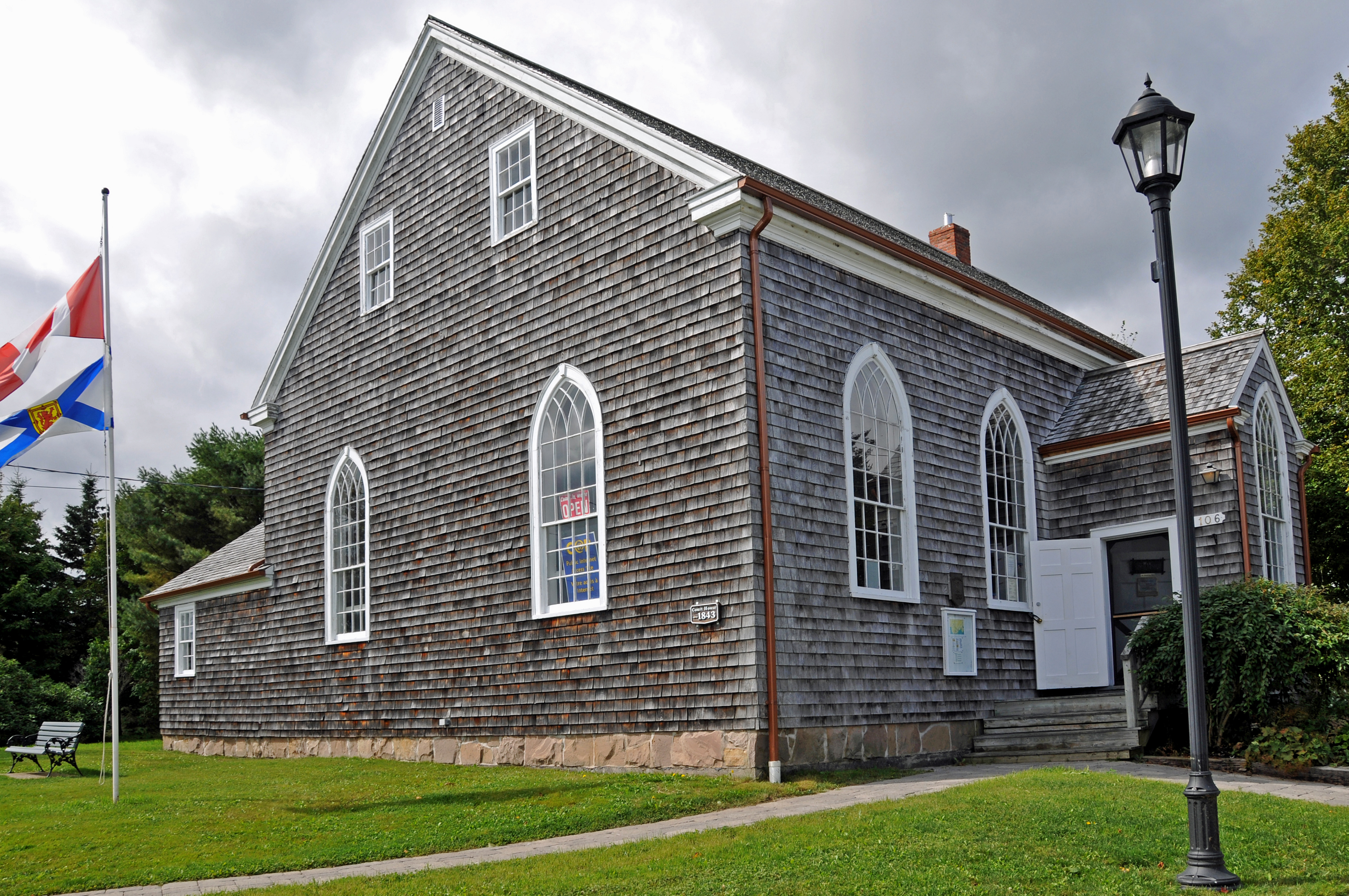
- The Old Court House in the 2010s
- Interactive map of the Old Guysborough Court House Museum area

General information
- Location: 106 Church Street, Guysborough, Nova Scotia, Guysborough, Canada
- Current tenants: Guysborough Historical Society
- Year built: 1842–1843
- Owner: Municipality of the District of Guysborough

Design and construction
- Architect: Elisha Randall

The Old Guysborough Court House Museum is a Provincial Heritage Property in Guysborough County, Nova Scotia, Canada. It was built in 1843 and served as the county's court house until 1974. The building was turned into a museum in 1974.

== Location ==
The court house is located at the corner of Church Street and Queen Street.

== History ==
The first courthouse in Guysborough was built at a different location in 1785, shortly after loyalist settlers arrived. In 1818, it was decided that a new courthouse should be built, and the new structure was built on the site of the present day building.

Carpenter Elisha Randall from Bayfield, Nova Scotia was given a contract to design and build a new court house in 1842. He added personal touches to the design, such as the gothic revival windows. The building was built with local materials in a simple symmetrical meeting house style.

As the only court house in the county, it became one of the most important buildings. It served not only as a court house, but also as Guysborough's town hall, enlistment office, and a venue for political debates and speeches.

The Court House fell out of use in 1973 when a new municipal building was constructed.

== Museum ==
In 1974, the building was saved from demolition by the newly formed Guysborough Historical Society. Since 1976 it has been open to the public as a local history museum and visitor information centre.

== See also ==
- Halifax Court House
- List of historic places in Guysborough County, Nova Scotia
