= Alvinus Calder =

Canadian physician (1892–1975)

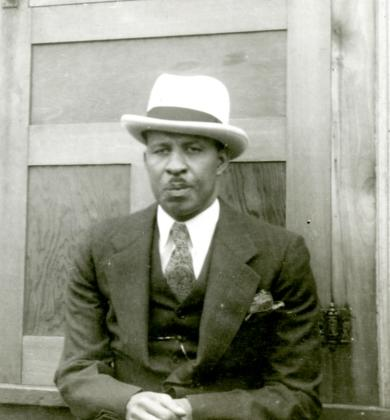
- Alvinus Calder in the 1930s
- Born: 1892; Grenada
- Died: 1975 (aged 82–83); Sydney, Nova Scotia, Canada
- Occupation: Physician

Alvinus Calder (1892 – 1975) was a Grenada-born Canadian physician who operated a medical practice in Sydney, Nova Scotia. Calder worked to establish a church in the area, providing a place of worship for local West Indian emigrants who were facing discrimination. He was the President of the UNIA Liberty Hall in Sydney and spent his life advocating for religious and ethnic causes.

== Biography ==
Calder was born in the island country of Grenada. He immigrated to Canada and attended St. Michael's College at the University of Toronto, being forced to leave by the university due to concerns that his presence would offend the other students on account of his race. He later attended Queens University, graduating in 1919 and subsequently moving to Sydney where he opened his medical practice in the Whitney Pier neighbourhood in 1920. Calder was a religious man and worked to establish the St. Philip's African Orthodox Church a permanent home in Sydney, providing a place of worship for local West Indian Episcopalians who were facing discrimination in the area. He owned a property on Kings Road in Sydney known as Calderwood.

Calder was an active member of the Universal Negro Improvement Association (UNIA) and became the first President of the UNIA Liberty Hall in Sydney in 1919. He spent the remainder of his life in Sydney advocating for religious and ethnic causes.

Calder died in Sydney in 1975.

== See also ==
- Black Nova Scotians
