= Zoé Vallé Memorial Library =

Coordinates: 44.541327°N 64.242334°W

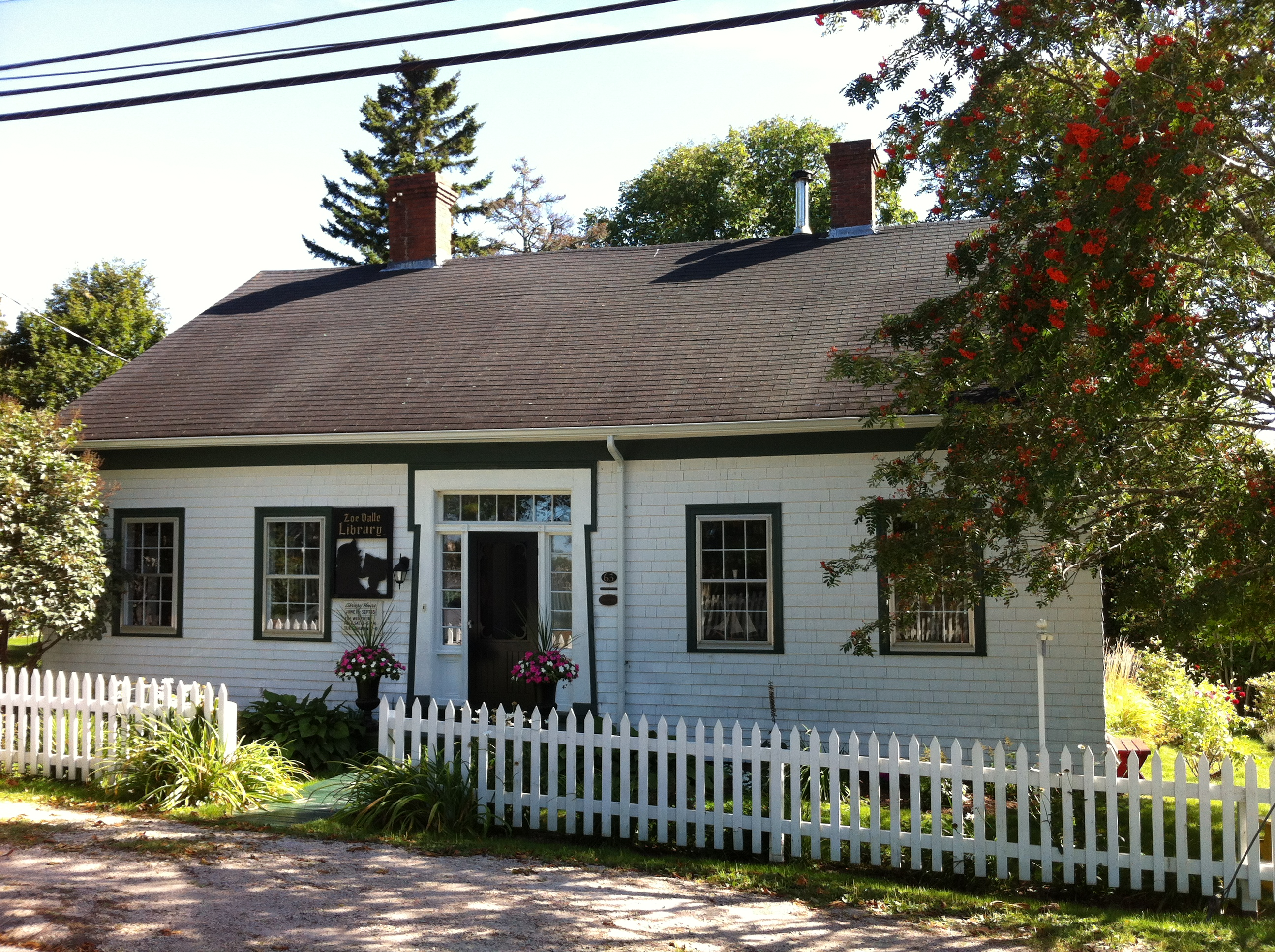
Zoé Vallé Memorial Library Chester Nova Scotia, Canada

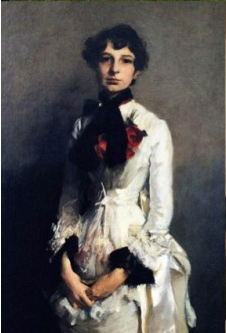
Isabel Vallé Austen – donated her sister Zoe's home to be a library. Portrait by John Singer Sargent

The Zoé Vallé Memorial Library is a library in Chester, Nova Scotia, Canada that was established in 1928. The library was the home of long-time summer resident Marie Zoé Vallé Lightfoot (1849–1926). She was from St. Louis, Missouri (and also had a home in Bordeaux, France). She died in Nova Scotia and is buried in the Bellefontaine Cemetery, St. Louis.

Her sister Isabel Austen gave Zoe's home to the people of Chester to be used as a library in memory of Zoé. The Chester branch of the Women's Institute of Nova Scotia ran the library in her home for over 50 years. The library has a history of notable supporters. The library was neglected from 1978 until it was researched and restored in 1994. The library remains open to the public. On the grounds of the library are an extensive flower garden and the Chester Trust Lightfoot Tower.

It now managed by the Village Commission in partnership with Shore Regional Libraries and additionally houses the administrative offices of the Village Commission in the area upstairs formerly used by the managers as their private residence.

== Supporters ==
- William Lyon Mackenzie King – prime minister of Canada
- Sir Christopher Ondaatje – author and business person
- John Grier Hibben – president of Princeton University
- Cyrus Eaton – philanthropist and business person
- John Gardner Murray – the sixteenth presiding bishop of the Episcopal Church
- Robert S. Brookings – married Zoe's niece

== See also ==
- List of historic places in Lunenburg County, Nova Scotia
