= St. Patrick's Church (Sydney, Nova Scotia) =

Church in Nova Scotia, Canada

- St. Patrick's Church Museum
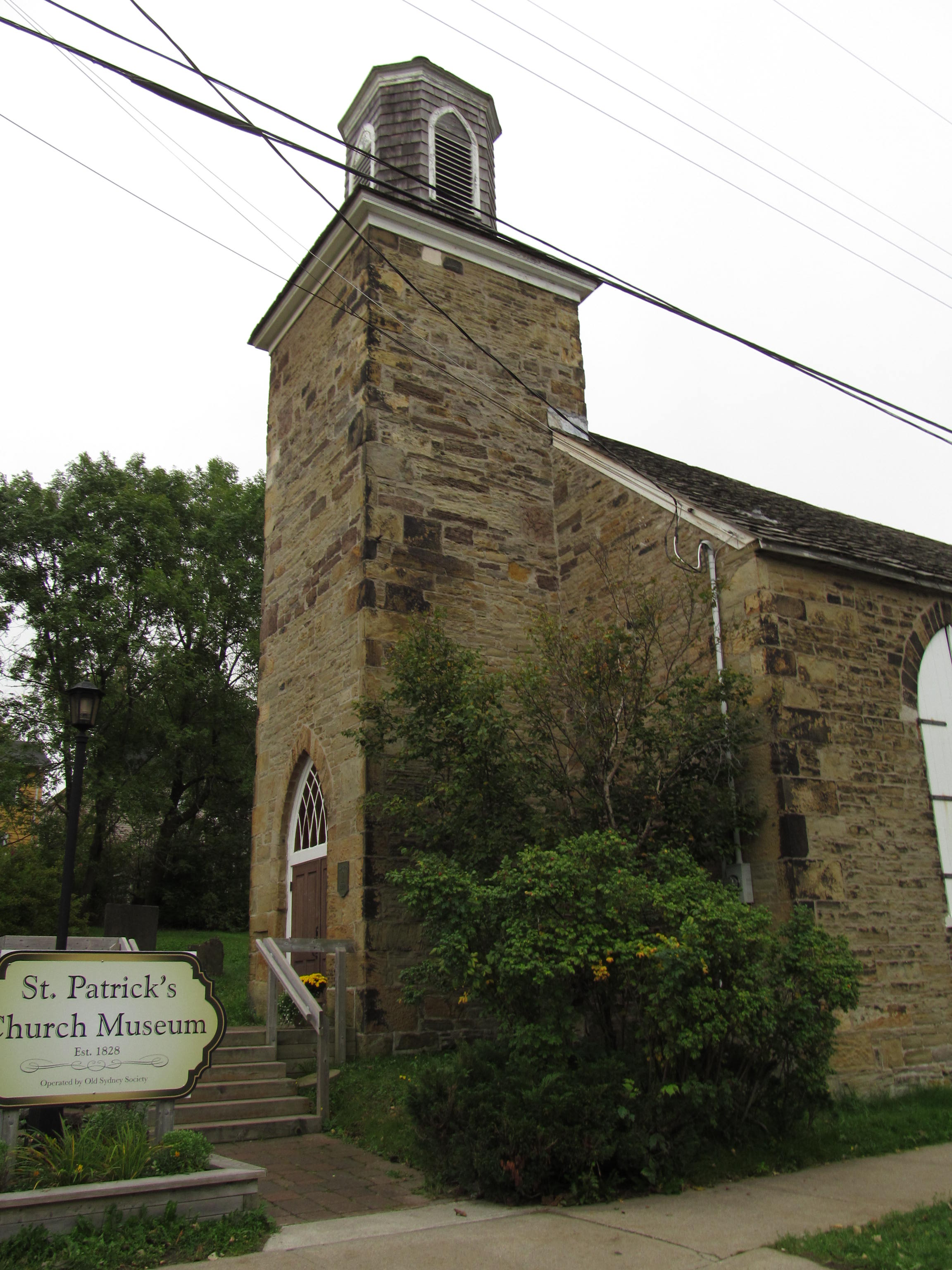
- St. Patrick's Church
- 46.1428°N 60.1987°W
- Location: 87 Esplanade, Sydney, Nova Scotia B1P 1A3
- Country: Canada
- Language: English
- Denomination: Catholic
- Website: www.oldsydneysociety.org/st-patricks-church-museum/

History
- Founded: 1828

Architecture
- Functional status: Museum
- Style: Gothic Revival
- Years built: 1828-1830
- Completed: 1830

Nova Scotia Heritage Property Act
- Type: Provincially Registered Property
- Designated: 1983-11-03
- Reference no.: 00PNS0003

St. Patrick's Church is a former Roman Catholic church in Sydney, Nova Scotia. The church was designated a Nova Scotian heritage property on November 3, 1983.

From 1912 to 1950, Sydney's Lebanese Maronite community used the church.

It is the oldest still-standing Roman Catholic church in Cape Breton, having been built in 1828.
