= Clotilda Douglas-Yakimchuk =

Canadian nurse (1932–2021)

Clotilda Douglas-Yakimchuk CM ONS
- Born: Clotilda Adessa Coward; January 11, 1932; Whitney Pier, Nova Scotia, Canada
- Died: April 15, 2021 (aged 89); Halifax, Nova Scotia, Canada
- Education: Nova Scotia Hospital School of Nursing; Saint Francis Xavier University
- Occupations: Nurse and activist
- Years active: 1954–1994
- Spouses: Benson T. Douglas (m. 1955; div. 1973); Dan Yakimchuk (m. 1984; died 2011)
- Children: 5
- Awards: Order of Canada; Order of Nova Scotia

Clotilda Adessa Douglas-Yakimchuk CM ONS (née Coward; January 11, 1932 – April 15, 2021) was a Canadian nurse. She was the first African-Canadian to graduate from the Nova Scotia Hospital School of Nursing and the first black president of the Registered Nurses’ Association of Nova Scotia.

== Early life and education ==
Clotilda Adessa Douglas-Yakimchuk was born Clotilda Adessa Coward in Whitney Pier, Nova Scotia, to Arthur and Lillian (Blackman) Coward. Growing up, her family dealt with racism while living in Whitney Pier. Her father was forced to quit his job at the steel plant due to discrimination, and her sister was unable to find a job.

In the early 1950s, Clotilda applied to various nursing schools, but never heard back and was never given a reason for her rejections. Clotilda believed that "they were not open readily, I think, to Black students at the time."

In 1954, Coward became the first black graduate of the Nova Scotia Hospital School of Nursing. She would later earn her post graduate psychiatric nursing certificate from the Nova Scotia Hospital. She earned her Diploma in Adult Education from Saint Francis Xavier University.

== Career ==
After earning her nursing qualifications, Coward Douglas began her career at the Nova Scotia Hospital as Head Nurse of the Admission/Discharge Unit. Shortly thereafter, Coward and her first husband Benson Douglas moved to Grenada, West Indies, where she served as a Director in a mental health hospital. This was also where she earned her post graduate midwifery diploma from Colony Hospital in Grenada, West Indies. By 1967, Coward Douglas moved back to Canada and accepted a position as Staff Nurse at the Sydney City Hospital. A few years later, she became the first black person to be elected president of the Registered Nurses Association of Nova Scotia. She encountered racial barriers, as after winning the election, a white woman, who was the runner-up asked Clotilda to move aside so she could be the president instead, but Clotilda refused to move aside. During this time, Douglas-Yakimchuk also founded the Black Community Development Organization (BCDO) and advocated for Cape Breton University to create a nursing degree program. The BCDO helped to provide housing for seniors and low-income families. She retired as director of education services at the Cape Breton Regional Hospital in Sydney in 1994. In addition to the racial barrier she faced during the presidency election, Clotilda also recalls an incident when one of her patients, believed that she was incapable of caring for her due to the colour of her skin.

== Activism ==
In Whitney Pier, Clotilda noticed the Black community was mainly living in poor conditions next to the steel plant, causing air pollution and tar ponds to form, which resulted in community members getting sick with cancer. She joined the Sierra Club of Canada because she noticed that many Black Canadians were not involved in environmentalism, despite the environmentally related illness existing within her community. Clotilda’s protests and demanding to the federal and provincial government that the ponds be cleaned, resulted in the government dedicating their money towards the cleaning of these ponds. Her campaigning also led her to meetings with ministers of the environment from Mexico and the United States.

== Personal life and death ==
After graduating from the NSHSN, Coward Douglas met and married Grenadian-born Benson T. Douglas in 1955, who wanted to return home to make a contribution after graduating at the top of his class in 1954 from Dalhousie University with an undergraduate degree in law. Together they had 5 children, Carl, Valerie, Kendrick, Sharon, and Leslie.

The couple later separated and Douglas went back to Grenada and became a judge before his death in January 1975.

In 1984 she married Dan Yakimchuk. They were married for 27 years until his death in March 2011.

After retiring, Douglas-Yakimchuk moved to Halifax, Nova Scotia, to be closer to her family. She died from COVID-19 in Halifax on April 15, 2021, at the age of 89, during the COVID-19 pandemic in Nova Scotia.

== Awards and honours ==
In 1991, Douglas-Yakimchuk was the recipient of the Harry Jerome Award for her cultural and community achievements. In 2003, she was appointed a Member of the Order of Canada. In 2010, she received her Honorary Doctor of Laws from Cape Breton University. In 2018, Douglas-Yakimchuk was appointed a Member of the Order of Nova Scotia.
