= Isaacs Harbour, Nova Scotia =

Community in Nova Scotia, Canada

Coordinates: 45°10′56.42″N 61°39′45.25″W

Isaacs Harbour in Nova Scotia

Isaacs Harbour is a small community in the Canadian province of Nova Scotia, located in the Municipality of the District of Guysborough in Guysborough County.

In 1861 gold was discovered in quartz veins on the Isaacs Harbour anticline to the east of the community in Goldboro, Nova Scotia. In 1892, Howard Richardson was the first to note gold within shale and quartz veins which became generally known as the Boston Richardson Belt. Mining on the property began in 1892 when the Richardson Gold Mining Company started developing the belt and continued until 1912.

At present Signal Gold Inc. is conducting an extensive exploration program for gold in the areas around Isaacs Harbour.
