= West Branch River John =

Community in Nova Scotia, Canada

Coordinates: 45°38′4″N 63°1′56″W

West Branch River John in Nova Scotia

West Branch River John is a community in the Canadian province of Nova Scotia, located in Pictou County.
