= Queensport, Nova Scotia =

Community in Nova Scotia, Canada

Coordinates: 45°20′19.08″N 61°15′58.02″W

Queensport in Nova Scotia

Queensport is a small community in the Canadian province of Nova Scotia, located in the Municipality of the District of Guysborough in Guysborough County. It is named for Queen Victoria. A lighthouse is still functioning on an island off the Queensport shore.

== See also ==
- Royal eponyms in Canada
