= Stormont, Nova Scotia =

Community in Nova Scotia, Canada

Coordinates: 45°13′17.61″N 61°44′7.74″W

Stormont in Nova Scotia

Stormont is a community in the Canadian province of Nova Scotia, located in the Municipality of the District of Guysborough in Guysborough County.
