= Salmon River Lake, Nova Scotia =

Community in Nova Scotia, Canada

Coordinates: 45°21′37.03″N 61°42′42.92″W

Salmon River Lake in Nova Scotia

Salmon River Lake is a small community in the Canadian province of Nova Scotia, located in the Municipality of the District of Guysborough in Guysborough County. It is situated at the eastern end of a lake by the same name.
