= Simpsons Corner =

Community in Nova Scotia, Canada

Coordinates: 44°32′6.67″N 64°47′3.54″W

Simpsons Corner in Nova Scotia

Simpsons Corner is a community in the Canadian province of Nova Scotia, located in Lunenburg County.
