= Hazel Hill, Nova Scotia =

Hazel Hill
- Community
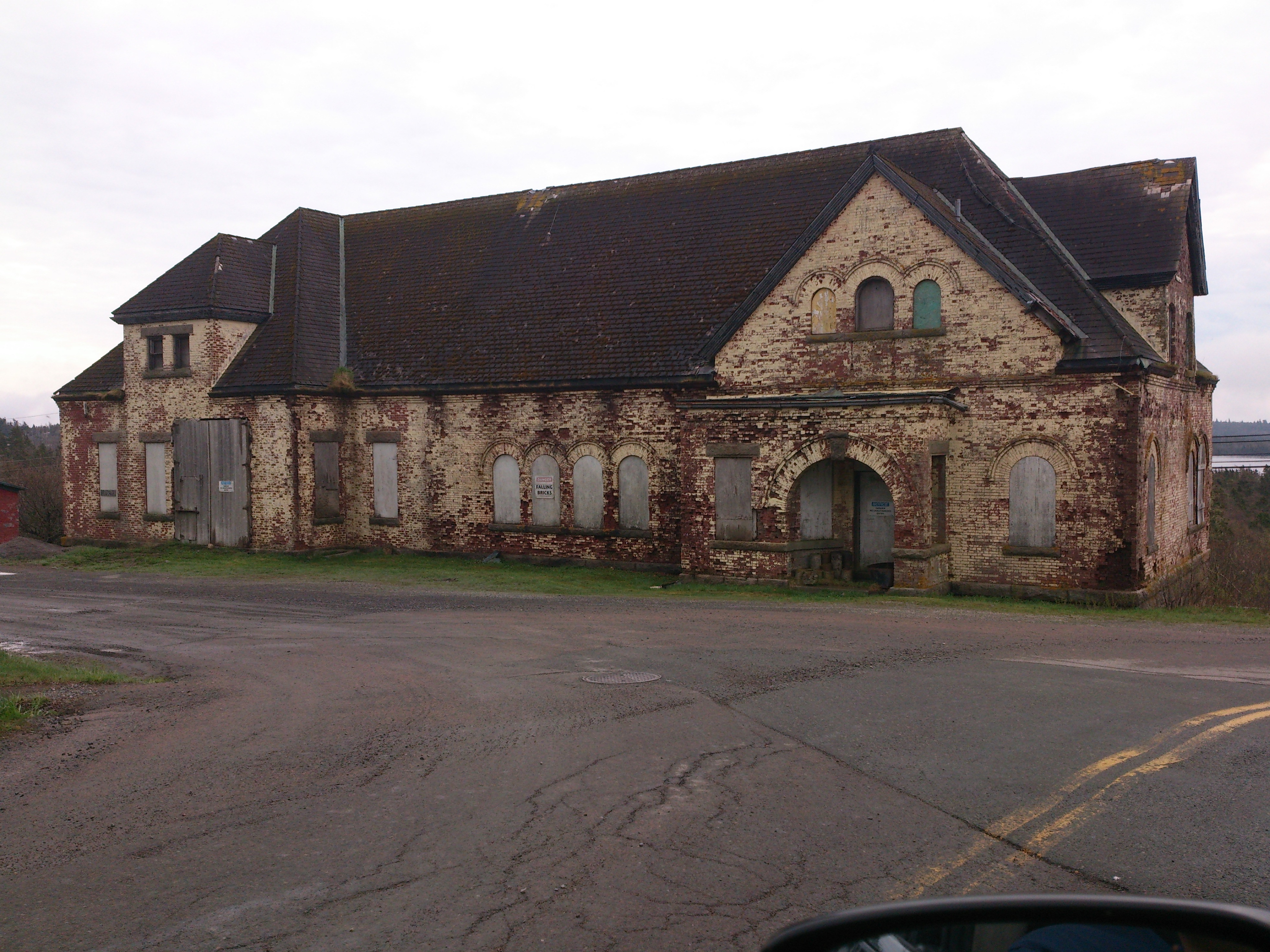
- Transatlantic Telegraph Cable Station

- Hazel Hill in Nova Scotia
- Coordinates: 45°19′28″N 61°1′51″W

Hazel Hill is a small community in the Canadian province of Nova Scotia in the Municipality of the District of Guysborough in Guysborough County.

Engineers and skilled workers were brought from England and a planned white-collar community was built, including stylish homes, a tennis court, a cricket field and a curling rink.

== Trans-Atlantic Telegraph Cable Station ==
Hazel Hill was chosen by the Commercial Cable Company in 1888 as the site for a trans-Atlantic cable station as it is the closest point of land in mainland North America to Europe. The station was housed in an imposing two-and-a-half storey brick and granite structure. The Hazel Hill trans-Atlantic cable station received a distress signal from the RMS Titanic on April 15, 1912, news concerning the end of World War I or Treaty of Versailles, and the Wall Street crash of 1929. It ceased operation in 1962 and due to its poor condition was set to be demolished in 2017.
