= Blue Rocks, Nova Scotia =

Community in Nova Scotia, Canada

Coordinates: 44°21′23.42″N 64°15′4.71″W

Blue Rocks in Nova Scotia

Blue Rocks is a community in the Canadian province of Nova Scotia, located in the Lunenburg Municipal District in Lunenburg County. It stands to seaward of Lunenburg, Nova Scotia, somewhat to the east. For many years a fishing village, it was discovered by many artists and photographers (including Joseph Purcell, William E. deGarthe, Jack L. Gray, Wallace R. MacAskill, E. Earle Bailly and others) beginning in the 1940s. Today the village boasts many artists, and there are also numerous guest houses to be found among the fishermen's dwellings.

Blue Rocks is known as one of the best kayaking spots on the South Shore of Nova Scotia.
