= Whitney Pier =

Neighbourhood in Nova Scotia, Canada

Coordinates: 46°09′35″N 60°11′05″W

Whitney Pier (2016 population: 4,612) is an urban neighbourhood in Sydney, Nova Scotia, Canada. Prior to the 20th century, this area was known as “Eastmount” or “South Sydney Harbour,” and had long been a fishing and farming district. It is a triangle-shaped area North of the Muggah Creek estuary running along the Eastern shore of Sydney Harbour.

Prior to Municipal amalgamation in 1995 which saw the formation of CBRM, Whitney Pier was a neighbourhood on the Northern boundary of the former City of Sydney.

Whitney Pier derives its name from Henry Melville Whitney, an American Industrialist who established the Dominion Coal Company (DOMCO) in the early 1890s and its subsidiary the Dominion Iron & Steel Company Ltd. (DISCO) in 1899. Sydney Steel Corporation (The Steel Plant) was completed in 1901.

The Development of Whitney Pier was designated as a National Historic Event in 2014.

== Geography ==
The geography of Whitney Pier is defined by its relationship to the heavy industries of coal mining and steel manufacturing. Whitney Pier was separated from Sydney's central business district by lands occupied by Sydney Steel Corporation, at one time Canada's largest integrated steel mill (no longer in business), as well as a large railway yard and tracks running from the harbour to coal mines in nearby New Waterford and Glace Bay.

The International Shipping Pier is located at the southern edge of the neighborhood, adjacent to the steel plant property, and is the current location for coal imports that feed the Lingan Generating Station, with the coal being hauled by the Sydney Coal Railway. From 1968–2001, the Cape Breton Development Corporation's Devco Railway hauled coal from coal mines northeast of Whitney Pier to this shipping pier for international export; the last coal mine in the area known as Industrial Cape Breton closed in November 2001, forcing the power plant to rely on coal imports for the first time.

From the 1880s to 1968, the Sydney and Louisburg Railway and its predecessors hauled coal from various coal mines to the shipping piers at this location; it was the owner of the S&L during the 1890s-1900s, Henry M. Whitney, who the community is named after - "the Whitney Pier".

The steel mill was responsible for the neighborhood's economic growth during the 20th century but it is also responsible for its economic decline as well. From the steel mill's inception in 1901 until the mid-1980s, the mill was fueled with coke, a byproduct of cooking raw coal over a multiple hour periods. To do this, coal was shipped by the Sydney & Louisburg Railway (and later the Devco Railway) from the mines to a large battery of coke ovens bordering the railway lines on the south side of the neighborhood along Frederick Street on a hill overlooking the steel mill. The coke ovens produced coke for the steel mill's oxygen blast furnaces 24 hours a day, 365 days a year for almost 90 years.

The resulting runoff of contaminants from the coke production, as well as general contaminants from the steel mill itself, drained into Muggah Creek, a tidal estuary that geographically separated the steel mill and Whitney Pier from Sydney's central business district.

After several decades of environmental reviews and scientific studies, the federal and provincial governments undertook a $400 million cleanup of the site which saw the industrial contaminants in the estuary contained through a stabilization and solidification process. Site remediation was carried out by Nova Scotia Lands Incorporated and Harbourside Commercial Park Inc., a Crown corporation formed to redevelop the site as a commercial and industrial estate. The cleanup was completed in 2013 with the opening of Harbourside Commercial Park and Open Hearth Park, which are situated on the site of the former Sydney Steel Corporation.

== Black community ==
Whitney Pier has been the primary settlement for Barbadians, and smaller numbers of African Americans and African Nova Scotians, in Cape Breton since 1901. In the 1920s, Garveyism and Pan-Africanism became popular among the 600 Afro-Caribbean and African Nova Scotian residents of Whitney Pier, resulting in establishments of the St. Philip's African Orthodox Church and the Universal Negro Improvement Association Hall. Whitney Pier's black community is distinguishable from other African Nova Scotian settlements, due to the largely Caribbean influence in the neighbourhood. Lines from the popular Bob Marley song "Redemption Song" were taken from a speech given by Marcus Garvey in Whitney Pier in October 1937, that was also published in his Black Man magazine:

We are going to emancipate ourselves from mental slavery because whilst others might free the body, none but ourselves can free the mind. Mind is your only ruler, sovereign. The man who is not able to develop and use his mind is bound to be the slave of the other man who uses his mind ...

A letter by Black leaders to the Prime Minister of Canada wrote about the community's success in the 1950's:

Many work in the mines, but there are three or four grocery stores, two taxi stands, a restaurant, a retread garage, a shoe-maker, chemist, doctor, school teachers, a few nurses and a dry-cleaning establishment. Sydney's [Black community], originally from the West Indies, provide an example of what other [Black people] can do and are doing throughout Canada.

Whitney Pier's population has dropped from over 8,000 in the 1920s to 4,612 in 2016. The neighbourhood's black population has also declined from a high of 600 in the 1920s, to 355 in 2016.

== Business district ==
The neighbourhood is centred along Victoria Road, stretching north from a railway overpass at the northern edge of the steel mill property through to a section of the road known as "Dead Man's Turn". Also, Whitney Pier Memorial Junior High, Harbourside Elementary School and Cape Breton Business College (CBBC) are the three schools that are located in Whitney Pier.

Victoria Road has been home to a variety of well known shops, restaurants, and community venues.

== Residents ==
Whitney Pier's residents can trace their ancestry to multiple ethnic backgrounds. The opening of the Sydney Steel Plant by the Dominion Steel Company in 1901 attracted many workers from The United States, all over Canada, the Caribbean, Croatia, Italy, Newfoundland, Poland, Ukraine, and many other places around the world to settle in the Pier.

Some of the residents in Whitney Pier can also trace their roots back to Black Loyalists.

Notable people from Whitney Pier include:

- Alvinus Calder
- Nathan Cohen
- Clotilda Douglas-Yakimchuk
- Carolyn Dunn
- Mayann Francis
- Danny Gallivan
- Gordie Gosse
- Frankie MacDonald
- J. Michael MacDonald
- Paul MacEwan
- Valerie Miller
- Isaac Phills
- Lisa Raitt
- Calvin Ruck

== Community events ==
In May, the Whitney Pier Society for the Arts organizes the PierScape Arts Festival showcasing art from dozens of Cape Breton artists across a variety of mediums. The festival also holds a number of art workshops and events for the public and recognizes distinguished artists, musicians, and contributors to the community.

The first week of August sees an annual neighborhood celebration called "Action Week". In recent years, this has consisted of events such as a memorial "fun run", street dances, a Caribbean festival, a baseball game, picnics, and various activities for children.
