= Middle River, Nova Scotia =

Community in Nova Scotia, Canada

Coordinates: 46°9′25″N 60°55′25″W

Middle River in Nova Scotia

Middle River is a small community in the Canadian province of Nova Scotia, located in Victoria County on Cape Breton Island. It is mentioned in Annie Dillard's poem, For the Time Being.

The original Mi'kmaq name was "Wagamatcook," or "Wokumutkook," meaning "little green water," elsewhere said to mean "somewhat cleaner."
