= Indian Point, Nova Scotia =

Community in Nova Scotia, Canada

Coordinates: 44°27′23.67″N 64°19′12.52″W

Indian Point in Nova Scotia

Indian Point is a community in the Canadian province of Nova Scotia, located in the Lunenburg Municipal District in Lunenburg County.
