= Heritage Property Act (Nova Scotia) =

Canadian provincial statute

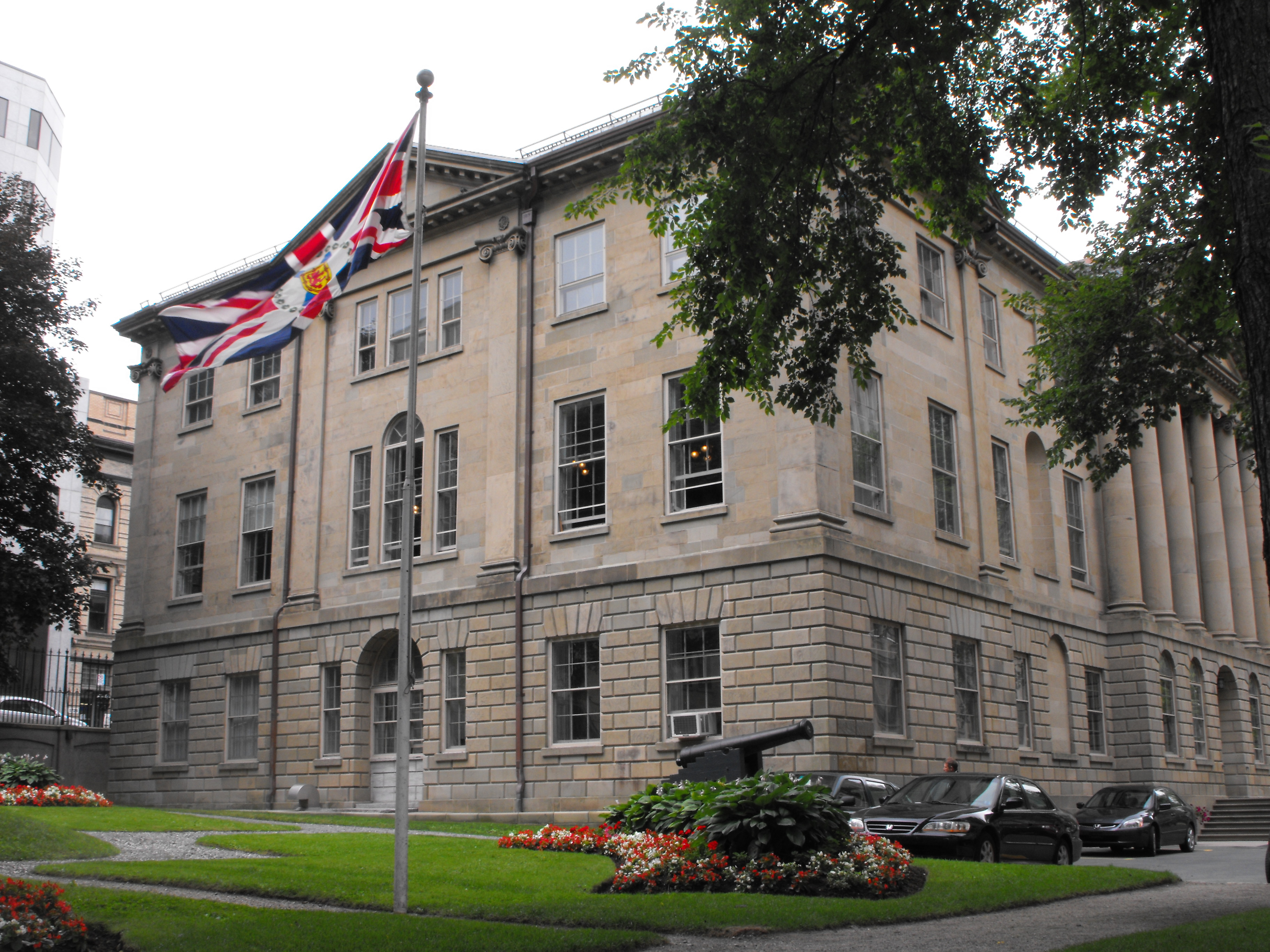
- Province House, where Nova Scotia's legislature meets, was designated a Provincially Registered Property under the Heritage Property Act in 1983

Nova Scotia House of Assembly
- Long title: An Act to Provide for the Identification, Preservation and Protection of Heritage Properties
- Citation: R.S. 1989, c. 199 (amendments 1991, c. 10; 1998, c. 18, s. 561; 2010, c. 54)
- Territorial extent: Nova Scotia
- Enacted by: Nova Scotia House of Assembly
- Enacted: 1980
- Status: Current legislation

The Heritage Property Act is a provincial statute which allows for the identification, protection and rehabilitation of cultural heritage properties in the Canadian province of Nova Scotia.

The Act offers five types of protection:

1. Provincial Registry of Heritage Properties (a list of properties designated by the provincial Minister of Communities, Culture and Heritage as possessing provincially significant heritage value);
2. Provincial Cultural Landscape (a cultural landscape listed on the Provincial Registry);
3. Municipal Registries of Heritage Properties (a list of properties which the local municipality has determined have a local or community level of heritage value);
4. Municipal Heritage Conservation Districts (a specific area within a municipality having unique heritage value and subject to regulations intended to ensure the preservation of the district's character while accommodating new development); and
5. Municipal Cultural Landscapes (a cultural landscape listed on a Municipal Registry).

The Heritage Property Act was first enacted in 1980, and was subject to amendments in 1991, 1998 and 2010.

Nova Scotia also has related legislation to protect archaeological and natural sites (the Special Places Protection Act) and to protect burial plots and cemeteries (the Cemeteries Protection Act).

== See also ==
- Heritage conservation in Canada
- List of historic places in Nova Scotia
- List of National Historic Sites of Canada in Nova Scotia
