= Cycling in Canada =

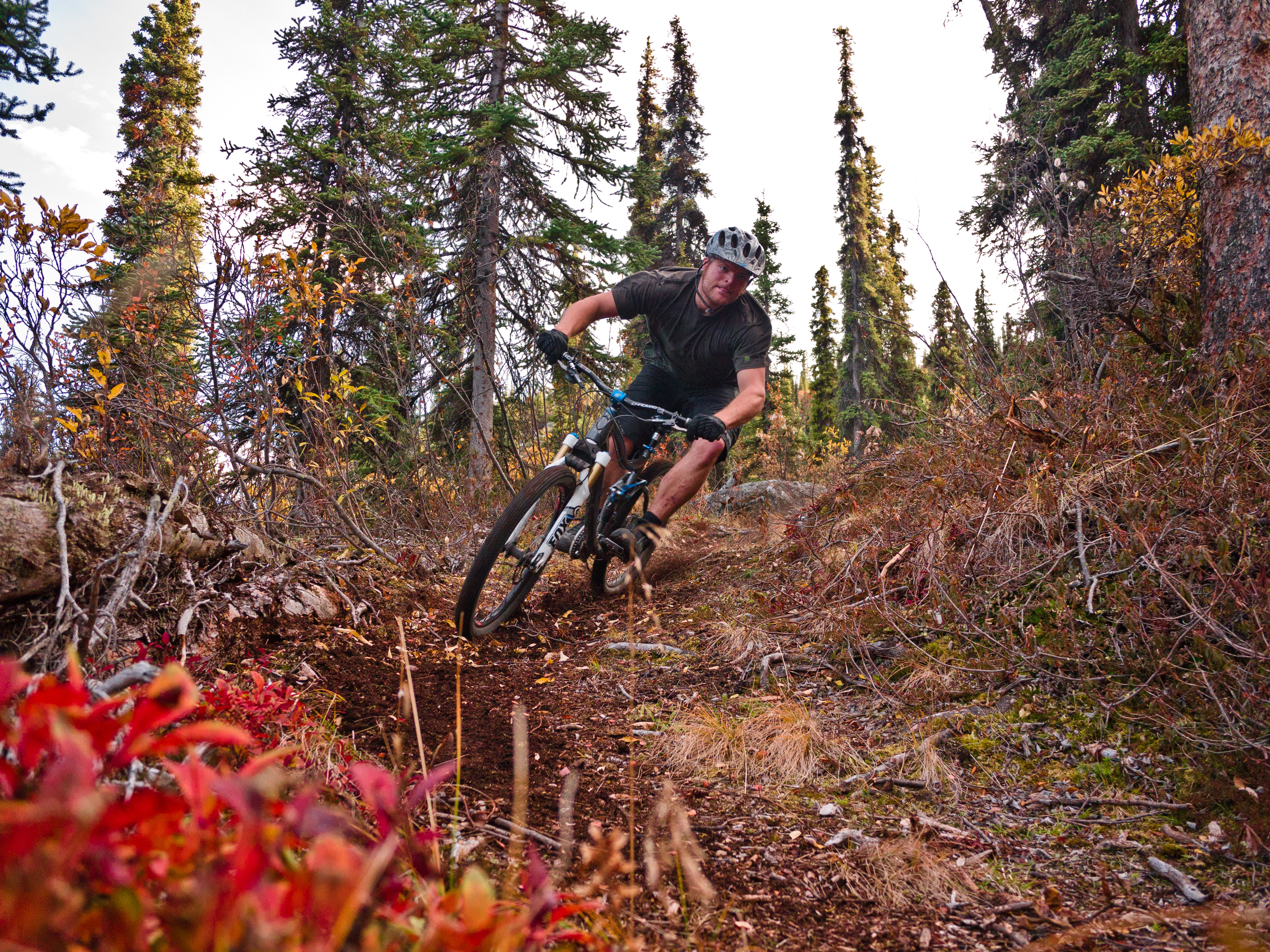
A mountain biker on Goat Mountain Bike Trail in the Yukon.

Cycling in Canada is experienced in various ways across a geographically huge, economically and socially diverse country. Among the reasons for cycling in Canada are for practical reasons such as commuting to work or school, for sports such as road racing, BMX, mountain bike racing, freestyle BMX, as well as for pure recreation. The amount and quality of bicycle infrastructure varies widely across the country as do the laws pertaining to cyclists such as bicycle helmet laws which can differ by province.

== History ==
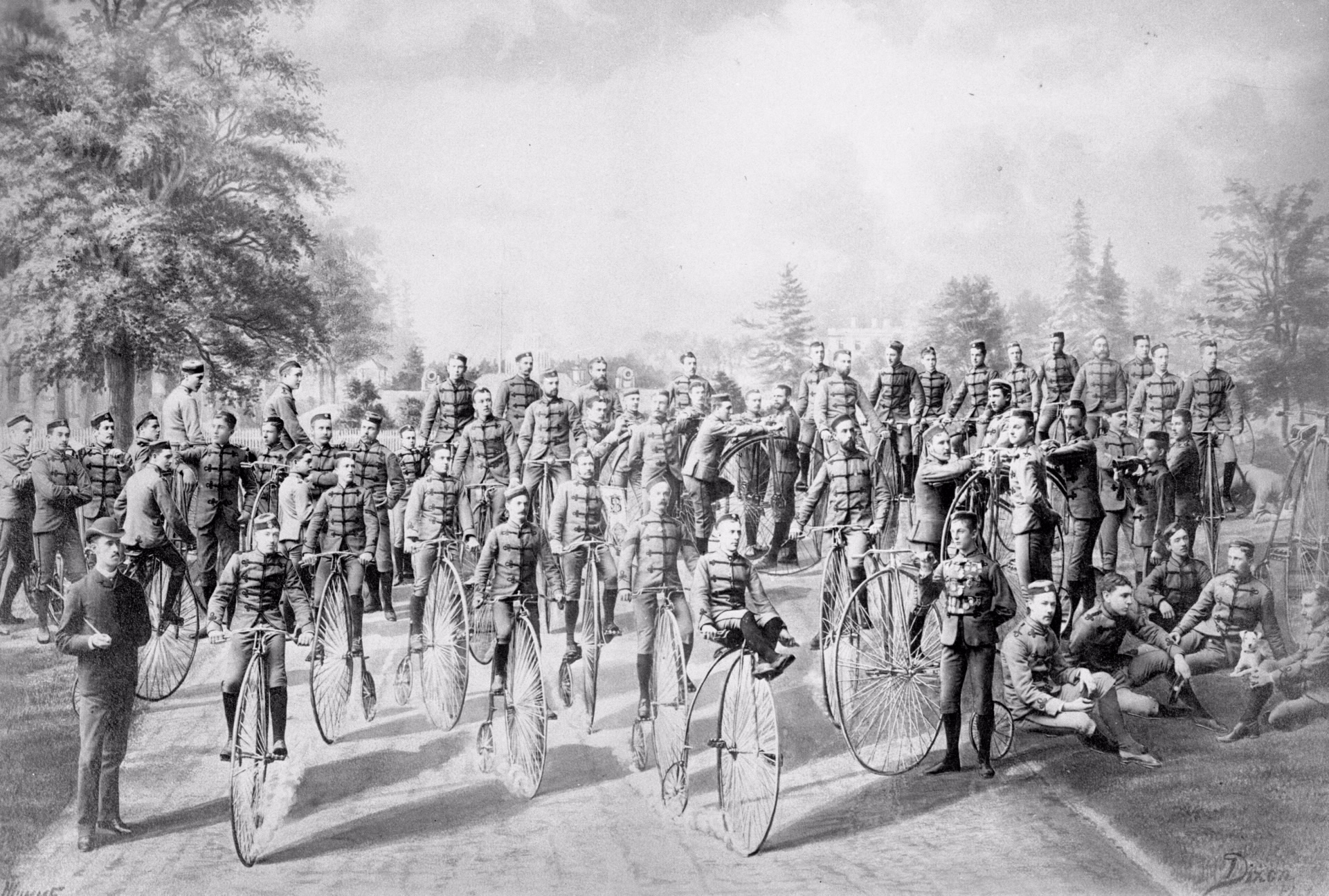
The Wanderer's Bicycle Club at Queen's Park, Toronto in 1884. Penny-farthings and safety bicycles were used in Canada as early as the late-19th century.

Interest in early Velocipede bicycles exploded during the winter of 1868–69 in Montreal, Quebec, Canada as evidenced by advertisements. The first person in North America to ride a penny-farthing style bicycle was Albert Lane who in Montreal rode an imported 50 inch Coventry on July 1, 1874. He also co-founded the first bicycle club in Canada, the Montreal Bicycle Club in 1878 which later joined with the Lacrosse and Snowshoe clubs to form the Montreal Amateur Athletic Association in 1881.

Some of the earliest commercial bicycle manufacturing in Canada took place in Ontario in the 1880s. One of the earliest manufacturers was Semmens, Ghent and Company of Burlington, Ontario, which began production as early as 1882. Homemade bicycles, however, are recorded as far back as the 1860s, and in 1878 it is recorded that Perry Doolittle (later the founder of the Canadian Wheelman's Association) had a wooden bicycle built for him. By the 1890s, bicycles were also being built by Massey-Harris Limited, a domestic agricultural machinery manufacturer, who based their bicycles on the Columbia bicycle that was being produced in the United States. Similarly, the Berlin and Racycle Manufacturing Company of Kitchener, Ontario (then known as Berlin) produced a Canadian copy of the Racycle under patent, a safety bicycle design being produced by the Middletown, Ohio-based Miami Cycle and Manufacturing Company.

Before the widespread adoption of private automobiles, bicycles were a popular mode of transport in Canada, although Canada's snowy winters posed a problem for year-round use. Travel by horse and carriage (or sled) or streetcar offered a more robust alternative. As Canada became more suburban after World War II, cars became the principal mode of transportation for many people, and cycling shifted to being solely for sport or recreation.

In the 1970s a bike boom saw a sharp increase of bicycle sales in Canada The advent of the mountain bike in the later twentieth century made off-road recreational bicycling particularly popular.

In the twenty-first century, with longer and longer commute times between suburbs and central business districts, there has been a trend towards urbanization, with people moving into cities. together with gentrification, this has created a more dense urban environment less like the mid-century North American norm and more like Old World cities where cycling commuting is more popular. This has led to a new era of cycling advocacy and can create conflicts with motorists over road space prioritization, funding and planning decisions at the local municipality level.

== Commuter cycling ==
Bicycle commuting to work has grown in popularity due to a grassroots cycling advocacy movement across Canada along with improvements to bicycling infrastructure in cities. Bicycling infrastructure has an impact on the perception of risk and safety which may impact the likelihood that people will commute or travel for regular trips by bicycle.

=== Top Commuting by Bicycle Census Metropolitan Areas in Canada ===
Census Year	Census Metropolitan Area	% Commuting by Bicycle	% Men+ Commuting by Bicycle	% Women+ Commuting by Bicycle
2021	Victoria	5.3	6.4	4.2
2021	Kelowna	2.0	2.1	1.8
2021	Vancouver	1.9	2.2	1.5
2021	Montréal	1.8	2.1	1.4
2021	Nanaimo	1.3	1.7	0.8
2021	Ottawa-Gatineau	1.3	1.6	0.9
2021	Canada	1.1	1.3	0.8
2016	Victoria	6.6	8.1	5.0
2016	Kelowna	2.7	3.2	2.1
2016	Ottawa-Gatineau	2.4	3.1	1.6
2016	Vancouver	2.3	2.9	1.7
2016	Montréal	2.0	2.5	1.5
2016	Saskatoon	2.0	2.3	1.6
2016	Canada	1.4	1.8	1.0
2011	Victoria	5.9	-	-
2011	Kelowna	2.6	-	-
2011	Kingston	2.2	-	-
2011	Ottawa-Gatineau	2.2	-	-
2011	Winnipeg	2.0	-	-
2011	Saskatoon	2.0	-	-
2011	Canada	1.3	-	-
2006	Victoria	5.6	-	-
2006	Kingston	2.4	-	-
2006	Saskatoon	2.4	-	-
2006	Peterborough	2.3	-	-
2006	Guelph	2.2	-	-
2006	Canada	1.3	-	-
+ symbol includes non-binary, due to lower volumes some are included in 'men+' or 'women+' with a '+' to denote this and maintain privacy. See Statistics Canada census "Note: Gender" for more info.

For the 2016 Census Journey to Work data noted that the number of people living in Census Metropolitan Areas commuting by bicycle has increased by 87.9 percent, which is more than twice the pace of overall commuter growth. Canada's overall percent of bicycle commuters from the 2016 census was 1.4 percent.

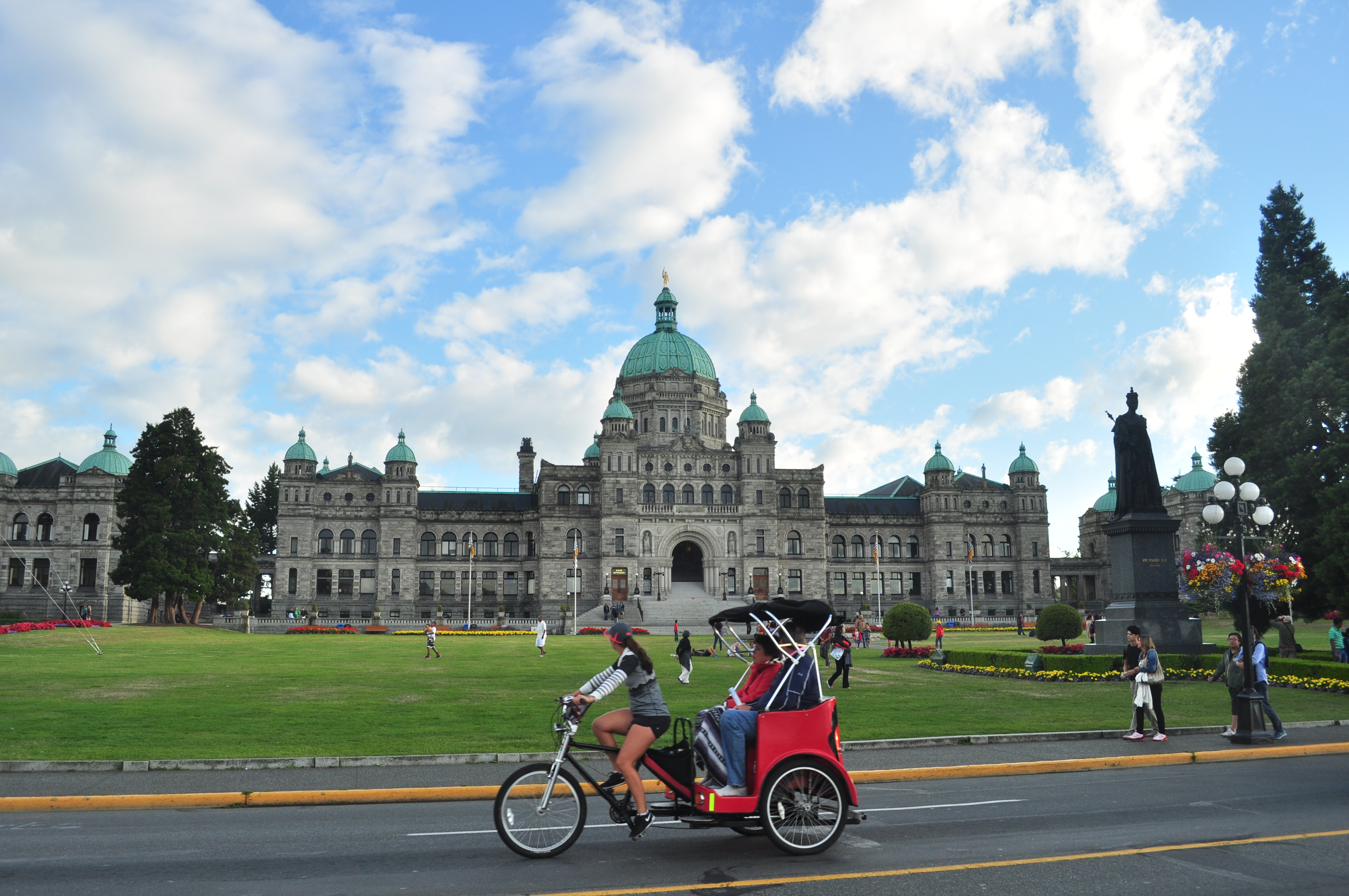
According to the Canada 2016 Census, Victoria holds the largest percentage of bike commuters out of any municipality in Canada.

Victoria has a very mild climate year-round compared to the rest of Canada which may help explain why the proportion of cycling commuters is so much higher, coupled with a compact core, regional trails connecting suburbs to the downtown, a growing protected bicycle lane infrastructure, and a strong bicycle culture. Victoria is home to one of Canada's earliest Bike to Work events that has grown into the popular bicycle commuting campaign in British Columbia known as Go by Bike BC (formerly Bike to Work Week BC) which occurs in May, October and February each year and pits workplace and school based teams in friendly competition with other teams in their community for a variety of prizes.

In Toronto, the country's largest city, and the city with the longest average commutes in all of North America, cycle-commuting has quickly gained popularity. In 2010, however, Toronto had the highest per capita rate of bike-car collisions of any Canadian city and bike activists have demanded more bike lanes to make cycling safer. This was derided as "the war on the car" by successful mayoral candidate Rob Ford in the 2010 election. He was supported by media personality Don Cherry's rant against "the pinkos out there who ride bicycles" at Ford's inauguration. In July 2011, Toronto City Council voted to remove three of the bike lanes added by the previous council and most were removed the following year, the Jarvis bike lane was removed by Fall 2012 despite protesters. However, Toronto is not the only city in Canada to grapple with cyclist-motorist conflicts driven by unsafe or non-existent infrastructure for cycling.

== Recreational cycling ==
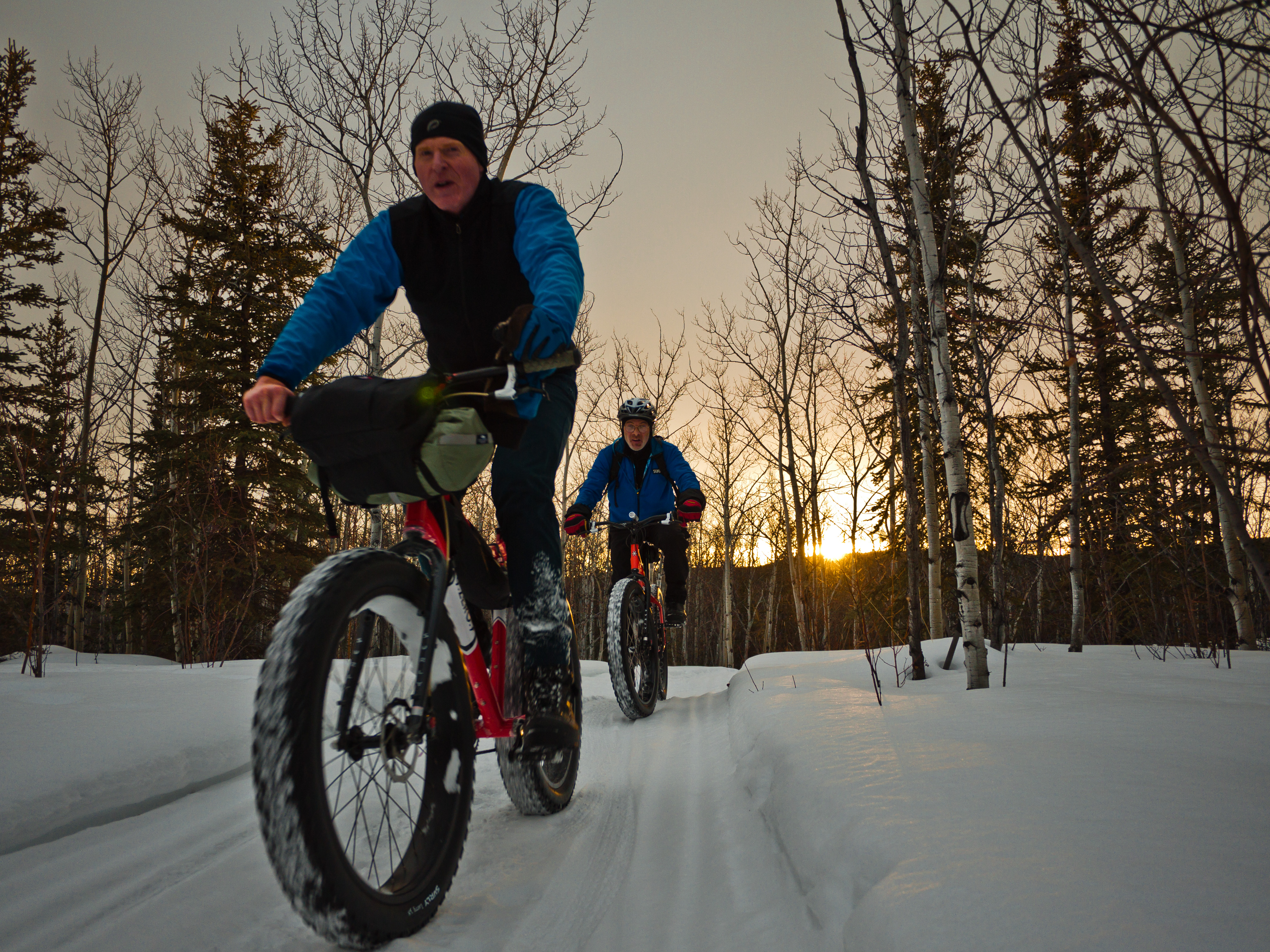
Cycling along the Trans Canada Trail in the Yukon. The Trans Canada Trail is a mixed-used path that extends throughout the country.

The bicycle-friendliness for cycling in Canada varies considerably by region. There are thousands of kilometers of bike lanes or paths in Canadian cities. Many multi-use trails connect cities and suburbs on old railway right of ways, known as rails to trails. Rural bicycling is quite popular in less-remote areas using the many low-traffic rural roads or wide shoulders on rural roads. A long distance multi-use trail that will have many sections for cycling, is slated to be completed in 2017, see Trans Canada Trail. There are also predetermined recreational cycle routes such as the Golden Triangle. It is not uncommon to see people cycling across Canada on the shoulder of the Trans Canada Highway. Most of Canada's northern landmass completely lacks any bicycle infrastructure.

In comparison to Europe, Canadian cities are not very bike friendly. Canadian cars and trucks are larger with more blind spots that prevent drivers from safely seeing cyclists and pedestrians. Cities also have higher speed limits and urban highways travel in or near the core of many cities. There is also many on-street parking which can present more door zone hazards for cyclists and many Canadian cities have only begun to build more protected bike lanes in the last several years. Consequently, some inexperienced cyclists will use a "pedestrian" style of riding where no cycling facilities exist in order to feel safer such as by riding on the sidewalk, rather than on the roadway. Although cycling on the sidewalks is not allowed in many Canadian cities – as bicycles are often deemed to be vehicles under the laws of all provinces – it is a common cycling method in small town and suburban Canada (where pedestrians on sidewalks are rare). Canadian cycling advocates typically favour cycling facilities like bike paths and protected bike lanes that provide a buffer between motor vehicles and cyclists. Protected bike lanes or cycle tracks have been adopted in strategic corridors in Montreal, Vancouver, Toronto, Calgary, Edmonton, Saskatoon, Victoria and Ottawa with plans to add protected bike lanes in many other cities across the country wanting to increase rates of active transportation.

In 2011, the province of Nova Scotia passed a law requiring all motor vehicles to give cyclist 1 metre (3 ft 3 in) of clearance to protect people riding on the shoulder. The narrow streets of Downtown Halifax were originally designed for horse, cart and bicycle and they thus require drivers to share the road with a mix of other users. The city is small and reasonably easy to navigate by bicycle as infrastructure is gradually improved each year.

== Sport cycling ==
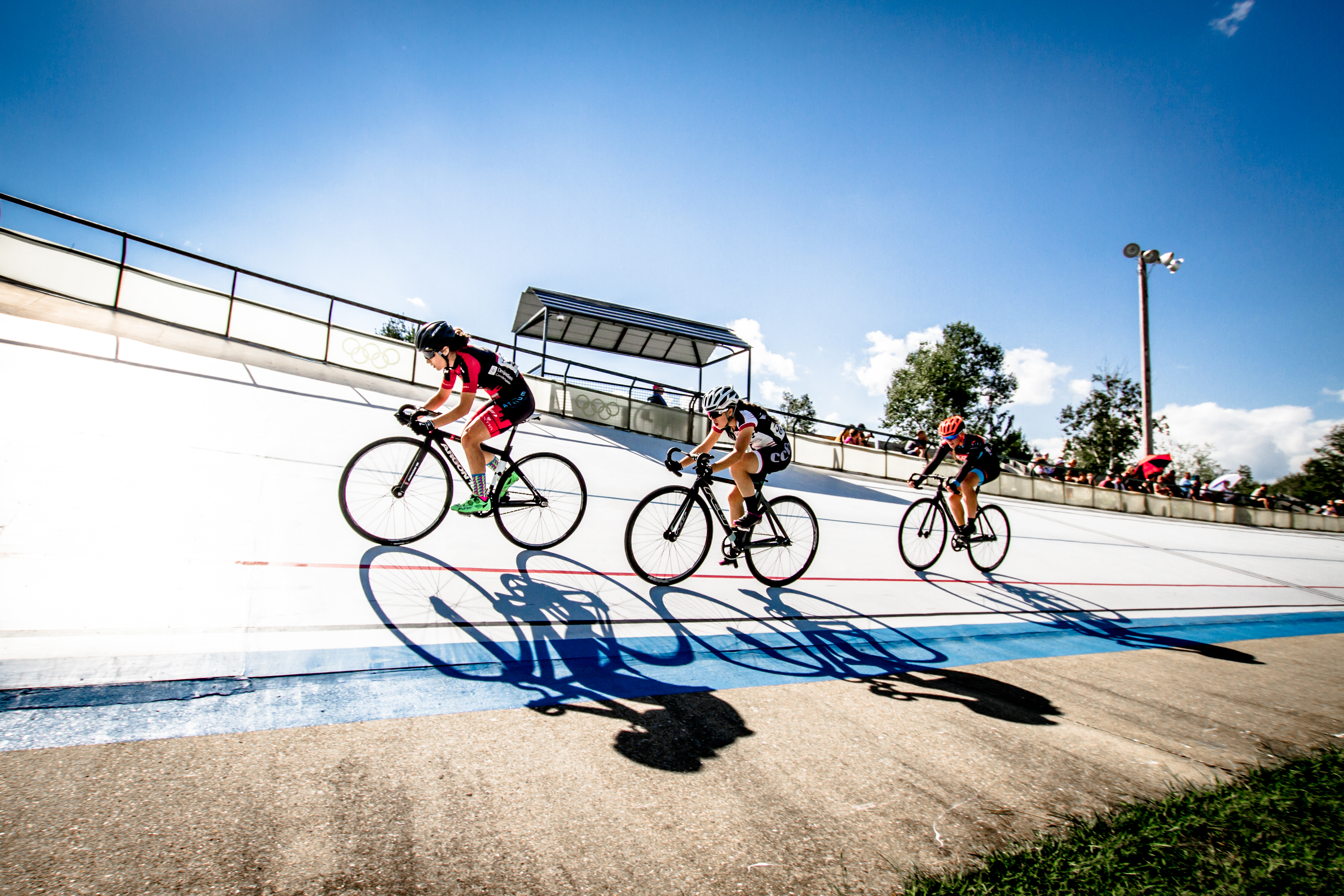
Quebec Track Championship at Gaétan Boucher Oval in Quebec City.

Sport cycling is a minority sport in Canada. Various disciplines are practiced across the country to different degrees. In Quebec older, disciplines like road racing and track cycling are popular, although they also have smaller following in English Canada). Newer "extreme" disciplines like bicycle motocross, cross-country cycling, downhill mountain biking and freeride are relatively popular in areas with the appropriate facilities. Many ski hills and resorts in Canada are converted to downhill biking in the summer months. Mountain biking in British Columbia is quite popular, in particular freeride originated on the North Shore near Vancouver.

Two Canadians have been Olympic gold medalists in cycling: Lori-Ann Muenzer, who won the Women's sprint in Athens in 2004, and Kelsey Mitchell, who won the same event at the 2020 Tokyo Games. Canada's first winner of one of road racing's three most prestigious Grand Tours was Ryder Hesjedal in 2012. Two Canadians have worn the yellow jersey in the Tour de France: Alex Stieda (who led the race in 1986) and Steve Bauer (who won the opening stage of the 1988 Tour - the first Tour stage win for a Canadian - led the race for five days, and eventually finished fourth overall). Bauer was also the first Canadian to win an Olympic medal in road racing, finishing second in the road race at the 1984 Summer Olympics in Los Angeles, before taking a bronze at the Road World Championships in Barcelona later that year. At the 2022 Tour de France, Hugo Houle became the second Canadian winner of a Tour stage, 34 years after Bauer, who guided Houle to the win as his team's directeur sportif.

== Cycling by area ==
The amount of purpose-built cycle facilities varies widely across Canada. Planning and construction of bike lanes is done by municipal governments who often rely on grants or funding for bicycle infrastructure from the provincial and federal government.

=== Alberta ===
==== Calgary ====
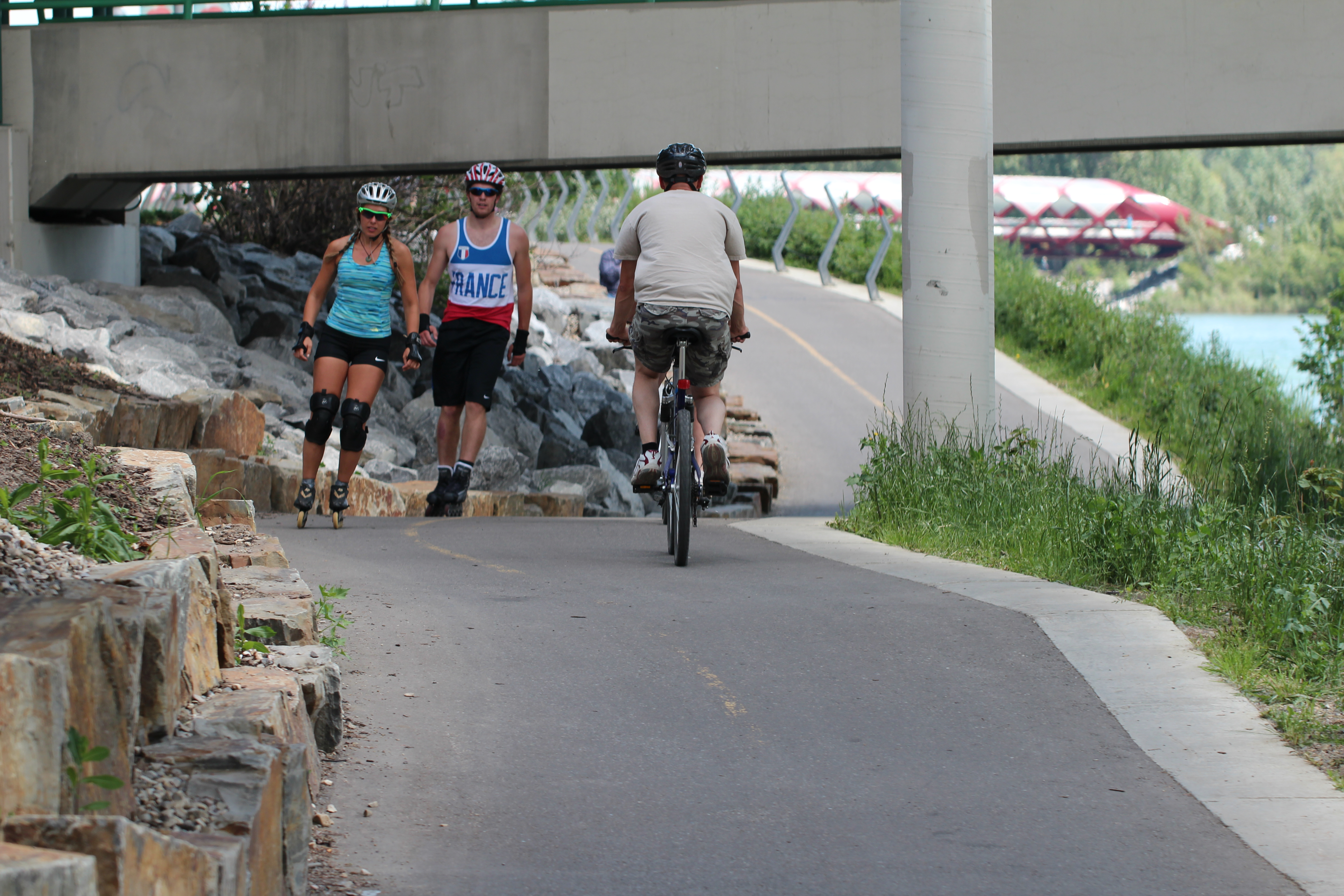
Calgary operates a number of bike facilities, including a number of mixed-use pathways.

Calgary's report showed that from 1999 to 2010, there consistently were 9,200 weekday cycling trips entering or leaving the CBD. In 2010, Calgary had 712 kilometers of multi-use pathways and 355 kilometers of on-street bikeways, 328 kilometers of which were signed bikeways and 27 kilometers of which were bikeways with pavement marking — bike lanes and marked shared lanes.

In 2015, Calgary has launched a strategic protected bicycle infrastructure plan that has been lauded for its ambition by cycling advocacy organization People for Bikes.

==== Edmonton ====
Edmonton presently operates 117 km of on-street bike routes (12 km of marked bike lanes, 105 km of signed but unmarked bike routes), plus 275 km of routes shared with pedestrians (including sidewalks and 160 km of paved multiuse trails), and 450 km of unpaved trails; 500 km of new bike lane and paths is planned to be added from 2009 to 2019.

=== British Columbia ===
The province of British Columbia offers Active Transportation Infrastructure Grants for indigenous and local governments to fund network planning and infrastructure for all ages and abilities active transportation projects.

==== Vancouver ====
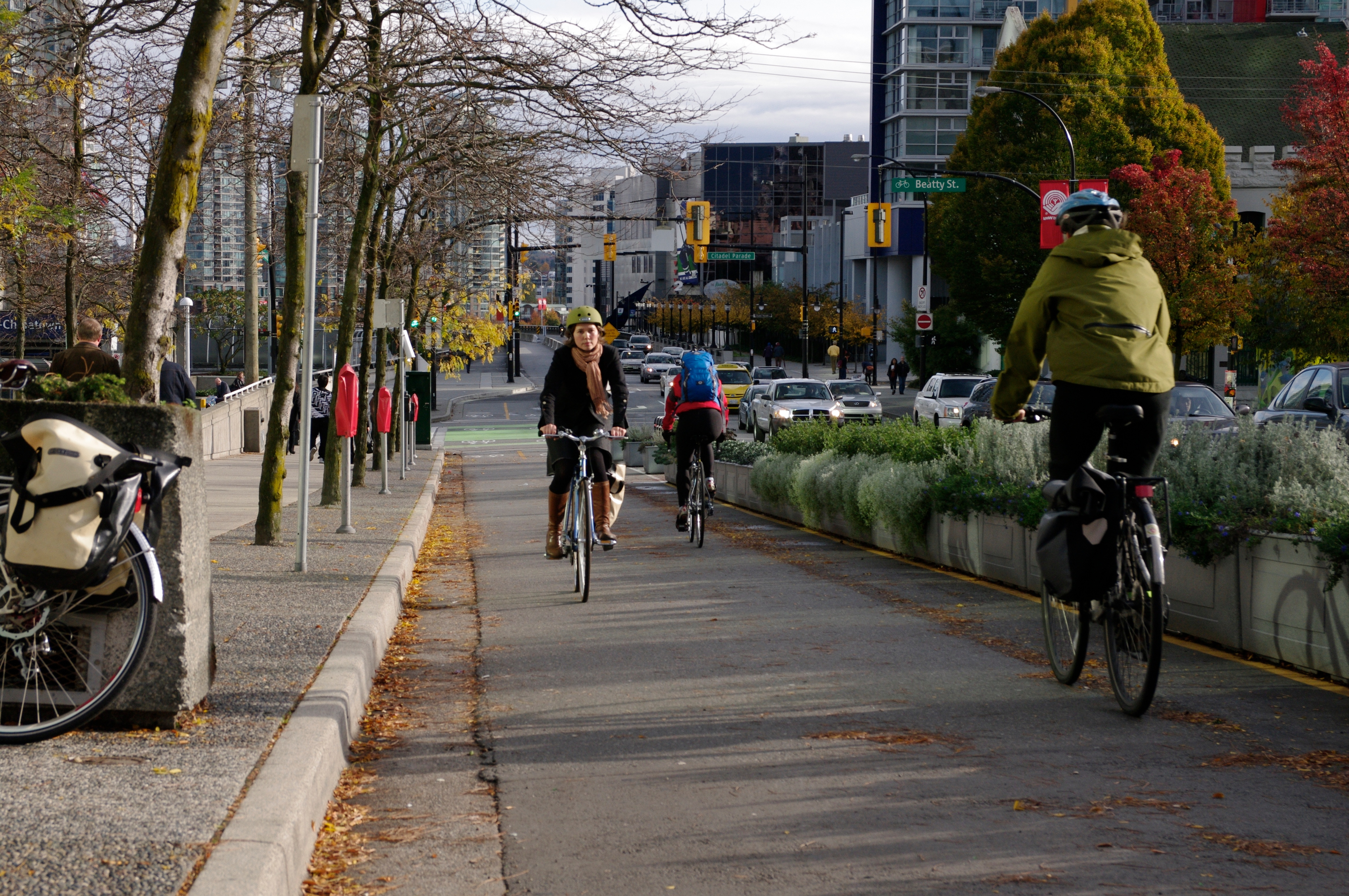
In Vancouver, protected bike lanes are typically separated from traffic by self-watering planters with plants.

Vancouver operates a total of 400 km total bikes routes, of which 330 km are on-street bike lanes. The municipal government plans to upgrade or build 23 biking routes between 2018 and 2022. Cycling is the fastest growing mode of transportation in Vancouver. Translink data indicates that cycling has increased by 40 percent in Vancouver between 2008 and 2011.

Statistics collected show that the protected bike lanes serve thousands of cyclists every month, even in the wet winter months. Over 1 out of 8 of its lanes, bikeways and paths was a separated lane. Many of Vancouver's protected bike lanes are separated from traffic by self-watering planters that feature hardy plants that can withstand the wet winters and dry summers. The Downtown Vancouver Business Improvement Association initially did not support the separated bike lanes that were installed on Hornby and Dunsmuir streets but have since come to accept them, noting that businesses have adapted and the lanes bring a lot of people to the area.

Vancouver promotes cycling to events in the city by suggesting bicycle valet services to event organizers. These bicycle valet services that are usually no cost for cyclists but corral bikes for event coordinators while providing bike owners with a secure place to store their bike under watchful volunteers while they visit the event.

In summer 2016 Vancouver started its own bicycle-sharing system known as Mobi by Shaw Go. Mobi faced initial planning challenges with the province of British Columbia's mandatory helmet law that is required for all ages and the placement of docking stations away from existing bike rental locations that cater to tourists.

==== Victoria ====
Victoria has the highest rate of commuters who bicycle to work in Canada. This may be in part due to a mild year-round climate, a relatively flat and compact core and separate municipalities for the suburban areas resulting in perhaps less animosity towards dedicated infrastructure for cycling. The city has 41 km of bike lanes with 775 km in the Capital Regional District. Victoria's regional trails connect the downtown core with suburban municipalities along the Galloping Goose Regional Trail, Lochside Regional Trail and the E&N Rail Trail. The Galloping Goose Regional Trail in the Vic West neighbourhood has a bike barometer that automatically counts daily cyclist activity along the popular multi-use and cycling commuter trail.

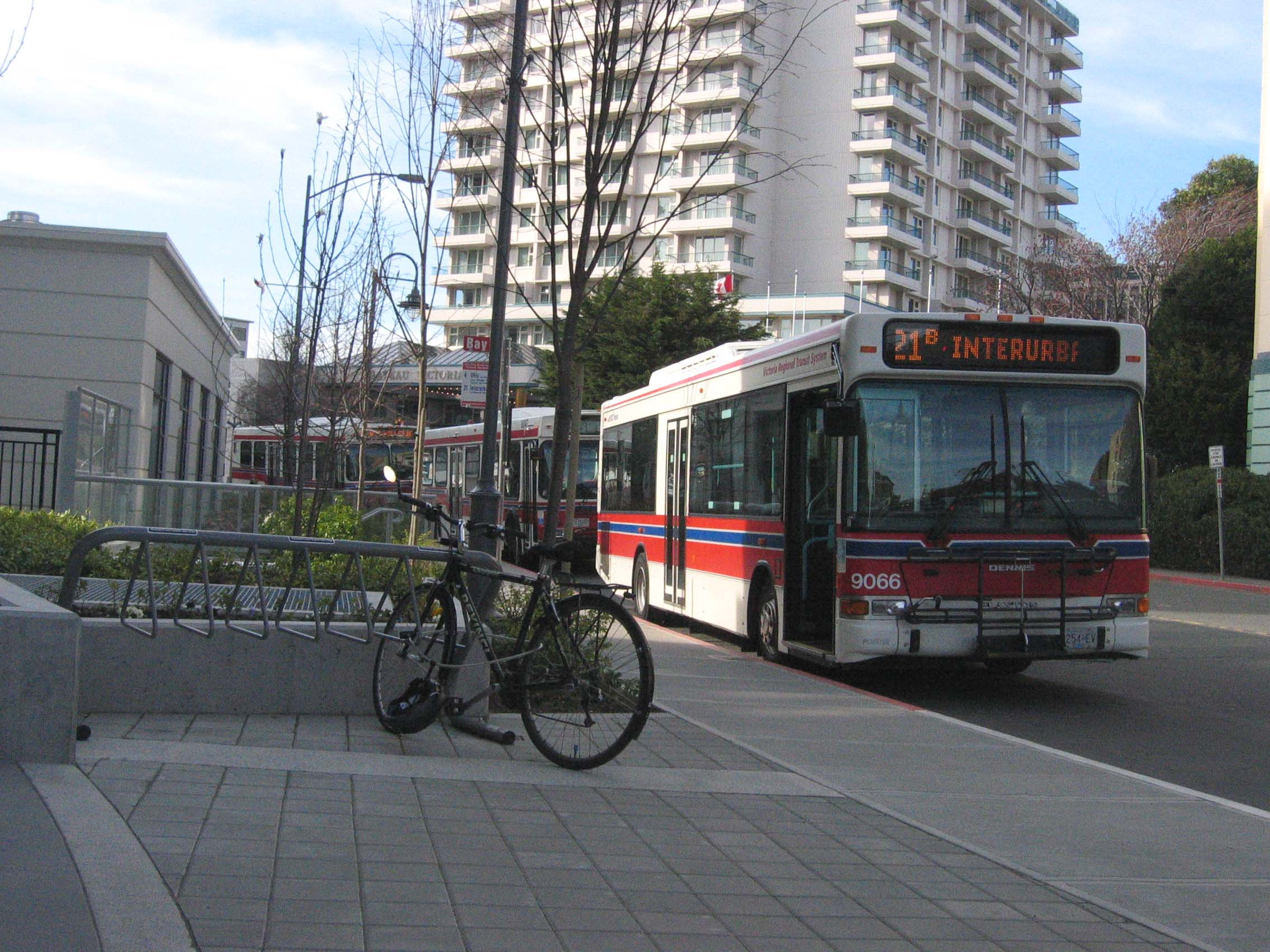
All Victoria Regional Transit buses have front bicycle carriers which are capable of carrying two bicycles.

In 2017 Victoria started building a planned 32 km all ages and abilities (AAA) bike network within the core of the city with a timeline to complete most of the network by the end of 2022. The AAA bike network in Victoria is meant to provide safe cycling facilities within 500m of where 95% of residents live. Cook Street was initially planned as part of the north–south route but faced neighbourhood resident and business opposition so the city opted to move the bike route to parallel Vancouver street. In contrast, downtown merchants where protected bike lanes have been installed are overwhelmingly positive after the construction of the protected bike lanes on Pandora avenue and Fort street.

In addition to bike lane infrastructure, Victoria has supported and implemented measures to make biking easier in the city. All Victoria Regional Transit buses have front racks that can accommodate two bicycles. Bicycle lockers are available at some park and ride bus stop locations and can be reserved through Capital Bike (formerly the Greater Victoria Cycling Coalition). Victoria has updated the off-street parking bylaw to require more bicycle parking for new developments and is proposing that at minimum, half of all new long-term bicycle parking must be in-ground racks for greater accessibility. In June 2022 Victoria piloted for the summer the opening of a secure downtown bicycle valet parking. The bicycle valet parking pilot operated until early November 2022 and in that time over 11,000 bicycles were parked in the secure area and over 750 bikes were registered with Project 529 by bike valet staff.

=== Manitoba ===
==== Winnipeg ====
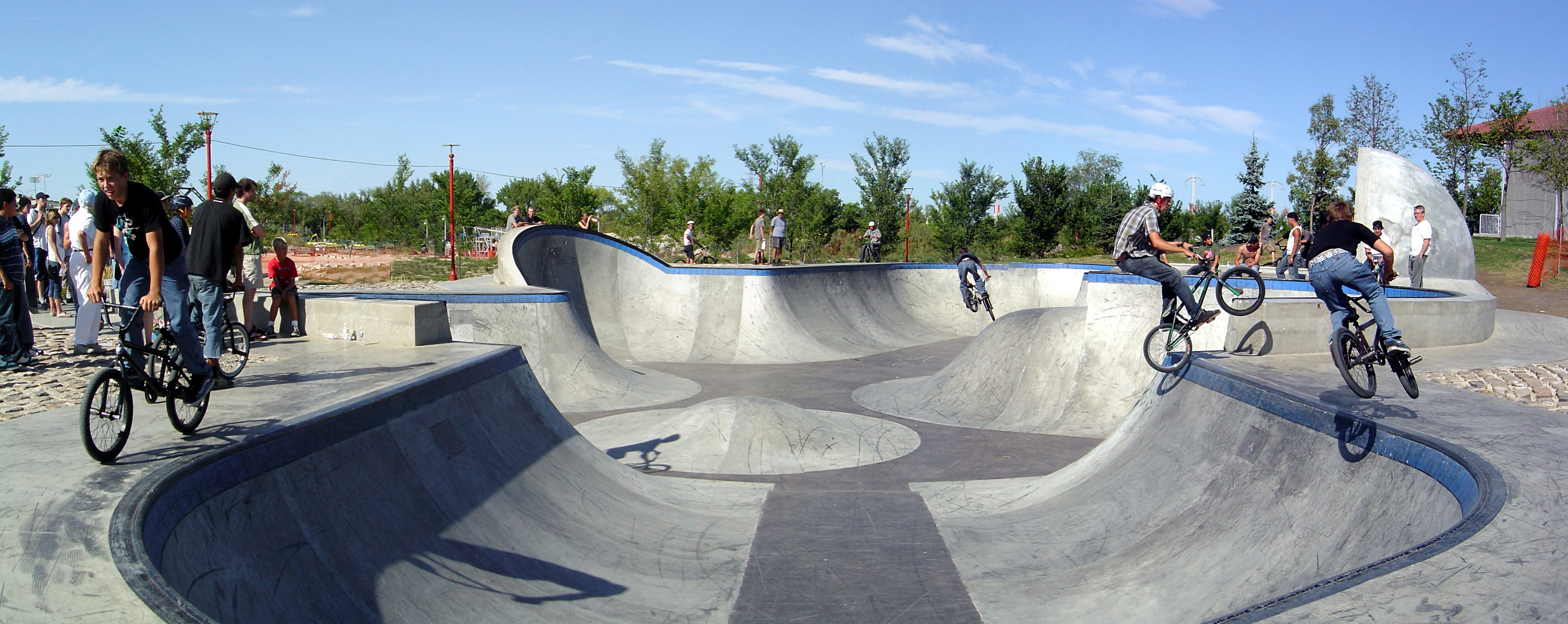
BMX bikers at a skatepark in The Forks, Winnipeg.

Winnipeg maintains a total of 149 km of bike lanes, including 13 km of bike-only road routes, with plans for 375 km of active transportation routes, which includes multi-use pathways, neighbourhood pathways bike lanes, sharrows and bike boulevards.

=== New Brunswick ===
==== Moncton ====
The city of Moncton has developed an active transportation plan to install some physically separated bike lanes by 2027. Separated bike lanes were recommended by city staff to council for Mountain Road between Wheeler Boulevard and Killam Drive by 2027, with a further extension on Mountain Road between West Lane and St. George Street to be completed sometime between 2028 and 2032. Shorter term separated bike lanes are planned along St. George Street, portions of Queen Street, Shediac Road, Elmwood Drive, Mapleton Road and Morton Avenue.There is also a longer term plan to add separated bike lanes on Salisbury road.

==== Saint John ====
The city of Saint John has plans to add buffered bike lanes on University avenue, and protected bike lanes on a northern section of Main street. A plan to develop detailed design work for Main street was approved by city council in May 2022 and will include a road diet that will allow the road to be narrowed and protected bike lanes added. Funding from the province will likely be required to build the protected bike lane on Main street.

=== Newfoundland and Labrador ===
==== St. John's ====
As of 2016, St. John's had 208 kilometres (129 miles) of active transportation facilities including 175 kilometres of multi-use trails (of the Grand Concourse) and 33 kilometres of on-street bike lanes.

=== Nova Scotia ===
Nova Scotia is connecting bike routes throughout the province with the Blue Route.

==== Halifax ====
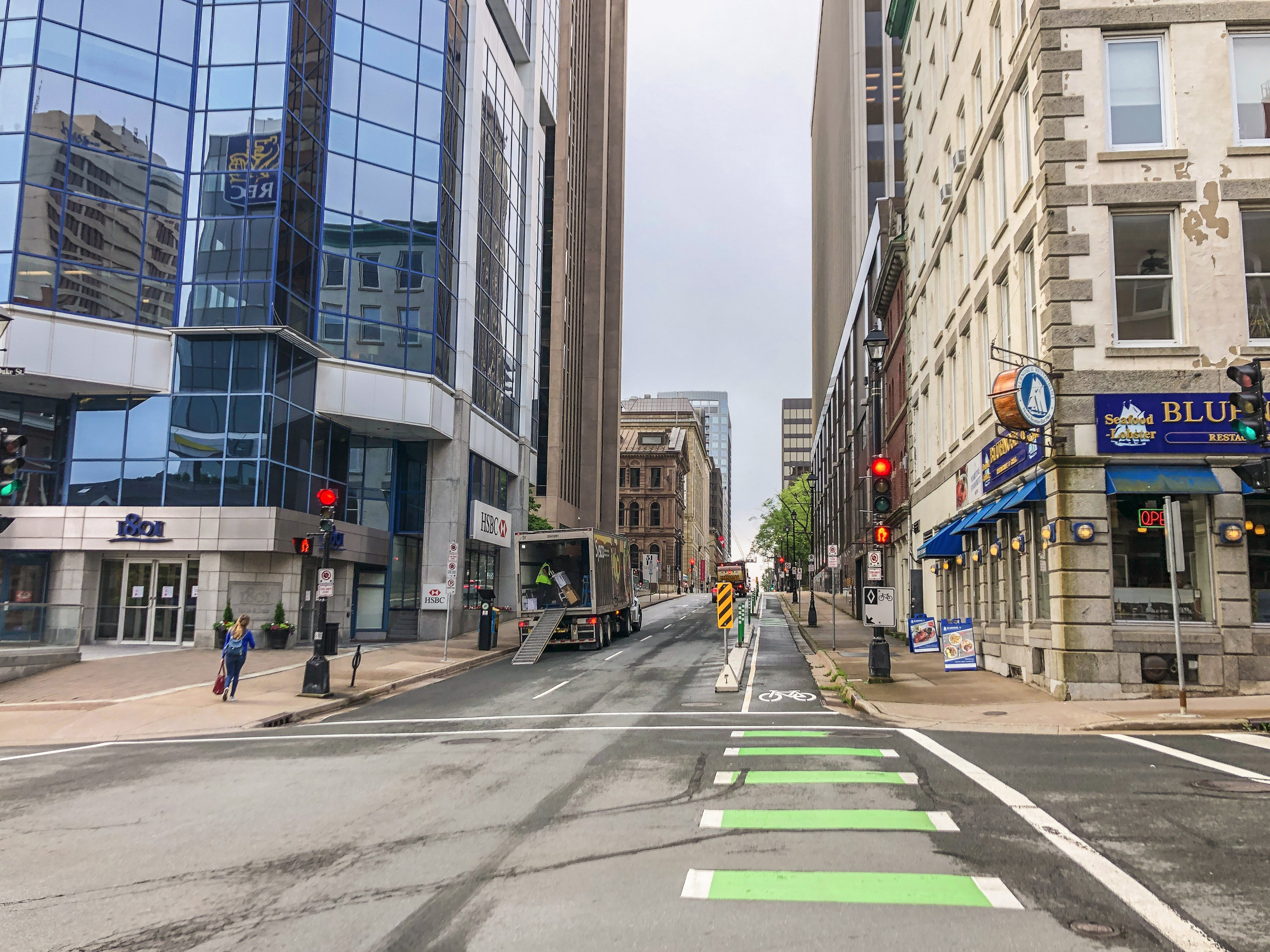
Protected bike lane on Hollis Street, Halifax, NS

As of 2013, Halifax had 226 kilometres (140 miles) of active transportation facilities including 131 kilometres of multi-use trails (called greenways) and 96 kilometres of bike lanes. Halifax has recently added protected bike lanes and is actively working to expand the bike lane network.

=== Ontario ===
A number of bicycle and mixed-use trails can be found throughout Ontario, with some crossing multiple municipalities. Many of these trails are provincially maintained, including Waterfront Trail. The province of Ontario used to provide municipalities with funding for bike infrastructure through the Ontario Municipal Commuter Cycling program that ended in 2018.

==== Brantford ====
Brantford is the meeting point of several rail trails which connect through to other parts of the Ontario trails system. These include the SC Johnson Trail, the Hamilton to Brantford Rail Trail, and the LE&N and TH&B trails.

==== Hamilton ====
Hamilton has a system of dedicated cycling infrastructure. It also has its own local bicycle sharing system, Hamilton Bike Share, which began operations in 2015. The city government invested $3.6 million into cycling infrastructure in 2021 to expand the network of cycling routes by an additional 20 kilometres (12 mi), following a $6 million investment in 2020, which was largely grant-supported. The city also diversified its range of infrastructure types by implementing bicycle boulevards.

==== Kitchener ====
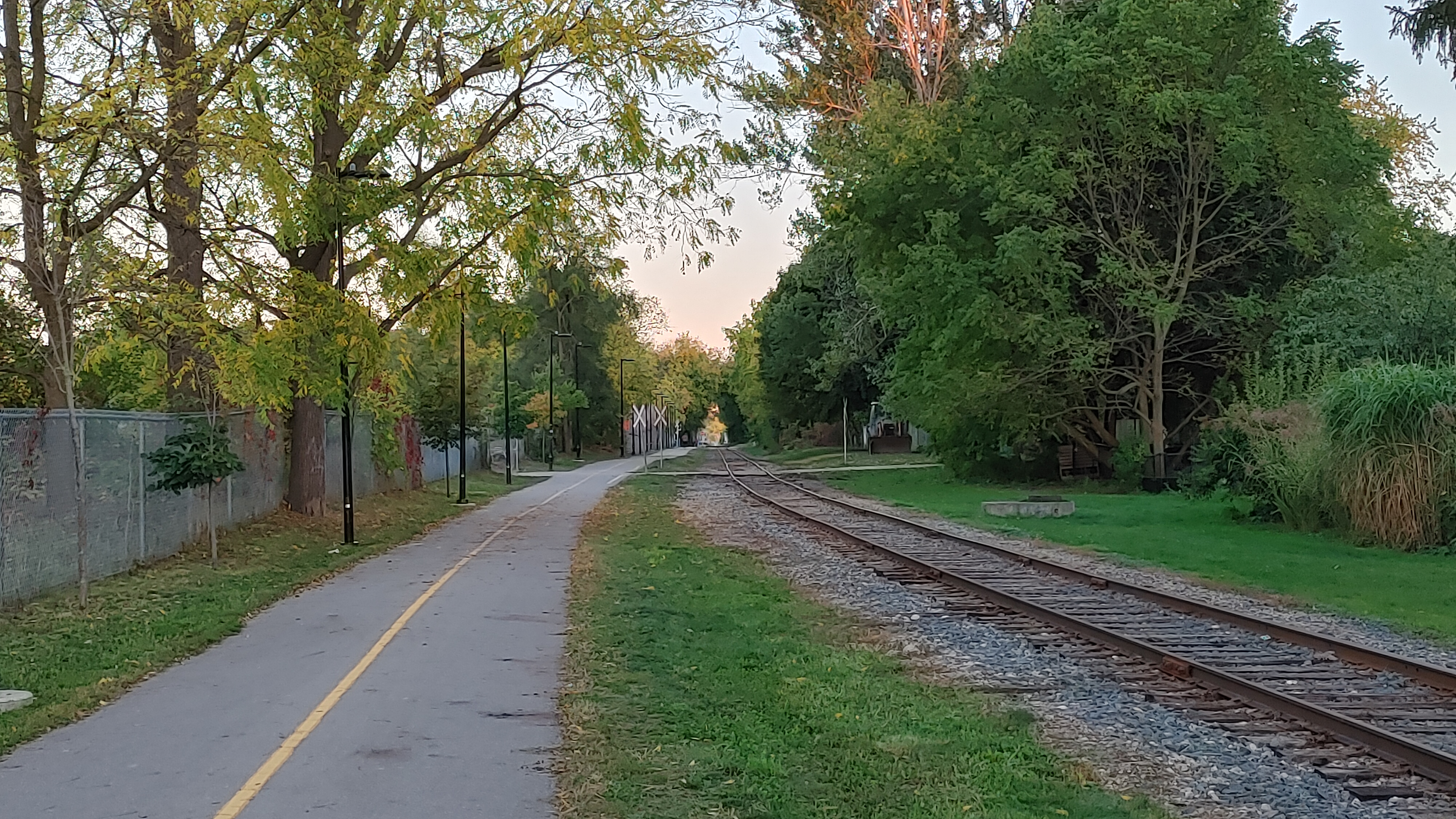
Kitchener's Spurline Trail shares a right of way with the Waterloo Spur, an active rail line.

Kitchener released a Cycling and Trails Master Plan in 2020. The plan focused heavily on equity issues in cycling and on differentiating cycling infrastructure based on different physical abilities. It distinguished and gave primacy to an "All Ages and Abilities Network" category of cycling infrastructure consisting of physically protected cycling lanes, neighbourhood bikeways (designated cycling routes along lower-traffic residential streets), and multi-use trails, with unprotected painted bike lanes, paved shoulders, and unpaved trails given a secondary status as supporting rather than primary facilities. It also identified trails as important for both recreational and commuting opportunities, especially the two rail trails running through the city's urban core: the Iron Horse Trail and the Spurline Trail. Areas noted for improvement included safety, transit connectivity with the cycling network, year-round maintenance of cycling infrastructure, and availability of bicycle parking.

Construction began in 2021 on a key component of the 2020 Master Plan: the Downtown Cycling Grid, a planned system of protected cycling routes along existing downtown streets made possible due to the removal of street space previously dedicated to automobile traffic. A secondary component of the plan was designation of residential streets, mostly in outer parts of downtown, as neighbourhood bikeways.

==== Ottawa ====
Many of Ottawa's urban streets have a combination of cycling facilities, including bike lanes, cycle tracks and paved shoulders. The city also has a series of cycling and pedestrian bridges, four of which have opened since 2014. As of December 31, 2015, the city has 900 km of cycling facilities, including 435 km of multi use pathways, 8 km of cycle tracks, 200 km of on-street bicycle lanes and 257 km of paved shoulders. 204 km of facilities were added between 2011 and 2014.

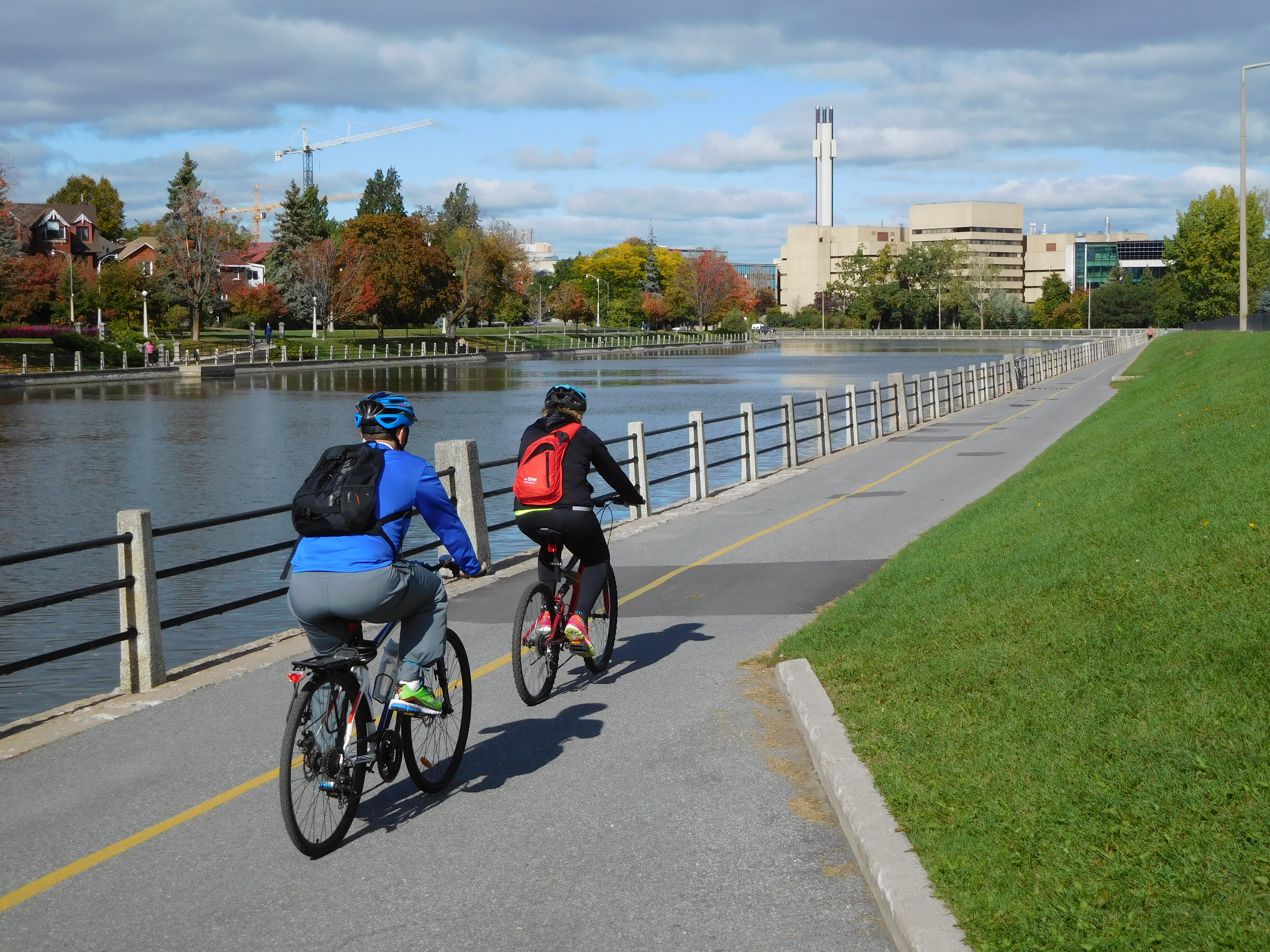
The Capital Pathway is a mixed-use path that Ottawa shares with the neighbouring city of Gatineau.

Ottawa has a portion of the more than 250 km long Capital Pathway Network that it shares with the City of Gatineau. This mixed-use path extends to most suburban neighborhoods and into rural areas beyond, so that many long-distance commuters use at least part of it. It is a recreational pathway that is shared with walkers and runners, and not only apart from traffic, but mostly through parks, green spaces and along waterways. Ottawa closes over 50 kilometres (31 mi) of Colonel By Drive, Kichi Zibi Mikan, and the Rockcliffe Parkway to traffic every Sunday morning May to September, effectively turning the streets into wide recreational lanes. Gatineau Park has a 90 kilometres of trails for mountain biking and for extreme thrill riders near Camp Fortune.

There is a commercial public bike-rental system. Ottawa's city transit have bike racks on all buses that are part of the transitway network and on express routes, but quite infrequently on local routes which use 40' buses. Bicycles are also easily taken aboard the O-Train, the city's light rail transit service.

The City of Ottawa was ranked as a "Gold" Bicycle Friendly Community in 2013 by Share the Road Cycling Coalition, the first city in Ontario to receive this provincial designation.

The 2013 Ottawa Cycling Plan intends to increase citywide cycling mode share during the morning peak period from 2.5 percent in 2011 to 5 percent in 2031 (8 percent and 12 percent respectively in the inner area).

On October 13, 2022, then candidate for mayor Mark Sutcliffe wrote that bike lanes would not help residents with "groceries, taking your kids to school, getting to the community centre for hockey practice".

==== Greater Sudbury ====
The city of Greater Sudbury developed a new Cycling and Pedestrian Master Plan in 2016. The plan called for an expansion of cycling infrastructure in the city's downtown core, as well as adjacent inner suburbs. It also included plans for the first implementation of dedicated cycle tracks in the city. Greater Sudbury received a Bicycle Friendly Community Award at the bronze level from the Share the Road Cycling Coalition in 2018. Sudbury and a number of outlying former towns sit on the Great Lakes Waterfront Trail.

==== Toronto ====
As of December 2017, the City of Toronto has approximately 590 kilometres of on-street bike lanes, about 37 kilometres of which are protected from motor-vehicular traffic. Several types of bicycle lanes exist in Toronto. Types of bike lanes adopted in the city includes the cycle tracks, a type of lanes that uses a physical obstruction to protect cyclists from vehicular traffic. Bike lanes which do not use a physical barrier, use white lines and diamonds to distinguish the bike lanes from the rest of the roadway. Winter maintenance, including snow removal, for bike lanes is done by Toronto Works and Emergency Services.

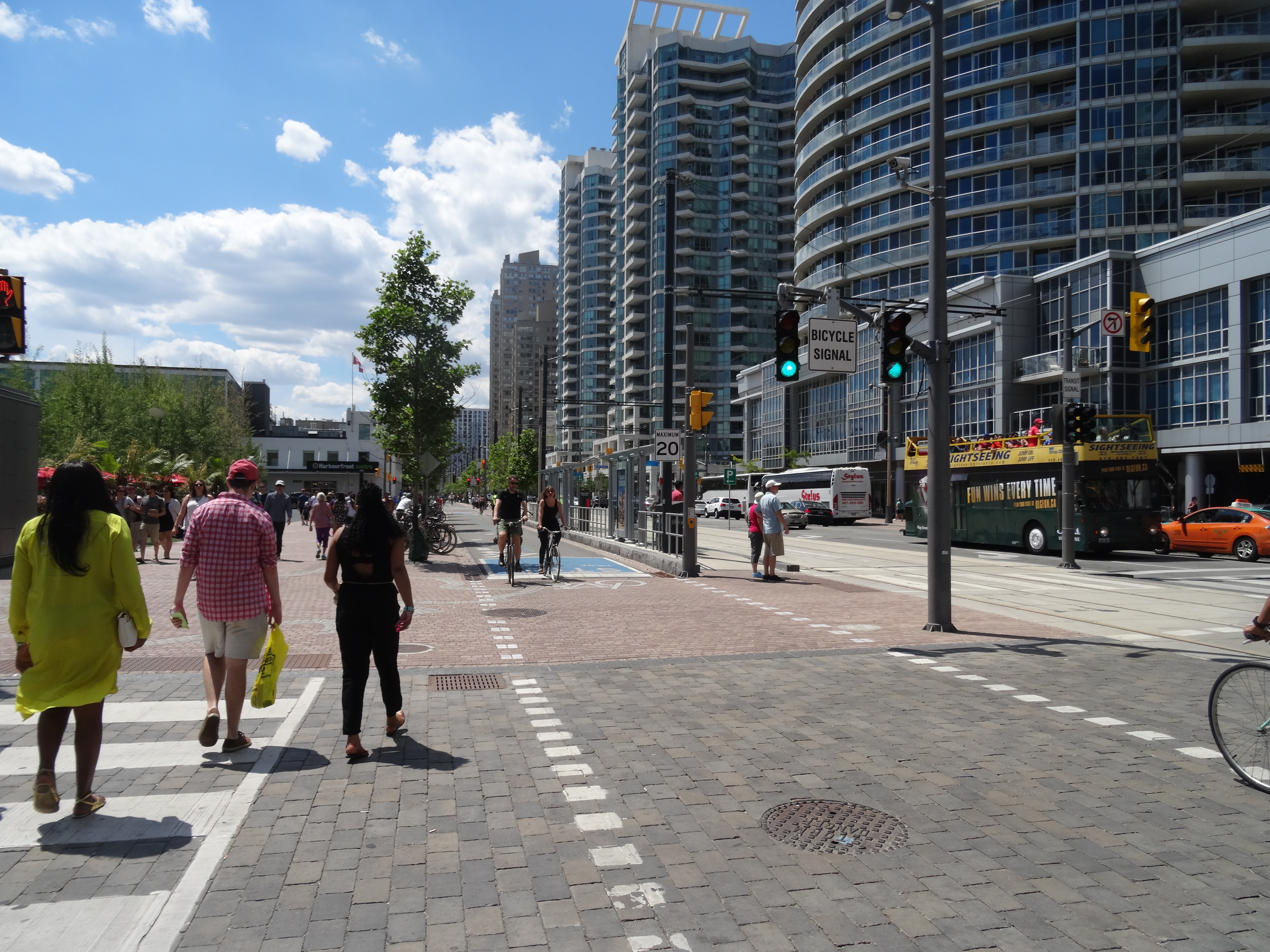
A cycle track at Queen's Quay, Toronto, with traffic lights specifically for cyclists in the cycle track.

Toronto also utilizes shared lane marking on roadways without bike lanes. The markings alert all road users of the presence of bicycle traffic on the street, although they are not considered dedicated cycling facilities. Shared lane markings are typically used to connect disjointed parts of the Toronto cycling network. In addition to on-street bike lanes, the city maintains a number bike trails located throughout the city's parks, and the Toronto ravine system.

In addition to cycling facilities such as bike lanes, the City of Toronto also operates bicycle parking facilities. These facilities include bicycle lockers, indoor bicycle parking stations, bicycle parking rack, and bicycle bollards. The Toronto Transit Commission (TTC) also operates bicycle parking facilities at Toronto subway facilities, as well as bike carriers on the TTC buses. On 3 May 2011, a bicycle-sharing system was launched in the city. Bike Share Toronto is presently operated by the Toronto Parking Authority.

The cost of installing cycling infrastructure varies depending on the area in the city. To paint bicycle lanes on an existing road, the cost will typically be C$40,000–50,000 per km. The implementation of a cycle lane cost approximately $180,000 per km when installed with planters as the separator, although costs escalate up to C$1,000,000 per km for the construction of a curb separated cycle track.

In 2010, City of Toronto reported from a downtown study that 46 percent wore helmets, over 19,000 cyclists enter the downtown core daily, and the 24 percent of roads with bike lanes carried 45 percent of the bike traffic. In June 2016, the Toronto City Council approved a 10-year Cycling Network Plan which plans to add 280 km of bike lanes or cycle tracks on busy roadways, 55 km of bike trails adjacent to busy roadways, and 190 km of cycling routes along quiet roadways.

==== Waterloo ====
Waterloo was recognized as a Gold Bicycle Friendly Community by the Share the Road Cycling Coalition in 2018. As of 2022, the city has over 230 kilometres (140 mi) of cycling infrastructure, which includes multi-use trails.

In 2020, the city embarked on a multifaceted safety programme for both pedestrians and cyclists, which included the implementation of several mid-block pedestrian crossings, speed limit reduction on certain streets to 40 kilometres per hour (25 mph), and some roads being temporarily closed to through traffic, as well as the temporary implementation of slow streets in some areas. Physically protected cycling lanes were implemented along several streets and regional roads in Waterloo around this time as part of a pilot project, which was made permanent in 2021. These roadways had a relatively low number of cyclists, but were considered to have a high potential for growth in cycling traffic by local governments. During the pilot project, cycling traffic increased by 57%, with a 105% increase in traffic during the morning and afternoon peak travel hours.

=== Prince Edward Island ===
The Confederation Trail, a scenic and popular mixed-use rail trail, connects most of the main municipalities and other destinations across the island, as it runs along what used to be the Prince Edward Island Railway. The trail's use is popular as a tourist attraction and its use up to present has primarily been recreational. This may change as the province works towards its Active Transportation Network plan, which aims to make cycling regularly used for everyday practical transportation by creating fully-connected networks of safe cycling paths between destinations; the plan is due to be released in 2022.

The two cities, Summerside and Charlottetown, have started taking first steps to connect the regions in and around each city, but progress remains quite limited in terms of separated multi-use/cycling paths. Charlottetown in particular, features a number of multi-use paths, painted bike lanes, and bike tool locations, with significant plans for further expansion of trails and connectivity between different currently existing separated active transit transportation.

=== Québec ===
A number of bicycle and mixed-use trails can be found throughout Québec, with some crossing multiple municipalities. Many of these trails are provincially maintained, including the Route Verte trail network spread throughout the province.

==== Montréal ====
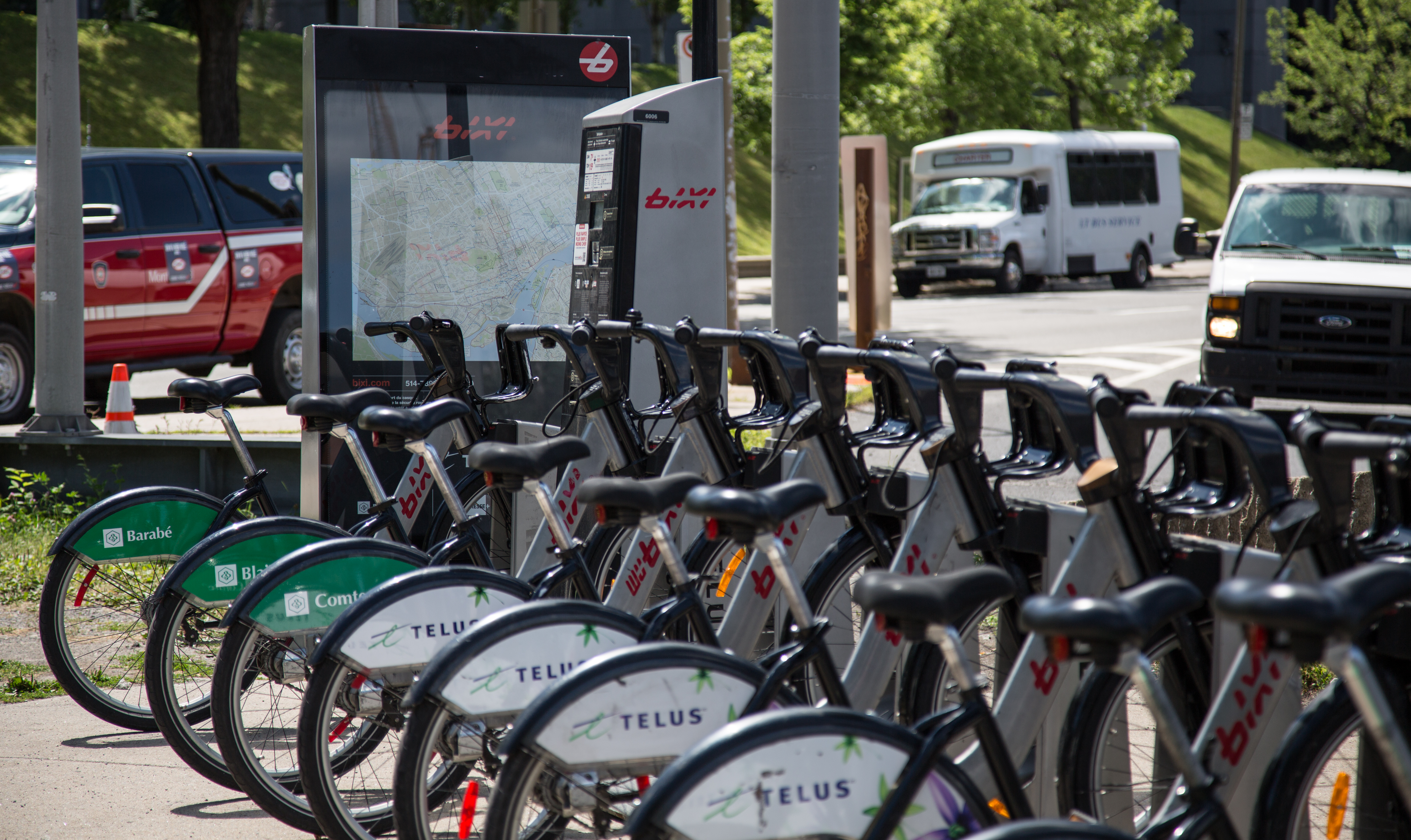
Launched in 2008, BIXI Montréal was the first large-scale bicycle-sharing system in North America.

Montreal is one of the few North American cities to have been listed as a bicycle friendly city on the Copenhagenize index and Global Bicycle Cities index. Montreal has a long history of activism for bicycle infrastructure thanks to the work of Le Monde à bicyclette and was one of the earliest Canadian cities to install bicycle lanes. As of 2022, the metropolitan area of Montreal had 3,450km of bike lanes and shared routes Montreal plans to add 200 kilometres of protected and separated bike paths to the existing protected bike lane network by 2027. The Vision Vélo plan includes more than 40 projects that add to the existing Réseau Express Vélo (REV) bike highways and add safe bike routes into more outlying neighbourhoods. Montreal has 711km of bike routes that are maintained in all four seasons, including winter maintenance with snow plows.

Montreal implemented North America's first large scale bicycle-sharing system known as BIXI in 2009. Users purchase daily or subscription usages for bikes, located in various depots throughout the city.

The Coupe du Monde Cycliste Féminine de Montréal female professional racing event has been held in Montreal since 1998. The Grand Prix Cycliste de Montréal has also been held since 2010.

==== Québec City ====
Québec City is expanding biking infrastructure within the city, as well as maintaining and extending scenic bike trails outside of the main city centre. The municipal public transit provider, RTC, maintains a network of e-bikes in and around Old Quebec, called àVélo, which allows quick rentals of e-bikes via a smartphone application.

=== Saskatchewan ===
==== Regina ====
The city of Regina maintains eight bikes routes, which consist of both shared and bike-only lanes.

==== Saskatoon ====
The city of Saskatoon has plans to build an All Ages and Abilities (AAA) bike network with added multi-use paths, protected bike lanes and neighbourhood bikeways, or bicycle boulevards, connecting across the city.

== See also ==
- Canadian records in track cycling
- Cycling Canada Cyclisme
- Bicycle Touring
