= Beechville-Lakeside-Timberlea Trail =

Multi-purpose trail in Halifax, Nova Scotia, Canada

Beechville Lakeside Timberlea Trail
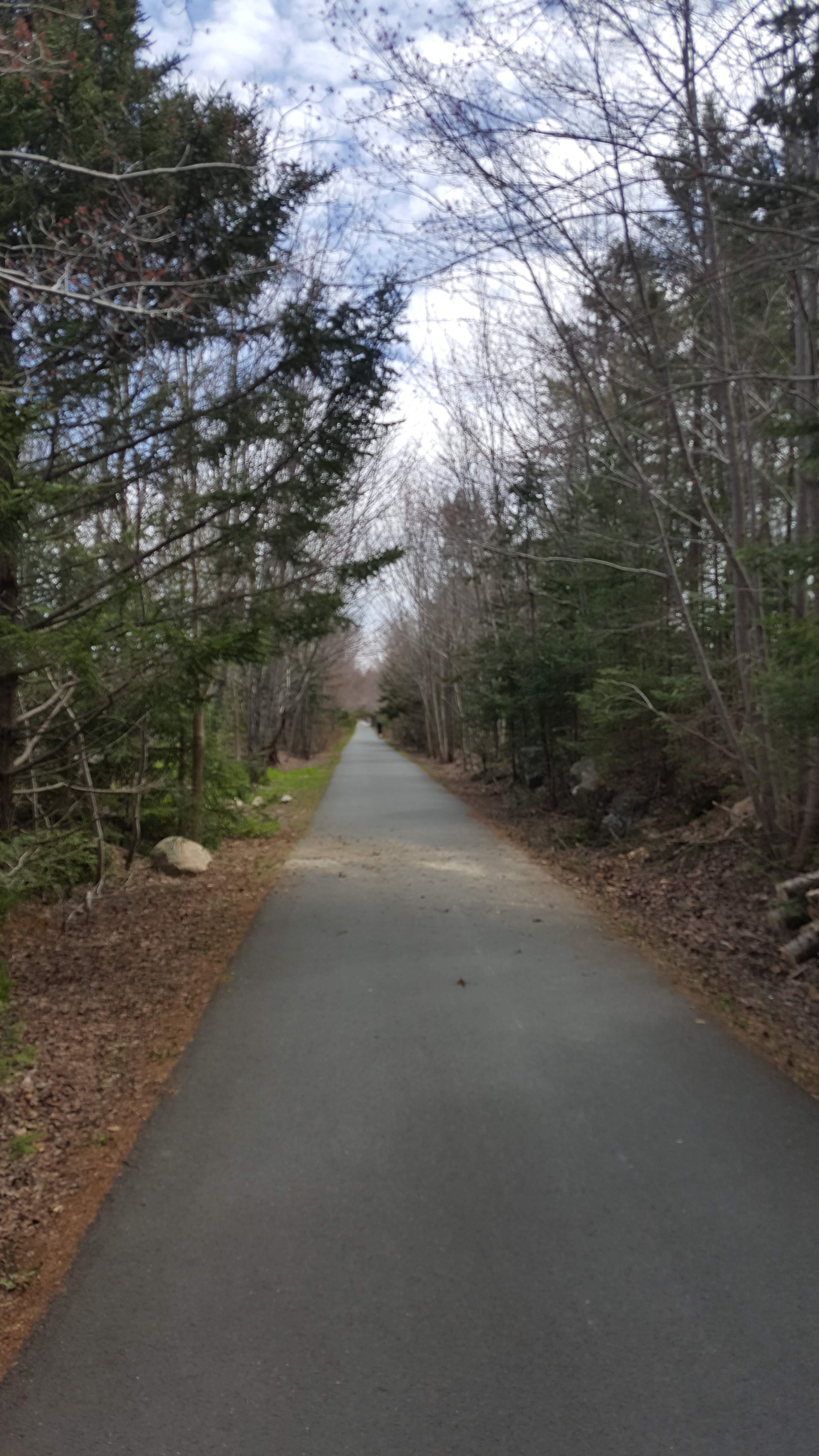
- KM#4 Marker along the BLT Trail
- Length: 13 km (8.1 mi)
- Location: Halifax, Nova Scotia, Canada
- Trailheads: Trunk 3 / St. Margaret's Bay Trail in Lewis Lake; Lakeside Park Drive / Chain of Lakes Trail in Beechville
- Use: Walking; hiking; biking; cross-country; Nordic walking; all-terrain vehicles; bird watching; nature appreciation; snowshoes; wheelchair
- Highest point: Timberlea, 96 m (315 ft)
- Lowest point: Timberlea, 64 m (210 ft)
- Difficulty: Easy
- Season: Year-round
- Surface: Crusher dust
- Website: www.region.halifax.ns.ca/trails/BeechvilleLakesideTimberlea.php

The Beechville Lakeside Timberlea Trail (also known as the BLT Trail) is a multi-use recreational trail in Halifax, Nova Scotia that runs from Lewis Lake to Beechville. The trail is named for the towns through which it travels, namely Timberlea, Lakeside, and Beechville from west to east. The route is parallel to Trunk 3. The trail is part of the Rum Runners trail system, going from Halifax to Lunenburg, which is part of Nova Scotia's Blue Route cycling network.

== History ==
The rail line the trail follows now was built by Halifax and South Western Railway (H&SW) in 1904 to service towns along the South Shore. In 1906, H&SW merged with Canadian Northern Railway and in 1918, facing bankruptcy, was acquired by the federal government and placed under the control of the newly formed Canadian National Railways (CN). In 1969, CN ended passenger service along the line. In 1993, the tracks along which the trail runs today were abandoned and in 1997, the property was given to the provincial Department of Natural Resources at no cost.

== Route ==
The western trailhead can be found at the intersection of Trunk 3 and St. Margaret's Bay Trail in Lewis Lake. The trail travels east through Hubley before going under an overpass carrying Hwy 103. It crosses Trunk 3 again in Timberlea and continues west along Governor Lake before entering Lakeside and then Beechville, where it ends at the intersection of Lakeside Park Drive and the Chain of Lakes Trail.
