= Capital Pathway =

Bike and pedestrian pathway in Canada

Coordinates: 45°25′35″N 75°41′57″W

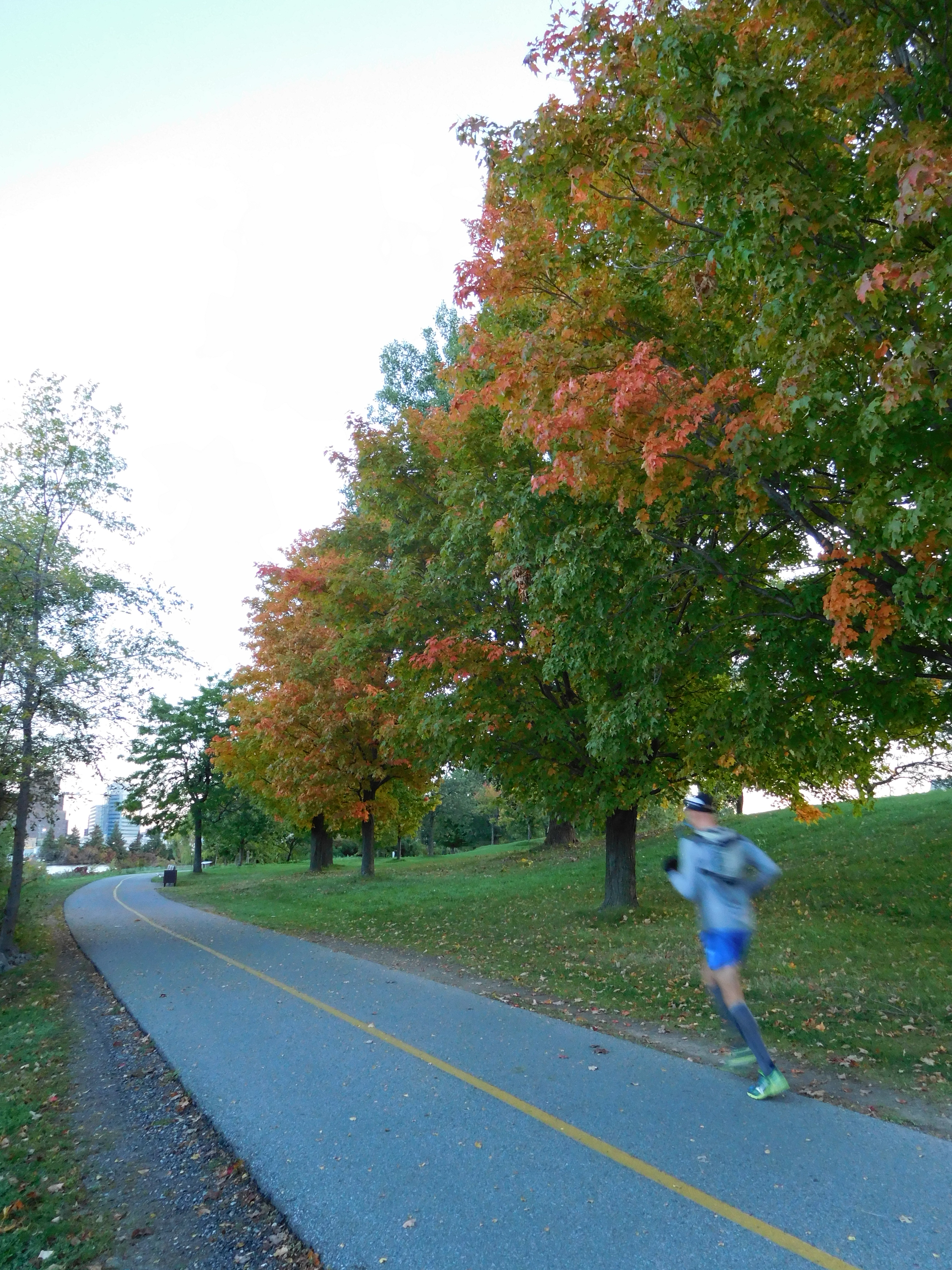
- A section of the Ottawa River Pathway near the Canadian War Museum
- Length: 220 km (140 mi)
- Location: Ottawa, Ontario; Gatineau, Quebec
- Trailheads: West: Moodie Drive at Corkstown Road; East: Tweddle Road at Jeanne d'Arc Boulevard North; North: Pink Lake, Gatineau Park; South: Hog's Back Road (Hog's Back Falls)
- Use: Walking, jogging, bicycling and dog walking
- Sights: Canadian War Museum; Mooney's Bay beach, Brittania beach; Rideau Canal; National Arts Centre; Parliament Hill; Chateau Laurier; Notre-Dame Basilica; Byward Market; National Gallery of Canada; Royal Canadian Mint; Ottawa City Hall; 24 Sussex Drive and Rideau Hall; National Aviation Museum; Museum of Civilization; Casino du Lac-Leamy; Gatineau Park
- Hazards: Crosses city transit in Ottawa's west end; Not illuminated at night; Poison ivy along Ottawa River
- Maintainer: National Capital Commission
- Website: ncc-ccn.gc.ca/places/capital-pathway

The Capital Pathway, also known informally as the Bike Path, is a 220-kilometre (140 mi) recreational pathway interlinking many parks, waterways and sites in Ottawa, Ontario and Gatineau, Quebec. Most of the pathway is paved, and allows an almost continuous route through the National Capital Region.

The pathway was mostly the work of the National Capital Commission (NCC), a crown corporation created in 1959. The trail, which includes the Rideau Canal Pathway, the Ottawa River Pathway, and the Rideau River Eastern Pathway extends in all directions and extends northward into Gatineau Park's lakes.

== History ==
The Capital Pathway was a project of the National Capital Commission as part of their improvements to the National Capital Region. The NCC was created by an act of parliament in 1959. The first section built was the Ottawa River Pathway in the early 1970s.

The majority of the pathway continues to be maintained by the NCC.

The section of the Ottawa River Pathway between Acres Road and Moodie Drive was paved in 2009.

== Routes ==
=== Ottawa River Pathway ===
The Ottawa River Pathway runs along the south bank of the Ottawa River. In the east, it ends at Tweddle Road (near Trim Road) providing access to nearby beach at Petrie Island on the Ottawa River. It continues westward, interrupted on the west side of Orleans by two connector streets before resuming. Going westward, it meets up with the pathway along the Aviation Parkway which is at the Canada Aviation and Space Museum. Further along, it becomes a part of the Trans Canada Trail / The Great Trail using a connecting trail and Sussex Drive as it winds through Rockcliffe Park to the residence of the Prime Minister at 24 Sussex Drive and nearby Rideau Hall the residence of the Governor General. Large sections of this path east of the Canada Aviation and Space Museum remain unpaved, and between there and Rockcliffe there is a choice of a paved path or an unpaved one, while the remainder is paved.

Close to Major's Hill Park, and by crossing the Rideau Canal where it meets the Ottawa River at the Ottawa locks, it continues adjacent to the river on the back side of Parliament Hill and then near the War Museum in LeBreton Flats.

It continues first Westboro Beach, then Brittania Beach. Nearby, it crosses Carling Avenue becoming the Watts Creek Pathway which eventually crosses the Greenbelt Pathway. Here, going west will go to Kanata, north will go to Shirley's Bay, and south will go to the Trans Canada Trail rail trail to Stittsville and Carleton place.

There are connections to Gatineau via multi-use pathways via either the Chief William Commanda Bridge or the Alexandra Bridge.

=== Rideau Canal Pathway ===
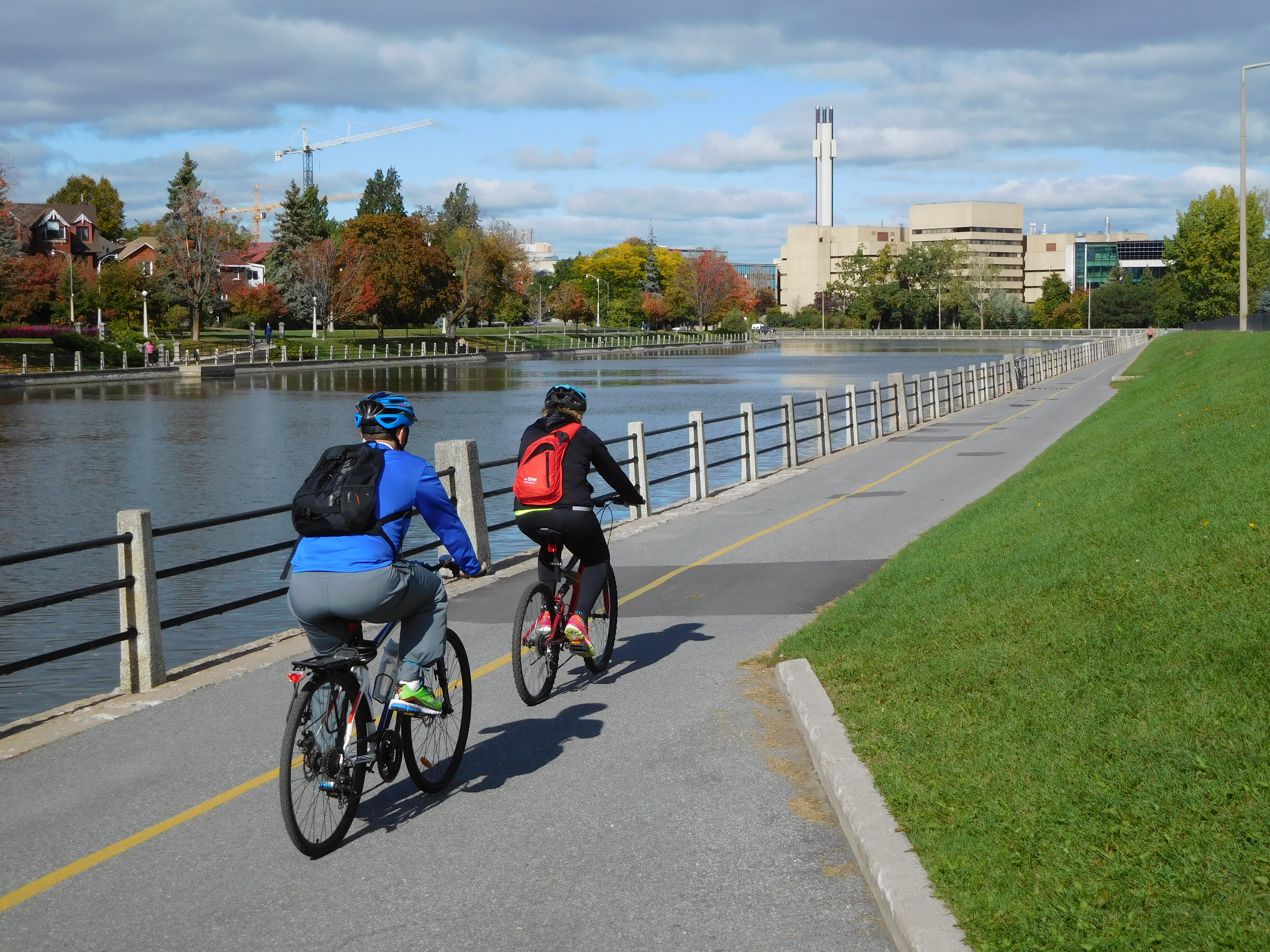
Cyclists riding on the Rideau Canal Pathway

The most well known of all the sections of the Capital Pathway is the Rideau Canal section. Its downtown location attracts tourists and residents, frequently used for walking, cycling, and running. It continues to be popular in the winter, as the Rideau Canal is widely known as one of the longest skating rinks in the world, with 6 to 8 km of skatable surface on most days in January.

The Rideau Canal Pathway's most northerly point is where the canal empties into the Ottawa River. Immediately beside the locks is the Bytown Museum. There actually are two separate paths, on each side of the canal. One encircles Dow's Lake and path users frequently cross to the other side near Carleton University, just south of the lake.

The trail extends to Hog's Back Falls which also provides a crossing. This is the point where the canal meets the Rideau River. A multi-use trail continues on its east side past Mooney's Bay Park to Walkley Road.

=== Rideau River Eastern Pathway ===
The Rideau River Eastern Pathway is almost unknown by tourists but frequented by residents. It starts at Rideau Falls where the Rideau River meets the Ottawa River. It goes southward through New Edinburgh then along Riverside Drive until it reaches Billings Bridge. Here is a park where ducks frequent. From Billings Bridge, it continues south until it meets up with the Rideau Canal at the Hog's Back Falls.

=== Other routes ===
Besides the Rideau Canal Pathway, Ottawa River Pathway, and Rideau River Eastern Pathway, the following pathways are also part of the Capital Pathway in Ottawa:

- Watts Creek Pathway
- Pinecrest Creek Pathway
- Experimental Farm Pathway
- Aviation Pathway
- Greenbelt Pathway

The Capital Pathway also include several routes in Quebec. Aylmer is home to an effective and generally well-maintained network of bicycle paths that encircle the central portion of the area and run past many scenic locations, such as the Aylmer Marina and the Deschênes Rapids.

The bike trail becomes very steep going northwards into Gatineau Park. Pink Lake is directly on the path. Other lakes such Kingsmere Lake are accessible. The Champlain Lookout provides a good view of lands to the west of the city of Ottawa from a high elevation.

== Safety ==
Despite the National Capital Region having a very low crime rate, attention has been given to safety on the pathway. The pathway is dark at night, has places where traffic may be hazardous, and has been involved in the investigation of more than one homicide.

The Pathway patrol is a volunteer organization based in Ottawa. Trained volunteer patrollers cycle, in-line skate, or walk along Ottawa's recreational pathways to promote active living, improve safety and security, and to encourage courtesy among all users. Areas patrolled span the NCC pathways in the west from Andrew Haydon Park through Britannia Park, east along the Ottawa River Pathway to Petrie Island, the Rideau Canal (downtown to Mooney's Bay), the Rideau River (Sussex Drive to Mooney's Bay) and within City of Ottawa parks in the Greenboro area. In 2010, Kanata was added to the patrol region.

In 2003, Ardeth Wood disappeared from a pathway near Rockcliffe Parkway starting a large search effort, and resulting in a homicide conviction. There have also been more than one criminal incident on pathways in Gatineau.

== See also ==
- Cycling in Canada
- Greenbelt (Ottawa)
- List of cycleways
