= Bayers Lake Business Park =

Business area in Halifax, Nova Scotia

Coordinates: 44°39′0″N 63°40′27″W

Bayer's Lake
- Urban Neighbourhood
- Location within Nova Scotia
- Country: Canada
- Province: Nova Scotia
- Municipality: Halifax Regional Municipality
- Community: Halifax

Area
  - Total: 2.36 km^{2} (0.91 sq mi)
- Telephone Exchanges: 902, 782

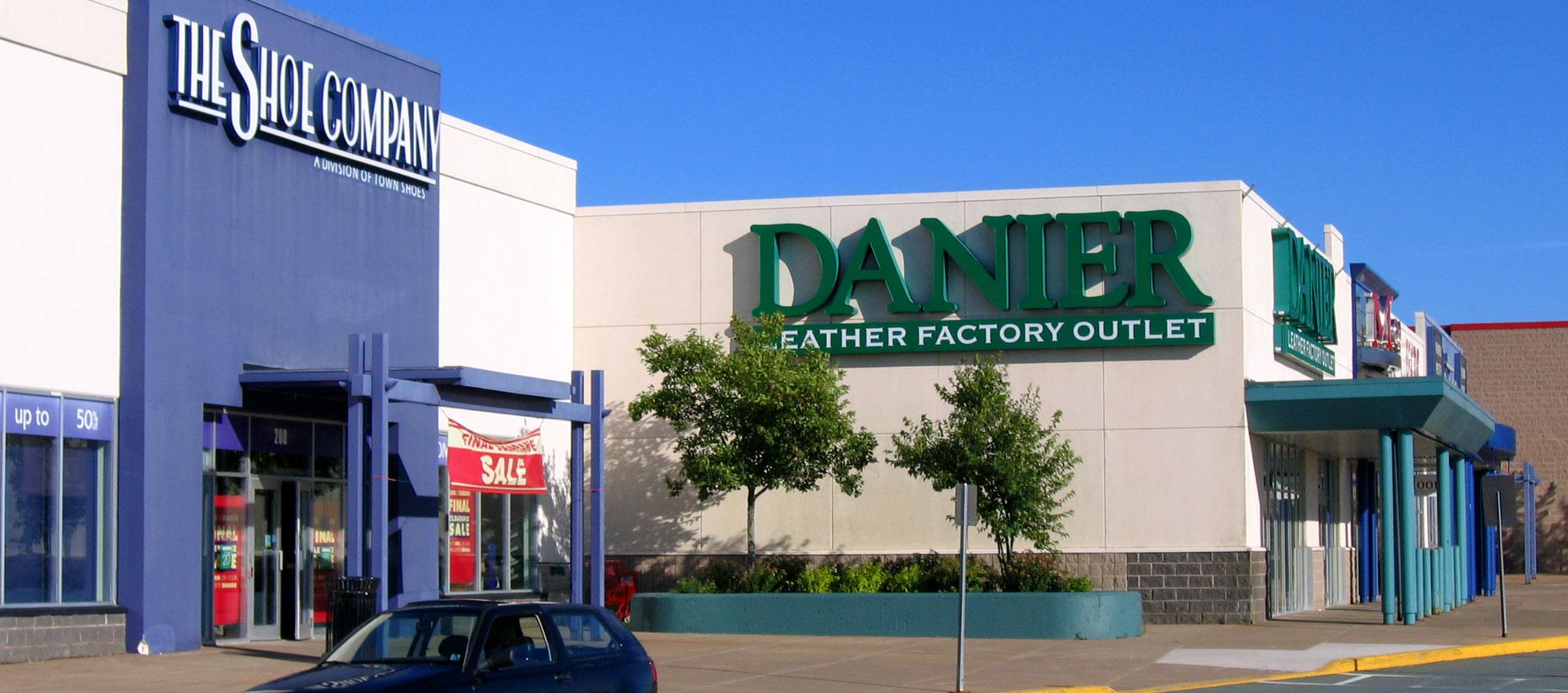
The Shoe Company, and Danier (now closed) stores

Bayers Lake Business Park is a business park in Halifax, Nova Scotia west of Clayton Park.

== History ==
The Bayers Lake Industrial Park was developed from the mid-1980s, and was served by CN Rail's Chester Subdivision rail line running from Halifax to Yarmouth as well as Highway 102 and Highway 103. Some of the earliest developments were the Nova Scotia Liquor Commission head office and distribution centre and the Volvo Halifax Assembly, both constructed in 1987.

The industrial park began a transition into a business/retail park in the early 1990s. The first major development occurred when the United States warehouse store chain Price Club (currently a Costco) established a retail store on a westward extension of Lacewood Drive which was called Chain Lake Drive. Additional big box development followed with the establishment of a Kent Building Supplies, followed by a Kmart (subsequently redeveloped as a Zellers, then a Target, now a Canadian Tire), and an Atlantic Superstore (Now Real Atlantic Superstore). The popularity of the new retail outlets at Bayers Lake Industrial Park, or "BLIP" as it was popularly referred to by locals, was apparent.

Further development occurred when Empire Theatres selected Bayers Lake for the establishment of the largest theatre multiplex in Atlantic Canada (17 screens + 1 IMAX); the multiplex is currently operated by Cineplex Entertainment. The multiplex development led to an expansion in restaurants and other retail outlets.

Bayers Lake Business Park presently occupies over 2.36 square kilometres (580 acres) and includes both retail and industrial uses. The business park is administered by the Halifax Regional Municipality.

A wildfire forced the evacuation of the business park in August 2025.

== Transportation ==
The business park is located at the junction of two major highways; Highway 102 and Highway 103. The park is approximately 10 kilometres from Downtown Halifax. An abandoned Canadian National Railway line runs through the park as a rail trail. The park is also serviced by Halifax Transit buses: 21 Timberlea, and 28 Bayers Lake.

== Mystery walls ==
The Bayer's Lake Mystery Walls were discovered several years ago during an expansion of the Bayers Lake Business Park. Extending more than 200 metres and measuring as high as two metres, the stone wall is baffling to many historians.

== Tenants ==
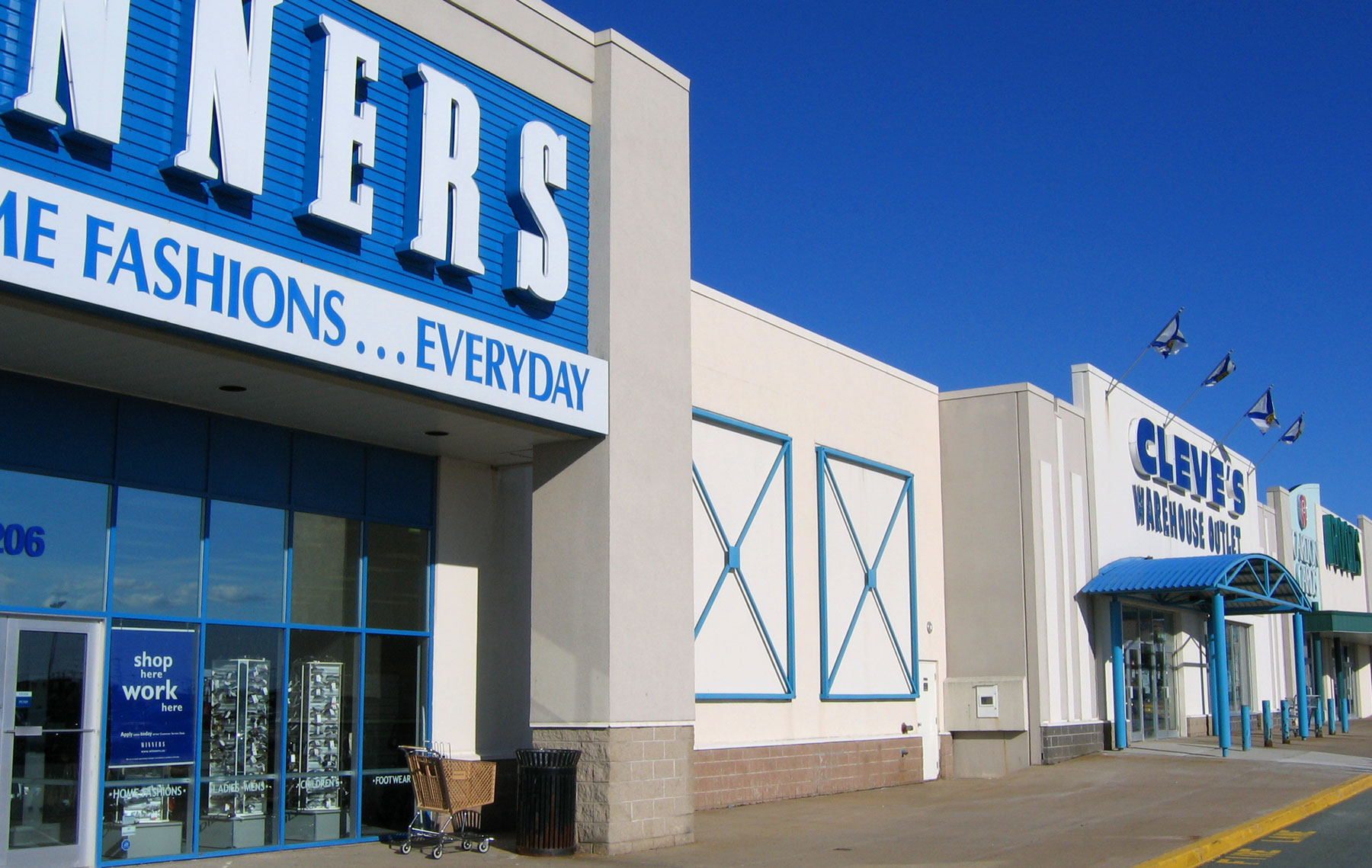
Winners and Cleve's Warehouse Outlet (now Cleve's Source for Sports).

Major retailers

- Canadian Tire
- Costco
- Kent Building Supplies
- Real Atlantic Superstore
- Walmart Supercentre

Minor retailers

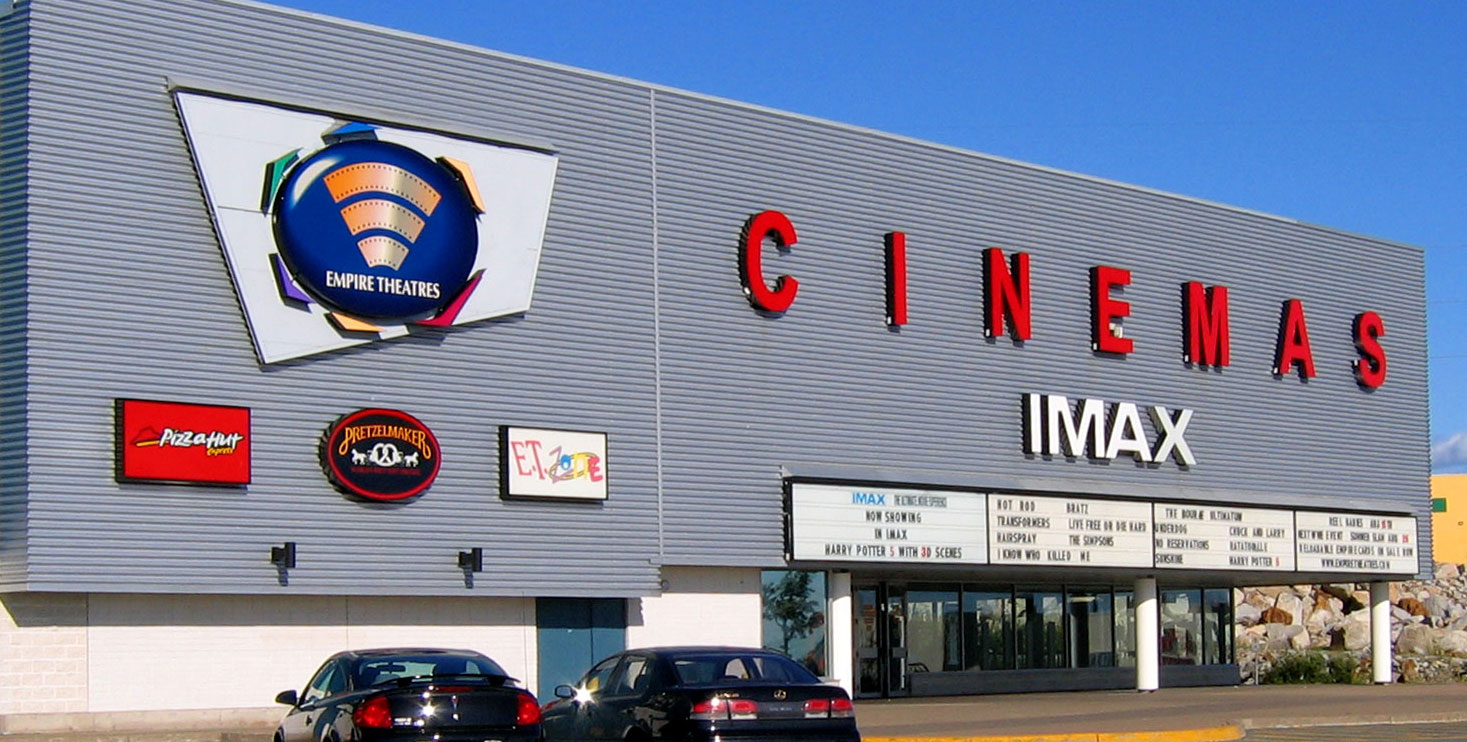
Empire Theatres (now Scotiabank Theatre)

- 3 Mile Outfitters
- Best Buy
- Bumper to Bumper
- Canada Computers & Electronics
- Carter / Osh Kosh
- Cleve's Source for Sports (formerly Cleve's Warehouse Outlet)
- D & M Sports
- DSW
- Dollar Tree
- Dollarama
- EB Games
- GAP Outlet
- Giant Tiger (formerly Home Outfitters)
- Golf Central
- Global Pet Food
- Happy Harry's
- Healthy Bug
- Henry's
- Indigo (formerly Chapters)
- La Vie en Rose Outlet
- Lee Valley Tools
- Made in the Maritimes
- Mark's
- Marshalls
- Mastermind Toys
- Michaels
- Mission Mart
- Mr. Big & Tall
- Moores
- Napa Auto Parts
- Old Navy
- Once Upon a Child
- PartyCity
- PetSmart
- Penn
- Privateers Harley-Davidson
- Rallye Motoplex
- Reitmans
- Ren's Pets
- The Shoe Company
- Sport Chek
- Staples
- Value Village
- Winners

Grocers / Provisions

- A2Z Cash n' Carry
- Bismillah Butchery and Deli(Halal)
- Bulk Barn
- Costco
- Gary's Fresh Seafoods (Sept-July, A pickup in the Kent parking lot, Tuesday-Friday)
- Giant Tiger
- The Great British Shop
- New Asian Market
- New Indian Bazaar
- Nova Scotia Liquor Corporation
- Real Atlantic Superstore
- WalMart

Home Improvement and Furnishings

- Bath Depot
- Benjamin Moore (PaintShop)
- The Brick
- CIL
- Dulux
- Floors Plus Outlet
- Heritage Hearth
- HomeSense
- Jordan's
- Kvardo
- La-Z-Boy Furniture Gallery
- Linen Chest
- Mattress Mart
- Nothin' Fancy
- Structube
- Ultimate Home Comfort
- Vintage Flooring
- Worldwide Furniture

Restaurants

- 5k Cafe
- A&W
- Big Leagues
- Burger King
- Boston Pizza
- Dhaba
- Cha Baa Thai
- Dairy Queen
- East Side Mario's
- Ela! Greek Taverna
- Five Guys
- Fredie's Fantatic Fish
- Harvey's
- Hobson Lake Cafe
- Jack Astor's
- Jungle Jim's Eatery
- Ilai (coming)
- Le Rouge
- McDonald's
- Mexi's
- Mizu AYCE
- Monsaba
- Montana's
- Moxie's
- Osmow's
- Pizza Delight
- PrestoTea
- Second Cup
- Starbucks
- Subway
- Sushi Nami
- Steele Volvo
- Tim Hortons x2
- Wendy's

Services

- Access NS
- Bell Aliant
- Canadian Automobile Association
- Enterprise
- ET's Car Wash
- Hertz
- First Choice Hair Cutters
- OK Tire
- Nova Scotia Health Outpatient Centre
- Nova Trophy
- Optical Warehouse
- Petro Canada
- Raven Autosports
- Rogers (Paired with Fido)
- Rust Check
- SpecSavers
- TD Bank
- Tesla Supercharger (Coming late 2026)
- Timberlea Tire
- Vogue Optical
- Wonder Automotive

Beuty Supply

- Chatters
- Cosmo Pro
- Eastern Aesthetics
- Maritime Beauty

Hotels

- Coastal Inn and Suites
- Comfort Inn
- Halifax Tower Hotel

Attractions

- Club House Golf Simulator
- Hop Skip & Play
- Putting Edge
- Scotiabank Theatre Halifax with IMAX (formerly Empire Theatres and Cineplex Cinemas)
- Seven Bays Climbing
- Steele Wheels Motor Museum

Former

- Ardene
- Addtion Elle
- Bed Bath & Beyond
- Bombay
- EFADS
- Home Outfitters
- Kartbahn Racing
- Kmart
- Kokomos
- La Cucina
- La Senza
- Lane Home Furnishings
- Linens 'n Things
- Pets Unlimited
- PSEUDIO
- Racing Around
- Roots
- Susie's Shortbreads
- Target
- Toys R Us
- Zellers

== In popular culture ==
The Bayers Lake Scotiabank Theatre (as Empire Theatres) was featured in the 2006 film "Trailer Park Boys: The Movie", most prominently during the "Big Dirty" scene.

== See also ==
- Burnside Industrial Park
- Dartmouth Crossing
