= Pathway patrol =

Canadian volunteer organization

The Pathway patrol is a volunteer organization, managed by the City of Ottawa's City Wide Sports Department based in Ottawa, Canada. Trained volunteer patrollers cycle, in-line skate, or walk along Ottawa's recreational pathways to promote active living, improve safety and security, and to encourage courtesy among all users. Areas patrolled span the NCC pathways in the west from Andrew Haydon Park through Britannia Park, east along the Ottawa River Pathway to Petrie Island, the Rideau Canal (downtown to Mooney's Bay), the Rideau River (Sussex Drive to Mooney's Bay) and within City of Ottawa parks in the Greenboro area. In 2010, Kanata was added to the patrol region.

== See also ==
- Capital Pathway
- Greenbelt (Ottawa)
