= Greater Victoria Cycling Coalition =

The Greater Victoria Cycling Coalition (GVCC) was a cycling advocacy group based in Victoria, British Columbia, Canada. In 2021 the Greater Victoria Cycling Coalition merged with the Greater Victoria Bike to Work Society to form 'Capital Bike'.

Originally founded in 1991, the GVCC was one of Canada's oldest cycling advocacy organizations. The GVCC was a volunteer organization dedicated to improving cycling in Victoria, BC, and increasing ridership through advocacy, participation, and education.

The GVCC's focuses included cycling advocacy, publication of Cycle Therapy, a quarterly magazine, Bike Sense, the cycling safety manual for British Columbia, weekly recreational rides, themed rides including the annual Architectural Bike Tour in conjunction with the Architectural Institute of British Columbia, production of cycling maps and on special events, such as 2009's Velo Victoria.

The GVCC hosted several international transportation symposia in its history, including the National Center for Bicycling an Walking's Pro Walk/Pro Bike conference in 2004, the Streets Are For People conference in 1998, and the Traffic Calming Conference in 1995.

The GVCC was instrumental in the development of the Galloping Goose Regional Trail, having organized the first cleanup of what would become the trail. GVCC members provided input to the development of the E&N Railway Trail and the Capital Regional District's Bicycle and Pedestrian Master Plan.
