= Bayer's Lake Mystery Walls =

Series of stone structures in Nova Scotia

Coordinates: 44.643°N 63.659°W

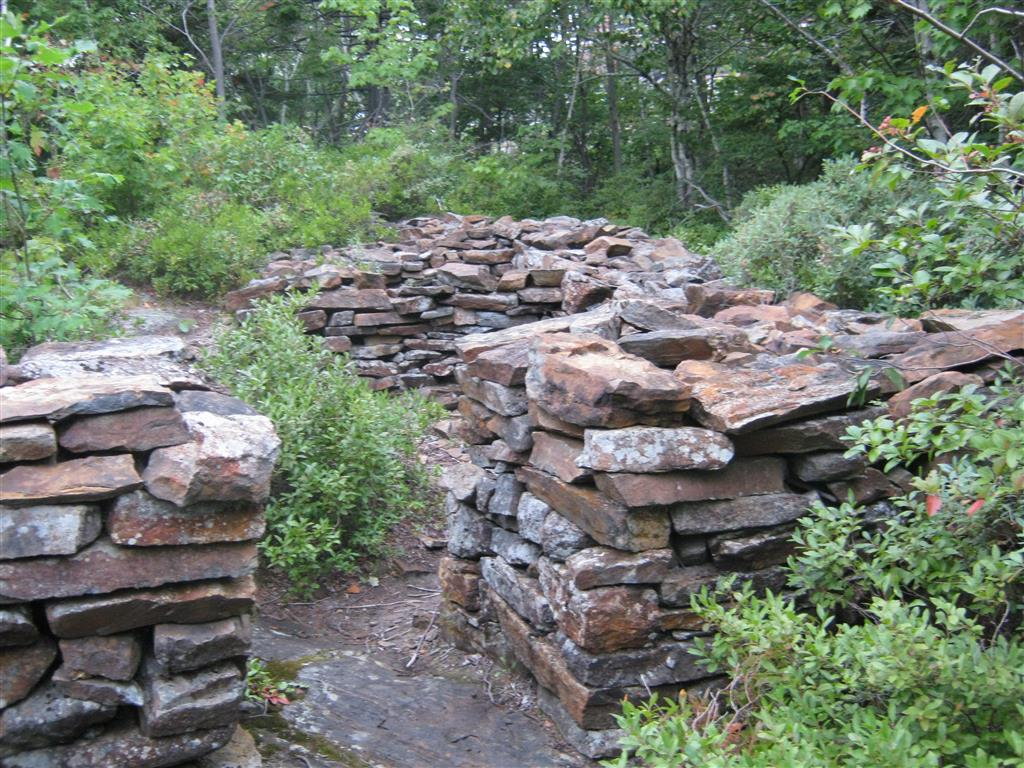
Bayer's Lake Mystery Walls

The Bayers Lake Mystery Walls are a series of stone structures and walls of unknown origin and uncertain age in Halifax, Nova Scotia.

== Overview ==
The ruins consist of walls outlining a small five-sided building and a 150-metre wall with ditches, both made with flat-surfaced ironstone slate rocks on the slope of a hill overlooking the Bayers Lake Park. The mysterious ruins pose many unanswered questions for archaeologists. The most simple and humble explanation suggests a sheep pen, but some envision a military purpose, either a training installation or a defensive work. The walls are a protected archaeological site designated under Nova Scotia's Special Places Act. The site is included within the historic limits of one of the nine original Dutch Village grants issued in 1762 – a 150-acre grant assigned to Johann Gotlieb Shermuller. Schermuller sold the property in 1770 and moved to Philadelphia, where he became a butcher. The site changed hands many times after 1770. However, given its ground conditions, it is unlikely to ever have been farmed. The only structure on the property for which there is known documentary evidence is Feature 2. A 1918 map depicts a building standing in approximately the location of the site steps. (DMD 1918).

== Advocacy ==
In October 1990, Jack McNab contacted local media regarding this site, as it was about to be cleared for the newly developed Bayers Lake Business Park. His effort helped protect the area. In 2013 the Nova Scotia Archaeology Society set up a committee called Bayers Lake Walls Historical Site Advocacy, as a result of recent vandalism to the site.

== Research ==
In December 1990, Davis Archaeological Consultants opened a single test unit within the sub-chamber, due to overnight freezing of the ground the excavation was not completed. The cultural material recovered was not a reflection of the true age of the structure and is viewed as intrusive material deposited long after the building was built.

From May 27 to June 5, 1998, a total of 118 artifacts were recovered from test units excavated at the entrance to the enclosure as part of the Saint Mary's University field school project. It was concluded that all material was deposited within the last 70–90 years.

In December 1998, a lichenologist examined the masonry of the wall and identified patterns of lichen growth that indicated that the stonework had not been disturbed since around 1798.

On May 30, 2006, W. Bruce Stewart conducted photographic documentation of the physical condition of the known archaeological features. Precise mapping of these features was conducted on August 2, 2006, with the assistance of Greg Baker, Research Instrument Technician in the Maritime Provinces Spatial Analysis Research Centre at Saint Mary's University. A differential GPS unit was used to identify x y z coordinates for key anchor points on each of the major features within the Bayers Lake Historic Site.

In March 2015, John Bignell submitted a document to area councilor Reg Rankin to discuss possibilities for further exploration, interpretation and protection of the site. The Bayers Lake Walls Heritage Site Advocacy Committee was tasked with the goal of developing a short-term plan and long-term plan to protect and stabilize the Bayer's Lake Historical (Mystery Walls) Site. On March 10, 2015, Regional council received an information report which resulted in a proposal being submitted to HRM and pasted on July 28. The funding approved will assist in the funding of an X-ray fluorescence (pXRF) system in order to analyze soil chemistry in and around the site, which will take about two days of fieldwork.

In 2017, the site was examined with an X-ray fluorescence analyzer, but did not find elevated levels of phosphorus which would have been expected in the presence of human or animal urine or feces, bone, meat, fish or plants.
