= Structube =

Canadian furniture retailer

Structube Ltee
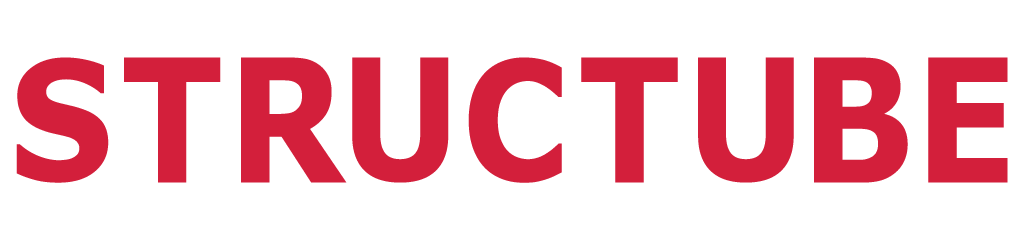
- Type: Private
- Industry: Retail, e-commerce
- Founded: 1974
- Headquarters: Laval, Quebec, Canada
- Number of locations: 75 (March 2020)
- Products: Home furnishings
- Revenue: ▲US$149 million (2025)
- Number of employees: 650+ (2020)
- Website: structube.com

Structube Ltee is a Canadian retailer of modern home furniture and accessories. It was founded as a family business in 1974 and currently operates over 70 stores across Canada. The Structube head office and distribution centre are located in Laval, Quebec. The company employs over 650 people in eight provinces across Canada.

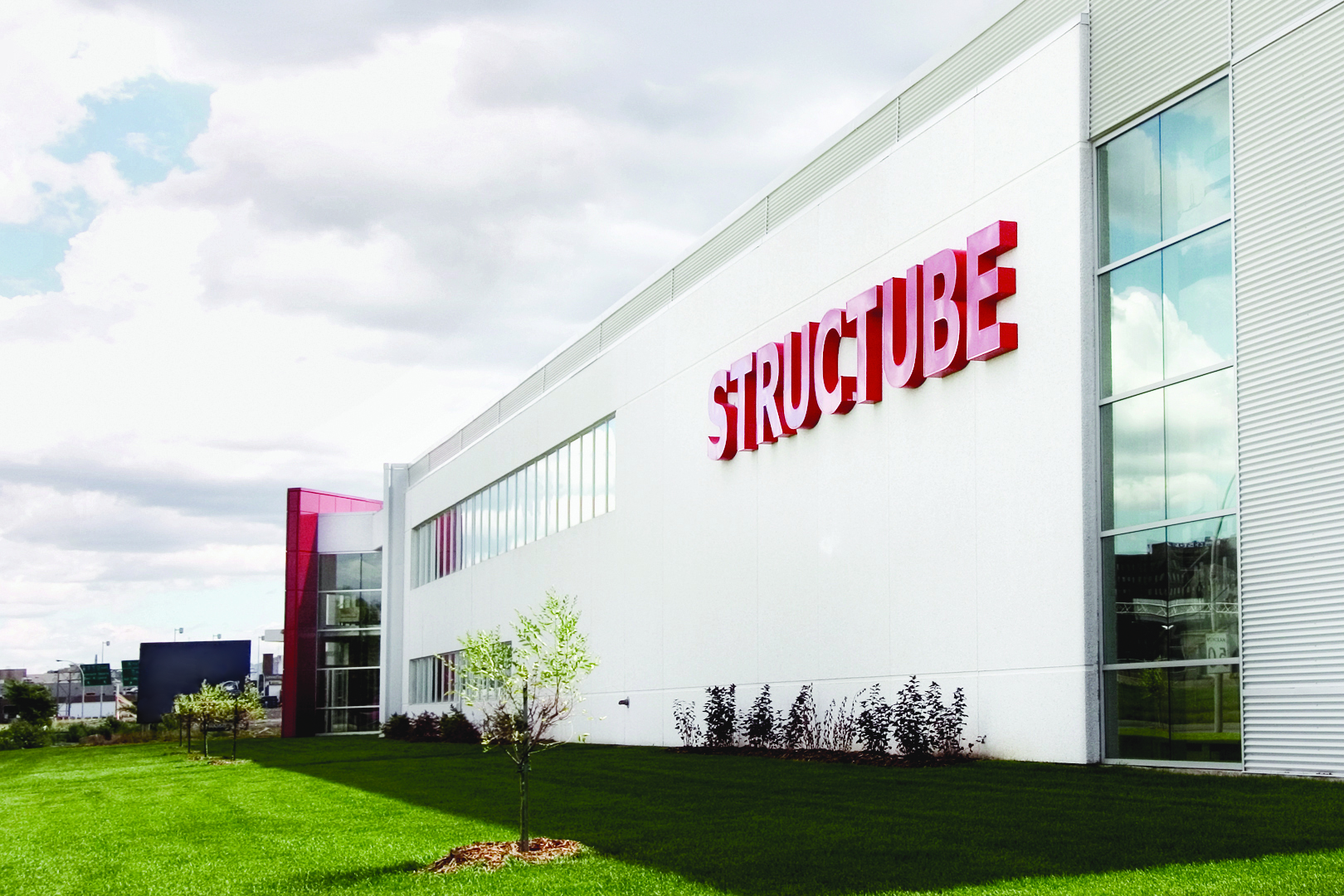
Structube former head office and distribution centre in Montreal

== History ==
Structube was founded in 1974 and specialized in tubular retail clothing racks. The name is a portmanteau of the French words for structural and tubular, "structures tubulaires". It expanded its business into furniture in 1980 in downtown Montreal. A 54,000-square-foot (5,000 m^{2}) distribution centre was built in 2006 and subsequently expanded to 250,000 square feet (23,000 m^{2}) in 2013.

The first store in Alberta was opened in September 2012, and in 2016, three locations were opened in British Columbia. In May 2015, Structube began offering its product line through an e-commerce website integrated with its conventional stores, and in November 2015, expanded this to the United States. Structube later abandoned the U.S. market in May 2019.
