= Blue Route (Nova Scotia) =

Planned cycling route in Nova Scotia, Canada

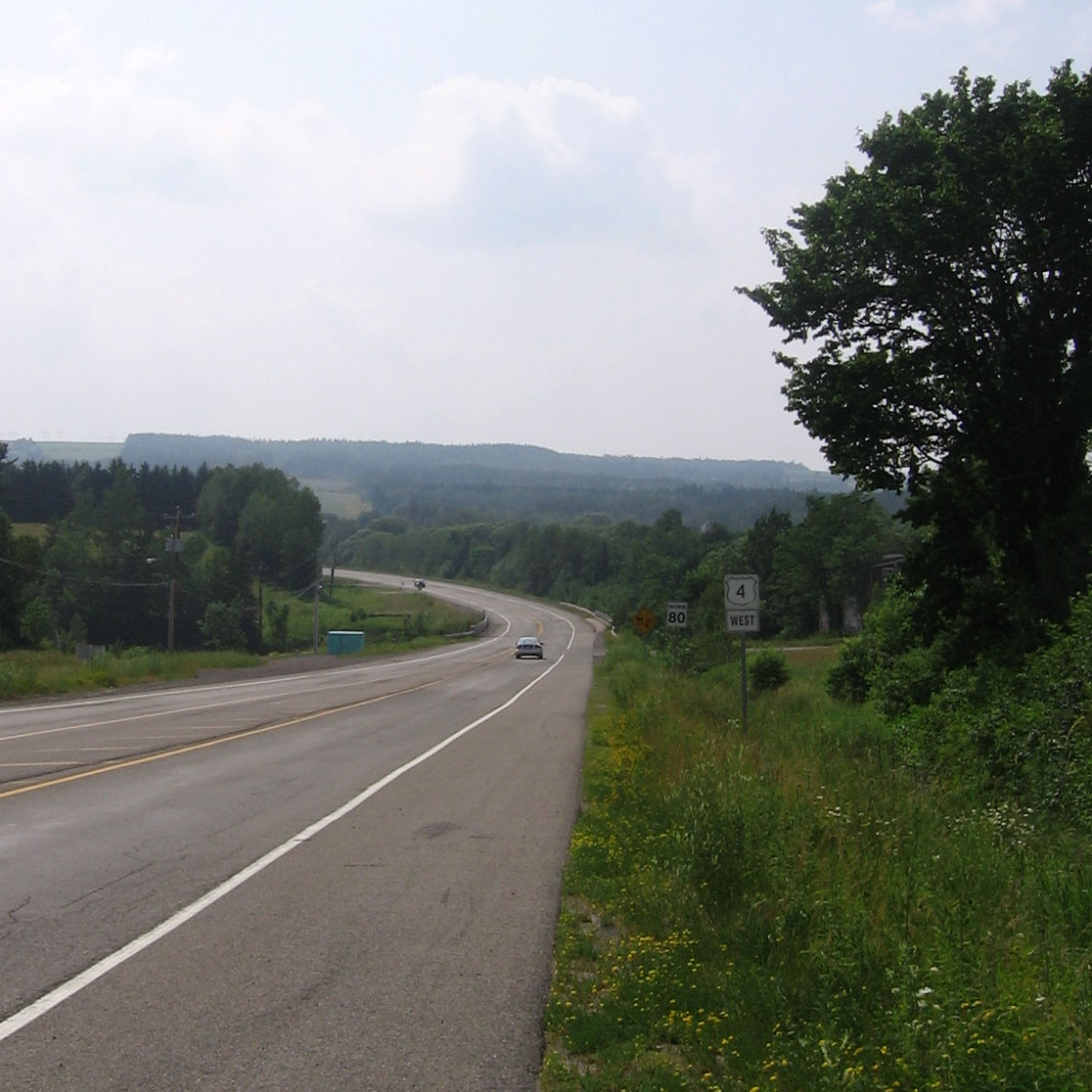
Wide shoulders and low traffic volumes on Trunk 4 outside Alma, make it a candidate to become part of Nova Scotia's Blue Route bicycling system.

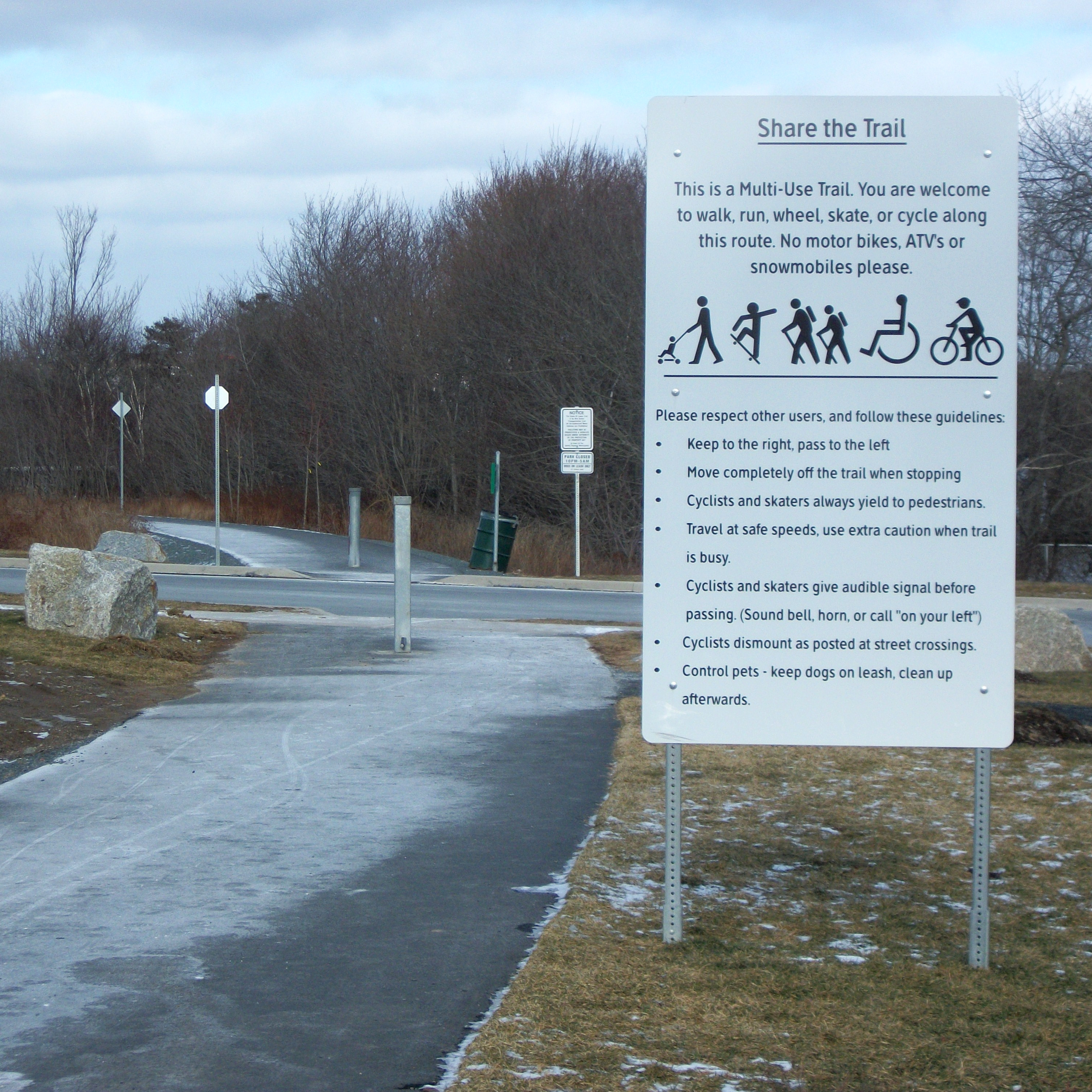
Non-road component of the Blue route in Halifax.

The Blue Route network combines on-road and off-road elements

The Blue Route is a cycling network under development in the Canadian province of Nova Scotia. In 2017, the total length of the cycling network was 437 kilometres (272 mi). When completed it will comprise approximately 3,000 kilometres (1,900 mi) of on- and off-road bicycle routes. The first 56 kilometres (35 mi) section opened in 2015, linking Pictou to Bible Hill, and the whole network is expected to be completed by 2025.
