= German frigate Lübeck (F214) =

Bremen-class frigate

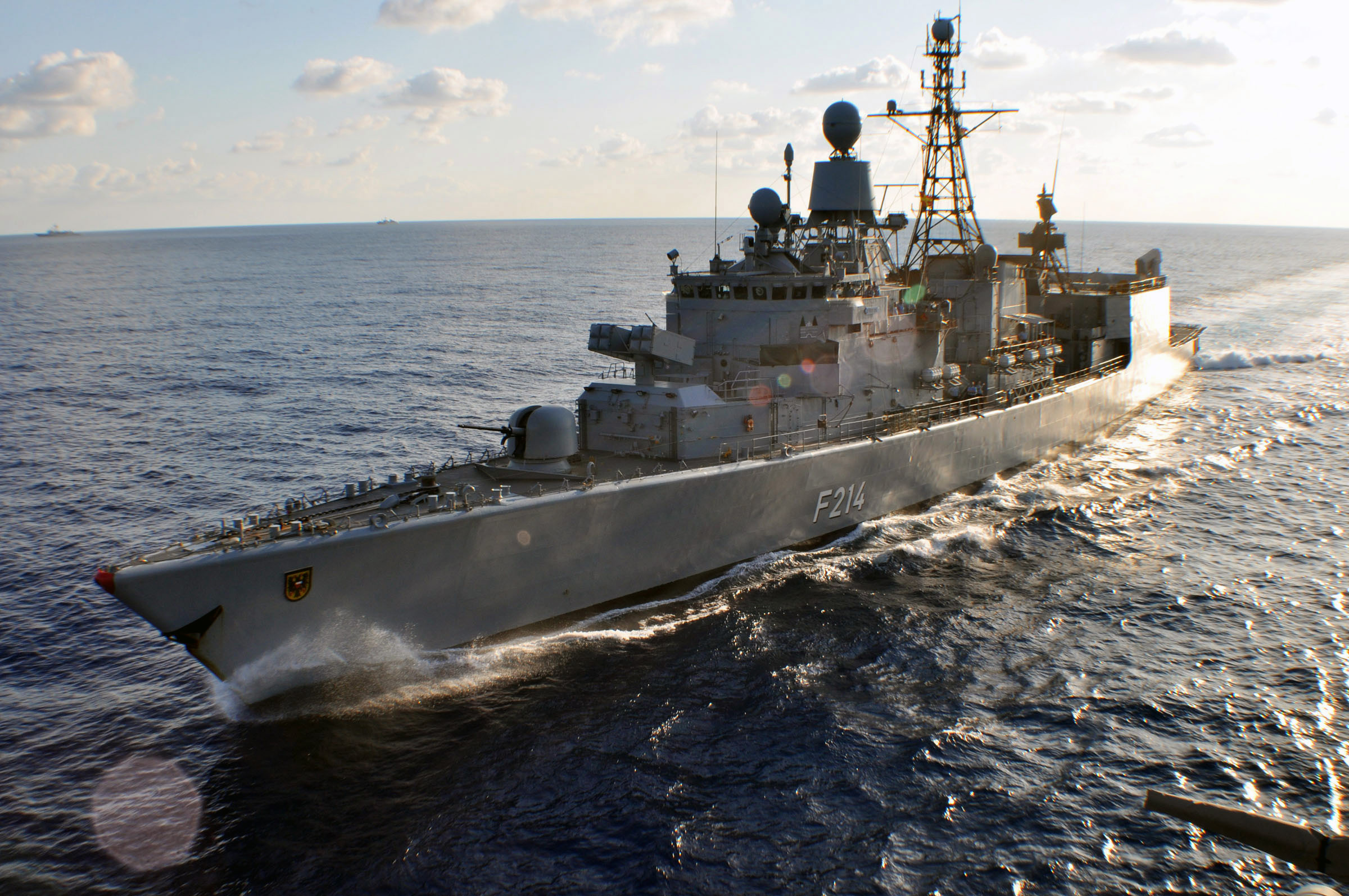
- Lübeck in 2009

History

Germany
- Name: Lübeck
- Builder: Nordseewerke, Emden
- Laid down: 5 June 1987
- Launched: 15 October 1987
- Commissioned: 19 March 1990
- Decommissioned: 15 December 2022
- Identification: Pennant number: F214; MMSI number: 211210210; Call sign: DRAO
- Status: Retired

General characteristics
- Class & type: Bremen-class frigate
- Displacement: 3,680 tonnes (3,620 long tons)
- Length: 130.50 m (428 ft 2 in)
- Beam: 14.60 m (47 ft 11 in)
- Draft: 6.30 m (20 ft 8 in)
- Installed power: CODOG (Combined diesel or gas); 2 × MTU 20V956 TB92 diesel engines, 8.14 MW (10,920 hp) total; 2 × General Electric LM2500 gas turbines, 38 MW (51,000 hp) total; 2 × Renk STG 150-50 gearboxes, 10:1 (diesel) and 720:47 (turbine); 4 × Deutz MWM diesel-generators, 750 kW (1,010 hp)
- Propulsion: 2 × propeller shafts, controllable pitch, five-bladed Sulzer-Escher propellers
- Speed: 30 knots (56 km/h)
- Range: more than 4,000 nmi (7,400 km) at 18 knots (33 km/h)
- Complement: 202 crew plus 20 aviation
- Sensors & processing systems: 1 × EADS TRS-3D air search radar (three-dimensional); 1 × WM 25 combined surface search and fire control radar I/J band; 1 × Thales Nederland STIR 180 fire-control radar I/J/K band; 1 × Kelvin Hughes Nucleus 5000 I band navigation radar; 1 × STN Atlas DSQS-23BZ hull-mounted sonar
- Electronic warfare & decoys: ESM/ECM EADS FL 1800S; 2 × SCLAR decoys; SLQ-25 Nixie torpedo decoy
- Armament: Naval guns: 1 × OTO-Melara 76 mm dual-purpose gun; 2 × Mauser MLG27 27 mm autocannons; Antiaircraft warfare: 1 × 8-cell launch system, 16 × Sea Sparrow surface to air missiles; CIWS: 2 × MK 49 launcher, 21 × RAM each; Anti-ship missiles: 2 × quadruple Harpoon anti-ship missile launchers; Antisubmarine warfare: 2 × Mark 32 324-mm twin torpedo launchers, 8 × DM4A1 or Mark 46 torpedo
- Aircraft carried: Place for 2 Sea Lynx Mk.88A helicopters equipped with torpedoes, air-to-surface missiles Sea Skua, and/or heavy machine gun.

Lübeck was a Bremen-class frigate of the German Navy.

== Construction and commissioning ==
Lübeck was laid in June 1987 at the yards of Nordseewerke, Emden and launched on 15 October 1987 by Rosemarie Knüppel, the wife of the then Mayor of Lübeck Robert Knüppel. After undergoing trials Lübeck was commissioned on 19 March 1990. She was based at Wilhelmshaven as part of 4. Fregattengeschwader, forming a component of Einsatzflottille 2.

== Service ==
After commissioning Lübeck participated in several international deployments. In 1994, 1995 and 1996 she was active in the Adriatic Sea as part of NATO's Operation Sharp Guard, the maritime blockade of the former Yugoslavia during the Yugoslav Wars. In 2003-2004, and again in 2005-2006, Lübeck deployed in support of Operation Enduring Freedom, an anti-terrorism mission. In November 2005 she escorted the cruise ship MS Deutschland through the Gulf of Aden as part of an anti-piracy operation. In July 2007 Lübeck joined the maritime component of the United Nations Interim Force in Lebanon. From 21 August the following year she was part of Standing NATO Maritime Group 1, carrying out routine exercises in the Black Sea and providing a NATO presence off the Georgian coast during the Russo-Georgian War along with the frigates USS Taylor, the Spanish Blas de Lezo and the Polish ORP Generał Kazimierz Pułaski.

In 2007 Lübeck visited HMNB Devonport for a training exercise, during which she sustained slight damage from a shot fired from her own bow gun. In 2009 she participated in the UNITAS Gold exercises. During these, Lübeck fired two RIM-7 Sea Sparrow anti-aircraft missiles at the target ship, the decommissioned destroyer USS Conolly. Between 2009 and 2010 Lübeck underwent an overhaul at Bremerhaven, before returning to service in 2011 with Standing NATO Maritime Group 1, with a temporary detachment to support NATO's Operation Unified Protector during the Libyan Civil War, before deploying under NATO command for Operation Active Endeavour. Lübeck sailed from Wilhelmshaven on 18 November 2011 for a deployment with Operation Atalanta, the EU's anti-piracy mission off the Horn of Africa. On 17 January 2012 she responded to a pirate attack on the MV Flintstone, repelled by the Flintstone's security detachment. Lübeck pursued the dhow used as a mother ship, which had itself been captured by pirates, who were holding its Indian crewmembers hostage. Lübeck fired on the dhow's bow, and used her helicopter to destroy the pirate skiffs being transported aboard the dhow. The pirates then transferred to the MV Enrico Ievoli, a captured Italian tanker, leaving the dhow and 15 hostages to be secured by the Lübeck.

Lübeck carried out manoeuvres with the South African Navy later that year, before returning to Wilhelmshaven via the South Atlantic, arriving on 20 April 2012. She spent 2013 undergoing a refit at Kiel, before returning to Operation Atalanta in autumn 2014. On 21 August 2017 Lübeck departed Wilhelmshaven under the command of Fregattenkapitän Matthias Schmitt to replace the frigate Brandenburg in Standing NATO Maritime Group 2 in the Aegean Sea. Lübeck relieved Brandenburg on the first weekend of September at Souda, Crete.

From January to June 2022, the frigate served on her final deployment to the Aegean. She returned home in June 2022 in advance of her planned decommissioning from service. She was formally decommissioned on 15 December 2022.

== Associations ==
Lübeck has strong associations with her namesake, the historic port city of Lübeck, and visited the city several times. She was present in 2001 for the 600th anniversary of the founding of the Lübeck Schiffergesellschaft. She was again in Lübeck in March 2010, where her crew celebrated the 20th anniversary of her commissioning with a thanksgiving service at the Jakobikirche. Between 1990 and 2010, Lübeck sailed 570,000 nautical miles, participated in 43 missions, manoeuvres and exercises, and visited 124 ports in 38 countries.
