= Target practice =

Shooting weapons at targets

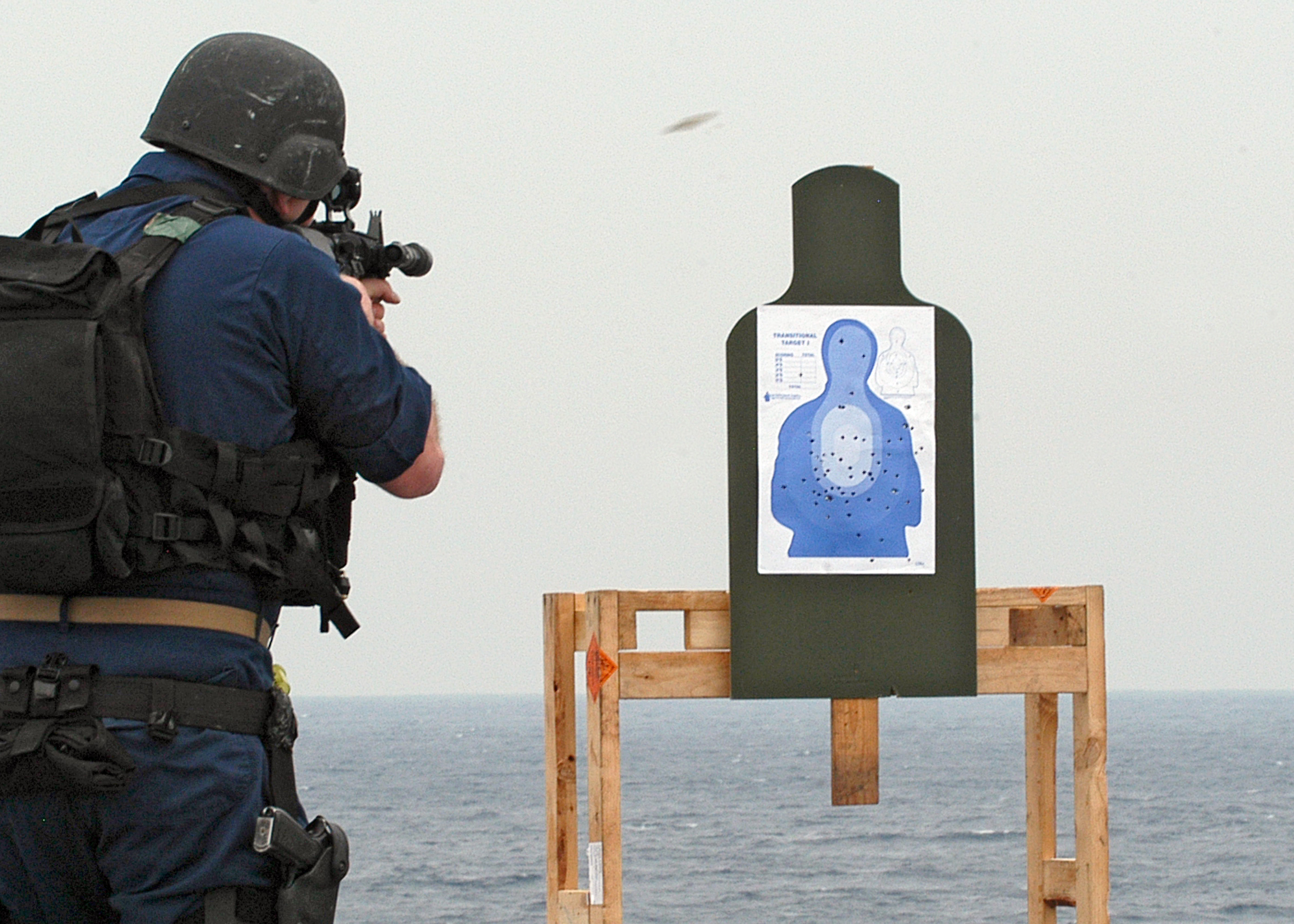
A soldier fires his weapon on a firing range during target practice

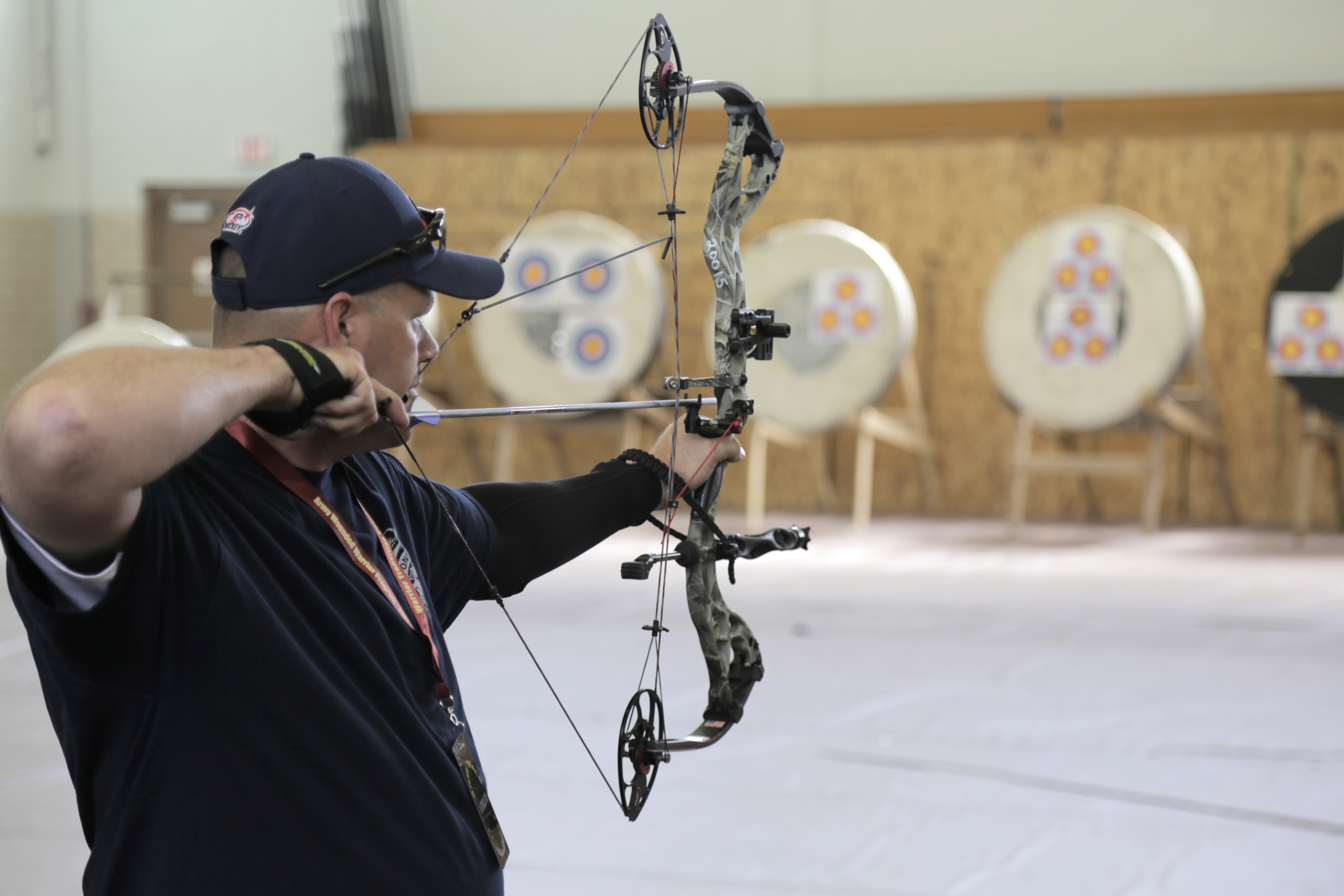
Archery target practice in US Army

Target practice is a key part of both military training and shooting sports. It involves exercises where people shoot weapons at specific targets. The main goal is to improve the shooter's accuracy and skill with firearms. Through repeated practice, participants build essential abilities like aiming, trigger control, and firearm handling. This leads to better overall marksmanship. Target practice also helps assess progress and identify areas for improvement. Ultimately, it's important for both combat effectiveness and success in recreational shooting.

Targets being shot at for practice include:

- with handguns, rifles, and shotguns: shooting targets,
- by air forces or air defense forces: target drones and target tugs,
- by navies: seaborne targets.

== See also ==
- Live fire exercise
- Shooting range
