= Halifax–Dartmouth Ferry Service =

Canadian ferry service in Nova Scotia

Coordinates: 44°38′59″N 63°34′17″W

Halifax-Dartmouth Ferry Service
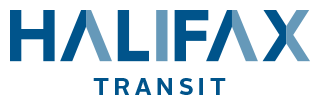

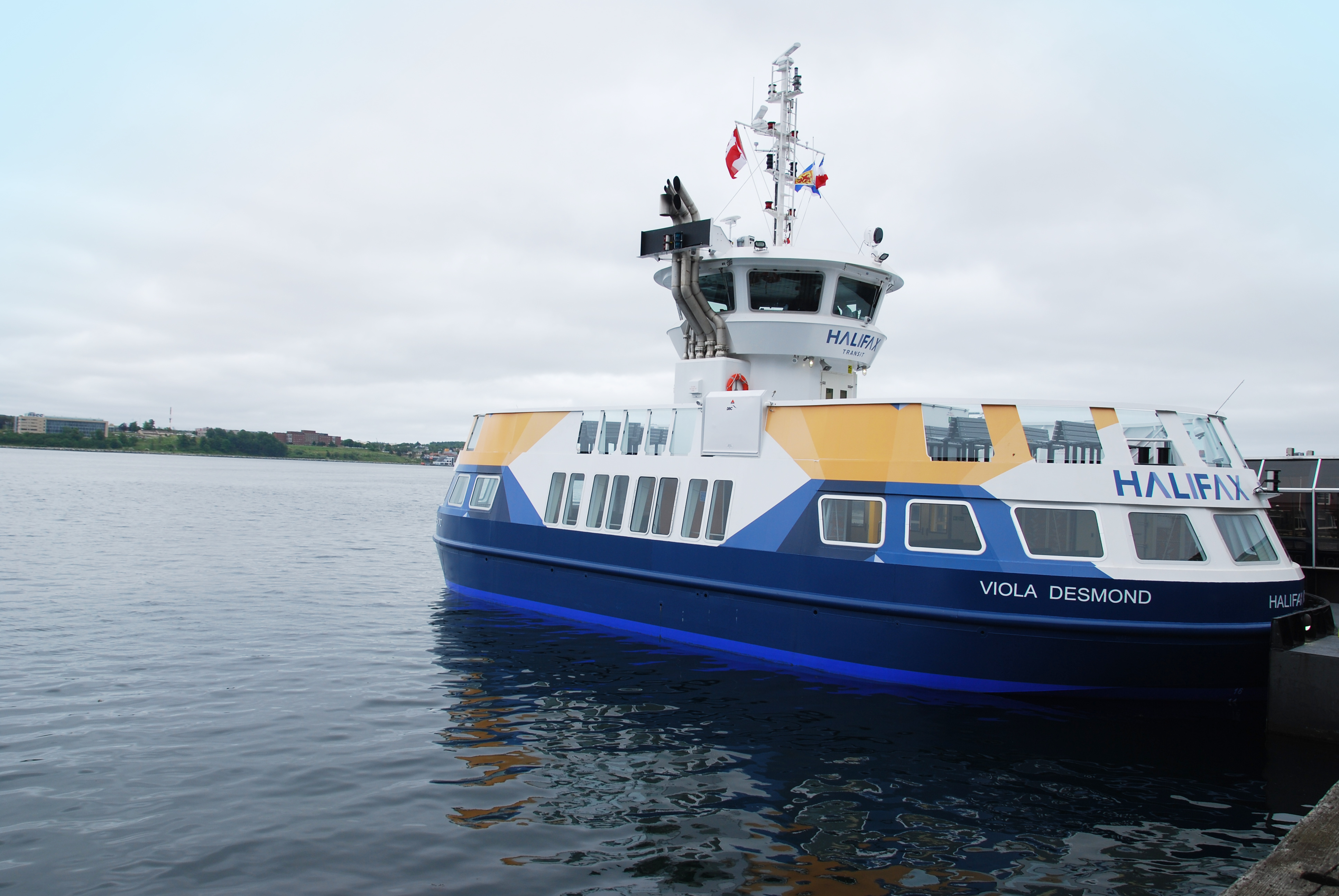
- Locale: Halifax, NS
- Waterway: Halifax Harbour
- Transit type: Passenger ferry
- Owner: Halifax Regional Municipality
- Operator: Halifax Transit
- Began operation: 1752
- No. of lines: 2
- No. of vessels: 5
- No. of terminals: 3
- Website: Ferries

The Halifax–Dartmouth Ferry is the oldest saltwater ferry service in North America, and the second-oldest in the world, after the Mersey Ferry linking Liverpool and Birkenhead. Today, the service is operated by Halifax Transit and connects Downtown Halifax with two terminals in Dartmouth, Alderney Landing and Woodside.

== Origins ==
The first ferry service in the region was established by Halifax founder Edward Cornwallis, who used boats to transport people and raw materials from a sawmill on the Dartmouth side of Halifax Harbour.

In November 1750, the Nova Scotia government appointed John Connor to operate the ferry service. His contract was renewed in February 1752 for an additional three years. This marked the beginning of the official public ferry service between Halifax and Dartmouth.

At the time, regulations stated that the boats would be run from sunrise until sunset through weekdays with a fare of three pence. In these early stages there was no schedule. Patrons would simply walk down to the pier and be taken across as needed. Connor operated the ferry for only one year and after his departure the operation of the ferry changed hands twice more before 1786.

== History ==
The first purpose-built ferry to operate on Halifax Harbour was the Sherbrooke, introduced in 1816. Classified as a horse ferry, it was powered by nine horses walking in a circular motion that drove a central paddlewheel. Compared with its predecessors, the Sherbrooke offered greater speed and capacity for both passengers and cargo.

The Sherbrooke remained in service until 1830, when it was replaced by the harbour's first steam-powered ferry, Sir Charles Ogle.

The ferry remained the only practical means of crossing Halifax Harbour until the opening of the Angus L. Macdonald Bridge in 1955.

The modern ferry system was introduced by the former City of Dartmouth as part of waterfront revitalization projects undertaken in both Dartmouth and Halifax during the 1970s. All five ferries currently in service were designed by Bedford-based E.Y.E. Marine Consultants.

In 1994, the City of Dartmouth transferred operation of the ferry system to Metro Transit, now known as Halifax Transit.

== Current operation ==
Today, Halifax Transit operates two passenger ferry routes, one connecting downtown Halifax with Alderney Landing in Dartmouth (which operates daily) and the other connecting downtown Halifax with Woodside (Monday through Friday only). The ferry crossing between Halifax and Dartmouth spans approximately 2 km across Halifax Harbour. The two ferry routes together see around 5,600 daily weekday passenger boardings (2025). Both routes operate using two vessels each on a fifteen-minute schedule during peak hours, and using one vessel each on a thirty-minute schedule off-peak.

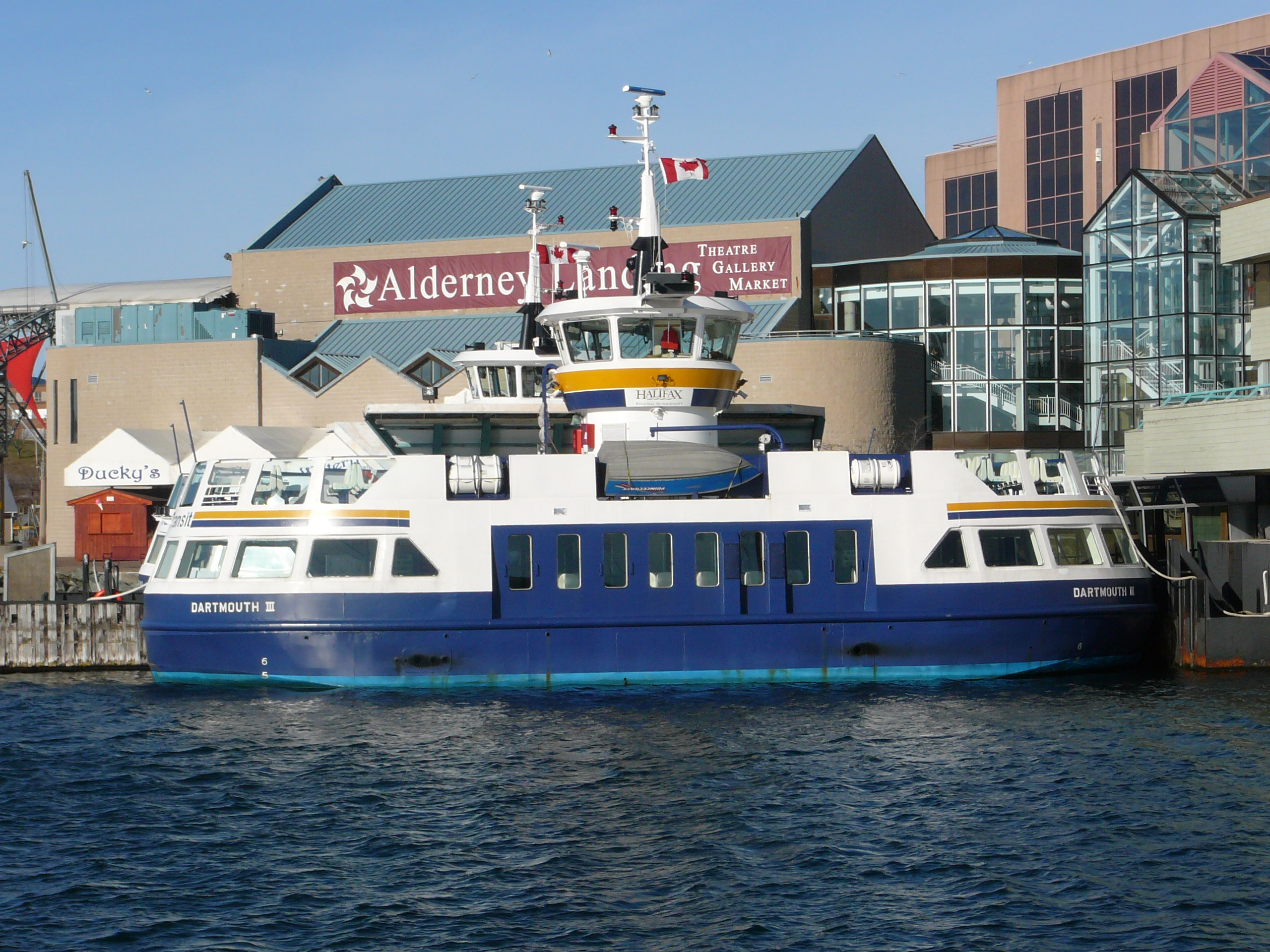
Ferry that runs between Dartmouth and Halifax in Nova Scotia. It is docked at the ferry terminal in downtown Dartmouth. This particular ferry is named the "Dartmouth III". This photo was taken December 25, 2006. IMO number 7801776

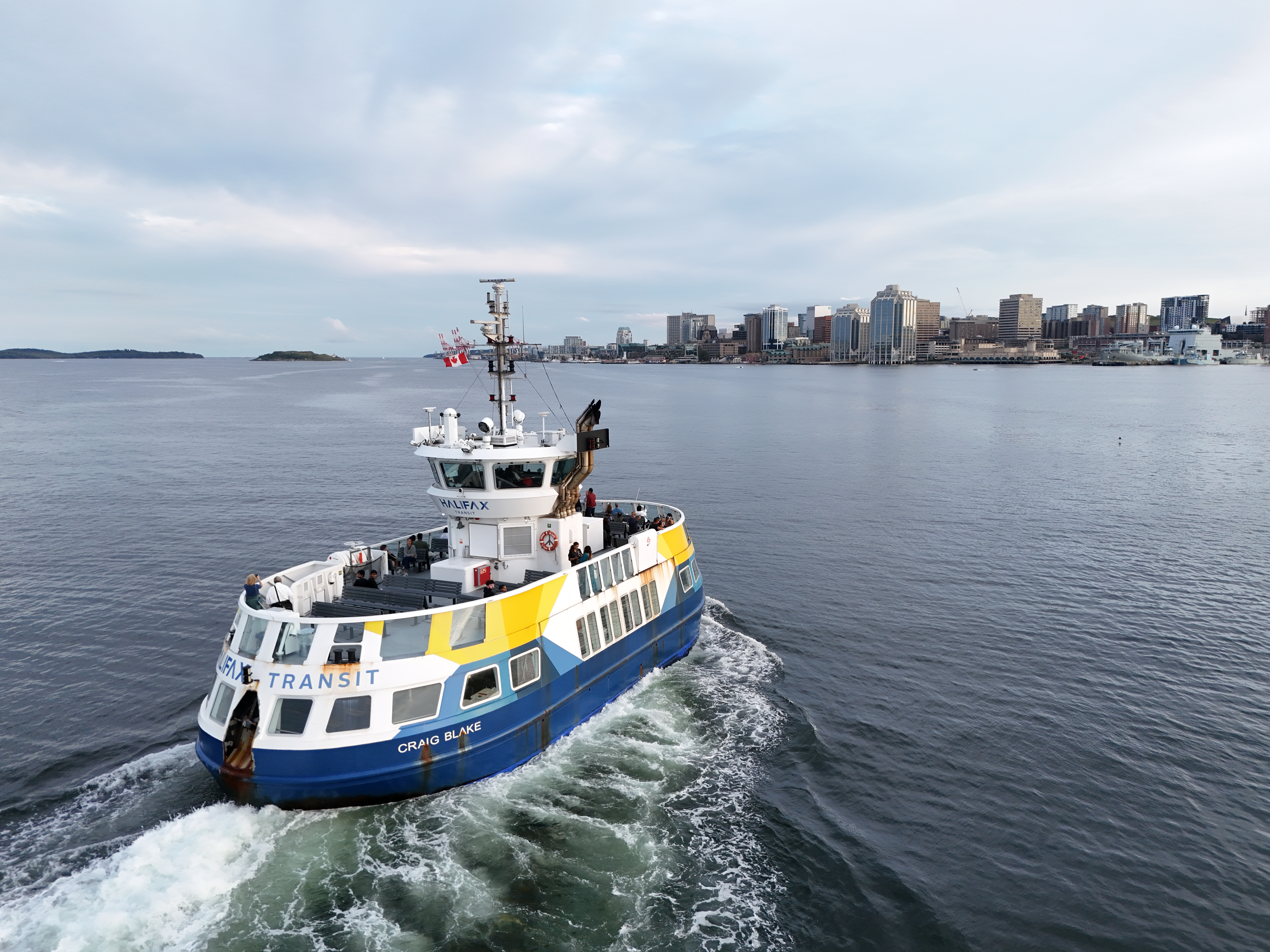
The ferry named "Craig Blake", departing from Alderney Ferry Terminal in Dartmouth.

Name	Built	Built in	Retired	Notes
Rita Joe	2018	A. F. Theriault Shipyard, Meteghan River		In Service - was a Mi'kmaw poet and songwriter, often referred to as the Poet Laureate of the Mi'kmaq people. Rita Joe
Vincent Coleman	2018	A. F. Theriault Shipyard, Meteghan River		In Service - Was a train dispatcher for the Canadian Government Railways (formerly the ICR, Intercolonial Railway of Canada) who was killed in the Halifax Explosion, but not before he sent a message to an incoming passenger train to stop out of range of the explosion. Today he is remembered as one of the heroic figures from the disaster. Vince Coleman (train dispatcher)
Viola Desmond	2016	A. F. Theriault Shipyard, Meteghan River		in service - was a Canadian civil rights activist and businesswoman of Black Nova Scotian descent. In 1946 she challenged racial segregation at a cinema in New Glasgow, Nova Scotia by refusing to leave a whites-only area of the Roseland Theatre. For this, she was convicted of a minor tax violation for the one-cent tax difference between the seat she had paid for and the seat she used, which was more expensive. Desmond's case is one of the most publicized incidents of racial discrimination in Canadian history and helped start the modern civil rights movement in Canada. Viola Desmond
Craig Blake	2015	A. F. Theriault Shipyard, Meteghan River		a Navy petty officer second class from Halifax who was part of an elite navy diving group that specializes in neutralizing bombs. The 37-year-old married father of two was serving with Fleet Diving Unit Atlantic when he was killed by an improvised explosive device in 2010, only a few weeks after he arrived in Afghanistan.
Christopher Stannix	2014	A. F. Theriault Shipyard, Meteghan River		In service—Master Corporal Christopher Stannix was a local army reservist with The Princess Louise Fusiliers. He was killed in April 2007 by an improvised explosive device while serving in Afghanistan. The first new ferry in the fleet in over 25 years. After a 2-stage public naming contest spanning several months, the "Christopher Stannix" name won at 61 % over 4 other worthy names The Princess Louise Fusiliers
Woodside I	1986	Pictou, Nova Scotia	2018	Decommissioned.
Halifax III	1978	Pictou, Nova Scotia	2018	Decommissioned.
Dartmouth III	1978	Pictou, Nova Scotia	2016	Decommissioned. Relocated to Toronto in 2017.

=== Christopher Stannix ===
In early 2013 Halifax Transit announced that they would be purchasing what would be the first of five new harbour passager ferry to augment the now-aging fleet currently in service. The Vessel will be built by A. F. Theriault Shipyard, for a cost of $3,987,400. To maintain compatibility with the existing ferry terminal facilities, the new vessel will use the same hull design first used in the Halifax III in 1979. However, updates are planned for many of the ship's systems as well as the interior. The name of the vessel was chosen by the people of Halifax after a competition conducted by Halifax Transit. At the end of the competition over 12,800 votes were cast with the name Christopher Stannix winning 61% of the votes. MCpl Christopher Stannix was a local army reservist with The Princess Louise Fusiliers. He was killed in April 2007 by an improvised explosive device while serving in Afghanistan.

In early June 2014, the winner of the competition to name the new ferry was announced. (Corporal) Darrel MacDonald, a former member of The Princess Louise Fusiliers and a resident of Halifax, was the first person to submit the "Christopher Stannix" name for voting. He was awarded a full year transit pass and reportedly donated it to the IWK Health Centre (Women and Newborn Health Social Work Department). The passes were converted to sheets of single-use transit tickets and will be passed out at the discretion of the staff within the department.

=== Fleet renewal ===
Following completion of the Christopher Stannix, Halifax Regional Council approved the purchase of two additional new ferries, expected to be delivered in spring 2015 and 2016 respectively. Two aging members of Halifax Transit's existing fleet will be retired when these vessels are delivered. These ferries will be built by A. F. Theriault Shipyard, the same yard responsible for the Christopher Stannix. The first of these two ferries, named the Craig Blake after another Canadian Forces member killed in Afghanistan, entered service in 2015. Another ferry is expected to enter service in 2016, named after Viola Desmond. On December 6, 2016, Regional Council approved the purchase of two more ferries. This purchase will allow the service to operate with two modern, reliable ferries on each routes, and one spare for routine maintenance and unexpected breakdowns.

=== Fast ferry service ===
Following the cancellation of plans for commuter rail service, Halifax Regional Municipality began planning several high-speed ferry routes across Halifax Harbour, including service to Purcell's Cove, Bedford, Eastern Passage and Shannon Park. These routes would be served by wave piercing catamarans capable of speeds of approximately 40 knots. Details have not been finalized, however it is likely that the downtown Halifax terminal would act as a hub, with all routes radiating outward. Studies and trials have been undertaken for a Bedford-Halifax route, which will likely be the first high speed service. On March 4, 2024 it was announced that a ferry service between Bedford and Halifax would happen. 5 High speed catamaran ferries are set to operate the route and a new terminal will be built in Mill Cove and the current Halifax ferry terminal would be renovated. Service is to start some time in 2027 or 2028.

Halifax Transit ferry routes. Yellow lines indicate existing routes, and red lines indicate possible new routes served by high-speed ferries.
