= Hammerhead USV-T =

Target drone used for naval training

The Hammerhead USV-T (Unmanned Surface Vehicle Target) is a remote-controlled, high-speed seaborne target drone used for naval training. The craft is built and produced by Meggitt Training Systems in cooperation with A. F. Theriault & Son Ltd and approximately eighty other companies that produce innards and accessories of the boats. The Hammerhead USV-T is used for tactical training scenarios at sea.

The USV-Ts are being built and designed to replicate the fast inshore attack crafts typically traveling in swarms that are being utilized in some highly unstable regions of the world. They are cost effective as one does not need to man them and they also do not need many physical attributes boats of its caliber would need to be equipped with in order to function similarly. This specific model is used to test the defenses of a ship or be a target / target tow vehicle.

== History ==
In January 2010, the 50th USV-T was made in Canada by A.F. Theriault & Son Ltd.

In July 2025, the Royal Canadian Navy (RCN) used the USV-Ts during live-fire drills under Exercise Trident Fury 2025 in simulating kamikaze drone attacks.

In March 2026 during the Cobra Gold 2026 exercises, the drones were used to train partner nations in neutralizing maritime drones.

== Production ==
In 2010 Meggitt achieved a world first by successful demonstrating to the International Naval Community to be able to control sixteen of their Hammerheads for a period of seven hours. During this time many of the useful applications and equipment designed into the Hammerhead were demonstrated. Since 2010 over 190 units have been sold to Canada, United Kingdom, South Africa, United States, and Germany. Meggitt Training Systems has recently been ranked second among Canada’s leading defense companies.

=== Specifications ===
The boat's hull measures 17 feet (5.2 m) in length and weighs 900 kg. It is equipped with a 3.0L four cylinder engine, capable of propelling it up to 40 knots (74 km/h) at sea. The fuel capacity is 189 liters and the boat has an endurance of up to twenty-four hours at speeds below 20 knots (37 km/h). The Hammerhead can be equipped with smoke, flags, strobe lights, naval navigational lights, flares, and forward looking IR signatures, radar and forward looking video. The equipment is controlled by a UTCS (Universal Target Control System) at a single data half-duplex frequency, allowing them to communicate with up to sixteen vehicles concurrently. One person can be capable guiding and controlling four Hammerhead boats simultaneously, and the craft can also be pre-programmed.
