= Dartmouth III =

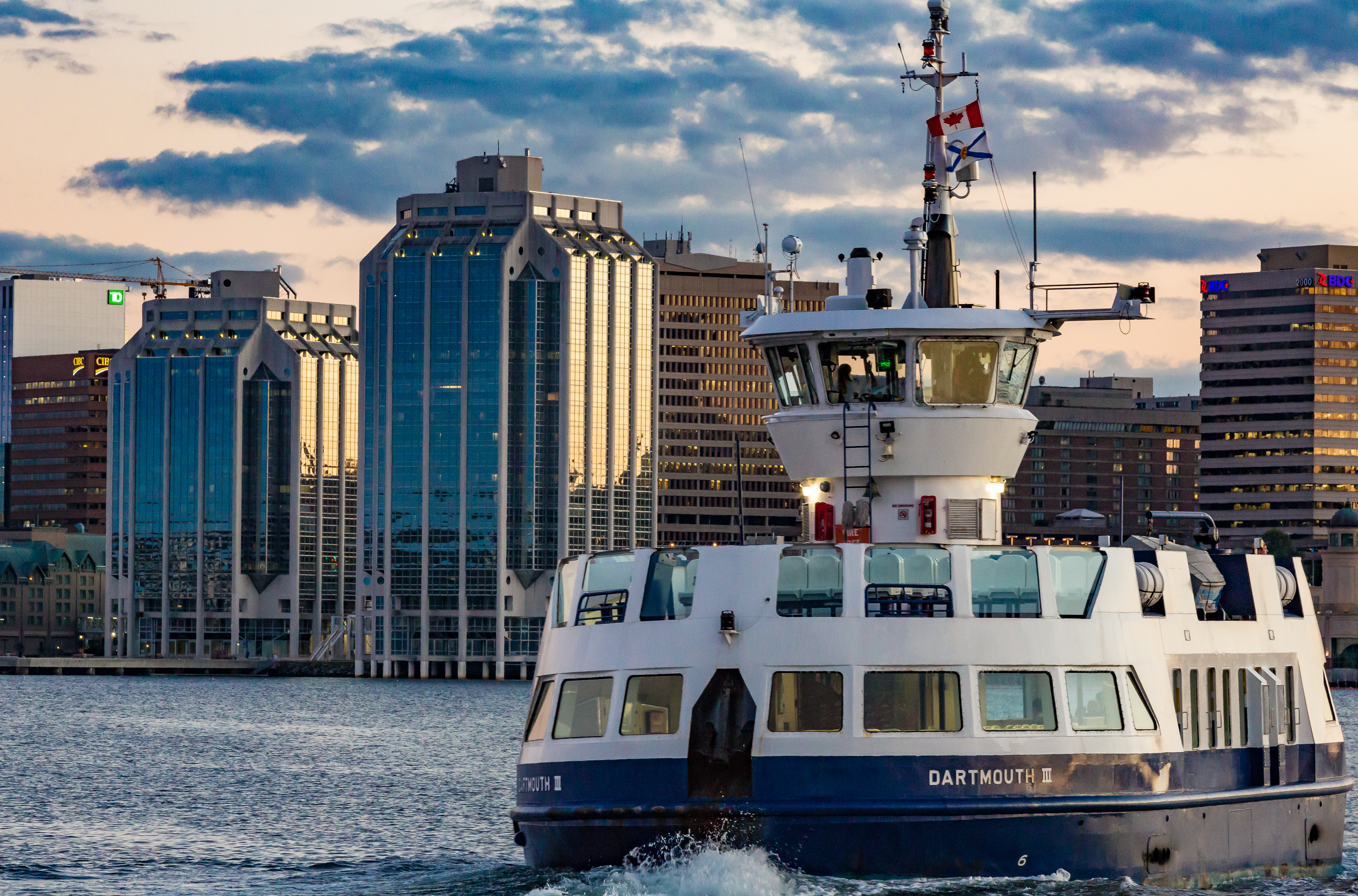
Dartmouth III, transiting Halifax Harbour in 2015.

Dartmouth III is a ferry that served the Halifax–Dartmouth route in Nova Scotia from 1978 to 2016. After the ferry was retired, it was put up for auction, and bought by a Toronto company for service in Toronto.

== Specifications ==
The vessel has two passenger decks, with a small bridge deck above. She has a capacity of 390 passengers. She is propelled by Voith Schneider system.

== Halifax service ==
In 1980 fans of the rock and roll band, April Wine, overcrowded the vessel, following a concert. Passengers described frightening overcrowding, and finding the extra weight made the vessel seem unstable. During the ten minute trip to Dartmouth the fans caused $20,000 worth of damage. Service was suspended and those left at the ferry terminal had to walk across the bridge crossing.

== Toronto service ==
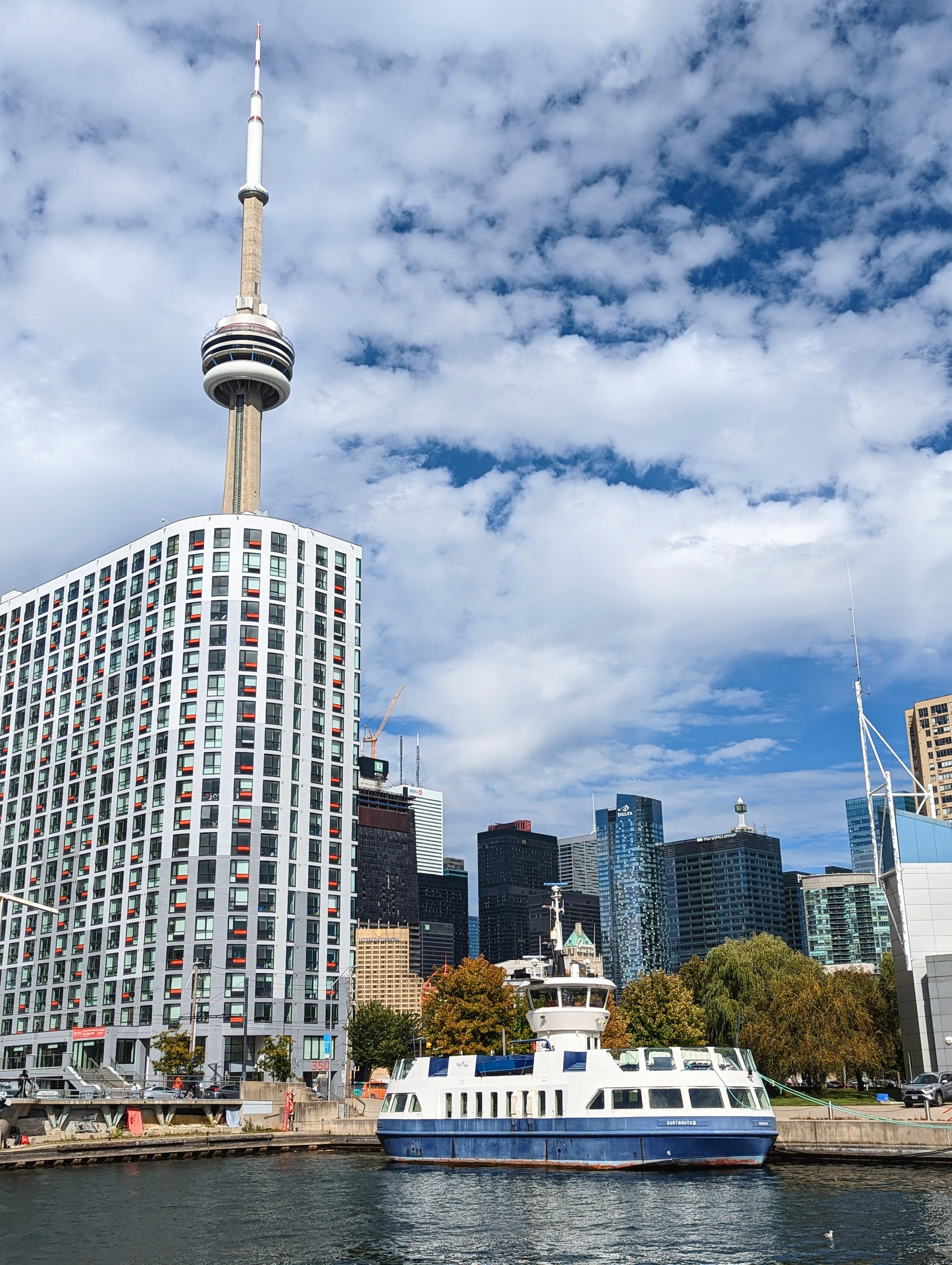
Dartmouth III moored in Toronto, 2022

After she was put up for auction the ferry was purchased by the Toronto Island Transit Service, for $100,000. The plans are for the ferry to operate under a charter, beside the ferries owned by the City.

The vessel was sold for $100,000, by a company that runs an amusement park on Toronto's Centre Island. She started a $500,000 refit, and was expected to begin service in Toronto during the 2018 summer season, but has not been put into service.
