= Sir Charles Ogle =

Ferry that operated from 1830 until 1894

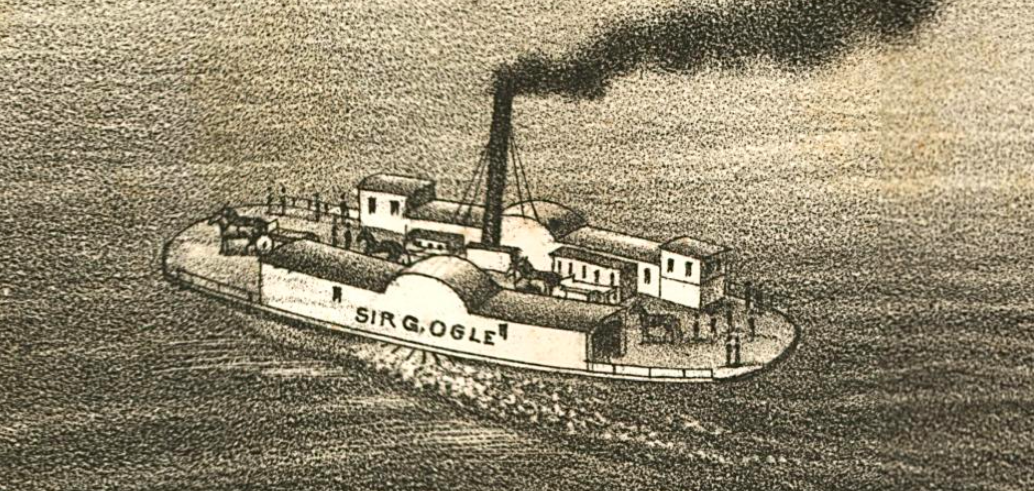
- Sir Charles Ogle, Halifax, Nova Scotia, in 1879

History
- Name: Sir Charles Ogle
- Owner: Halifax-Dartmouth Steamboat Company
- Operator: Halifax-Dartmouth Ferry Service
- Route: Halifax – Dartmouth.
- Builder: Alexander Lyle Shipyard, Dartmouth, Nova Scotia
- Completed: 1830
- Identification: Official No. 75841
- Fate: Sold 1894

General characteristics
- Tonnage: 176 GRT
- Length: 108 feet (33 m)
- Beam: 35 feet (11 m)
- Height: 3.3 m (10.8 ft)
- Installed power: Steam, 30 HP
- Propulsion: Steam, side paddle wheel

Sir Charles Ogle was a ferry that operated from 1830 until 1894 for the Halifax-Dartmouth Ferry Service. The ferry was the first steamship built in Nova Scotia and the longest serving ferry in Halifax Harbour. The ship is named for Royal Navy officer Sir Charles Ogle, 2nd Baronet, who served as Commander-in-Chief of North America and West Indies Station from 1827 to 1830.

== History ==
Construction began on 18 April 1829 in Alexander Lyle's shipyard, and Sir Charles Ogle was launched into Halifax Harbour on New Year's Day 1830. She was 108 feet (33 m) long, 35 feet (11 m) wide, with a beam of 20 feet (6.1 m). Her deck was 108 feet (33 m) feet long and 35 feet (11 m) wide; she measured 176 tons, and her engine produced 30 horsepower.

Sir Charles Ogle was used as a ferry to transport passengers across Halifax Harbour from Halifax to Dartmouth and vice versa for the Halifax Steamboat Company, a firm which provided the ocean liner pioneer Samuel Cunard early experience in steamship operation. She was able to make the trip across the harbour in just seven minutes, a trip that had previously required 20 minutes to an hour. The ferry was in use for over 50 years.

The decline of Sir Charles Ogle began in 1886 with the rise in competition from Chebucto and MicMac, coupled with the rising costs of repairs needed to pass the inspections that had been mandated since 1878. The final blow came about with the creation of the Halifax and Dartmouth Steam Ferry Company, which rendered other Halifax harbor ferries unnecessary. Sir Charles Ogle was sold in 1894 for $200 and converted to a tender fitted with a fumigation apparatus using a sulphur and bichloride mercuric chamber for the Lawlor Island Quarantine Station before being scrapped and replaced by the Minocoa (Salucan II). for disease prevention.
