= American United (fireboat) =

2007 class Robert Allan Ltd. fireboat

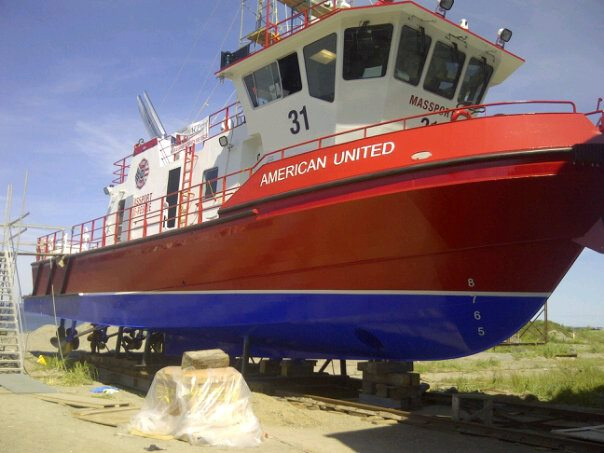
- American United

History
- Name: American United
- Operator: Massachusetts Port Authority
- Awarded: Dec. 28, 2007
- Builder: A.F. Theriault & Son Ltd., Meteghan River
- Sponsored by: Department of Homeland Security
- Acquired: October 11, 2011
- Homeport: Boston, MA
- Identification: MMSI number: 367507210; Callsign: M-31
- Status: Delivered, Not in Service
- Notes: Predecessor: Howard W. Fitzpatrick

General characteristics
- Class & type: Fireboat
- Length: 24 m (79 ft)
- Beam: 6.76 m (22.2 ft)
- Draft: 7 ft (2.1 m)
- Installed power: 2 × 1,450 BHP C32 and 2 × 873 BHP C18 Caterpillar
- Propulsion: 4 × 5 Blade Fixed Pitch Propellers, ZF Reduction Gears.
- Speed: 24 kn (28 mph)
- Boats & landing craft carried: 30 × Switlik life rafts
- Capacity: 2 × 3,000 U.S. gpm firepumps

American United is a Ranger-class Robert Allan Ltd. designed fireboat built to serve the Massachusetts Port Authority as a replacement to Massport Marine Unit 1, the Howard W. Fitzpatrick. It was scheduled to be placed in service in June 2011, and was delivered October 11, 2011, due to the complexity of the build.

== Manufacturing ==
The American United was built by A.F. Theriault and Son Ltd. of Meteghan River, Nova Scotia

== Purpose ==
The vessel is intended to support Logan Airport firefighting, search and rescue, EMS, and Port Security capability.
