= USS Conolly =

Spruance-class destroyer

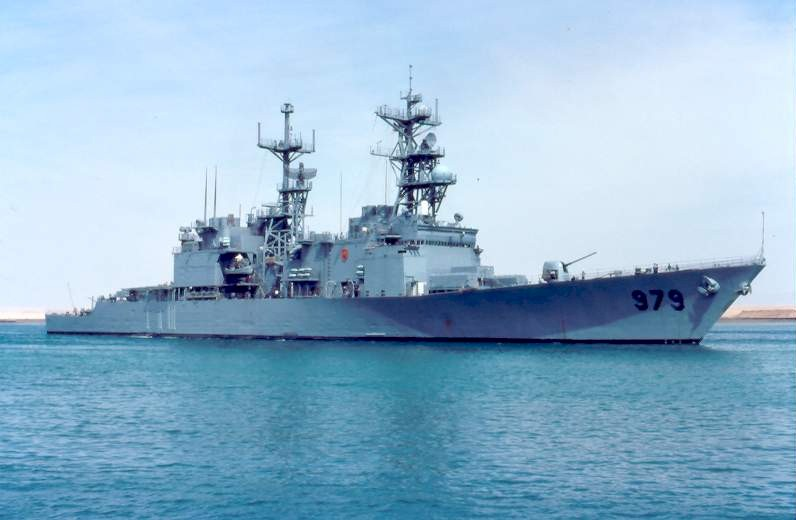
- USS Conolly transiting the Suez Canal summer 1992

History

United States
- Name: Conolly
- Namesake: Richard Lansing Conolly
- Ordered: 15 January 1974
- Builder: Ingalls Shipbuilding
- Laid down: 29 September 1975
- Launched: 3 June 1977
- Acquired: 25 September 1978
- Commissioned: 14 October 1978
- Decommissioned: 18 September 1998
- Stricken: 18 September 1998
- Identification: Callsign: NRLC; Hull number: DD-979
- Motto: Leading The Way
- Fate: Sunk as target, 29 April 2009
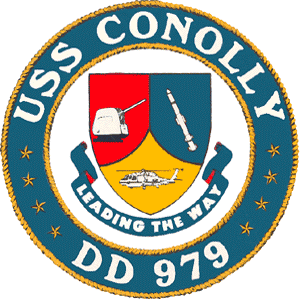
- Badge

General characteristics
- Class & type: Spruance-class destroyer
- Displacement: 8,040 long tons (8,170 t) full load
- Length: 529 ft (161 m) waterline; 563 ft (172 m) overall
- Beam: 55 ft (17 m)
- Draft: 29 ft (8.8 m)
- Installed power: 3 × 501-K17 generator sets (2,000 kW (2,700 hp) each)
- Propulsion: 4 × General Electric LM2500 gas turbines, 2 shafts, 80,000 shp (60 MW)
- Speed: 32.5 knots (60.2 km/h; 37.4 mph)
- Range: 6,000 nmi (11,000 km; 6,900 mi) at 20 knots (37 km/h; 23 mph)
- Complement: 19 officers, 315 enlisted
- Sensors & processing systems: AN/SPS-40 air search radar; AN/SPG-60 fire control radar; AN/SPS-55 surface search radar; AN/SPQ-9 gun fire control radar; Mark 23 TAS automatic detection and tracking radar; AN/SPS-65 missile fire control radar; AN/SQS-53 bow-mounted active sonar; AN/SQR-19 TACTAS towed array passive sonar; Naval Tactical Data System
- Electronic warfare & decoys: AN/SLQ-32 electronic warfare system; AN/SLQ-25 Nixie torpedo countermeasures; Mark 36 SRBOC decoy launching system; AN/SLQ-49 inflatable decoys
- Armament: 2 × 5 in (127 mm) 54 caliber Mark 45 dual purpose guns; 2 × 20 mm Phalanx CIWS Mark 15 guns; 1 × 8 cell ASROC launcher (removed); 1 × 8 cell NATO Sea Sparrow Mark 29 missile launcher; 2 × quadruple Harpoon missile canisters; 2 × Mark 32 triple 12.75 in (324 mm) torpedo tubes (Mk 46 torpedoes); 1 × 61 cell Mk 41 VLS launcher for Tomahawk missiles
- Aircraft carried: 2 × Sikorsky SH-60 Seahawk LAMPS III helicopters
- Aviation facilities: Flight deck and enclosed hangar for up to two medium-lift helicopters

USS Conolly (DD-979), named for Admiral Richard Lansing Conolly USN, was a Spruance-class destroyer built by the Ingalls Shipbuilding Division of Litton Industries at Pascagoula, Mississippi.

== History ==
Conolly was laid down 29 September 1975, launched 19 February 1977, and commissioned 14 October 1978.

=== 1980s ===
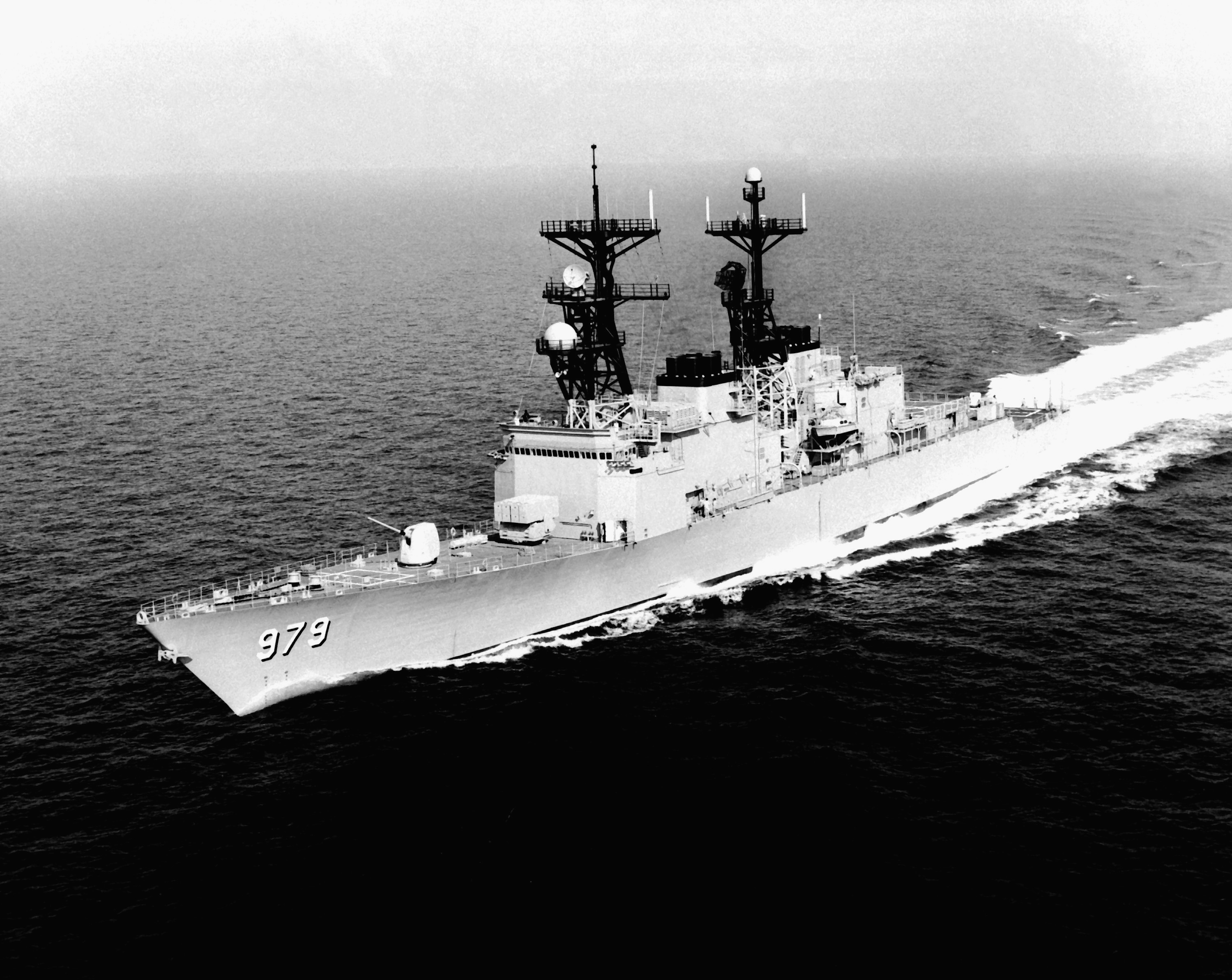
USS Conolly in 1982

From August to December 1980, Conolly deployed as part of the Middle East Force. She deployed as part of this force again from October 1981 to February 1982. In approximately May 1982, Conolly cruised to the U.S. Virgin Islands from U.S. Naval Base Roosevelt Roads, Puerto Rico. While in the USVI, Conolly suffered a cracked bow sonar dome that required her return, under her own power, to Newport News Shipyards for repairs. While in route to Newport News, Conolly experienced a fire in one of the engineering spaces, which the ship's damage control fire fighters promptly contained. Upon arrival in Newport News, Conolly was repaired in dry docks. In September 1982, she deployed to the Mediterranean including operations off the coast of Lebanon.

In June 1983 Conolly deployed again participating in UNITAS XXIV, an annual exercise working with partner navies in South America. Conolly made multiple port visits and worked with a variety of South American navies before returning home in December of the same year. Conolly was the flagship for the cruise, with the staff of Commander, South Atlantic (COMSOLANT), Rear Admiral Clint Taylor, USN, embarked.

Due to equipment casualties in the engineering plant while on the east coast of Chile, the crew had to repair in place the pneumatic clutch-brake assemblies on the two forward gas turbine engines, the second repair having to be completed at sea en route Montevideo, Uruguay. Once in port, the damaged LM-2500 Gas Turbine Main Engine was replaced in 82 hours, using a large floating crane in the port facility.

In addition to the UNITAS cruise, Conolly left Brazil in November and sailed, initially in company with Jesse L. Brown, east to conduct a West African Training Cruise (WATC). Conolly visited Liberville, Gabon; Lagos, Nigeria; Monrovia, Liberia and finally Dakar, Senegal, before transiting west to Roosevelt Roads, PR for a refueling stop before returning to her homeport of Norfolk, VA in mid-December, 1983.

While sailing from Brazil, Conolly was required to conduct a transfer of fuel, while underway, to the Jesse L. Brown, so that ship would have sufficient fuel to make her port call in Equatorial Guinea. Conolly was the first Spruance-class vessel to complete such a task, which was not an assigned capability for the ships. Approximately 30,000 gallons were sent to the Brown using 2 1/2" fire hoses to deliver the fuel, taking about 4 hours.

In February, 1984, Conolly sailed to Portland, ME, to enter a regular overhaul (ROH) at the newly opened Bath Iron Works facility. The overhaul lasted 10 months, during which Conolly was fitted with the Tomahawk Weapons System. Also installed was the MK 15 Close in Weapons System and the Mk 23 Target Acquisition System. During the yard period, Commander Harry Maixner was relieved by Commander Gary Voorheis as Captain of the ship.

In October 1985 Conolly once again deployed as part of the Middle East Force. During this deployment "Conolly" was involved in the boarding of an American flagged ship by the Iranian Navy. She returned from this deployment in April 1986. In June 1987 she made another deployment to the Mediterranean and followed this up with two more deployments in 1989 as part of the Middle East Force, and 1992 MIF (Maritime Interception Force)during Iraq war.

=== 1990s ===
Conolly spent January 1991 at Metro Machine (now General Dynamics NASSCO) in Norfolk, Virginia for a regular overhaul (ROH).

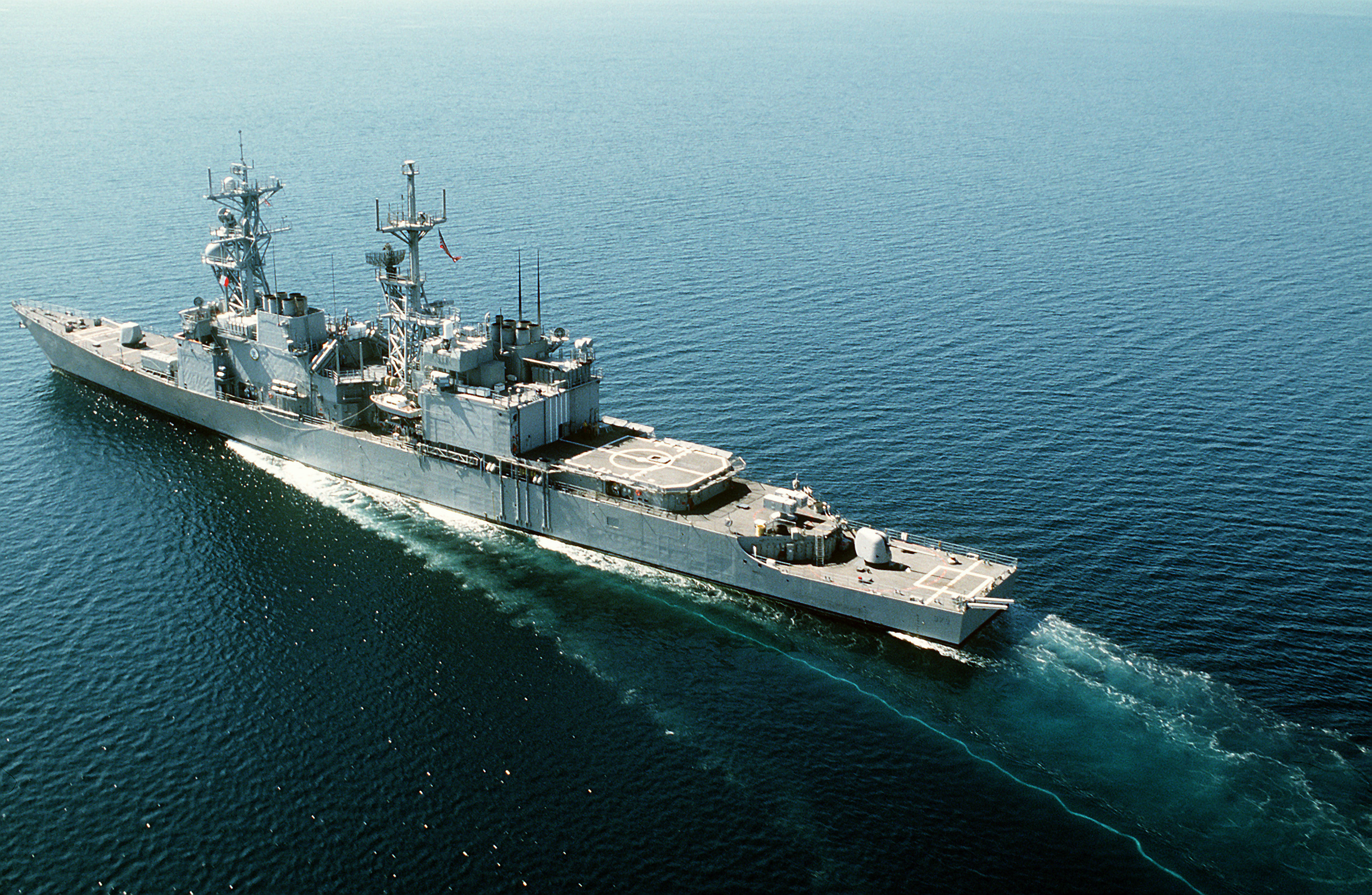
USS Conolly off Haiti in 1993

In 1993, Conolly was deployed in support of Operation Uphold Democracy, enforcing United Nations sanctions against Haiti.

From 6 to 10 June 1994, Conolly participated in World War II commemoration activities at Cavalaire-sur-Mer, France.

That same year, Conolly deployed to the Arabian Peninsula, conducting maritime interception operations in the Red Sea in support of United Nations sanctions against Iraq. During that deployment, on 12 July 1994, Conolly came to the rescue of sixty-two crewmembers of the Panamanian-registered ferry Al Loloa following a fire on board the ferry. Conolly answered the vessel's distress call and proceeded to the scene of the fire. Sixty-one of the ferry's all Egyptian crew had already abandoned ship and were found safe in five life rafts. A survey team from Conolly boarded the Al Loloa and found the fire out of control. Before returning to Conolly, the survey team found the missing crewmember unharmed.

As part of a reorganization announced in July 1995 of the U.S. Atlantic Fleet's surface combatant ships into six core battle groups, nine destroyer squadrons and a new Western Hemisphere Group, Conolly's homeport was changed from Norfolk, Virginia, to Mayport, Florida, with the shift to occur in 1996–1997.

Conolly deployed with the USS George Washington carrier battle group, on 26 January 1996 for a regularly scheduled deployment. The previous December, the battle group and ARG participated in Joint Task Force Exercise 96–1, their "final examination" before deployment, and the culmination of a year of intense preparation.

While deployed, Conolly took part in the Ships Anti-Submarine Warfare Readiness Effectiveness Measuring 114 (SHAREM) Invitational Exercise 1-96 (INVITEX), held 23 – 29 February. SHAREM 114 was a U.S. 6th Fleet naval exercise conducted in the Gulf of Valencia off the east coast of Spain.

Following the completion of Operation Destined Glory 96, a NATO amphibious exercise, Conolly paid a visit to Augusta Bay, Sicily. Operation Destined Glory 96, lasted 16 days and was a NATO forces combined amphibious exercise which began 13 March and continued through 26 March. It tested forces in the air and at sea in the Central Mediterranean near Sardinia and in the Tyrrhenian Sea and also trained ashore at Capo Teulada, Sardinia. Military units from the NATO countries of Greece, Italy, Netherlands, Spain, Turkey and United States took part in the exercise which focused on undersea, surface, electronic and air warfare, and included communications and shiphandling skills.

On 11 April, Conolly was tasked with escorting USS Guam, USS Trenton and USS Portland to Liberia from the Adriatic Sea in support of JTF Assured Response. Guam, Trenton, Portland and Conolly were conducting routine training when they were directed to the coastal waters off Liberia.

Conolly also assisted in search and rescue efforts when the airplane carrying United States Commerce Department Secretary Ron Brown crashed. It participated in Operation Sharp Guard, enforcing United Nations Security Council resolutions in the former republics of Yugoslavia. While on station, Conolly queried 121 merchant vessels, ensuring no contraband cargo entered the troubled region.

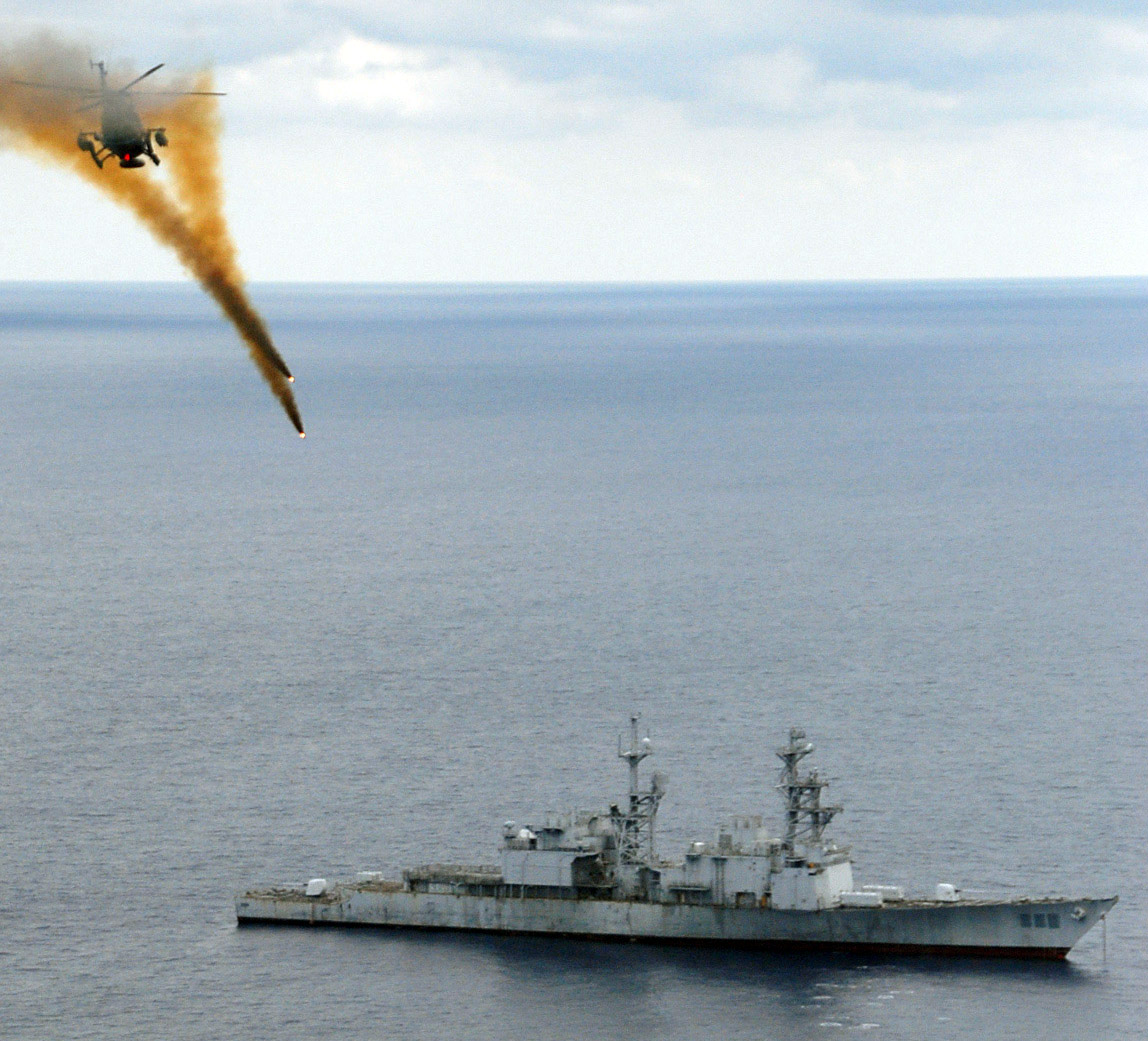
A Mexican Navy helicopter fires at ex-Connolly on 29 April 2009

In June 1996, Conolly took part in Exercise TAPON 96, an allied exercise held in the Alboran Sea, Gulf of Cadiz and the eastern Atlantic Ocean. Conolly conducted combined warfare exercises with the Spanish aircraft carrier Principe de Asturias, and other surface ships including the Spanish frigates Baleares, Santa Maria, Numancia, the Greek destroyer Formion, the Spanish submarine Delfín and the US submarine Grayling. Conolly participated in the nine-day exercise which emphasized procedures and tactics for effective maritime choke-point control. Conolly also completed live-firing exercises in the Central Mediterranean Sea at Avgo Nisi gun-firing range, a small island north of Crete, Greece. She then traveled toward Sicily and conducted a torpedo-firing exercise.

In March 1997, Conolly moved its homeport from Norfolk, Virginia to Mayport, Florida.

== Decommissioning and disposal ==
Conolly was decommissioned 18 September 1998 and laid up at Philadelphia Naval Intermediate Ship Maintenance Facility. An effort to preserve her in Illinois failed after it was unable to acquire the needed funds. Ex-Conolly was sunk as a target off Florida on 29 April 2009 as part of UNITAS Gold, a multinational naval exercise.

== Awards ==
- 3 × Battle Efficiency Awards for 1994, 1995 and 1996
- The National Defense Service Medal presented for service during Operation Desert Storm
- 2 × Joint Meritorious Unit Awards 1 November 1991-January 11, 1992, & 1997
- 12 × Sea Service Deployment Ribbon presented for each of her deployments
- Humanitarian Service Medal presented during UNITAS XXIV – June through December 1983
- 2 × Southwest Asia Service Medals presented for Middle East Force/North Red Sea deployments for March through September 1992, and March through September 1994.
- Kuwait Liberation Medal
- NATO Service Medal presented during Yugoslavia operations October through December 1996.
- Armed Forces Service Medal presented for Operation Joint Endeavor during Mediterranean deployment January through July 1996
- Armed Forces Expeditionary Medal presented for Middle East Force Deployment 27 April through 16 August 1989

== Gallery ==
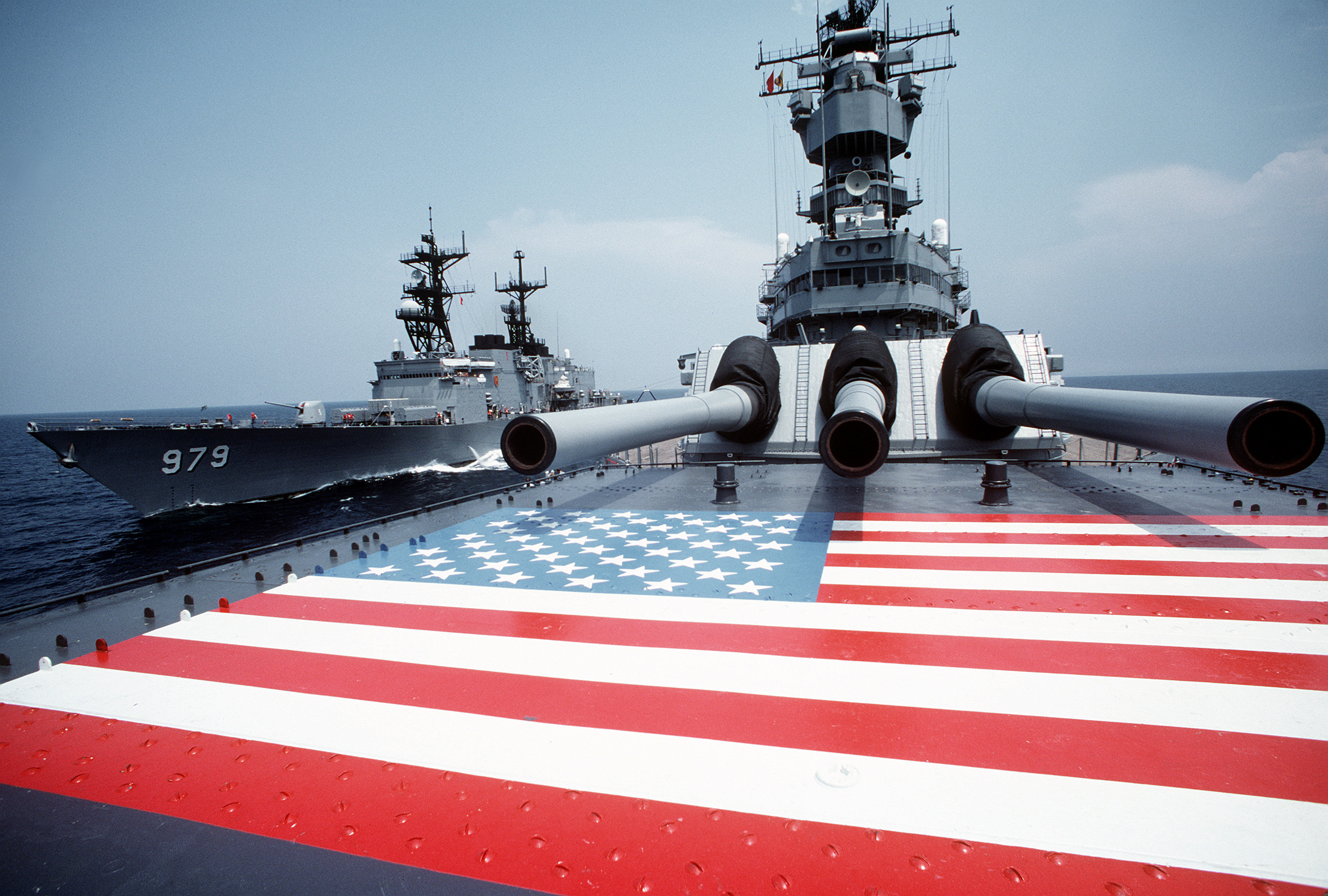
USS Conolly and USS Iowa on 1 August 1986

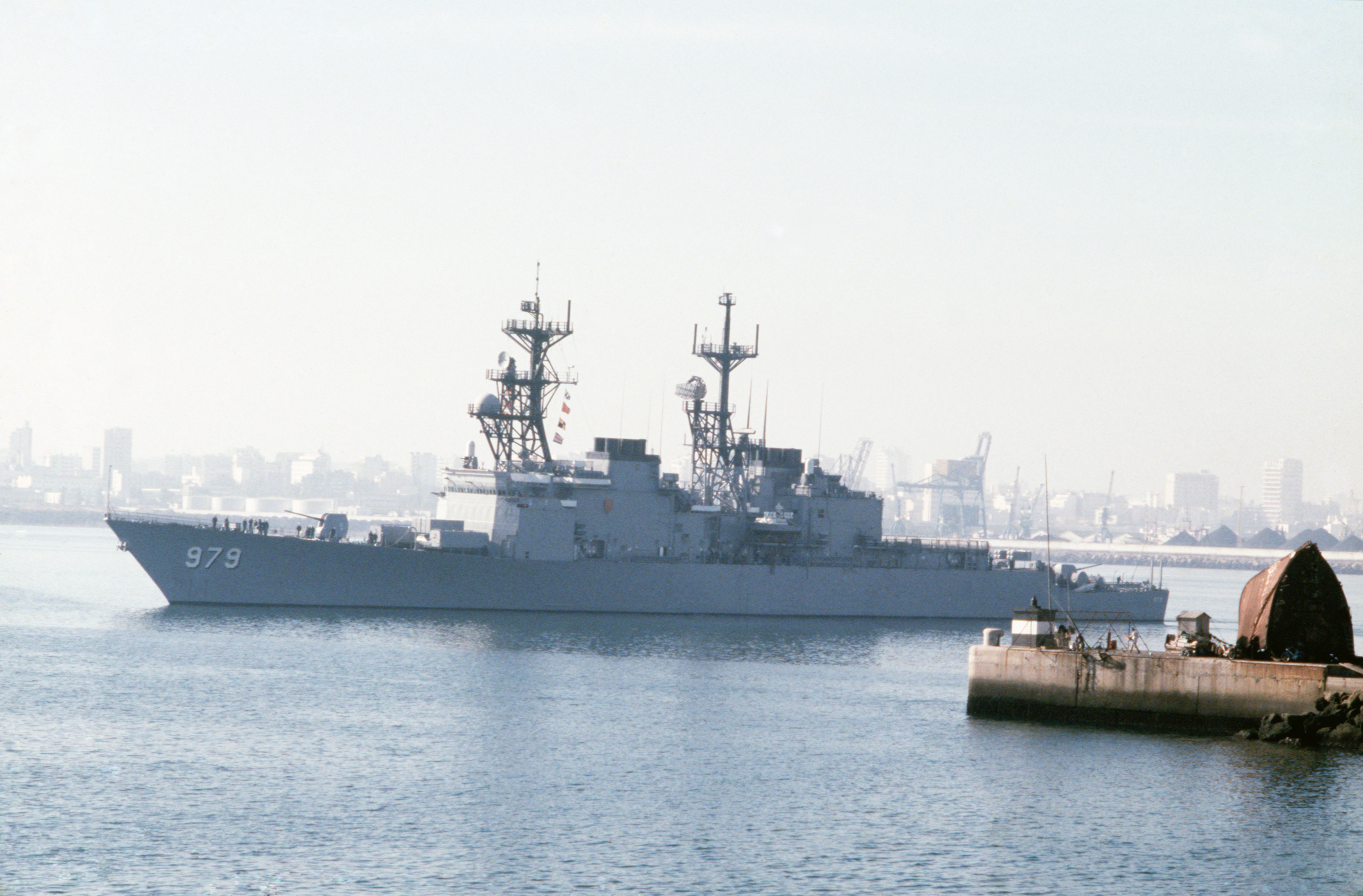
USS Conolly on 1 November 1987

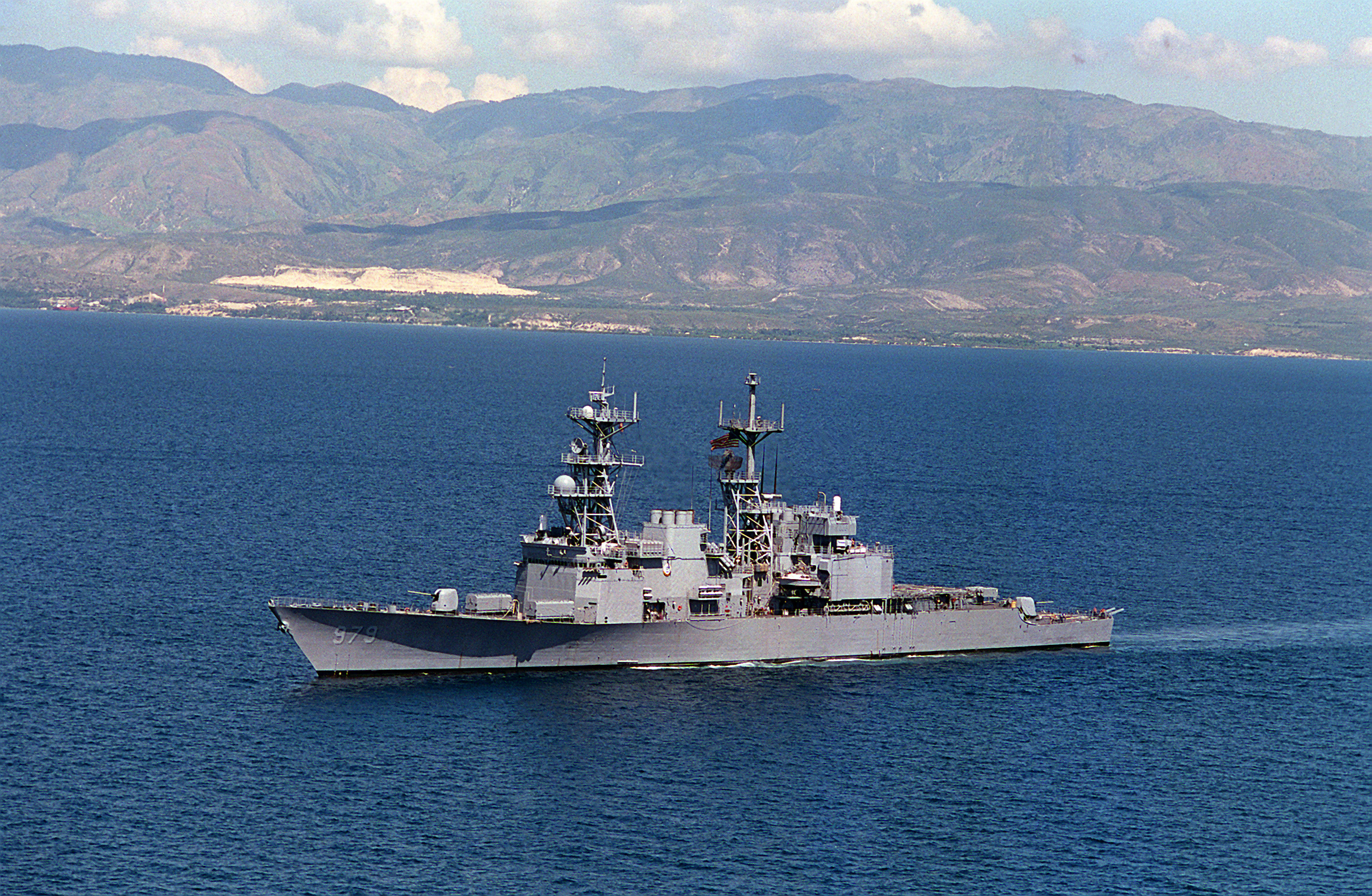
USS Conolly off Port-au-Prince on 31 October 1993

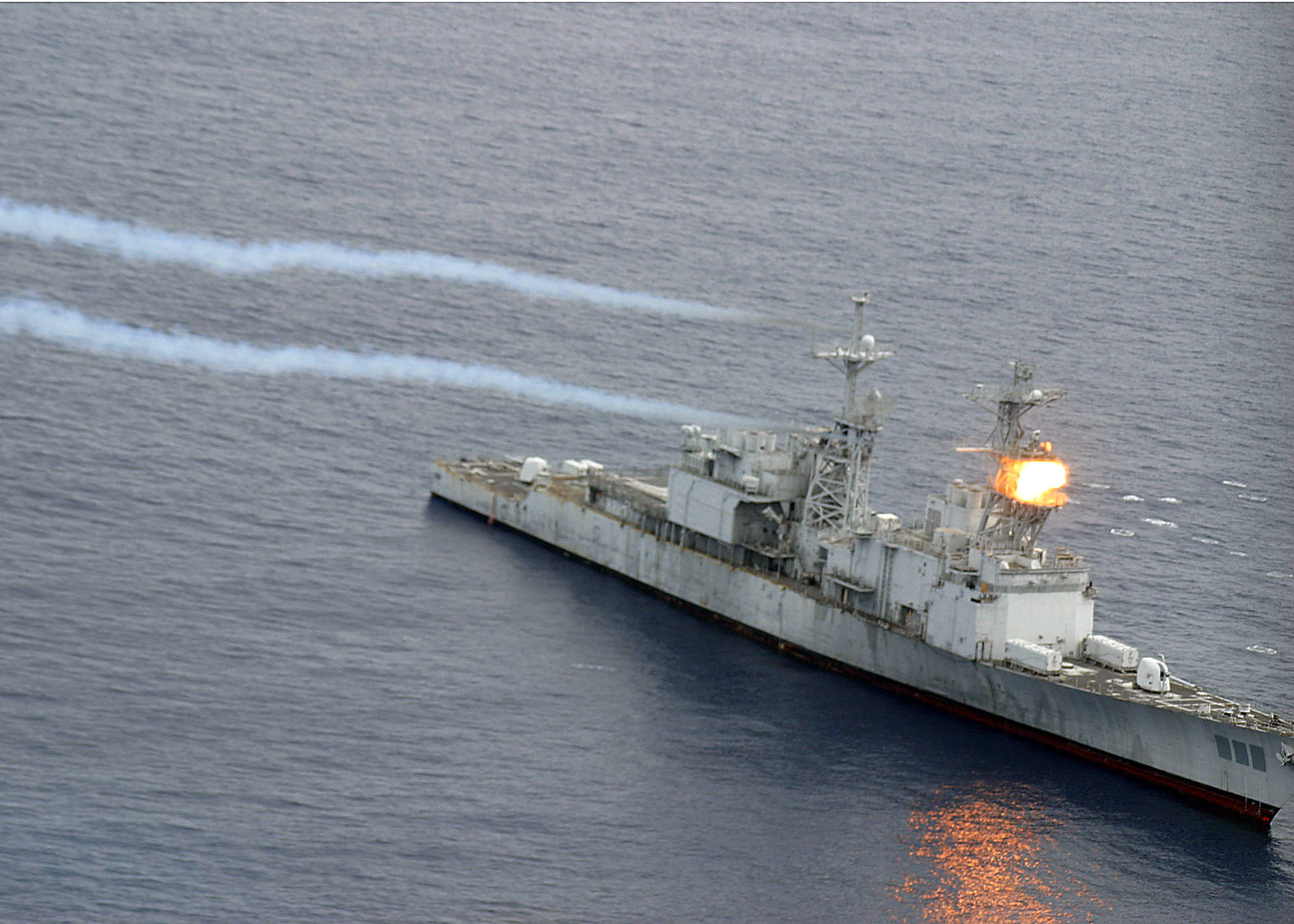
USS Conolly on 29 April 2009
