= UNITAS Gold =

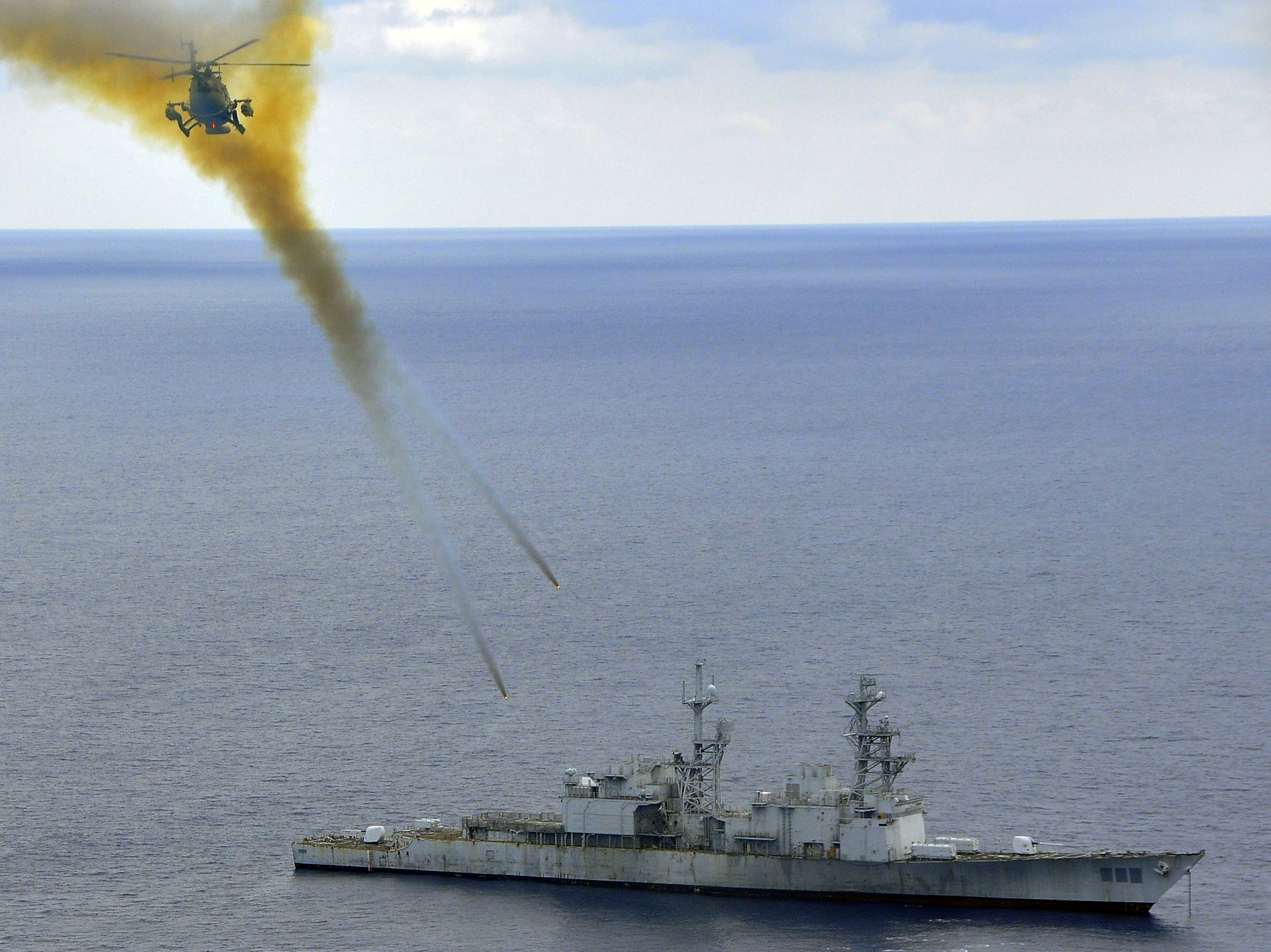
A Mexican helicopter firing rockets at the former USS Conolly during UNITAS Gold in 2009

UNITAS Gold was the 50th iteration of UNITAS, which began in 1959 and is the longest-running multilateral maritime exercise. The 2009 exercises included 25 ships and 70 aircraft from 12 nations and was the 50th time the operation was conducted.

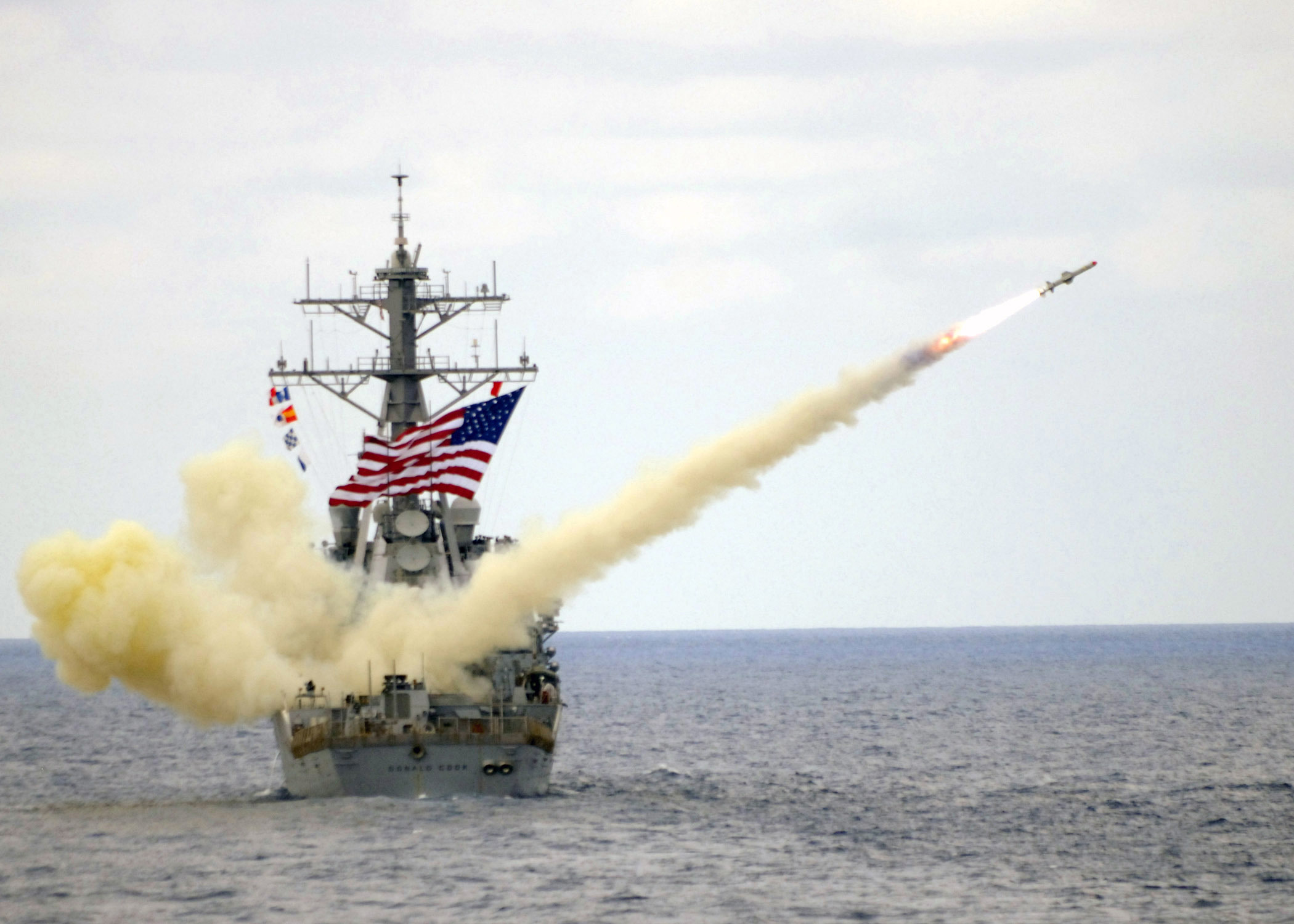
A Harpoon missile is launched from the guided-missile destroyer USS Donald Cook during the sinking exercise portion of UNITAS Gold.

Rear Admiral Joseph D. Kernan, then-Commander, U.S. Fourth Fleet and U.S. Naval Forces Southern Command, remarked that UNITAS helps "nations coordinate efforts to oppose the scourge" of piracy.

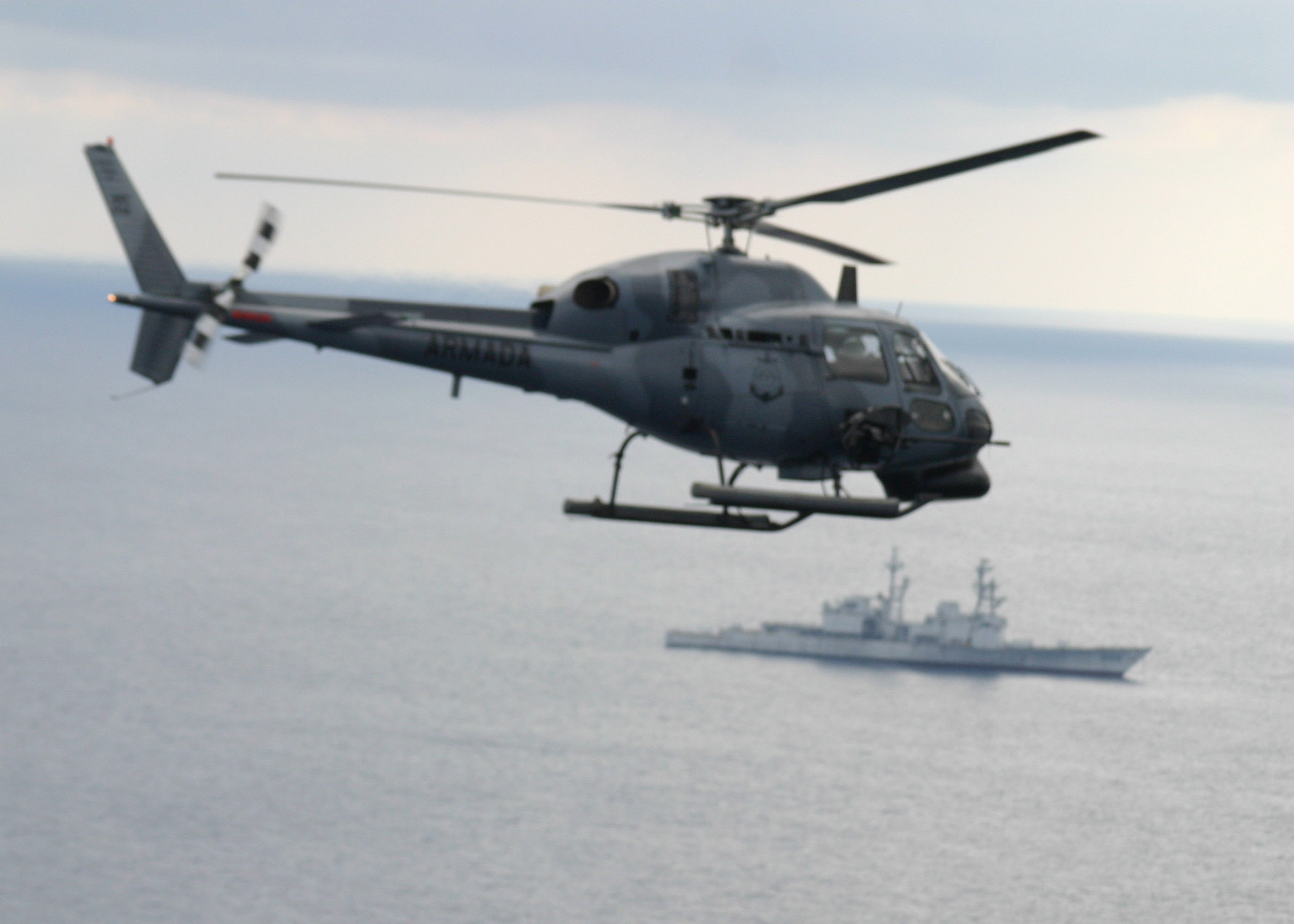
A Colombian Navy AS-555 prepares to fire at ex-Connolly during operation UNITAS Gold.
