= A. F. Theriault Shipyard =

Shipyard located in Canada

A. F. Theriault & Son Ltd.
- Industry: Shipbuilding and Repair
- Founded: 1938; 88 years ago
- Founder: Augustin Theriault
- Headquarters: Meteghan River, Canada
- Services: Vessel Construction and Repair
- Number of employees: 150–180
- Website: www.aftheriaultboatyard.com

A. F. Theriault & Son Ltd is a privately owned shipyard located in Meteghan River, Digby County, Nova Scotia, Canada. It was founded by Augustin Theriault in 1938. The shipyard has built a variety of marine vessels. Past projects include the Boston fireboat American United, built in 2011. A current series of vessels are Hammerhead Target Drones, remote controlled high-speed drones used to train naval units in five countries. In 2024 the shipyard entered a partnership with EV Maritime, where Theriault & Son would manufacture and deliver up to five electric ferries that would operate in the Bedford area.
