= Seaborne target =

Ships or floating structures shot at for practice

Seaborne targets are vessels or floating structures that are shot at for practice by naval or air forces. They may be remotely controlled and mobile, or towed behind other craft, or just set adrift in the sea.

== Target ships ==
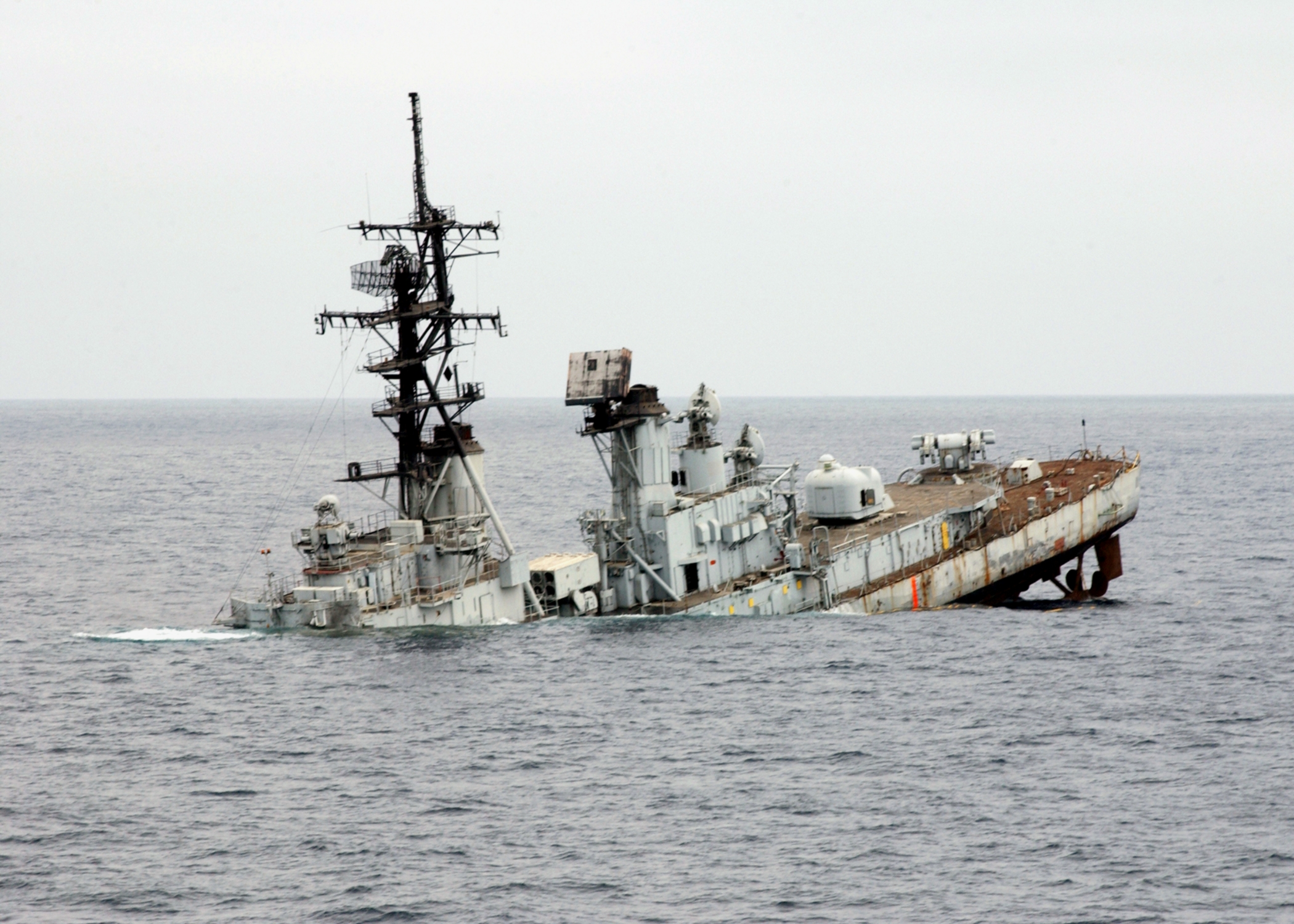
The former USS Towers (DDG-9) sinking after being used as a target ship

Target ships are vessels, typically obsolete or captured warships, used for naval gunnery practice or for weapons testing – perhaps most spectacularly in Operation Crossroads (1946), where 95 ships were sunk in a U.S. nuclear weapons test at Bikini Atoll.

== Powered targets ==
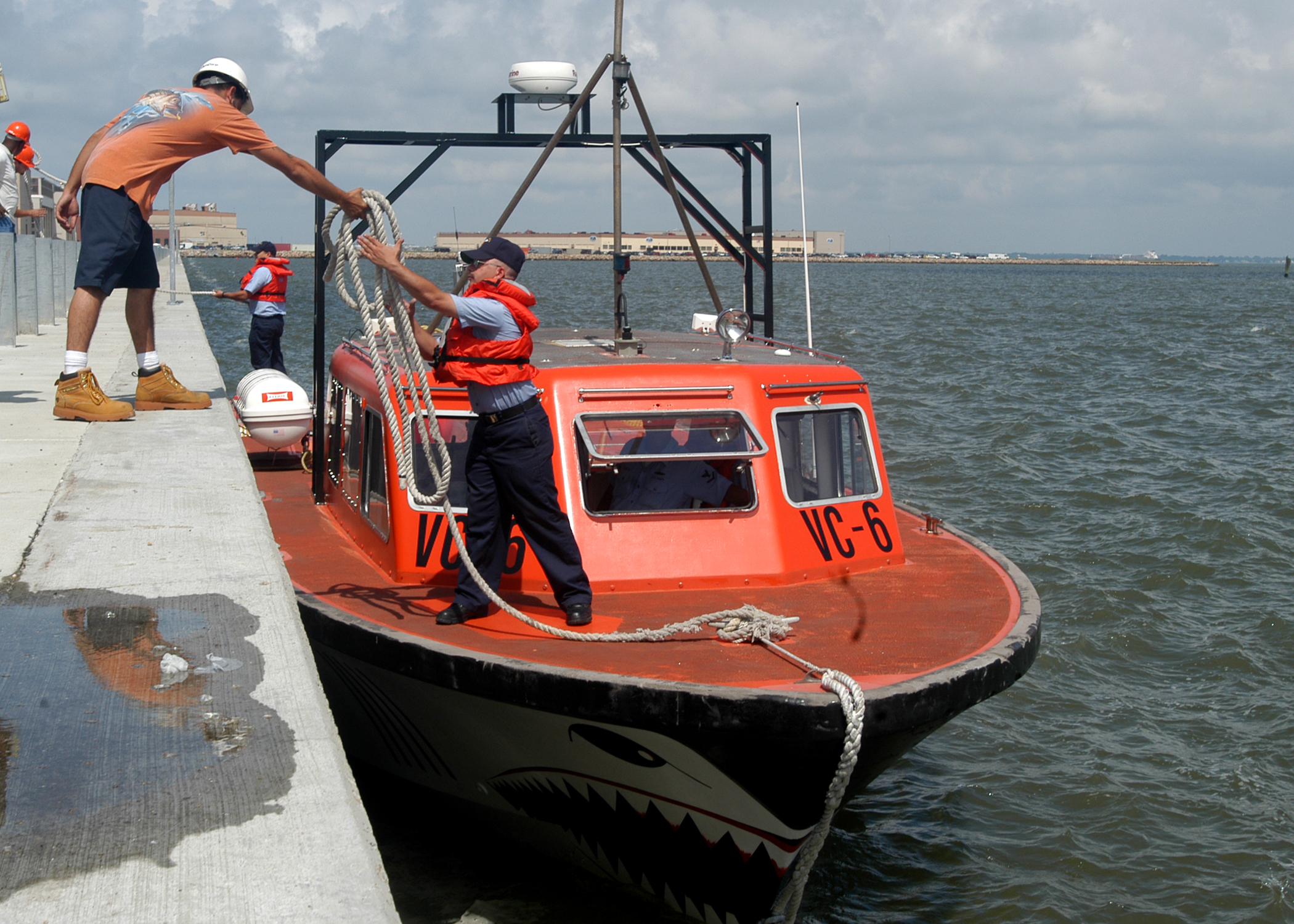
A U.S. Navy QST-35 SEPTAR

In the U.S. Navy, a Seaborne Powered Target (SEPTAR) is an unmanned surface vehicle used as the naval counterpart of a target drone. They are remote-controlled, and all but the smallest can be equipped with electromagnetic emitters to appear as a larger ship on sensors.

As of 2013, U.S. Navy SEPTARs include:

- Hammerhead usv-t: A high-speed drone capable of multiple vessel attacks.
- Mobile Ship Target (MST): A ship-sized target some 260 feet (79 m) long, with a top speed of 15 knots (28 km/h).
- QST-35: A fiberglass boat with a top speed of 30 knots (56 km/h), usable manned or unmanned, or as a mine countermeasure.
- Fast-Attack Craft Target (FACT): A smaller, more agile fiberglass boat with a top speed of 50 knots (93 km/h), intended to challenge gunners.
- High-Speed Maneuvering Surface Target (HSMST): A boat similar to a harbor patrol boat, designed for operations in shallow waters, with a top speed of 46 knots (85 km/h).
- Ship-Deployable Surface Target (SDST): A small craft similar to a water scooter, which can also be used as one, with a top speed of 49 knots (91 km/h).

Turkish Navy variants,

- Aselsan ALBATROS-T High-Speed Unmanned Surface Target Boat
- Aselsan ALBATROS-K High-Speed Unmanned Surface Target Boat

== Towed targets ==
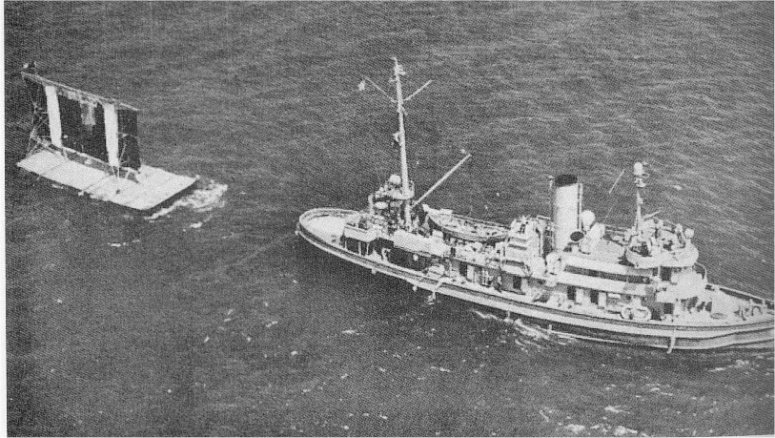
USS Kewaydin (ATO-24) towing a target sled

Targets can also be towed behind other craft, the counterparts of target tugs in aviation.

The U.S. Navy employs the Low-Cost Modular Target (LCMT), a modular barge made from pontoons, scaffolding and large colored sails as visual targets, which can be shot at with guns or a variety of missiles. It is usually towed by a HSMST.

== Free-floating targets ==
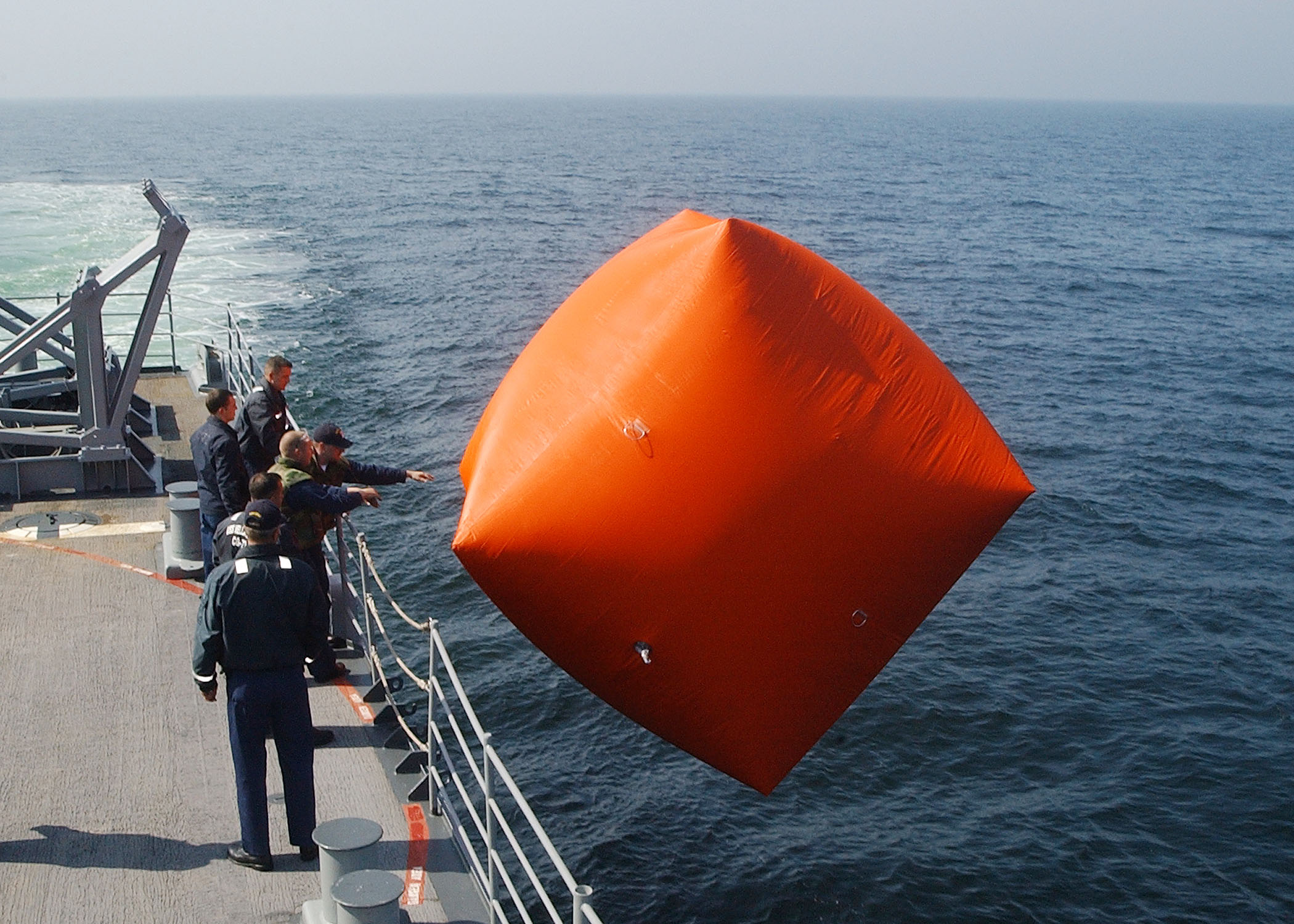
Sailors launch a "killer tomato" for use in a small arms training exercise

Navies have used all sort of equipment thrown overboard for gunnery practice, such as empty barrels.

Modern free-floating targets are large, inflatable and bright orange; hence the nickname "killer tomato".
