= Transportation in Halifax, Nova Scotia =

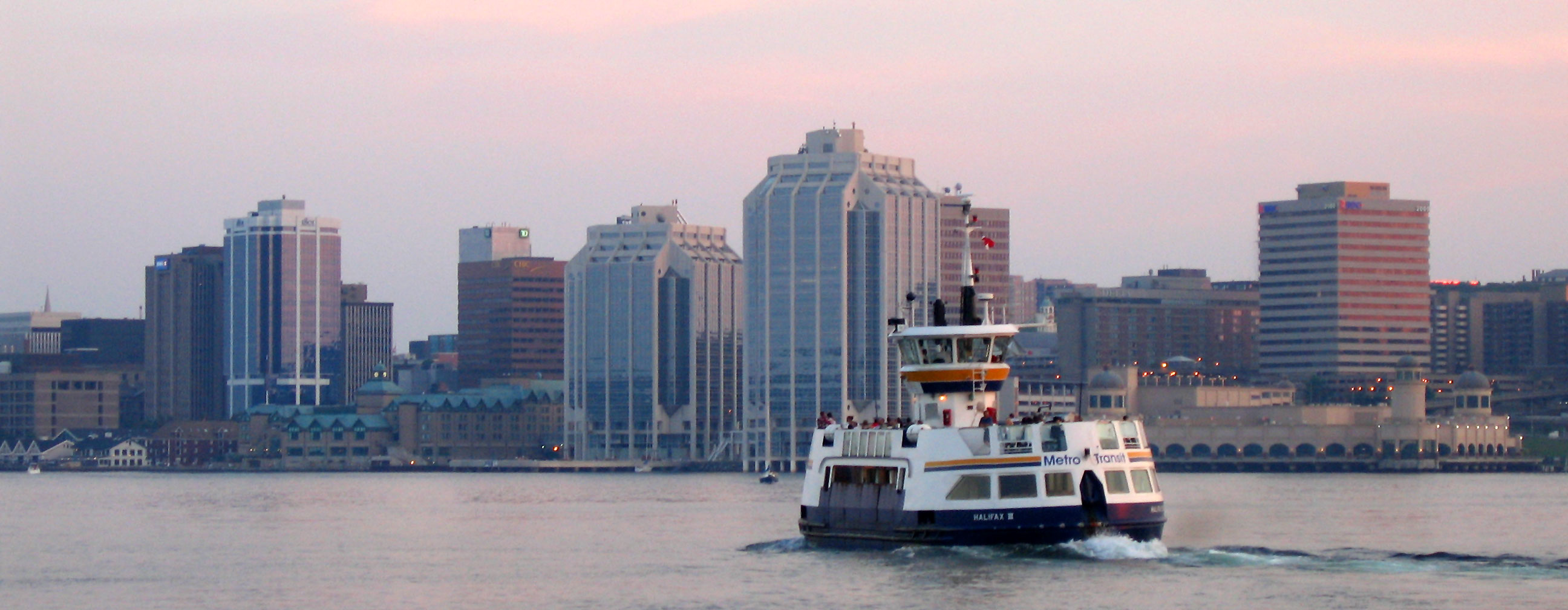
Passenger ferries have connected the communities on either side of Halifax Harbour almost since the area was founded in 1749.

Halifax Regional Municipality has a multi-modal transportation network.

== Air ==
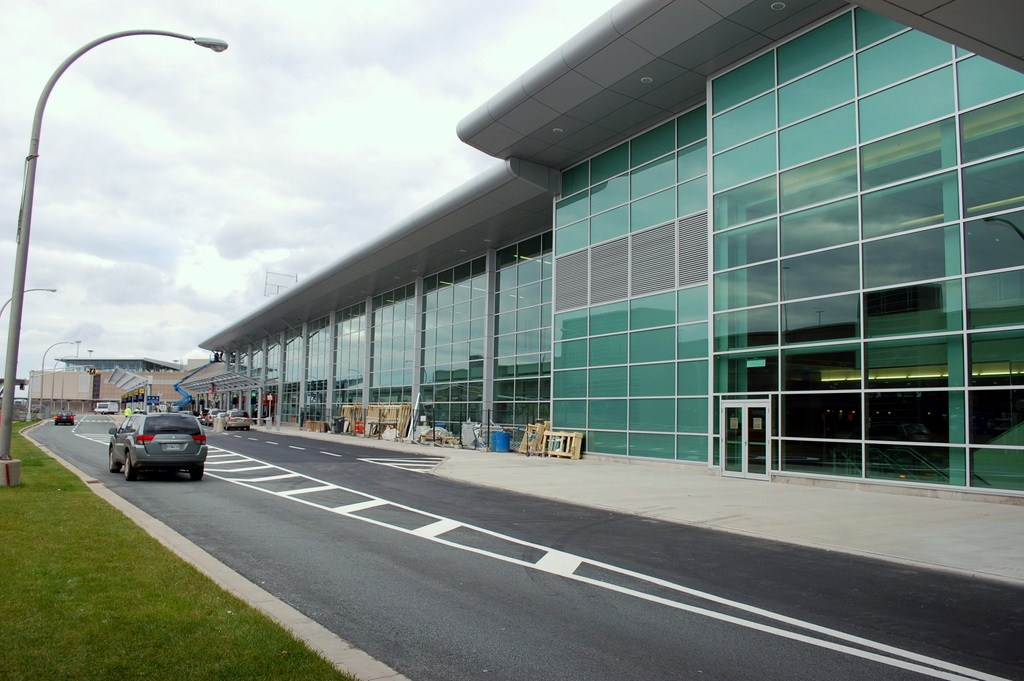
Halifax Stanfield International Airport

Halifax Stanfield International Airport, located in Goffs, is the municipality's airport. It is located approximately 40 km (25 mi) from Downtown Halifax.

== Pedestrian ==
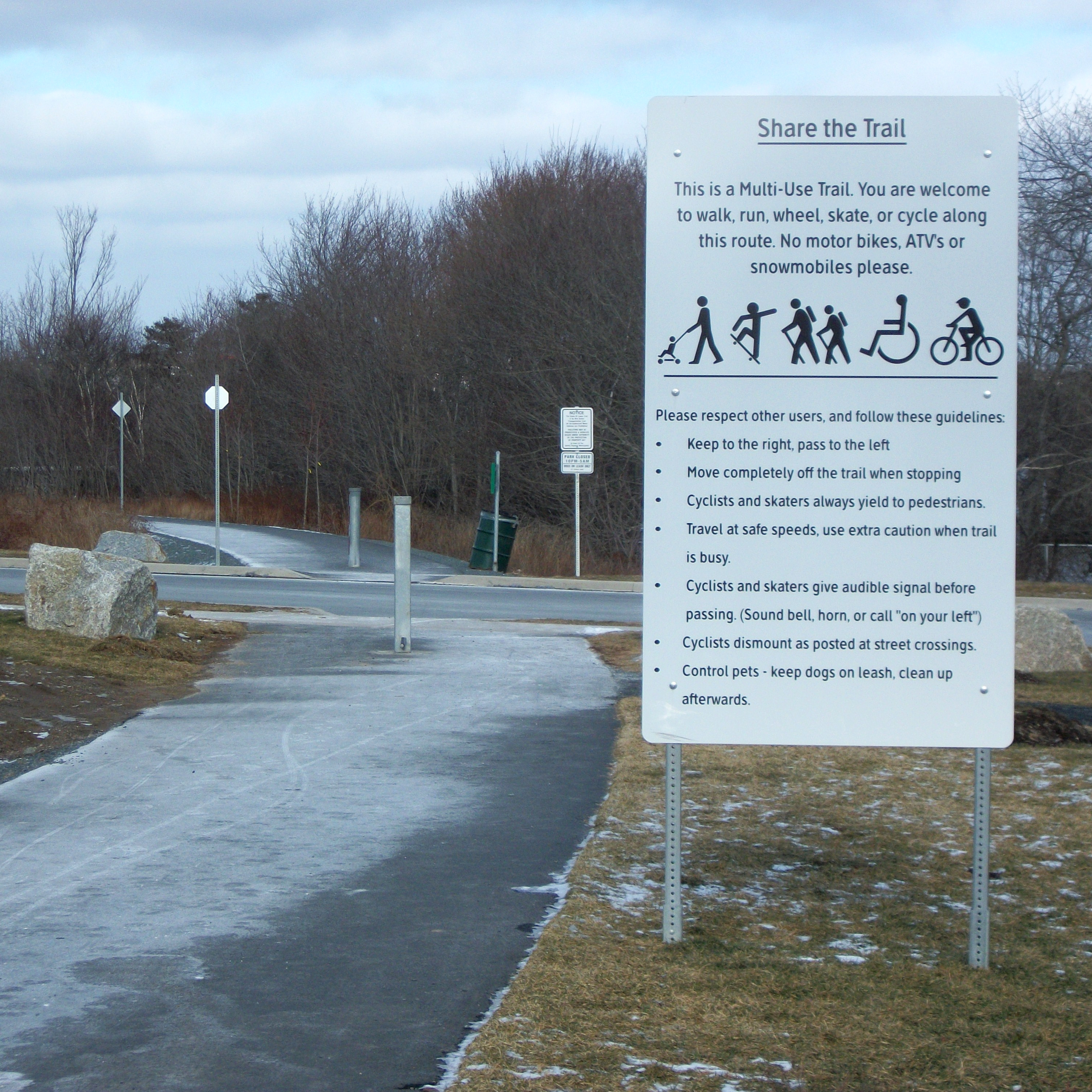
The Chain of Lakes Multipurpose Trail, was opened in 2011, adds 7.25 km (4.50 mi) to the off-road trail network in Halifax Regional Municipality.

As of 2021, Halifax Regional Municipality has an extensive network of cycling lanes, multi-use paths, and sidewalks. There are proposals for a Halifax Urban Greenway, which is envisioned to ultimately connect or construct trails around the entire perimeter of the Bedford Basin and Halifax Harbour to link Downtown Dartmouth and Downtown Halifax. Some statistics:

Type of pathway	Setting(s)	Length	Reference(s)
Bike lanes	Suburban, urban	63.7 km (39.6 mi)	
Local bikeways	Urban	1.4 km (0.87 mi)	
Protected bikeways	Urban	6.4 km (4.0 mi)	
Multi-use pathways	Rural, suburban, urban	211.5 km (131.4 mi)	
Sidewalks	Suburban, urban	993.1 km (617.1 mi)	

=== Cycling ===
As of 2006, there are 338 bicycle-racks which can hold 800 bicycles located throughout the municipality.

The first protected cycling lane in Halifax opened in November 2015 as a pilot project. The lanes are separated from automotive traffic by a painted median and plastic bollards.

==== All Ages & Abilities Bikeway Network ====
The Halifax Regional Municipality is in the process of creating an All Ages & Abilities (AAA) cycling network within the Regional Centre.

Once complete, the network will be approximately 57 km (35 mi) in length, and it will create a more-connected, safer AAA network throughout the Regional Centre.

=== Multi-use pathways ===
Within Halifax Regional Municipality, there are many multi-use pathways.

Name	Communities (or Neighbourhoods) served	Length	Reference(s)
Bedford-Sackville Greenway	Bedford, Lower Sackville	3.5 km (2.2 mi)	
Burnside Greenway	Burnside, Dartmouth		
Chain of Lakes Trail	Bayer's Lake, Lakeside, West End	7.25 km (4.50 mi)	
Mainland North Trail	Clayton Park, Fairview, Wedgewood	4.5 km (2.8 mi)	
Forest Hills Parkway multi-use Pathway	Cole Harbour		
Dartmouth Harbourfront Trail	Downtown Dartmouth, Woodside	3 km (1.9 mi)	
Dunbrack Street multi-use Pathway	Halifax		
DeWolfe Park Greenway	Bedford	1 km (0.62 mi)	
Halifax Urban Greenway	South End	1 km (0.62 mi)	
Dartmouth multi-use Trail	Dartmouth	7 km (4.3 mi)	
Mount Hope Greenway	Woodside		
North Preston Trail	North Preston		
Shubie Canal Greenway	Dartmouth, Waverley	9.25 km (5.75 mi)	

=== Walking ===
Halifax's compact downtown area is connected by an indoor pedway system featuring passages over and under streets and through shopping centres and office towers.

Built-up communities within the municipality have a better-established multi-use path--and--sidewalk connectivity, although there are still many sections that are not well connected. The less built-up the community, the likelihood of poor-connectivity increases. However, the municipality is working to improve bicycle-lane, multi-use path, sidewalk, and public transit services..

== Public ==
Public transit within Halifax Regional Municipality is provided by Halifax Transit. The main modes of public transportation are transit buses as well as ferries that operate on Halifax Harbour between Dartmouth-and-Halifax.

=== Rural ===
Halifax Transit's MetroX provides transit-routes for rural communities throughout the Halifax Regional Municipality. The communities served are Fall River, Goffs (Halifax Stanfield International Airport), Hubley (Sheldrake Lake), Porters Lake, and Upper Tantallon.

Most rural parts of Halifax Regional Municipality do not have public transit access, specifically the eastern, northern, and western areas. Rural areas are dependent upon privately operated bus-and-shuttle services.

=== Urban ===
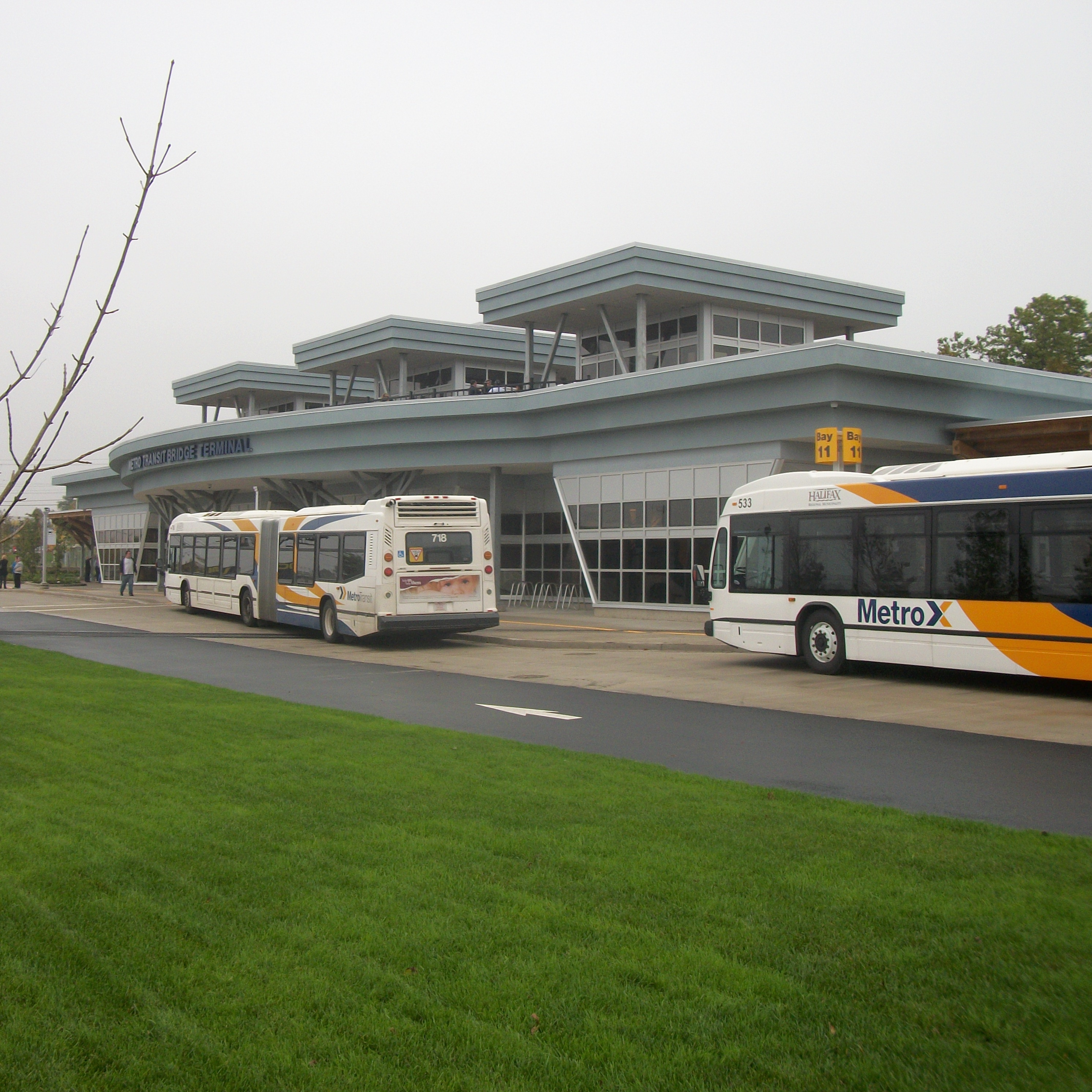
Halifax Transit's new Bridge Terminal opened in 2012 and links urban and rural transit routes.

Public transportation within the urban area of Halifax is more connected. Along with buses, Halifax Transit provides a ferry service alternative for transit users who wish to travel from Dartmouth-to-Halifax, and vice versa.

Ferry-route name	Start	End	Reference(s)
Alderney	Downtown Halifax	Downtown Dartmouth (Alderney Landing)	
Woodside	Downtown Halifax	Woodside	

=== Proposed ===
==== Rapid ferry service ====
There have been proposed high-speed ferry routes to Larry Uteck, Mill Cove, and Shannon Park. The ferries would travel at speeds between 35–45 km/h (22–28 mph), and would hold 150 passengers on a single-decked catamaran. The ferries would run every 15 minutes during peak hours, and every 60 minutes during non-peak hours.

==== Commuter rail service ====
Former mayor, Peter Kelly, and several regional councillors have favoured instituting a commuter rail or a light rail network. The network would utilize abandoned-and-current railway lines to give more options to Haligonians.

In August 2015, the municipality hired CPCS Transcom to prepare a study for the feasibility of commuter-rail in Halifax Regional Municipality. The study concluded that as of 2015, commuter-rail within Halifax Regional Municipality was not economically viable at that moment, but it was feasible.

== Rail ==
Three important branch rail lines operated by CN were abandoned in the Halifax Regional Municipality in recent decades. One line ran along the Eastern Shore, one line went towards the North Shore, and another line went towards the Annapolis Valley. The rail corridors of all routes are still intact and used as recreational pathways, preserved by the provincial and municipal governments for possible reinstatement of rail service.

=== Commuter ===
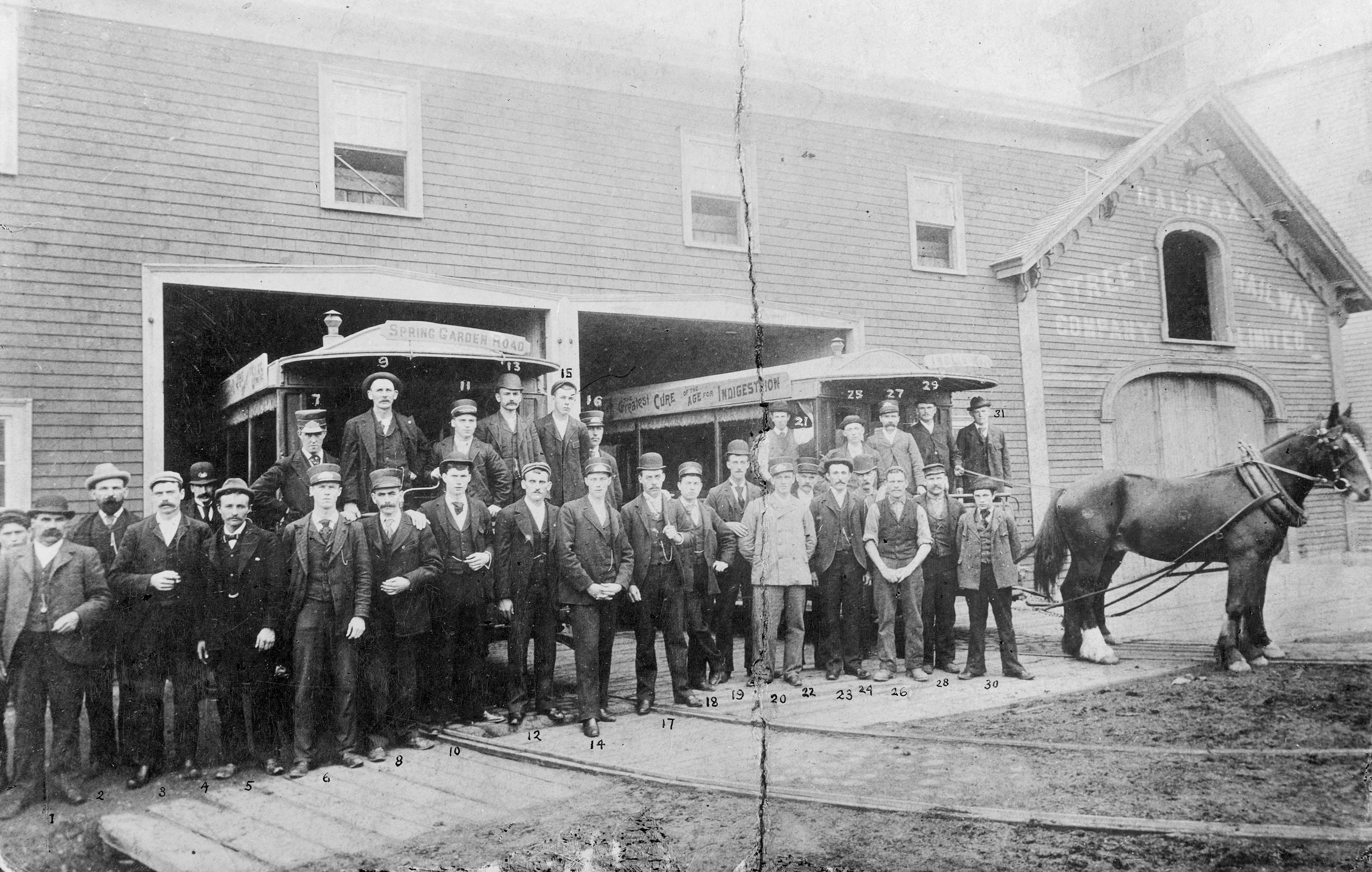
Halifax Street Railway Co., ca. 1894

Historically, the Halifax Peninsula had an extensive streetcar transit system dating to the late 1800s. Operated by various private companies including the Halifax Street Railway Co., the Nova Scotia Power Co. (not the same company as the present electric utility), the Halifax Electric Tramway Co., the Nova Scotia Tramways and Power Co., and the Nova Scotia Light and Power Company, Limited, the streetcar system was abandoned by the Nova Scotia Light and Power Company on 26th March 1949. Streetcars were replaced by an electric trolley coach system, however, the Halifax Transit Corporation replaced the last electric trolley coaches with conventional diesel buses on 1st January 1970.

=== Intercity ===
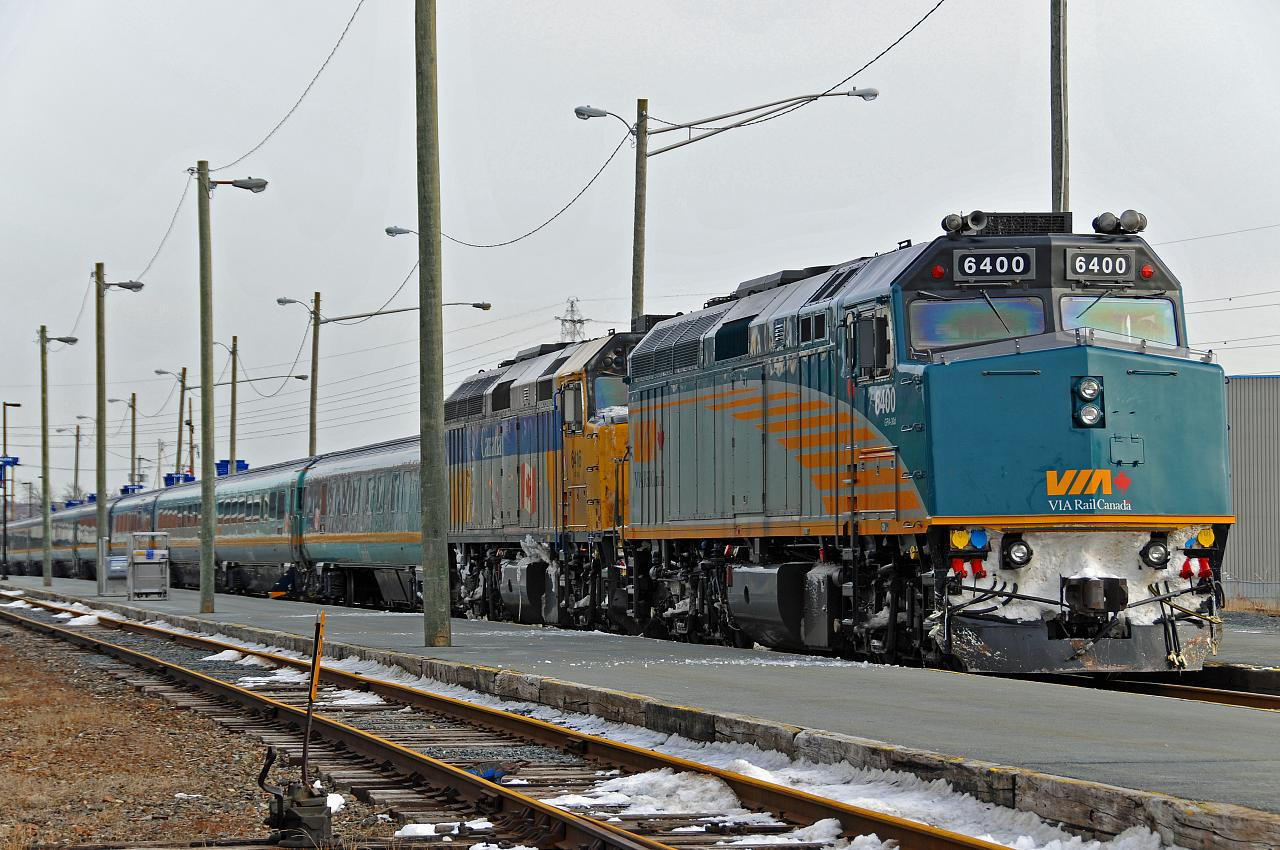
Ocean Limited at Halifax

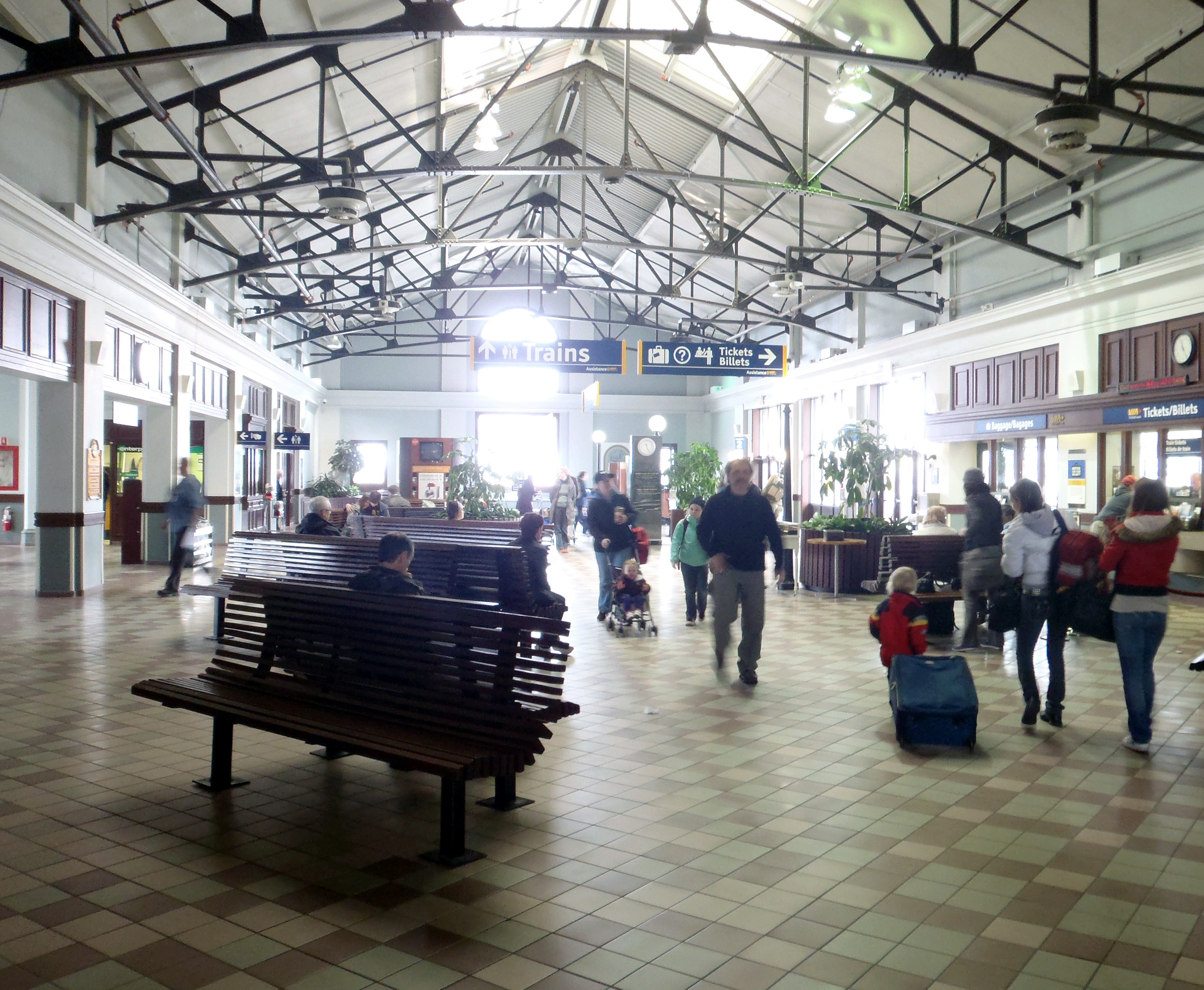
VIA rail station interior, 2012

The Ocean is the sole inter-city rail service available, connecting Halifax with Montreal. The train runs three days per week, and takes approximately 22 hours to travel 1,346 km (836 mi).

=== Freight ===
Halifax Regional Municipality is the eastern terminus of the Canadian National Railway (CN). CN provides direct freight service to Chicago, Montreal, and Toronto from either of the Halifax Port Authority's two container terminals, or the port's general cargo and specialized cargo piers. Canadian National Railway operates rail lines from Dartmouth, and Halifax.

== Road ==
=== Rural ===
Within the rural areas of the municipality, many of the roads are two-laned 100-series highways, 200-series highways, 300-series highways, and trunk highways. The longest is Trunk 7 which runs from Bedford to Antigonish.

=== Urban ===
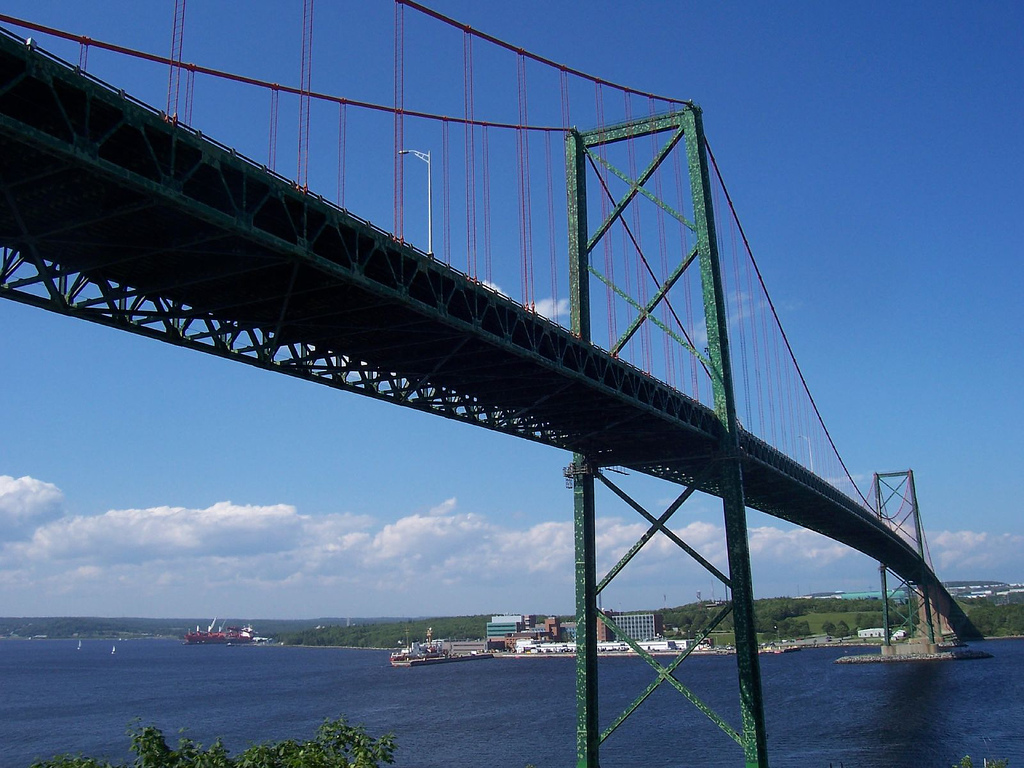
The A. Murray MacKay Bridge is one of two suspension bridges across Halifax Harbour. Together, they carry 100,000 vehicles per day.

The communities of Dartmouth-and-Halifax, Nova Scotia are linked by two suspension bridges. The Angus L. Macdonald Bridge, since 1955, and the A. Murray MacKay Bridge since 1970. On an average workday, both bridges carry over 100,000 vehicles.

==== Vehicular traffic congestion ====
Traffic congestion is increasing within Halifax as its population increases. The population of workers living in suburban areas, peri-urban areas, exurban areas, and within the urban area of Halifax itself, has recently increased at a much higher rate. Along with the municipality's natural geography-and-its road design, bottleneck points have emerged that cause delays.

The concept of congestion tolling has been floated in the municipality from time to time. In 2011, a scholarly report studied the feasibility of implementing such a scheme.

== Water ==
Halifax, like many municipalities on water, has several options for transport on the waterways within its boundaries. Some options are purely functional (Halifax-Dartmouth ferry service), and some options are designed for leisure/recreation (Halifax Harbour Hopper).

== See also ==
- Plug-in electric vehicles in Nova Scotia § Halifax
