= Metro Express =

Metro Express may refer to:

- Metro Express (Chinese newspaper), a former newspaper published in Tianjin, China
- MetroExpress (Halifax), a bus service in Halifax, Canada
- Metro Express (Los Angeles County), an express bus service in Los Angeles, United States
- Metro Express (Mauritius), a light rail transport service in Mauritius
- Metro Express (Miami-Dade County), a bus rapid transit service in Miami-Dade County, United States
- Metro Express II, a former subsidiary of defunct airline holding company Metro Airlines
- Metro ExpressLanes, a transport project taking place in Los Angeles, United States
