= Lakeside, Nova Scotia =

Lakeside
- Community
- Location within Nova Scotia
- Coordinates: 44°38′13.2″N 63°42′3.7″W
- Country: Canada
- Province: Nova Scotia
- Municipality: Halifax
- Community: Lakeside
- Municipal Council: District 12 (Timberlea-Beechville-Clayton Park-Wedgewood)

Area
  - Total: 1.05 km^{2} (0.41 sq mi)

Lakeside is a community within the urban area of the Municipality of Halifax in Nova Scotia.

== Geography ==
Lakeside in Nova Scotia

The Halifax Regional Municipality Urban Forest Master Plan records that Lakeside has a land area of 105 hectares (1.05 km^{2}).

== Demographics ==
The only demographic information that is available for the area is for District 12 (Timberlea-Beechville-Clayton Park-Wedgewood). There are 25,505 people living within the District—however—there is no demographic information for the community of Lakeside.

== Transportation ==
Lakeside is serviced by Halifax Transit routes Route 21 (Timberlea), and Route 123 (Timberlea Express).

Route 21 (Timberlea) arrives at the Lacewood Terminal in Clayton Park. If the transit-user needs to travel to anywhere within the urban area of Halifax, they can use Route 21 (Timberlea) to arrive at the Lacewood Terminal, and travel elsewhere.

Route 123 (Timberlea Express) arrives at the Scotia Square Terminal in Downtown Halifax. This stop is very similar to the Lacewood Terminal, but much busier. Scotia Square Terminal is serviced by many more transit routes.

Halifax Transit Routes

- Route 21 (Timberlea)
- Route 123 (Timberlea Express)
