= Halifax Transit =

Canadian public transport service

Coordinates: 44°41′34″N 63°35′4.4″W

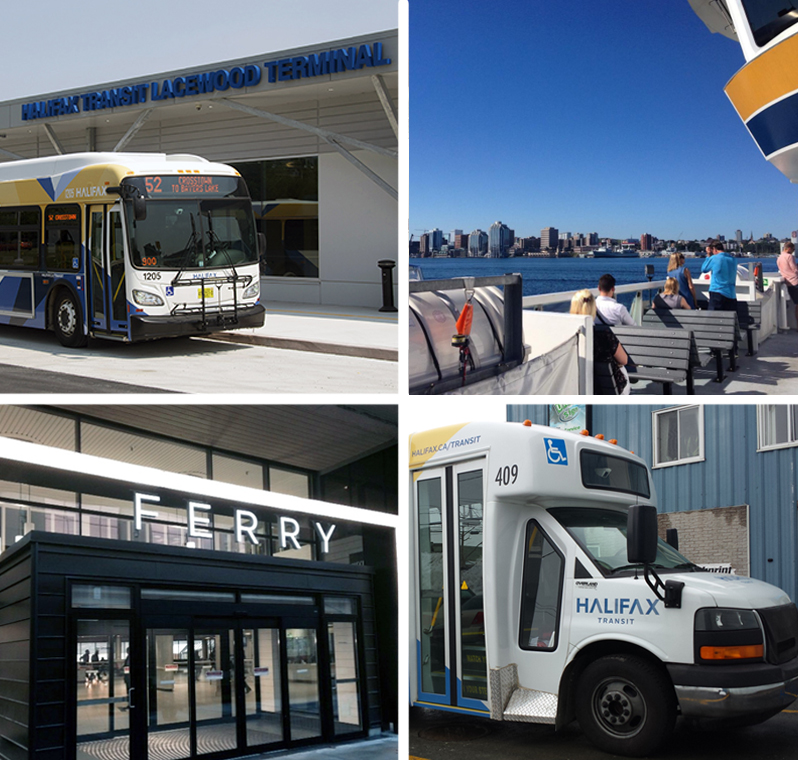
- Clockwise from top left: Halifax Transit bus, view of Halifax from the deck of the Stannix, Access-a-Bus vehicle, entrance to Dartmouth Alderney terminal

Overview
- Area served: Urban Transit Service Area
- Locale: Halifax, Nova Scotia
- Transit type: Bus, ferry
- Number of lines: 69 bus routes 2 ferry routes
- Daily ridership: 103,165 (average weekday, 2024/25)
- Annual ridership: 32.3 million (2024/25)
- Key people: Robin Gerus, Executive Director
- Headquarters: 200 Ilsley Avenue, Dartmouth, Nova Scotia
- Website: http://halifax.ca/transit

Operation
- Began operation: 1981 (as Metro Transit)
- Operator: Halifax Regional Municipality
- Number of vehicles: 369 buses 5 ferries 47 paratransit buses

Halifax Transit is a Canadian public transport service operating buses and ferries in Halifax, Nova Scotia. Founded as Metro Transit in March 1981, the agency runs two ferry routes, 63 conventional bus routes (including corridor, local, and express services), three regional express routes (called MetroX), and three rural routes. Halifax Transit also operates Access-a-Bus, a door-to-door paratransit service for senior and disabled citizens.

Total ridership in the 2024/25 fiscal year was about 32.3 million, with the system carrying an average of 103,165 on weekdays. According to the 2016 census, Halifax had the seventh-highest proportion of workers taking transit to work among Canadian cities.

== History ==
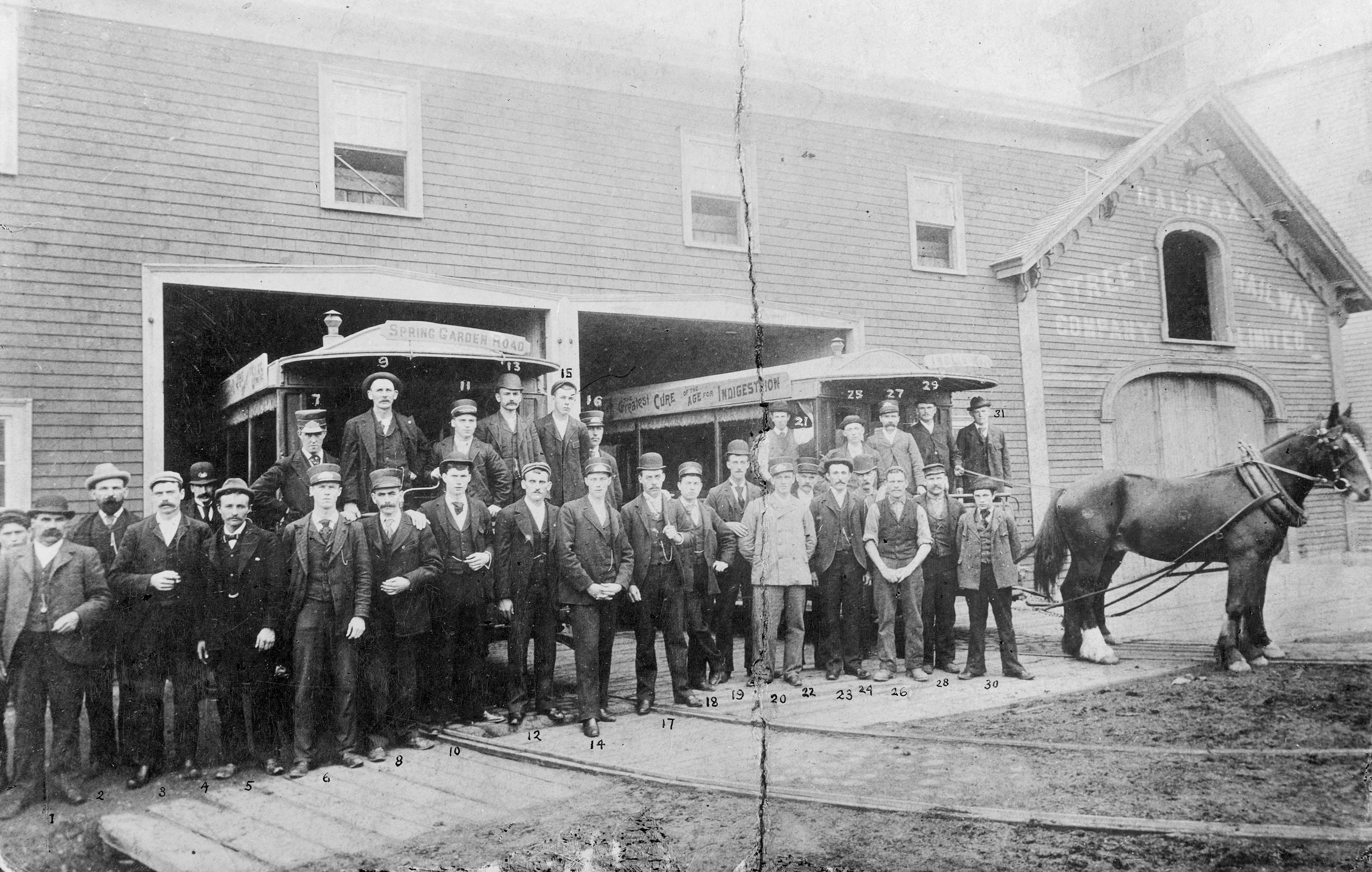
Two open (summer) horse cars of the Halifax Street Railway Co, 1894

=== Preceding services ===
Halifax was among the first Canadian cities to be served by an integrated public transportation system, pre-dated only by Toronto, Montreal and Quebec City.

The city's first transit service came with the establishment of the Dartmouth ferry service, first chartered in 1752. In 1816, the sail-powered ferry was replaced by a horse-powered boat, and in 1830 by a steam ferry. While private horse-drawn omnibus services are known to have begun in the city at least as early as 1854, the roots of Halifax Transit date back to June 11, 1866.

The Halifax City Railroad Company (HCR) began operations with five horse-drawn trams on rails that stretched from the corner of Barrington Street and Inglis Street in the south end to the city’s first railway station, near the corner of Duffus Street and Campbell Road (now Barrington Street), in the north end.

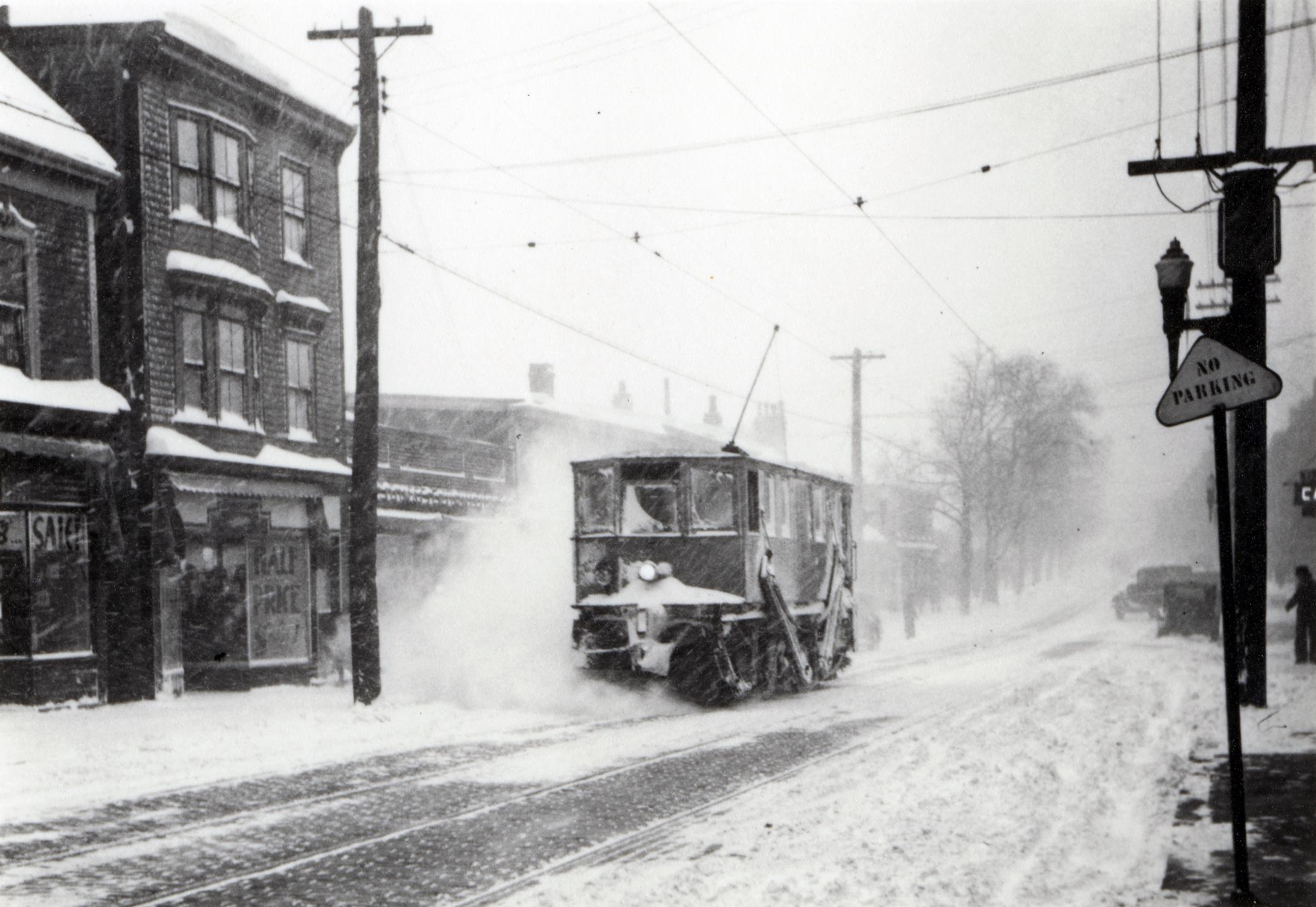
Tram with plow attachment, 1930s

Notwithstanding a ten-year hiatus, horse-drawn street railway services continued in Halifax until April 1896 when the system, now operated by the Halifax Electric Tramway Company, completed the conversion to electric-powered operation. The street railway served Halifax until March 1949, when the war-worn trams were replaced by "trackless" electric trolley coaches.

The bright yellow trolleys, operated by utility company Nova Scotia Light and Power, plied city streets exclusively until 1963, when they were supplemented by diesel buses for the first time. The system became all-diesel on January 1, 1970, the same day the City of Halifax took over operation under the name Halifax Transit. Some of Halifax's T-44 trolleybuses were sold to the Toronto Transit Commission for parts for their Western Flyer E-700A.

Dartmouth Transit provided transit service in Dartmouth, a separate city at that time.

=== Unification ===
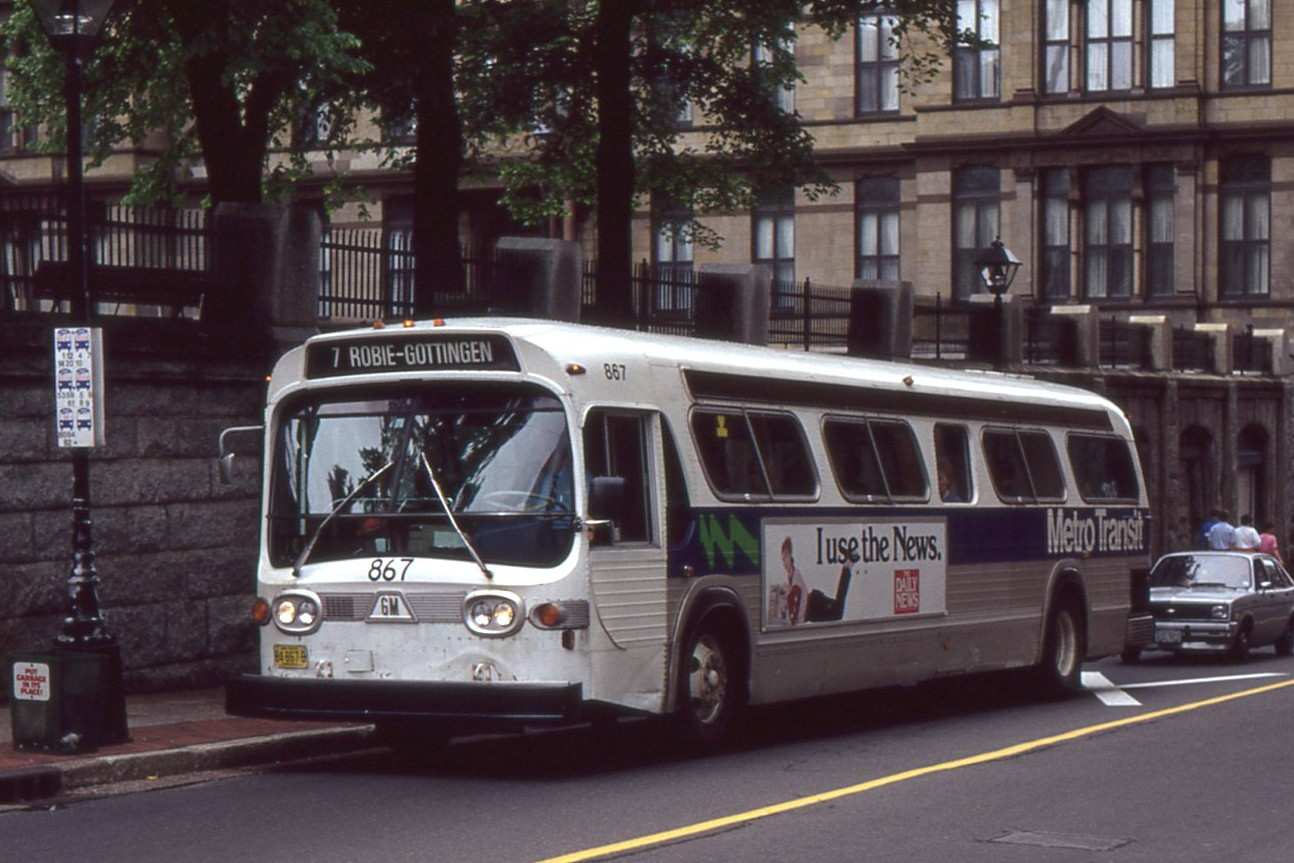
Metro Transit bus on Barrington Street, 1990

Metro Transit, a single transit agency serving all of the greater Halifax-Dartmouth metropolitan area, began operations in March 1981. The system was created by the Metropolitan Authority, an agency representing the former cities of Halifax and Dartmouth as well as suburban Halifax County, to consolidate the transit operations of the Halifax Transit Corporation and Dartmouth Transit.

Metro Transit expanded in 1994 with the absorption of the Dartmouth ferry services formerly operated by the city of Dartmouth. Ownership of the transit service was transferred to the newly created Halifax Regional Municipality when Halifax, Dartmouth, Bedford, and Halifax County were amalgamated in 1996. Since then, the service has been operated directly by the municipal government, and since October 2010 the agency has reported through the Transportation Standing Committee of Halifax Regional Council. The municipality announced on July 15, 2014 that it was changing the service's name to Halifax Transit to reflect the city's new brand.

=== MetroLink ===
The MetroLink service, a bus rapid transit (BRT) express bus service, was developed in 2003 between the Halifax Regional Municipality, the Province of Nova Scotia and Transport Canada's Urban Transportation Showcase Program, a five-year program designed to demonstrate and promote urban transportation strategies in reducing greenhouse gas emissions. The program selected cities across the country to showcase a number of different initiatives in reducing greenhouse gases. Halifax Regional Municipality's $13.3-million proposal for a BRT system was chosen, and $4.1 million was given by the Government of Canada toward this project. The remainder was funded by the Halifax Regional Municipality ($8.06 million), the Nova Scotia Department of Transportation and Public Works ($785,000) and the Nova Scotia Department of Energy ($80,000). Twenty low floor buses were purchased from New Flyer Industries for the MetroLink service. These buses featured air conditioning, high-back reclining seats with footrests, carpeted walls, and ceilings to reduce road noise and vibration, a special livery and logo, and no advertisements both on the inside and outside. One of these buses, #600, was on public display on April 12, 2005, outside of City Hall. The bus was available for media and members of the general public to tour, and increase awareness of the new service.

The service was launched in phases, with the first phase on August 21, 2005. The first phase saw the construction of a new bus terminal in Cole Harbour called Portland Hills Terminal, with a 230-space parking lot, including some spaces reserved for carpool parking. Two routes were created at this time, the 159 Portland Hills Link and 165 Woodside Link.

The second phase was launched on February 20, 2006. This phase saw the construction of a new bus terminal in Lower Sackville called the Sackville Terminal on Walker Ave, with a 315-space parking lot. One new route was created, the 185 Sackville Link.

==== Vehicles ====
In 2005, Halifax Regional Municipality purchased twenty new buses from New Flyer Industries of Winnipeg, Manitoba. It was assumed at the time that HRM would purchase New Flyer's D40i Invero model, which New Flyer was marketing towards BRT services, however HRM resisted and ordered 20 model D40LF instead, and were given fleet numbers 600 - 619. The D40LF was the current bus of choice at the time for Halifax Transit's regular fleet, so they opted to keep the status quo.

These twenty buses featured a new livery on the outside, air conditioning on the inside (a first for Halifax Transit), bike racks, carpeting on the walls and ceiling to reduce road noise and vibrations, and larger plush high-back reclining chairs with arm and leg rests and custom designed fabric design. Also differentiating these buses from the rest of the Halifax Transit fleet are onboard transmitters for the 3M Opticom system. Opticom is the system in place in HRM used by fire services and MetroLink, to allow emergency and transit vehicles to hold green lights and prevent them from turning red until the vehicle has passed through the intersection. The system was also used to trigger transit priority signals at certain intersections, allowing MetroLink buses to move into the intersection using special bus-only lanes before the rest of the vehicles can proceed. This allowed MetroLink buses at a red light to "jump" ahead of waiting cars.

==== Fares ====
Effective September 1, 2024, the MetroLink service had its own fare structure, separate from the rest of the Halifax Transit system. Cash fares cost an extra fifty cents over and above the regular fares. MetroLink had its own monthly bus pass, the MetroLink Pass, which could have been used on any Halifax Transit service. Passengers would have been able to use regular transit tickets or monthly bus passes (MetroPass), but they must deposit an additional fifty cents into the farebox.

Category	Cash Fare	MetroLink Pass	With Transit Ticket, MetroPass, UPass or Transfer
Adult	$3.00	$90.00	+50 cents
Senior/Youth	$2.25	$66.00	+50 cents
Student	$3.00	n/a	+50 cents

==== Bus stops ====
Part of Halifax Regional Municipality's plans for distinguishing the MetroLink service from the rest of the Halifax Transit system involved creating special bus stop signs, bus shelters and info posts at MetroLink bus stops. The new bus stop signs featured the same colours and design as the livery on the buses, the new shelters featured the gold and blue MetroLink "swirl" along the back wall, and the new info posts, which displayed maps and schedule information for the three former MetroLink routes, they were also done in the same gold and blue swirl, with the stop name vertically oriented along the side.

==== Traffic changes ====
A number of changes were made to streets and intersections along the routes to help the MetroLink buses get ahead of the rest of traffic. The following changes were introduced:

- Bus-only lanes and traffic priority signals along Portland Street in Dartmouth for the route 159 and 165. The lanes and signals are located at the intersection of Portland Street and Woodlawn Road. The bus-only lanes allowed the MetroLink buses to bypass traffic waiting at a red light. Just before the light turns green, a special transit priority signal (a white vertical bar above the red stop light) comes on, allowing the bus to enter the intersection ahead of waiting vehicles.
- Bus-only lanes and traffic priority signals along Windmill Road in the Burnside Industrial Park for the route 185. The lanes and signals are located at the intersections of Windmill Road, Wright Ave and Akerley Blvd. They work in the same manner as described above.

==== Former planned development ====
Phase three of the MetroLink service was expected to take place within the next five years of the first three lines. This phase would have seen new terminals and MetroLink routes in other busy corridors such as Clayton Park and Spryfield.

Plans existed to introduce a new route to service the Cobequid Terminal, also in Lower Sackville shortly after the 185 Sackville Link came into service. Destination signs on board the buses were even programmed with a route 184 Cobequid, and early maps of the MetroLink service showed a route 184 between Cobequid Terminal and downtown Halifax, however this plan seems to have been abandoned.

==== Impacts ====
- The route 185 Sackville Line improved transit connections to downtown Halifax from Lower Sackville, since standard bus service on routes 87 & 1 takes 43 minutes in optimal conditions, and bus service on the route 80 (which travels via Bedford) takes 1 hour 10 minutes.
- Both routes 159 Portland Hills Link and 185 Sackville Link saw unprecedented ridership in the first few months of service. Initial rush hour schedules saw both routes running on 15-minute frequencies, however within months this was changed to 10-minutes. Also, both Portland Hills Terminal and the Sackville Terminal underwent expansions to their parking lots, bringing the combined capacity of both lots to 545 cars. Still, both parking lots were frequently full, with people parking on the driveways to the lots.

=== Fuel leak ===
In 2014, a massive fuel leak spilling close to 200,000 litres of fuel at Halifax Transit's Burnside bus depot went undetected for almost four months. In addition to the cost of lost fuel, cleanup from local environmental damage and groundwater contamination as far as 1 km away cost Halifax Regional Municipality approximately $2.5 million. Before the discovery of the leak, Halifax Transit initially claimed that the excess fuel consumption was caused by higher usage during winter.

The municipal auditor general investigated the incident and recommended that Halifax Transit improve monitoring of fuel usage and inventory and improve training of employees involved in fuel handling.

=== System redesign ===
In January 2014, Halifax Regional Council approved a study to look at a major re-design of the city's transit system. The "Moving Forward Together Plan" (MFTP) was adopted in-principle by the council in April 2016. Proposed amendments to the plan were defeated in November 2016, with the exception of a change to the route of the Porters Lake MetroX and a short reprieve to attempt to increase ridership to save the #15 bus to York Redoubt.

The Moving Forward Together Plan is Halifax Transit's five-year improvement plan that outlines planned changes to the transit network from late 2016 to 2020. The plan aims to increase the proportion of resources dedicated to high-ridership routes, simplify the system and make it more understandable, improve service quality and reliability, and give priority to transit in the transportation network. The plan created a new classification system for bus routes, designating them as corridor, local, express, regional express, or rural routes. Corridor routes form the backbone of the revamped bus system, providing frequent service connecting transit terminals.

Some critics called the plan inadequate, outlining various criticisms including inefficient and redundant route design, missing data and analysis, a long implementation period causing nuisance to riders, and a lack of network connectivity. In addition, critics characterised the "Moving Forward Together Plan" as disregarding the key principles that Halifax Transit identified through years of public engagement and consultation. Business groups have also noted both the current lack of service, and lack of proposed future service, along key corridors of the region.

The changes proposed under the Moving Forward Together Plan were implemented in stages each year, with the first round of changes taking place during the 2017/18 fiscal year. The final changes were delayed due to the COVID-19 pandemic and chronic staffing shortages, but were ultimately completed during the 2024/25 fiscal year.

== Operations ==
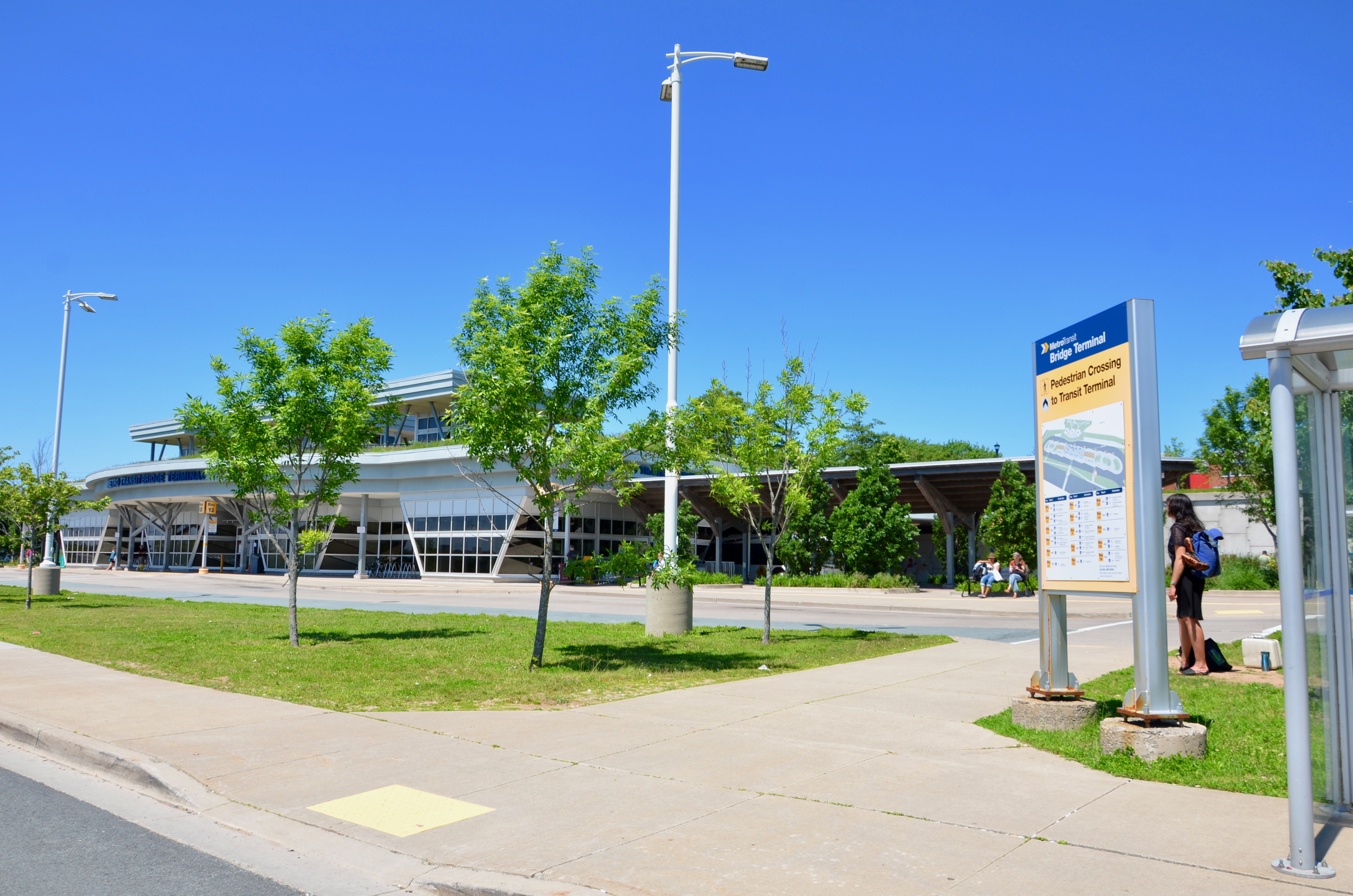
Bridge Terminal, which opened in 2012

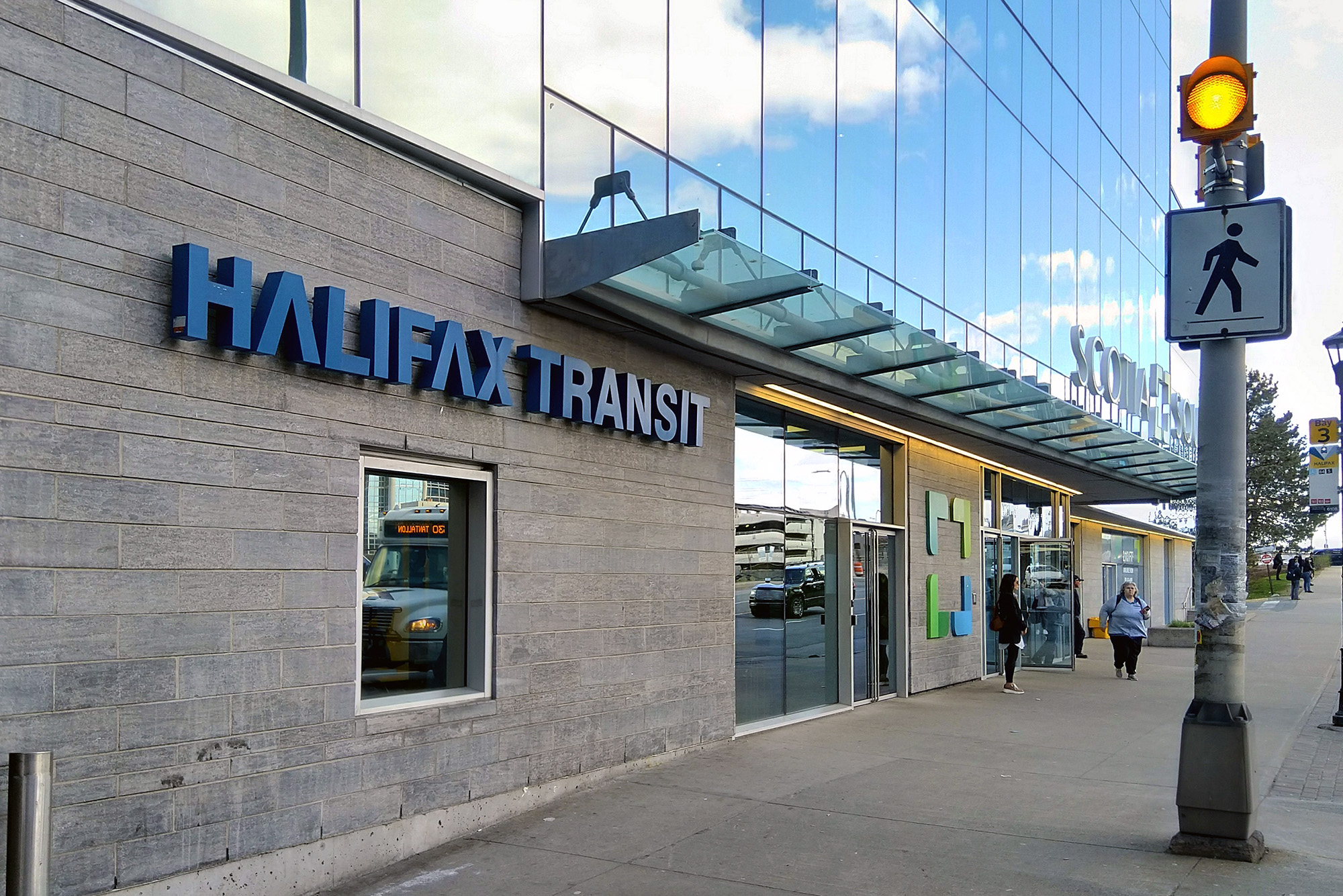
Scotia Square Terminal in downtown Halifax

=== Bus services ===
There are 369 conventional buses in the fleet, all of which are low floor and wheelchair accessible.

Halifax Transit operates 63 conventional bus routes within the Urban Transit Service Boundary, broadly similar to the metropolitan region of Halifax Regional Municipality (Halifax, Dartmouth, Bedford and Sackville), including the areas of Eastern Passage, North Preston/Cherry Brook and Herring Cove. Routes are numbered according to the region or type of service provided. The agency also operates three regional express routes and three rural routes.

The bus fleet is stored and maintained at two depots, namely the Burnside Transit Centre and the Ragged Lake Transit Centre.

==== Corridor routes ====
Corridor routes are higher-ridership routes that provide frequent service for most of the day. They serve major destinations and transit terminals. Following the round of service adjustments implemented in November 2021, there are ten corridor routes, numbered 1-10.

Corridor routes, considered the backbone of the bus system, operate at headways of 5–15 minutes during peak hours.

==== Local routes ====
Local routes provide connect neighbourhoods to corridor routes (at transit terminals). Local routes operate all day, except for four routes that operate at peak hours only: 26, 50, 57, and 93 (as well as parts of route 51).

==== Express routes ====
Express routes provide limited-stop services to major destinations (e.g. downtown Halifax) at peak hours. Express bus stops are designated with a red route decal.

Express routes are sometimes paired with a local route, providing service along the local route before continuing along the express portion of the journey. For example, route 182 First Lake Express is an extended version of route 82 First Lake.

This service type consolidated the former MetroLink and "Urban Express" services.

==== Regional Express routes ====
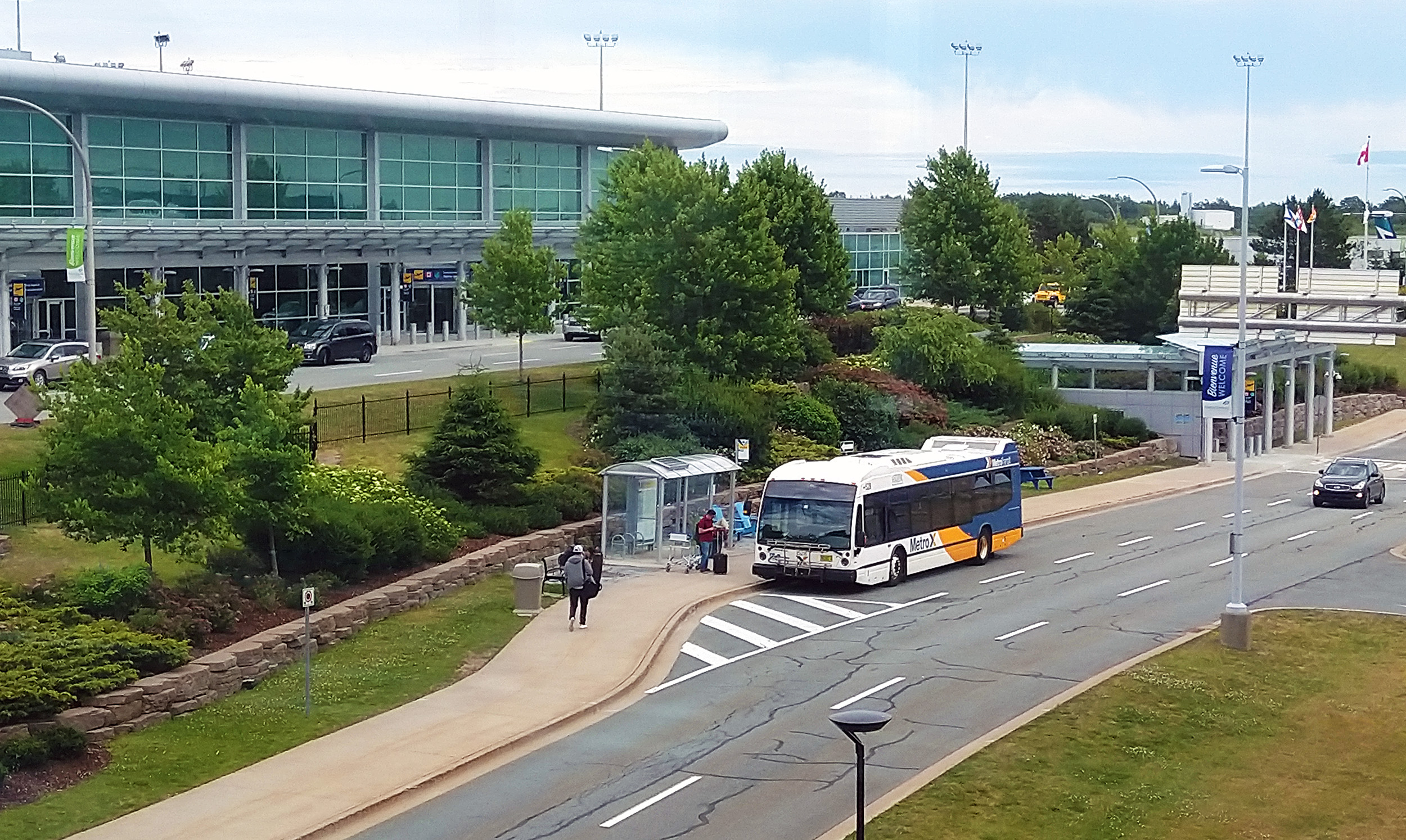
A regional express bus (route 320) serving Halifax Stanfield International Airport

Regional Express routes connect outlying areas to the regional centre. A higher fare is charged for these routes.

Also branded as MetroX, there are three Regional Express routes. These started operating in August 2009 and connect Tantallon, the Airport, and Porters Lake, respectively, to Scotia Square in downtown Halifax. The routes are handicap accessible and have facilities for bicycle carriage.

Among the three Regional Express routes, only route 320 (serving the airport) provides service on the weekend.

==== Rural routes ====
Rural routes provide service to areas outside the Urban Transit Service Boundary which had transit service before the boundary was adopted. There are three such routes, which connect rural areas to the nearest bus terminal.

=== Ferry services ===
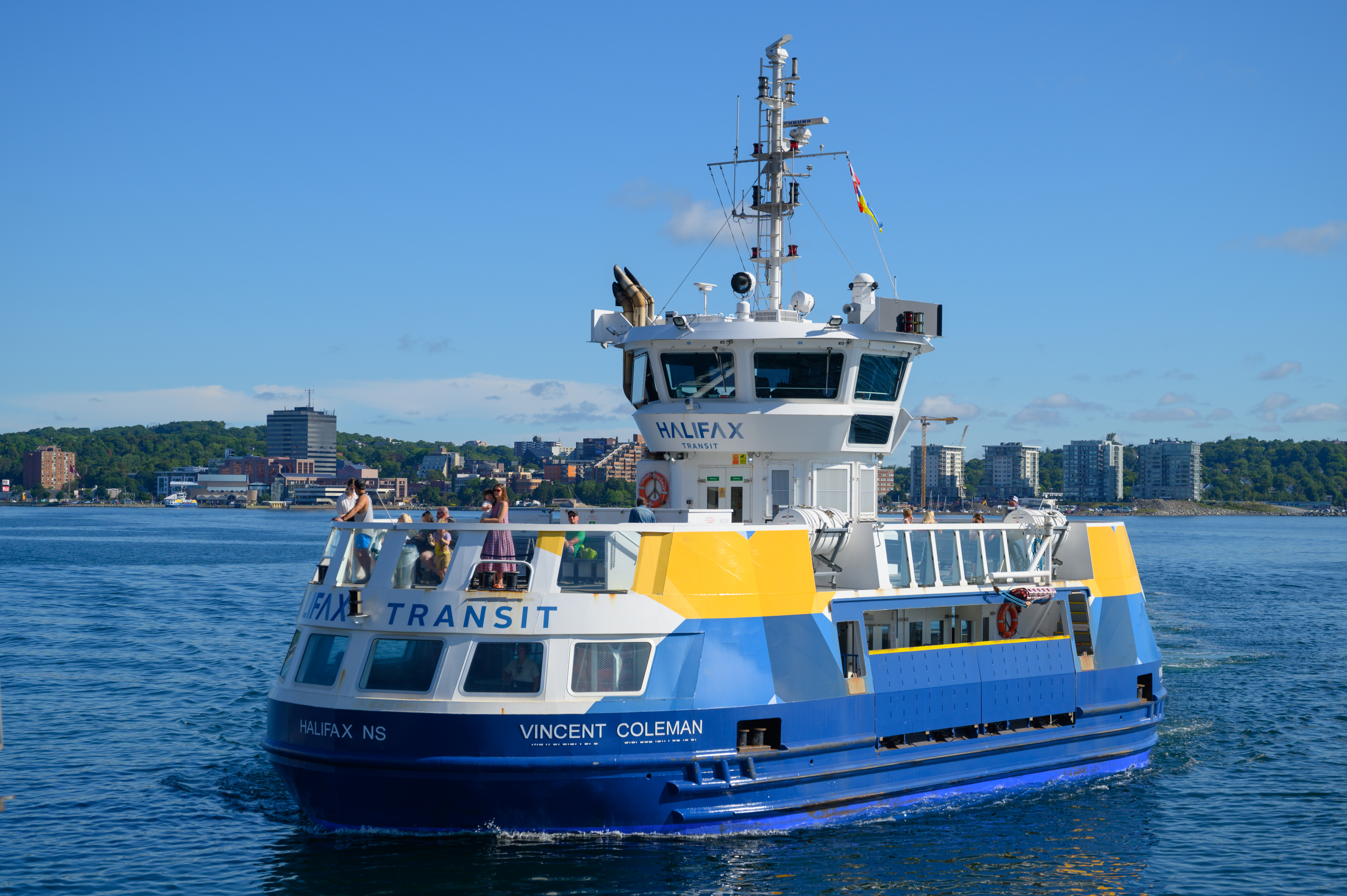
Halifax Transit ferry, Vincent Coleman, arriving from Alderney Landing

Halifax Transit also provides two passenger ferry routes, one connecting downtown Halifax with Alderney Landing in Dartmouth, and the other connecting with Woodside. Each route is serviced by a pair of vessels. The ferry services are integrated with the bus services; the fares are identical, and transfers are accepted between the two systems. The harbour ferries boarded approximately 1.7 million passengers in the 2024/25 fiscal year. Each ferry carries up to 398 passengers. All routes are handicap accessible and have provision to carry bicycles.

The agency operates a fleet of five ferries built in the 2010s by A. F. Theriault Shipyard. As of 2023, a third ferry route – connecting downtown Halifax and Bedford – is in planning.

=== Access-A-Bus ===
Halifax Transit also provides Access-A-Bus, a dial-a-ride paratransit service for people who cannot use the conventional transit service due to physical or cognitive disability. This was created in 1981, the same year Metro Transit was formed.

In the 2024/25 financial year, the Access-A-Bus service had approximately 171,000 boardings.

== Services ==
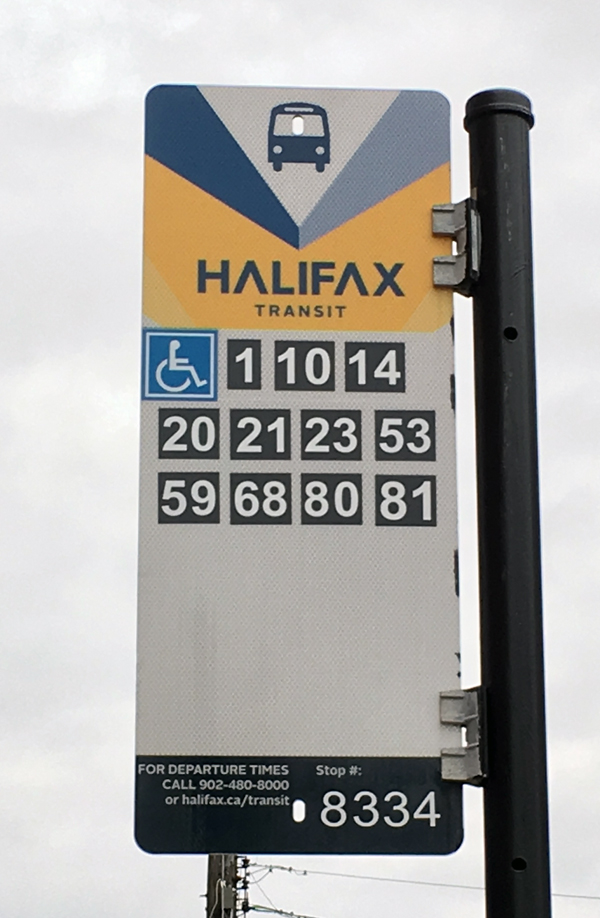
A Halifax Transit bus stop sign with new Departures Line info, high contrast route numbers, and Halifax Transit branding. Sign shows westbound routes from stop in front of Lord Nelson arcade on Spring Garden Road east of South Park Street.

=== Fares and passes ===
Halifax Transit has four main fare categories: Adult (18 years & up), Senior (65+ years), Child (13 – 17 years), and Student (for full-time students with valid student photo ID card). Anyone with a ticket, pass or transfer for the regular service can pay the difference in cash fare to use the more expensive Regional Express (MetroX) service. Monthly passes allow for unlimited use of ferries and buses, and are sold through various channels including municipal service centres, drug stores, some supermarkets, and the convenience store at the Bridge Terminal.

Digital tickets and passes can be purchased using HFXGO, the agency's free mobile fare payment app. Launched on November 2, 2023, the app is available for Android and iOS devices. Initially, digital tickets or passes had to be shown to the bus driver or ferry terminal attendant upon boarding. Fare validation machines have since been installed at ferry terminals and on buses.

A Canadian National Institute for the Blind (CNIB) identification card can be used to obtain free travel on Halifax Transit's buses and ferries. A university student bus pass (called U-pass) is available to students of Saint Mary's, Mount Saint Vincent, King's College, Dalhousie, Nova Scotia Community College (Halifax campuses) and Nova Scotia College of Art and Design. The cost is included in tuition fees. Halifax Transit offers a low-income bus pass sold for 50 per cent of the regular price to eligible applicants.

In 2021, Halifax Transit launched a pilot program to provide high school students with free transit passes. The program aims to provide youth with convenient transportation and encourage the use of public transit. The program is currently being piloted at all schools in the HRCE, and CSAP schools in the Halifax Regional Municipality, as well as for home-schooled students in the region, namely Dartmouth High School, École Mosaïque, École du Sommet, and Prince Andrew High School. In November 2022, council voted to expand the program to four Dartmouth junior high schools.

Transfers are issued upon request on all Halifax Transit buses and ferries. A transfer allows the user to transfer between multiple conventional route buses and ferries travelling in any direction without having to pay an additional fare. A transfer also allows users to transfer to MetroX buses at a reduced fare. Transfers are valid for 90 minutes after the last scheduled stop on the current run of the route where it was issued. Holders of a valid XPass (the monthly pass for the MetroX) do not require transfers.

=== Schedules and route information ===
Route information can be accessed through the Halifax Transit Departures number, (902) 480-8000. Individual route schedules are available on Halifax Transit's website. Most terminals have screens that display anticipated arrival times of buses that service the terminal.

=== Departures ===
In early 2016, Halifax Transit released their next-generation AVL-based system called Departures. The system was first launched on May 15, 2016, with the introduction of the Departures Line, and as of July 2016 the rollout of the updated Departures Board that replaces the older GoTime departure displays found at terminals across the system. The Departures Board works similar to the previous GoTime-based departures display, with the exception that instead of showing the next two bus arrival times, will display the bay number and the next bus departure time, either showing the next hour and minute or the number of minutes before the bus departs, or "delayed" if the bus is behind by a certain number of minutes. It will also only show buses set to arrive in the next while, versus the older display which would show "(not scheduled)" for any route not running at that point in time.

The Departures Line works similarly to the previous GoTime IVR (Interactive Voice Response) system. Instead of dialing "(902) 480-" plus the four-digit number found on bus stop signage, one dials (902) 480-8000 and following the voice responses, one would input the bus stop number to access route departure times. The system gives the estimated departure time if available, scheduled times if the bus is not reporting real-time data or is delayed by a number of minutes, adjusted time to depart when schedule adjustments are made, and will announce when a bus is arriving within the minute.

=== Accessibility ===
On December 16, 2016 Halifax Transit began piloting an automated stop announcement system on several bus routes, providing both auditory and visual notice of approaching bus stops, as well as announcing the route of each bus on arrival at a bus stop. By January 30, 2017, all conventional buses provided the automated stop announcement. As of June 8, 2017, all conventional buses in the Halifax Transit fleet were low floor and accessible to wheelchairs.

Although Halifax Transit's vehicle fleet is considered accessible, many of the bus stops are not. At some stops, the lack of an appropriate landing area prevents the deployment of a bus wheelchair ramp. Other stops lack sidewalk connections. Halifax Transit is upgrading bus stops and aims to make all stops accessible by 2030.

== Transit routes ==
=== Route number structure ===
As mentioned above, the Moving Forward Together Plan created a new classification system for bus routes, which is reflected in a new route numbering system:

- Corridor routes (numbered 1-19)
- Local routes (numbered 20-99)
- Express routes (numbered 100-199)
- Regional Express routes (numbered 300-399)
- Rural routes (numbered 400-499)

=== Current routes ===
Wheelchair – uses accessible low floor (ALF) buses only.
Rush hour service only.
Designated bike route.
MetroX service (see MetroX section above)

No.	Name	Type	Features	Inner terminal	Outer terminal	Notes/History
1	Spring Garden	Corridor	Handicapped/disabled access Bicycle facilities	Bridge Terminal	Mumford Terminal	
2	Fairview	Corridor	Handicapped/disabled access Bicycle facilities	Water Street Terminal	Lacewood Terminal	
3	Crosstown	Corridor	Handicapped/disabled access Bicycle facilities	Lacewood Terminal	Marketplace & Bancroft	
4	Universities	Corridor	Handicapped/disabled access Bicycle facilities	Dalhousie University	Lacewood Terminal	Used to provide service to Mount Saint Vincent University.
5	Portland	Corridor	Handicapped/disabled access Bicycle facilities	Barrington & Duke	Portland Hills Terminal	Replaces old routes 59, 61, and 68 on Portland Street
6ᴀ	Woodside	Corridor	Handicapped/disabled access Bicycle facilities	Bridge Terminal	Woodside Ferry Terminal	Partially replaces old route 63 Woodside. Weekdays only.
6ʙ	Eastern Passage	Corridor	Handicapped/disabled access Bicycle facilities	Bridge Terminal	Oceanview Manor	Replaces old route 60 Eastern Passage
6ᴄ	Heritage Hills	Corridor	Handicapped/disabled access Bicycle facilities	Bridge Terminal	Samuel Danial Drive	Replaces old route 60 Heritage Hills
7ᴀ	Peninsula	Corridor	Handicapped/disabled access Bicycle facilities	Northridge Loop	Northridge Loop	Travels in a clockwise loop
7ʙ	Peninsula	Corridor	Handicapped/disabled access Bicycle facilities	Northridge Loop	Northridge Loop	Travels in a counter-clockwise loop
8	Sackville	Corridor	Handicapped/disabled access Bicycle facilities	Upper Water Street	Sackville Terminal	Replaced route 80 Sackville
9ᴀ	Greystone - Fotherby	Corridor	Handicapped/disabled access Bicycle facilities	Upper Water St	Fotherby & Herring Cove	Replaced route 19 Greystone.
9ʙ	Herring Cove	Corridor	Handicapped/disabled access Bicycle facilities	Upper Water St	St Paul's & School	Replaced route 20 Herring Cove.
10ᴀ	Dalhousie-Dartmouth	Corridor	Handicapped/disabled access Bicycle facilities	Dalhousie University	Bridge Terminal	
10ʙ	Mic Mac Terminal	Corridor	Handicapped/disabled access Bicycle facilities	Dalhousie University	Mic Mac Terminal	
10ᴄ	Westphal	Corridor	Handicapped/disabled access Bicycle facilities	Dalhousie University	Raymoor & Main	
21	Timberlea	Local	Handicapped/disabled access Bicycle facilities	Lacewood Terminal	Charles Road	Used to service downtown Halifax.
22	Armdale	Local	Handicapped/disabled access Bicycle facilities	Mumford Terminal	Ragged Lake Transit Centre	
24	Leiblin Park	Local	Handicapped/disabled access Bicycle facilities	Inglis/Robie	Leiblin & Juniper	Shorter version of old route 14 Leiblin Park. No service to downtown.
25	Governors Brook	Local	Handicapped/disabled access Bicycle facilities	Mumford Terminal	Titanium Crescent	
26	Springvale	Local	Handicapped/disabled access Bicycle facilities	Mumford Terminal	Downs & Milsom	Replaces route old 5 but no longer travels downtown. Peak only.
28	Bayers Lake	Local	Handicapped/disabled access Bicycle facilities	Mumford Terminal	Lacewood Terminal	
29	Barrington	Local	Handicapped/disabled access Bicycle facilities	Point Pleasant Park	Bayers Road Centre	
30ᴀ	Clayton Park West	Local	Handicapped/disabled access Bicycle facilities	Lacewood Terminal	Lacewood Terminal	Travels in a clockwise loop.
30ʙ	Clayton Park West	Local	Handicapped/disabled access Bicycle facilities	Lacewood Terminal	Lacewood Terminal	Travels in a counter-clockwise loop.
39	Flamingo	Local	Handicapped/disabled access Bicycle facilities	Bridge Terminal	Lacewood Terminal	Partially replaced route 16 Parkland.
50	Dockyard-Shipyard	Local	Handicapped/disabled access Bicycle facilities	Bridge Terminal	Halifax Shipyard	Replaced former route 11 Dockyard. Peak only.
51	Windmill	Local	Handicapped/disabled access Bicycle facilities	Bridge Terminal	Princess Margaret Blvd (51A), Wrights Cove Terminal (51B)	51B operates during weekday peak hours only.
53	Highfield	Local	Handicapped/disabled access Bicycle facilities	Highfield Terminal	Alderney Gate	Replaced route 53 Notting Park (with simplified routing through Highfield Park and new extension to Alderney Ferry Terminal).
54	Montebello	Local	Handicapped/disabled access Bicycle facilities	Bridge Terminal	Breeze & Columbo	Revised route will service Bridge Terminal
55	Port Wallace	Local	Handicapped/disabled access Bicycle facilities	Bridge Terminal	Waverley/Charles Keating	Revised route, no services past Charles Keating
56	Dartmouth Crossing	Local	Handicapped/disabled access Bicycle facilities	Bridge Terminal	Wrights Cove Terminal	
58	Woodlawn	Local	Handicapped/disabled access Bicycle facilities	Portland Hills Terminal	Penhorn Terminal	Service to Portland Street/Bridge Terminal removed
59	Colby	Local	Handicapped/disabled access Bicycle facilities	Portland Hills Terminal	Colby Village	Service to Portland Street replaced by new route 5.
61	North Preston	Local	Handicapped/disabled access Bicycle facilities	Portland Hills Terminal	North Preston Turning Loop	Partially replaces route old 68 in Cole Harbour. No service to Bridge Terminal.
62	Grahams Grove	Local	Handicapped/disabled access Bicycle facilities	Bridge Terminal	Gaston Road	Replaces route 62 Wildwood and route 66 Penhorn.
63	Mount Edward	Local	Handicapped/disabled access Bicycle facilities	Penhorn Terminal	Portland Hills Terminal	Partially replaces route 62 Wildwood & 78 Mount Edward Express.
64	Burnside	Local	Handicapped/disabled access Bicycle facilities	Highfield Terminal	Marketplace & Bancroft	Replaces route 64 Akerley, no service to Bridge Terminal. Weekday only.
65	Caldwell	Local	Handicapped/disabled access Bicycle facilities	Portland Hills Terminal	Caldwell & Cole Harbour	Formerly known as 65 Astral until 2010.
67	Baker	Local	Handicapped/disabled access Bicycle facilities	Woodside Ferry Terminal	Mic Mac Terminal	Partially Replaces route 57 Baker and route 66 Penhorn.
68	Cherry Brook	Local	Handicapped/disabled access Bicycle facilities	Portland Hills Terminal	Cherry Brook & Main	Partially replaces old route 61 in Cole Harbour. Service to Portland replaced by new route 5.
72	Portland Hills	Local	Handicapped/disabled access Bicycle facilities	Portland Hills Terminal	Jennett/Wilkinson (Burnside Industrial Park)	
82	First Lake	Local	Handicapped/disabled access Bicycle facilities	Sackville Terminal	Cobequid Terminal	
83	Springfield	Local	Handicapped/disabled access Bicycle facilities	Sackville Terminal	Springfield Estates	
84	Glendale	Local	Handicapped/disabled access Bicycle facilities	Scotia Square	Sackville Terminal	Partially replaced route 87 Glendale, peak extension to Summer St.
85	Millwood	Local	Handicapped/disabled access Bicycle facilities	Sackville Terminal	Millwood & Sackville	Partially replaced route 82 Millwood
86	Beaverbank	Local	Handicapped/disabled access Bicycle facilities	Sackville Terminal	Kinsac Community Centre	Replaced route 400 Beaver Bank in 2019. No service to North Beaver Bank.
87	Sackville – Dartmouth	Local	Handicapped/disabled access Bicycle facilities	Bridge Terminal	Sackville Terminal	Partially replaced route 87 Glendale
88	Bedford Commons	Local	Handicapped/disabled access Bicycle facilities	Sackville Terminal	Bedford Commons	
90	Larry Uteck	Local	Handicapped/disabled access Bicycle facilities	Water Street Terminal	West Bedford Park & Ride	
91	Hemlock Ravine	Local	Handicapped/disabled access Bicycle facilities	Mumford Terminal	West Bedford Park & Ride	Partially replaced route 81 Hemlock Ravine
93	Bedford Highway	Local	Handicapped/disabled access Bicycle facilities	Scotia Square	Cobequid Terminal	Peak only.
123	Timberlea Express	Express	Handicapped/disabled access Bicycle facilities	Scotia Square	Charles Road	Weekday service only. Renumbered from route 23.
127	Cowie Hill Express	Express	Handicapped/disabled access Bicycle facilities	Scotia Square	Cowie Hill & Peter Saulnier	Weekday peak service only. Formerly route 32.
135	Flamingo Express	Express	Handicapped/disabled access Bicycle facilities	Scotia Square	Mount Saint Vincent University	Weekday service only.
136	Farnham Gate Express	Express	Handicapped/disabled access Bicycle facilities	Scotia Square	Wentworth & Dunbrack	Weekday service only.
137	Clayton Park Express	Express	Handicapped/disabled access Bicycle facilities	Scotia Square	Regency Park Dr. & Lacewood Dr.	Weekday service only.
138	Parkland Express	Express	Handicapped/disabled access Bicycle facilities	Scotia Square	Dunbrack & Ross	Weekday service only.
158	Woodlawn Express	Express	Handicapped/disabled access Bicycle facilities	University Ave	Portland Hills Terminal	Replaces route 58 Woodlawn at peak times.
159	Colby Express	Express	Handicapped/disabled access Bicycle facilities	University Ave	Colby Village	Replaces route 59 Colby at peak times.
161	North Preston Express	Express	Handicapped/disabled access Bicycle facilities	University Ave	North Preston Loop	Replaces route 61 North Preston at peak times.
165	Caldwell Express	Express	Handicapped/disabled access Bicycle facilities	University Ave	Astral Drive	Replaces route 65 Caldwell at peak times.
168ᴀ	Auburn Express	Express	Handicapped/disabled access Bicycle facilities	University Ave	Auburn Drive	Replaces route 68 Cherry Brook at peak times.
168ʙ	Cherry Brook Express	Express	Handicapped/disabled access Bicycle facilities	University Ave	Cherry Brook Road	Replaces route 68 Cherry Brook at peak times.
178	Mount Edward Express	Express	Handicapped/disabled access Bicycle facilities	Woodside Ferry Terminal	Cole Harbour Place	Peak only. Route has been temporarily suspended since February 2023 due to staff shortages.
179	Cole Harbour Express	Express	Handicapped/disabled access Bicycle facilities	Woodside Ferry Terminal	Cole Harbour Road	Peak only. Route has been temporarily suspended since February 2023 due to staff shortages.
182	First Lake Express	Express	Handicapped/disabled access Bicycle facilities	Summer/Bell	Sackville Terminal	Replaced route 82 First Lake at peak times.
183	Springfield Express	Express	Handicapped/disabled access Bicycle facilities	Summer Street	Springfield Avenue	
185	Millwood Express	Express	Handicapped/disabled access Bicycle facilities	Bell/Summer	Millwood & Sackville	Replaced route 85 Millwood at peak times.
186	Beaverbank Express	Express	Handicapped/disabled access Bicycle facilities	Scotia Square	Kinsac Community Centre	Peak only.
192	Hemlock Ravine Express	Express	Handicapped/disabled access Bicycle facilities	Summer Street	Southgate Drive	Weekday service only.
194	West Bedford Express	Express	Handicapped/disabled access Bicycle facilities	Summer & Trollope	West Bedford Park & Ride	Weekday service only.
196	Basinview Express	Express	Handicapped/disabled access Bicycle facilities	Summer & Trollope	Hwy 1 & Rockmanor	Weekday service only.
320	Airport/Fall River	Regional express	Handicapped/disabled access Bicycle facilities	Scotia Square	Halifax Stanfield International Airport	
330ᴀ	Tantallon	Regional express	Bicycle facilities Handicapped/disabled access	Scotia Square	Tantallon Park & Ride	Weekday service only. Does not service Sheldrake Lake Park & Ride. New, August 2026.
330ʙ	Tantallon-Sheldrake Lake	Regional express	Bicycle facilities Handicapped/disabled access	Scotia Square	Tantallon Park & Ride	Weekday service only. Original route 330 Tantallon prior to August 2026.
370	Porters Lake	Regional express	Handicapped/disabled access Bicycle facilities	Scotia Square	Porters Lake Park & Ride	Weekday service only.
401	Porters Lake	Rural	Handicapped/disabled access Bicycle facilities	Portland Hills Terminal	Porters Lake Park & Ride	
415	Purcells Cove	Rural	Handicapped/disabled access Bicycle facilities	Mumford Terminal	York Redoubt	Weekday service only.
433	Tantallon	Rural	Handicapped/disabled access Bicycle facilities	Lacewood Terminal	Tantallon Park & Ride	Weekday service only.

== Rapid Transit Network ==
In May 2020, Halifax Transit presented a plan to regional council to implement a new Rapid Transit Strategy. The strategy proposes the creation of a new Rapid Transit Network comprising four new bus rapid transit (BRT) lines and three new ferry routes. The estimated capital cost is around C$300–325 million, while operational costs are estimated at $15–22 million. Halifax Regional Council unanimously endorsed the plan on May 26, 2020.

As of 2021, Halifax is seeking funding for the project from other levels of government. Funding for the planning and design of one of the proposed ferry routes, the Halifax-Mill Cove (Bedford) service, was announced in June 2021. Halifax Transit originally planned to launch the service in 2024.. As of September 2026, nothing has been built.

== In popular culture ==
- The characters of Phillip and Phillmore the ferry twins from the children's TV show Theodore Tugboat are modelled after the Halifax-Dartmouth ferries.

== See also ==
- Transportation in the Halifax Regional Municipality
