= Metro Express (Chinese newspaper) =

Chinese-language newspaper

- Type: Metro newspaper
- Founded: March 1, 2004
- Ceased publication: January 1, 2020
- Headquarters: Tianjin
- Website: epaper.tianjinwe.com/cskb

The Metro Express (Chinese: 城市快报), or Chengshi Kuaibao, originally named City Express (都市快报), was a Tianjin-based Chinese-language newspaper published in China. It was the only metro newspaper in Tianjin.

Metro Express was officially launched on March 1, 2004. On January 1, 2020, the newspaper stopped publication.

== History ==
On March 1, 2004, Metro Express was launched by Tianjin Daily Press Group (天津日报报业集团). On January 1, 2020, it officially ceased publication.
