= Regional Centre, Halifax Regional Municipality =

Regional Centre
- Municipal subregion
- Location within Nova Scotia
- Coordinates: 44°39′03″N 63°34′57″W
- Country: Canada
- Province: Nova Scotia
- Municipality: Halifax Regional Municipality
- Communities: Dartmouth, Halifax
- Established: 2014

Area
  - Total: 33 km^{2} (13 sq mi)

Population (2016)
  - Total: 96,619
  - Density: 2,927/km^{2} (7,580/sq mi)
- Telephone Exchanges: 782, 902

The Regional Centre of the Halifax Regional Municipality is an area within Halifax that was designated in 2014 under the 2014 Regional Plan. The plan guides urban growth within the area for the foreseeable future.

== Geography ==
The Regional Centre comprises portions of the communities of Dartmouth and Halifax. The total land area of the Regional Centre is 3,300 ha (8,200 acres).

=== Dartmouth segment ===
Dartmouth's portion of the Regional Centre is the land within Highway 111. The business district for the area is Downtown Dartmouth.

=== Halifax segment ===
Halifax's portion of the Regional Centre is solely the Halifax Peninsula. The business district for the area is Downtown Halifax.

=== Future growth nodes ===
Centre Plan "Package A" outlines ten future growth nodes throughout the Regional Centre, they are:

==== Dartmouth future growth nodes ====
- Dartmouth Cove Lands
- M District
- Penhorn Lands
- Shannon Park Lands

==== Halifax future growth nodes ====
- Halifax Shopping Centre Lands
- Joseph Howe Rail Lands
- Kempt Road Lands
- Strawberry Hill Lands
- West End Mall Lands
- Young Street Lands

== Demographics ==
In 2016, 96,619 people lived within 55,332 dwellings throughout the municipal subregion. Furthermore, approximately 94,000 people work within the Regional Centre, which gives a commuter-adjusted population of approximately 190,619 people. The population density was approximately 29 inhabitants per hectare (2,900/km^{2}; 7,500/sq mi).

Two goals of the plan is to increase the residential units by 18,000 units by 2031. Additionally, the plan is to increase the population from 96,619 people in 2016 to 130,000 people by 2031.

== Government ==
Halifax Regional Council, is the Regional Centre's government. The Regional Centre includes the following districts:

- District 3: Dartmouth South-Eastern Passage
- District 4: Cole Harbour-Westphal-Lake Loon-Cherry Brook
- District 5: Dartmouth Centre
- District 6: Harbourview-Burnside-Dartmouth East
- District 7: Halifax South Downtown
- District 8: Halifax Peninsula North
- District 9: Halifax West Armdale
