= MetroX =

Rural express bus service operated by Halifax Transit

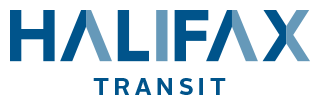

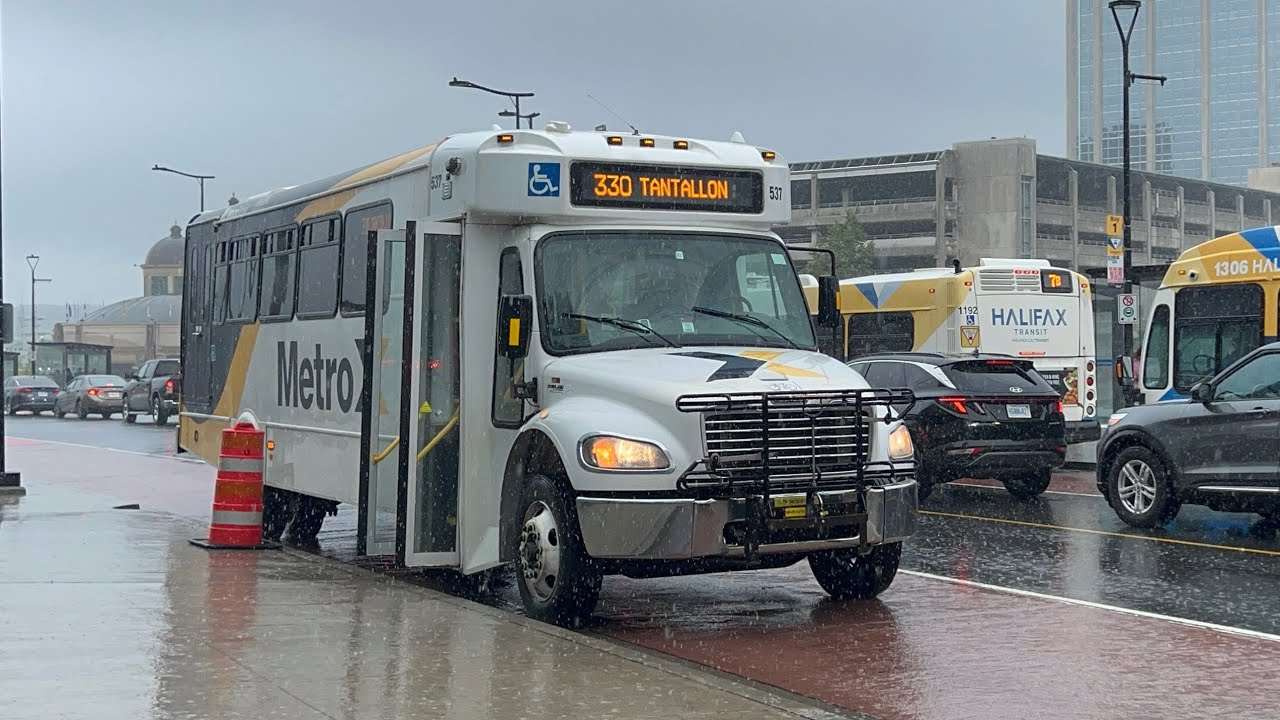

Overview
- Area served: Upper Tantallon; Sheldrake Lake (Hubley);Halifax Stanfield International Airport; Porters Lake
- Locale: Halifax, Nova Scotia
- Transit type: Bus
- Number of lines: 3 express routes
- Key people: Robin Gerus, Executive Director
- Headquarters: 80 Grassy Lake Drive, Halifax, Nova Scotia
- Website: http://halifax.ca/transit

Operation
- Began operation: August 31, 2009
- Ended operation: 2025 (Brand) 2020 (On Timetables)
- Operator: Halifax Transit

MetroX was a rural express bus service operating in the Canadian province of Nova Scotia. Operated by Halifax Transit, MetroX service is available on three limited-stop fully accessible express routes within the Halifax Regional Municipality. All routes linked to downtown Halifax, with one from Upper Tantallon, one from Fall River and Halifax Stanfield International Airport, and one from Porters Lake.

== History ==
The MetroX service began on August 31, 2009 with weekday service from Upper Tantallon to Downtown Halifax on route 330. On May 31, 2012, daily service along the Highway 102 corridor began between Halifax Stanfield International Airport and Downtown Halifax commenced. Route 370 running from Downtown Halifax to Porters Lake began service on November 18, 2013.

Routes 330 and 370 were renamed to "Regional Express" around 2016-2017, exact dates are unknown. Buses used on MetroX routes still had MetroX branding. The original GMC cutaway buses used on Route 330 ordered in 2009, were retired in 2018, with 2 of the buses going to Bridgewater Transit.

Route 320 kept its MetroX name on Halifax Transit timetables until around 2020 when the MetroX part was dropped. The Nova Bus LFS buses assigned to Route 320 and 330 were repainted into a special variant of the Halifax Transit livery, with icons of planes on the side of the bus and new "AIRPORT EXPRESS" lettering. The buses were repainted between May 2020 and Early 2023.

The 2013 Glaval Bus Legacy buses retained their MetroX livery, only being used on Route 330 after 2020. 540 retired in 2020 and was auctioned off. The rest were retired between August and November 2025.

MetroX logos can still be found on the Park & Ride entrance signs in Sheldrake Lake & Fall River, as those signs have not been replaced.

== MetroX Routes ==
MetroX routes were limited-stop services, stopping only at major terminals and the rural destinations.

All MetroX routes still operate under the Regional Express name.

330 Tantallon/Sheldrake Lake

Route 330 Tantallon/Sheldrake Lake provides express service between Upper Tantallon, Sheldrake Lake (Hubley) and Duke/Albemarle Street, along the Highway 103 corridor. The route stops at the following locations:

- Upper Tantallon (Hubley Centre)
- Sheldrake Lake (Hubley)
- Duke/Albemarle Street

The route originally operated on three variations, Halifax to Sheldrake Lake onto Upper Tantallon, Halifax to Sheldrake Lake and Halifax to Upper Tantallon (and vice versa), before being simplified later on to the normal route variations (Halifax-Tantallon, Tantallon-Halifax).

Route 330 was split into Routes 330A & 330B in August 2026, with Route 330A providing direct service to Tantallon Park & Ride, skipping Sheldrake Lake.

320 Airport-Fall River

Route 320 Airport provides express service between Halifax Stanfield International Airport and Duke/Albemarle Street, along Highway 102, Highway 118 and Highway 111. The route stops at the following locations:

- Halifax Stanfield International Airport
- Aerotech Business Park
- Fall River
- Dartmouth (Bridge Terminal)
- Duke/Albemarle Street

370 Porters Lake

Route 370 Porters Lake provides service in the Highway 107 corridor between Duke/Albemarle Street and Porters Lake. The route stops at the following locations:

- Porters Lake
- Dartmouth (Bridge Terminal)
- Duke/Albemarle Street

== Fare Structure ==
Effective September 1, 2025

Halifax Transit charged an additional $1.00 for MetroX routes, its fare structure was separate from the rest of the system. Transfers received on Regional Express routes can be used to transfer onto a conventional bus.

Current Fares as of September 1, 2025.

Category	Cash Fare	Additional Fare	Monthly Pass
Adult	$4.75	+$1.50	$139.00
Senior	$3.00	+$1.00	$99.00
Youth	$3.00	+$1.00	$99.00
Child	Free	N/A	N/A

== Fleet ==
No.	Manufacturer	Model	Year	Garage	Notes	Status
526-534	Nova Bus	Nova Bus LFS	April 2012	Ragged Lake	Originally had the MetroX livery, but all units were repainted into a new "Airport Express" between May 2020 to 2023. Assigned to routes 320 and 330.	All units active

== Retired ==
No.	Manufacturer	Model	Year	Garage	Status	Notes
516-525	Glaval Bus	Titan	2009	Ragged Lake (Moved from Burnside in August 2010)	All units retired between 2017 and 2018. 524 and 525 were donated to Bridgewater Transit.	516 was repainted into the Halifax Transit Livery.
535-540	Glaval Bus	Legacy	Oct. 2013	Ragged Lake	Assigned to Route 330. Retired between August and November 2025.	

== See also ==
- Halifax Transit
- Halifax Regional Municipality
