= Clayton Park, Nova Scotia =

Clayton Park
- Community
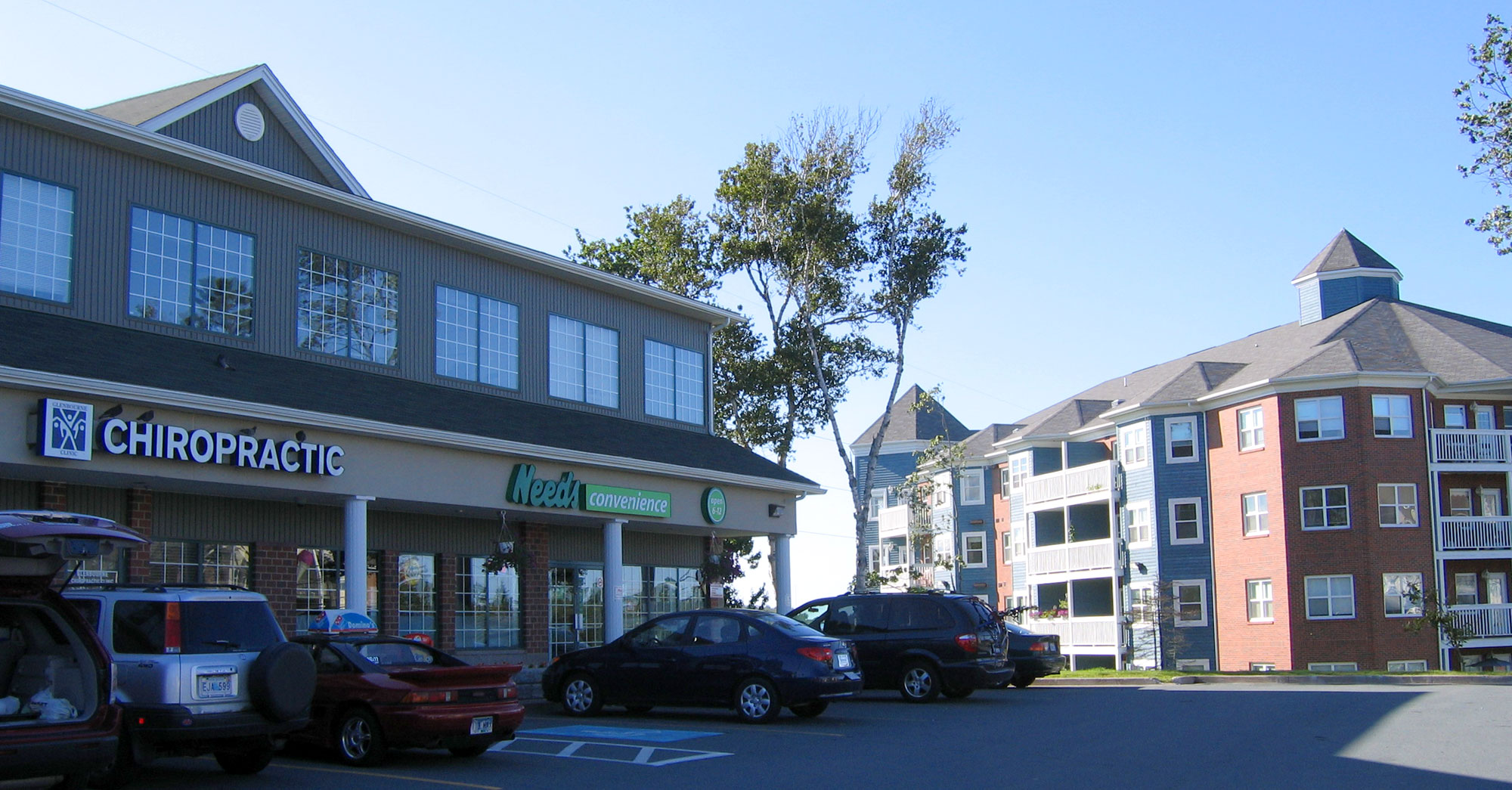
- A mix of retail and residential

- Location within Nova Scotia
- Coordinates: 44°39′25″N 63°39′02″W
- Country: Canada
- Province: Nova Scotia
- Municipality: Halifax Regional Municipality
- Community council: Peninsula Council
- Planning Area: Clayton Park
- Clayton Park communities: Clayton Park West, Bayers Lake Business Park

Area
  - Total: 1.05 km^{2} (0.41 sq mi)

Population (2021)
  - Total: 5,201
  - Density: 4,900/km^{2} (13,000/sq mi)
- GNBC code: CAHFL

Clayton Park is a community within Halifax, Nova Scotia, Canada.

== History ==
The community of Clayton Park is named after a family that owned property in the area extending up the southern slope of Geizer's Hill.

On 12 July 1962, the Clayton Park development began when it received approval from the Municipality of the County of Halifax. Clayton Park was created as an upper middle class community and its prime developer was the Shaw company, which placed certain architectural requirements for houses and apartments, among which was a high percentage of brick; Shaw being the largest brick manufacturer in Atlantic Canada. Primary house colours consisted of earthy tones of browns, greens, greys, and adobe reds which were popular for the mid-century post and beam house styles of the 1950s. Canadian architects Peter Dickinson, Henry Fliess, James A. Murray and Venchiarutti & Venchiarutti can be attributed to many of the Modern house designs.

In 1969, Armdale, Clayton Park, Fairview, Rockingham, and Spryfield were all amalgamated into the City of Halifax. In 1975, part of the development was altered slightly to the south side of Geizer's Hill. As regional water and sewer services extended post-1969, commercial and residential development followed until the main phase was completed by the late 1970s and early 1980s.

Clayton Park West was created adjacent to Clayton Park after decades of growth. With the extensions to Highway 102 of both Dunbrack Street/Northwest Arm Drive in the 1980s, and Lacewood Drive in the 1990s--the Shaw company created the new community; envisioned to comprise a mixture of upscale apartments, condominiums, single-family--and--multi-family residences with complementary retail developments. The development was planned to fill in over a 20-year period, however a change to the Bayer's Lake Industrial Park (BLIP) from light-industrial to businesses mostly consisting of warehouse-style retailers (it was renamed to Bayer's Lake Business Park), saw Clayton Park West expand with the highest rate of urban growth in Nova Scotia's history. The area was filled within four years and now extends Rockingham from the Bedford Basin to Highway 102.

On 1 April 1996, Halifax County was dissolved and all of its places (cities, suburbs, towns, and villages) were turned into communities of a single-tier municipality named Halifax Regional Municipality. Subsequently, Clayton Park and Clayton Park West were both turned into communities within the new Municipality of Halifax.

== Geography ==
The community of Clayton Park covers approximately 105 ha (260 acres) of land. Bordered by Fairview to its south and Rockingham to its north--north-east, it is located within the urban area (population centre) of Halifax.

Adjacent to the community of Clayton Park is the community of Clayton Park West. Clayton Park West is approximately 58 ha (140 acres), according to the 2013 Urban Forest Master Plan (based on 2011 Census Data).

== Demographics ==
Clayton Park corresponds to Census Tract 2050025.01 and has a population of 5,201 as of 2021. From 2016 to 2021, the community grew by over 10% from 4,726 people in 2016 to 5,201 people in 2021. One of the densest urban communities in Halifax, the population density increased from 45 people per hectare in 2016, to 49 people per hectare in 2021.

Although a well-established community, Clayton Park West has no approximate population estimates.

Clayton Park population history
Year	Pop.	±%
2016	4,726	—
2021	5,201	+10.1%

== Parks, trails, and recreation ==
The Clayton Park area is home to an extensive network of parks, walking trails, and recreation facilities.

Belchers Marsh Park

Belchers Marsh Park consists of the large Belchers Marsh on the east side of Parkland Drive and the smaller Little Belchers Pond on the west side of Parkland Drive. A network of walking trails serves both the pond and marsh areas and connects the two areas together via a riverside trail which crosses Farnham Gate Road and Parkland Drive.

The Belchers Marsh Park trail network consists of segments through forested areas, open areas along the shores of the marsh and in some sections follows the riverside, providing a variety of environments to enjoy. Benches are located around the Belchers Marsh segment of the trails, along with a lookoff platform for viewing the surrounding area. Connector pathways are provided to the surrounding residential streets with trailheads available at various locations along Parkland Drive (between Langbrae Drive and Heathside Crescent), as well as from Farnham Gate Road, Langbrae Drive, Red Fern Terrace and Tayberry Court.

Wildlife is common in the area with deer frequently seen attempting to navigate across the very busy Parkland Drive. Ducks also come and go from Belchers Marsh at various times of the year. Small fish can easily be seen in the water along the shores of the marsh.

Mainland North Linear Parkway

A large segment of the Mainland North Linear Parkway, a wooded footpath, also runs through the Clayton Park West area. The parkway begins at the intersection of Parkland Drive and Kearney Lake Road and follows the wide sidewalk along the east side of Parkland Drive for approximately 500m before branching off into a proper trail near Castlepark Grove. The trail then continues in a straight line for approximately 4 km before terminating at Main Avenue in the community of Fairview.

The Clayton Park West segment of the Mainland North Linear Parkway trail provides numerous connections along its route. The trail passes the Glenbourne Sports Field (located along the north end of Parkland Drive), the Park West School property (located on Langbrae Drive) and the Mainland Common (located on Lacewood Drive).

The parkway uses marked crosswalks to cross several major roads including Farnham Gate Road, Langbrae Drive, Radcliffe Drive, and Lacewood Drive.

Connector pathways and trails are provided to various nearby streets, including (from North to South) Gorsebud Close, Edward Laurie Drive/Beechwood Terrace, Heathside Crescent, Moss Court, Remmington Court, Scotch Pine Terrace, Montgomery Court, Glenbourne Court, Parkmount Close, Turnmill Drive, Thackery Close, Brackley Place, Stockleigh Place, Essex Lane, Warwick Lane, and Barkton Lane.

Glenbourne Sports Field

The Glenbourne Sports Field is located along the northern section of Parkland Drive, with the entrance located just north of Heathside Crescent. This park provides a soccer field, baseball diamond, basketball court, children's playground, and is one of the many access points to the Mainland North Linear Parkway trail. Parking is available in the parking lot and along Parkland Drive.

Veterans Memorial Park

Veterans Memorial Park is a small open-air corner park located at the corner of Parkland Drive and Langbrae Drive. A bench and gazebo are provided and the park is used as a gathering place for various community events.

Langbrae-Turnmill Park

Langbrae-Turnmill Park is located near the intersection of Langbrae Drive and Turnmill Drive and an entrance to the park is provided from each street. A small playground and some short wooded trails are provided here, as well as a connection to the Mainland North Linear Parkway trail.

Stratford Way Park

Stratford Way Park is located on Stratford Way. This is an open-air park with large open space, a playground, basketball court, gazebo, and community art project.

Sheffield In The Park

This is a small sports field and grassy area located off Dunbrack Street between Lincoln Cross and Knightsridge Drive. Access is provided via Meadowlark Crescent.

Armstrong Court Park

Armstrong Court Park is a small neighbourhood park located on Armstrong Court (accessible from Kearney Lake Road via Castlehill Drive). The park provides a playground and benches in a small wooded area. Tennis courts are also available.

D.J. Butler Park

This open-air park is located on Flamingo Drive and provides a large open grassy area, playground, tennis court and basketball court.

Willett Street Park

Willett Street Park is a small wooded park located on Willett Street across from Harlington Crescent. A short trail connects Willett Street to the Mainland North Linear Parkway and the Mainland Common. This park was selected as one of the potential locations for a new Halifax Transit bus terminal, in which case it would likely be demolished.

Northcliffe Centre

The Northcliffe Centre was formerly a regional recreation facility located on Dunbrack Street at Clayton Park Drive. The facility offered a pool, tennis courts, basketball courts and other amenities. It served the area for many decades before being replaced by the Canada Games Centre on Lacewood Drive. It has since closed and is scheduled to be demolished. The Northcliffe Centre property was one of several sites identified as a possible location for a new Halifax Transit bus terminal.

Mainland Common

The Mainland Common is a large regional recreation area consisting of parkland, trails, and various municipal facilities. The large Canada Games Centre is located here, as is the Keshen Goodman Public Library, and Halifax West High School. The Mainland Common also provides indoor and outdoor all-weather sports fields, and baseball diamonds. Access to facilities is provided via Thomas Raddal Drive which is accessible from either Lacewood Drive, or Regency Park Drive.

Canada Games Centre

The Canada Games Centre is a large facility that was constructed in conjunction with the 2011 Canada Winter Games, which Halifax hosted in February 2011.

Major components of the centre include an Aquatics Centre with several types of pools, waterslides, sauna, and a hot tub. Swimming lessons and aquatic exercise classes are available.

The Recreation Centre provides a field house with hardwood court space and an elevated indoor six-lane running track. Other programs are provided, such as after school childcare, child minding, playschool, day and summer camp programs, and various educational programs.

The Fitness Centre component offers 11,500 sq. feet of naturally lit workout space. 75 pieces of cardio equipment are provided, as well as pin-select and free-weights, a spin bike studio with 25 bikes, and a yoga studio. Programs offered include group exercise classes, fitness & nutrition programs, and personal training sessions.

== Transportation ==
=== Halifax Transit routes ===
Public transportation is provided by Halifax Transit. Lacewood Terminal, located on 320 Lacewood Drive, provides the user with exurban, suburban, and urban destinations throughout the municipality.

Wheelchair – Uses Accessible Low Floor (ALF) buses only.
Rush Hour Service Only
Designated Bike Route
MetroLink Service
MetroX Service

Route number	Route name	Features	Inner terminal	Outer terminal	Notes
2	Fairview	Handicapped/disabled access Bicycle facilities	Water Street Terminal	Lacewood Terminal	
3	Crosstown	Handicapped/disabled access Bicycle facilities	Lacewood Terminal	Marketplace & Bancroft	
4	Universities	Handicapped/disabled access Bicycle facilities	Dalhousie University	Lacewood Terminal	
21	Timberlea	Handicapped/disabled access Bicycle facilities	Lacewood Terminal	Charles Road	
28	Bayers Lake	Handicapped/disabled access Bicycle facilities	Mumford Terminal	Lacewood Terminal	
30 (30ᴀ/30ʙ)	Clayton Park West	Handicapped/disabled access Bicycle facilities	Lacewood Terminal	Lacewood Terminal	30ᴀ travels in a clockwise direction, and 30ʙ travels in a counter-clockwise direction.
39	Flamingo	Handicapped/disabled access Bicycle facilities	Bridge Terminal	Lacewood Terminal	
135	Flamingo Express	Handicapped/disabled access Bicycle facilities	Scotia Square	Mount Saint Vincent University	Weekday service only.
136	Farnham Gate Express	Handicapped/disabled access Bicycle facilities	Scotia Square	Wentworth & Dunbrack	Weekday service only.
137	Clayton Park Express	Handicapped/disabled access Bicycle facilities	Scotia Square	Lacewood Drive & Regency Park Drive	Weekday service only.
138	Parkland Express	Handicapped/disabled access Bicycle facilities	Scotia Square	Dunbrack & Ross	Weekday service only.
433	Tantallon	Handicapped/disabled access Bicycle facilities	Lacewood Terminal	Tantallon	Weekday service only.

== In popular culture ==
Alternative rock band Thrush Hermit's fifth and final album is Clayton Park.

Nova Scotian rock group Joel Plaskett Emergency reference Clayton Park at 0:41 in their song "Drunk Teenagers".

== Gallery ==
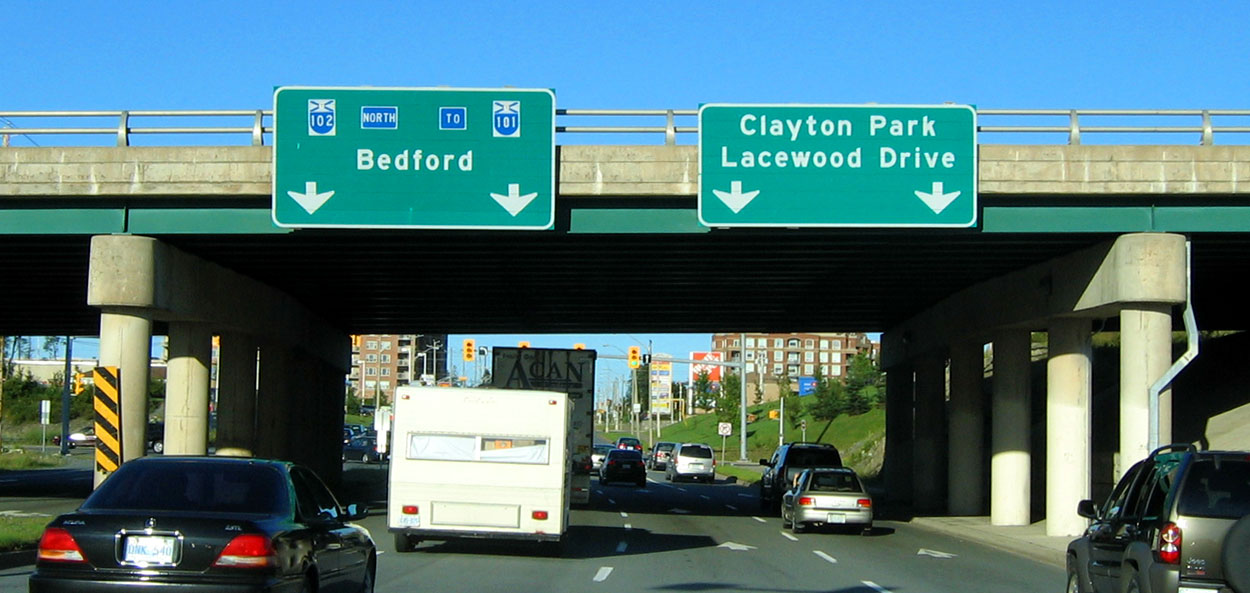
Entering Clayton park from Bayers Lake.

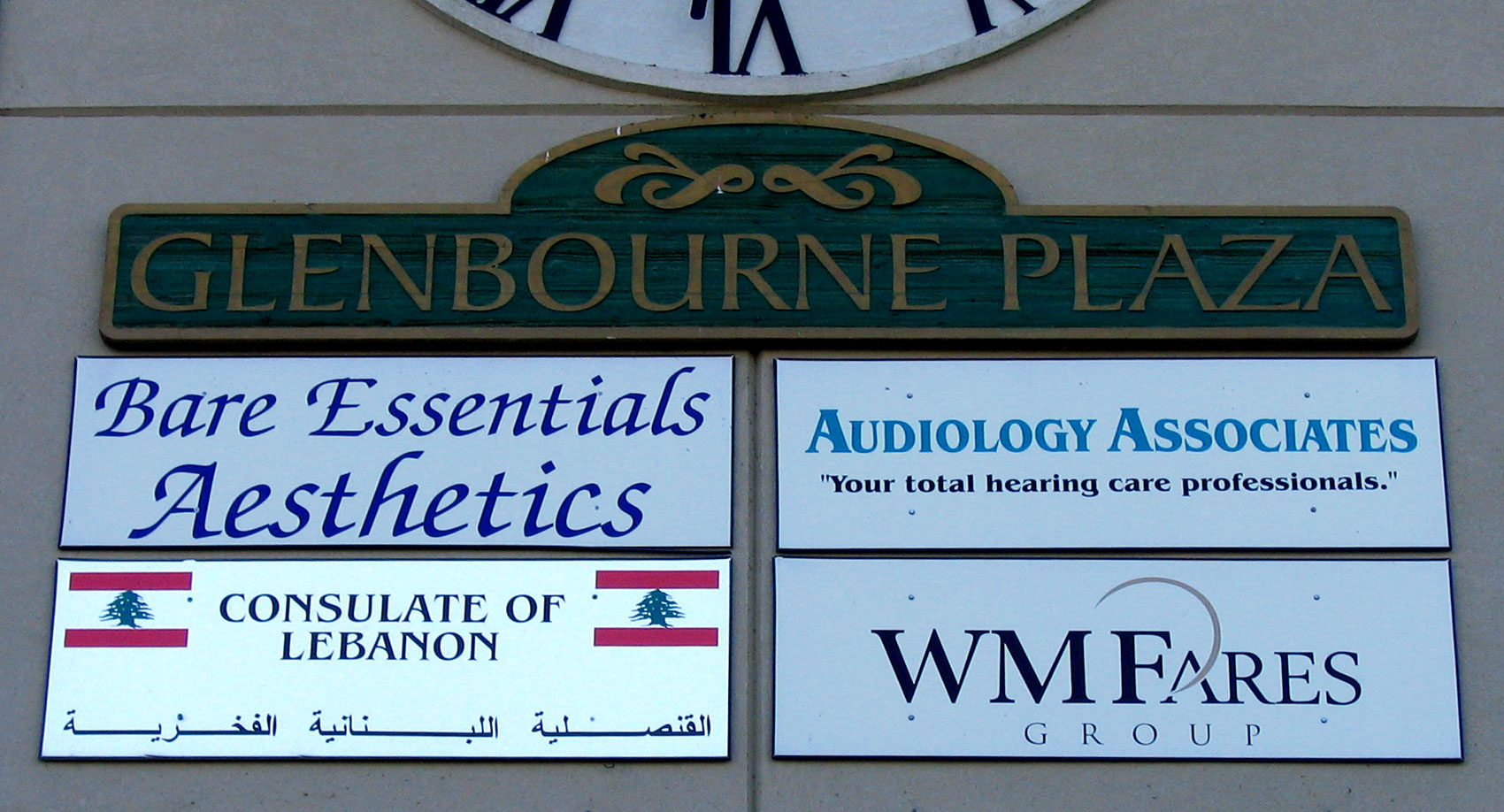
Consulate of Lebanon, Clayton Park West

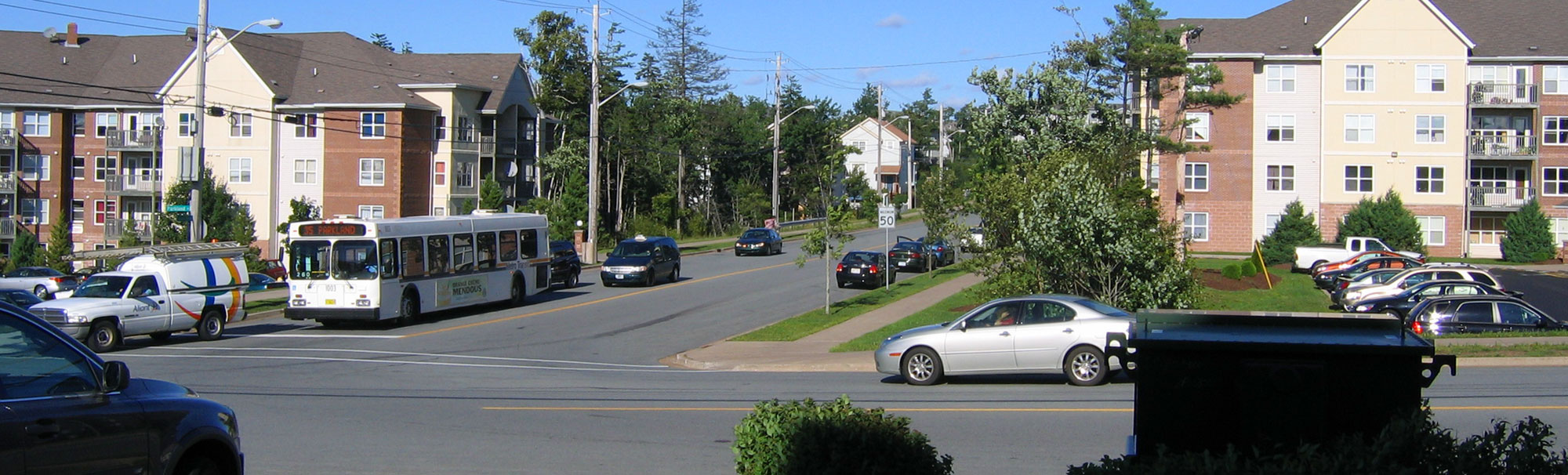
Busy intersection, Clayton park West.

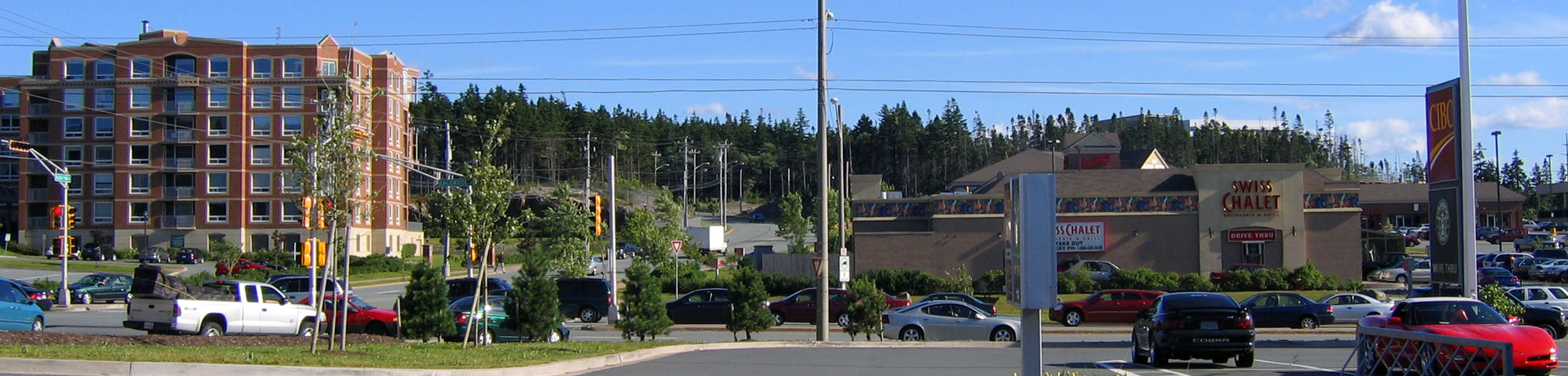
Retail and residential mix, Clayton Park.
