= Nova Scotia Route 344 =

Highway in Nova Scotia, Canada

Route 344

Route information
- Maintained by Nova Scotia Department of Transportation and Infrastructure Renewal
- Length: 47 km (29 mi)

Major junctions
- South end: Trunk 16 in Boylston
- North end: Trunk 4 in Auld's Cove

Location
- Country: Canada
- Province: Nova Scotia
- Counties: Guysborough

Highway system
- Provincial highways in Nova Scotia; 100-series
← Route 341	→ Route 347

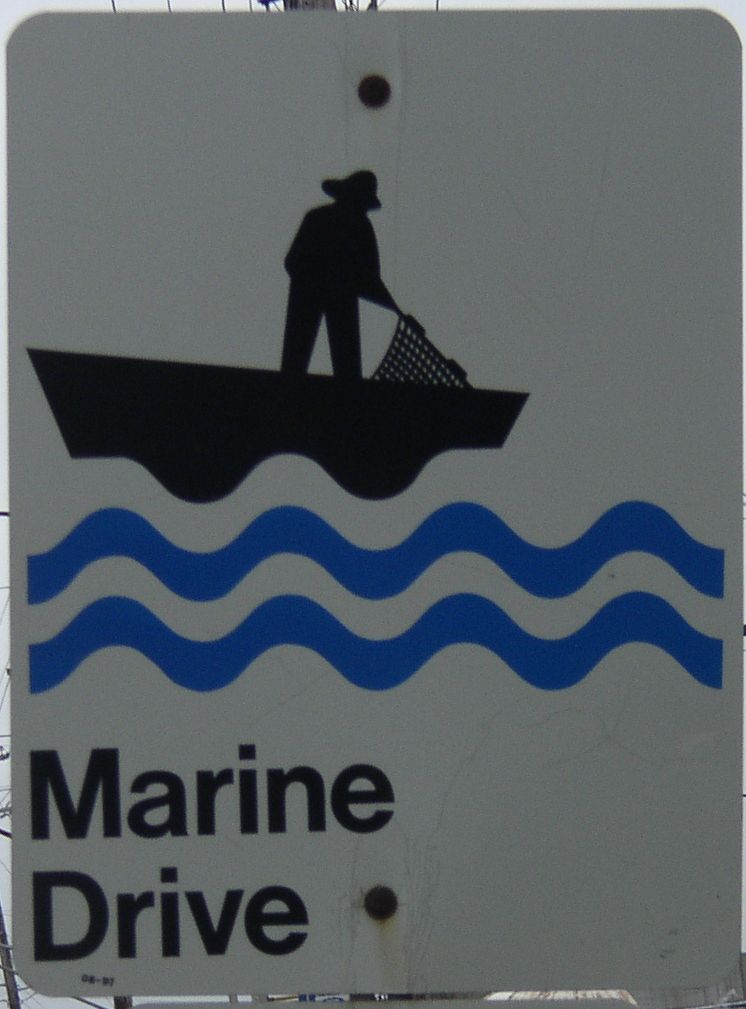
Part of Marine Drive

Route 344 is a north-south collector road in the Canadian province of Nova Scotia. It is, generally, situated east of the province's mainland, in Guysborough County.

It connects Auld's Cove at Trunk 4 with Boylston at Trunk 16.

== Route ==
Route 334 begins in Boylston, on route 16. At the beginning it travels east for about twenty kilometers, following the north shore to Chedabucto Bay, afterwards it turns northwest at Hadleyville, where it continues to follow the shore. It then follows the southwest shore of the Canso Strait, notably going to Mulgrave, a town adjacent to Port Hawkesbury. The route finishes at exit 40 (an intersection) of the Trans-Canada Highway, a multiplex of routes 104 and 4, barely 1 kilometer west of the Canso Causeway.

== Communities ==
- Auld's Cove, km 47
- Mulgrave, km 42
- Pirate Harbour, km 39
- Steep Creek, km 34
- Middle Melford, km 31
- Sand Point, km 26
- Hadleyville-(formerly Oyster Ponds), km 19
- St. Francis Harbour - (formerly Goose Harbour), km 16
- Manassette Lake, km 13
- Port Shoreham, km 6
- Manchester, km 4
- Boylston, km 0

== Parks ==
- Port Shoreham Beach Provincial Park

== History ==
The section of the Collector Highway 344 from Auld's Cove and Mulgrave was designated as Trunk Highway 44.

== See also ==
- List of Nova Scotia provincial highways

== Sources ==
- MapArt (2008). Canada back road atlas / atlas des rangs et chemins. Oshawa, Ontario: MapArt Publishing. ISBN 978-1-55368-614-9.
