= Battle of Chedabucto =

Battle of King William's War

Coordinates: 45°23′12″N 61°30′20″W

- Part of the King William's War
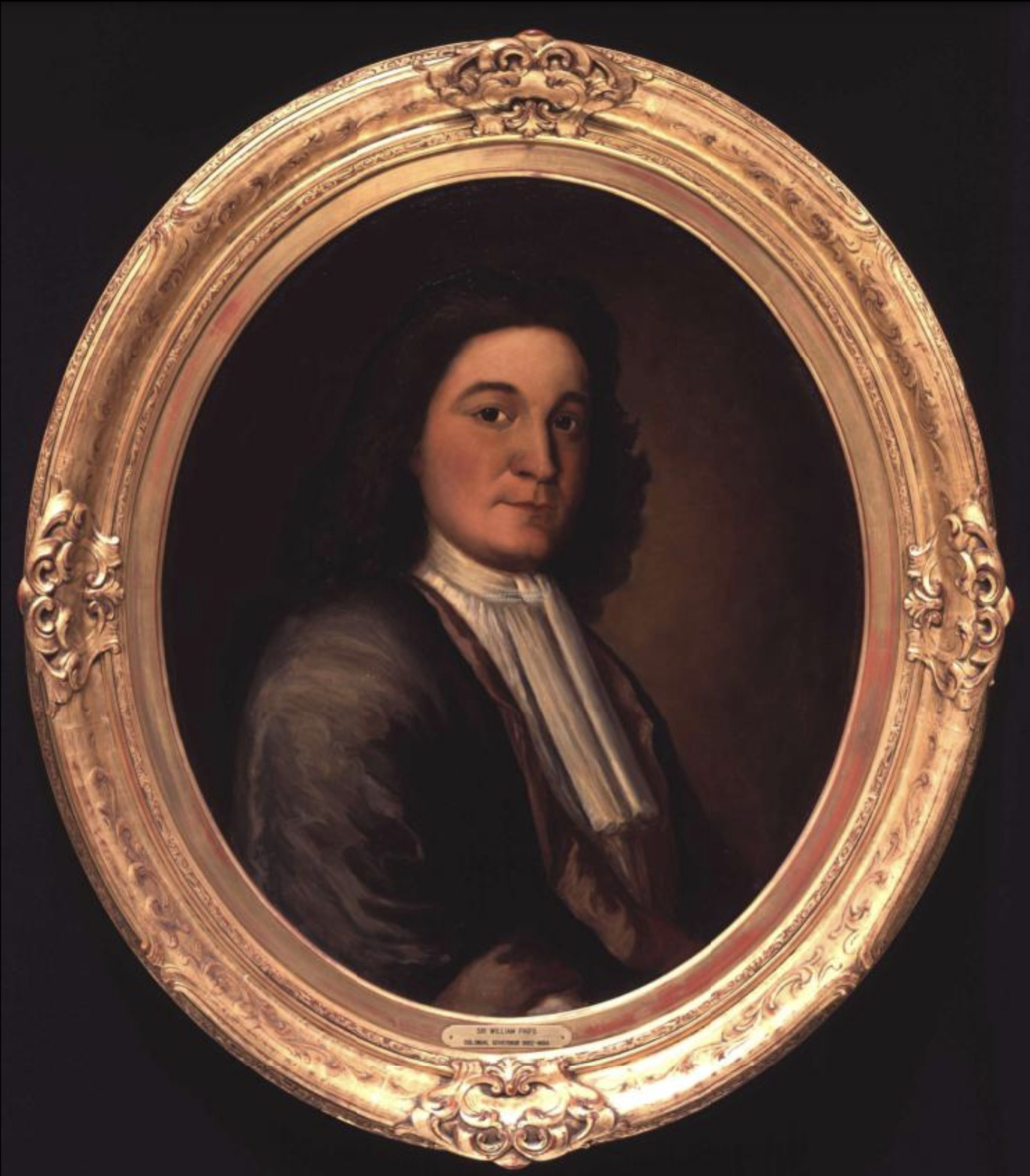
- Portrait of Sir William Phips
Date	3 June 1690
Location	present-day Guysborough, Nova Scotia
Result	English victory

Belligerents
England: Massachusetts Bay	France: Acadia

Commanders and leaders
Sir William Phips; Cyprian Southack; John Alden	Dauphin de Montorgueil

Strength
88 soldiers	25 soldiers

Casualties and losses
2 dead, 6 wounded	Unknown

The Battle of Chedabucto occurred against Fort St. Louis in Chedabucto (present-day Guysborough, Nova Scotia) on June 3, 1690, during King William's War (1689–97). The battle was part of Sir William Phips and New England's military campaign against Acadia. New England sent an overwhelming force to conquer Acadia by capturing the capital Port Royal, Chedabucto, and attacking other villages. The aftermath of these battles was unlike any of the previous military campaigns against Acadia. The violence of the attacks alienated many of the Acadians from the New Englanders, broke their trust, and made it difficult for them to deal amicably with the English-speakers.

== Historical context ==
Clerbaud Bergier led other merchants from La Rochelle, France in enjoying a fishing monopoly in Acadia. In 1682, Fort St. Louis was established by the Company of Acadia (Compagnie de la Peche Sedentaire) to protect the fishery. The principal port was at Chedabucto Bay, which accounted for fifty fishers in 1686. Dauphin de Montorgueil was the commandant at Fort Saint-Louis. Bergier's monopoly was contested by other Acadian merchants, among them Acadian governor Michel Leneuf de la Vallière de Beaubassin, who had been selling fishing licenses to New Englanders.

There were various intentions behind the New England attack on Acadia. Some wanted the expedition to lay the foundation for profitable postwar relations with the Mi'kmaq and Acadians, while others sought only to punish them for their alleged complicity in recent attacks against New England.

== Battle ==
As part of Sir William Phips' expedition to capture the capital of Acadia Port Royal, Phips sent Captain Cyprian Southack to Chedabacto with 80 men to destroy Fort Saint-Louis and the surrounding French fishery. 25 soldiers were stationed at the fort, led by Commandant Montorgueil. The soldiers at Fort Saint-Louis, unlike those at Port Royal, put up a fight before surrendering. Southack landed 50 of his men at Salmon River, near present day Cook's Cove. Southack led his men over land and assaulted the fort, being fired upon by the French cannons as they approached. Southack made an offer for the French to surrender but was refused. Southack led some men around the side of the fort and threw several firebombs over the wall, igniting the power storage. The garrison capitulated on honorable terms and were sent to the French capital of Newfoundland, Plaisance.

Southack reports 2 men killed and 6 wounded during the assault, with no mention of French casualties. After the battle, he spent several days demolishing the fort and destroyed the enormous amount of 50,000 crowns of fish.

== Consequences ==
Phips also dispatched Capt. John Alden (sailor) who raided Cape Sable (present-day south-west Nova Scotia) as well as the villages around the Bay of Fundy, particularly Grand Pre and Chignecto.

France regained control of Port Royal the following year. Joseph Robineau de Villebon, one of Meneval's assistants, returned to Port Royal from France. He reestablished French authority in Port Royal.

The Company of Acadia encountered a variety of difficulties on the way to its final dissolution in 1702. Fort Saint-Louis remained in use at Chedabucto until the community was destroyed in the Squirrel Affair (1718).

== See also ==
- Military history of Nova Scotia

== Sources ==
- Faragher, John Mack (2005). A Great and Noble Scheme: The Tragic Story of the Expulsion of the French Acadians from Their American Homeland. W.W Norton & Company. ISBN 978-0-393-05135-3.
- Dunn, Brenda (2004). A History of Port-Royal-Annapolis Royal, 1605-1800. Nimbus. ISBN 978-1-55109-740-4.
- Griffiths, N.E.S. (2005). From Migrant to Acadian: A North American Border People, 1604-1755. McGill-Queen's University Press. ISBN 978-0-7735-2699-0.
- Haynes, Mark. The Forgotten Battle: A History of the Acadians of Canso/ Chedabuctou. British Columbia: Trafford. 2004
- Basque, Maurice; Mancke, Elizabeth; Reid, John G. (2004). Reid, John G.; Basque, Maurice; Mancke, Elizabeth; et al. (eds.). The "Conquest" of Acadia, 1710: Imperial, Colonial, and Aboriginal Constructions. University of Toronto Press. doi:10.3138/9781442680883. ISBN 978-0-8020-8538-2. JSTOR 10.3138/9781442680883.
- Geoffrey Plank, An Unsettled Conquest. University of Pennsylvania. 2001
- A Journal of The Proceedings In The Late Expedition To Port-Royal, On Board Their Majesties Ship, The Six Friends, The Honourable Sr. William Phipps Knight, Commander In Chief &c. A True Copy, Attested By Joshua Natstock Clerk.
