= Manchester, Nova Scotia =

Community in Nova Scotia, Canada

Coordinates: 45°27′13.06″N 61°28′12.8″W

Manchester in Nova Scotia

Manchester is a rural community in the Canadian province of Nova Scotia, located in the Municipality of the District of Guysborough in Guysborough County.

== Geography ==
Manchester lies along Route 344 on the northern side of Chedabucto Bay. It sits between the communities of Boylston and Port Shoreham.

== History ==
In October 1765, Manchester was part of the 20,000 acres granted to Benjamin Hallowell of Boston for settlement. No significant progress on surveying or settling these lands were made until it passed to his two sons, Benjamin Hallowell Jr., and Ward Nicholas Boylston.

Surveying was completed in 1786, with the Manchester area divided up into 150 acre lots. Settlers were primarily Loyalists from New England, but early settlers also came directly from England, Scotland, and Ireland. At this time, the name Manchester applied to neighboring areas such as present day Boylston, Port Shoreham, and Manassette Lake. This area was collectively known as the Manchester Township. The settlers of Manchester relied on subsistence farming. The road running through the community was known as the "Mulgrave Road" as it went from Boylston to Mulgrave. This road was paved and turned into Route 344 in the late 1960's.
