= Guysborough, Nova Scotia (community) =

Guysborough Baile Mhainisdear (Gaelic)
- Village
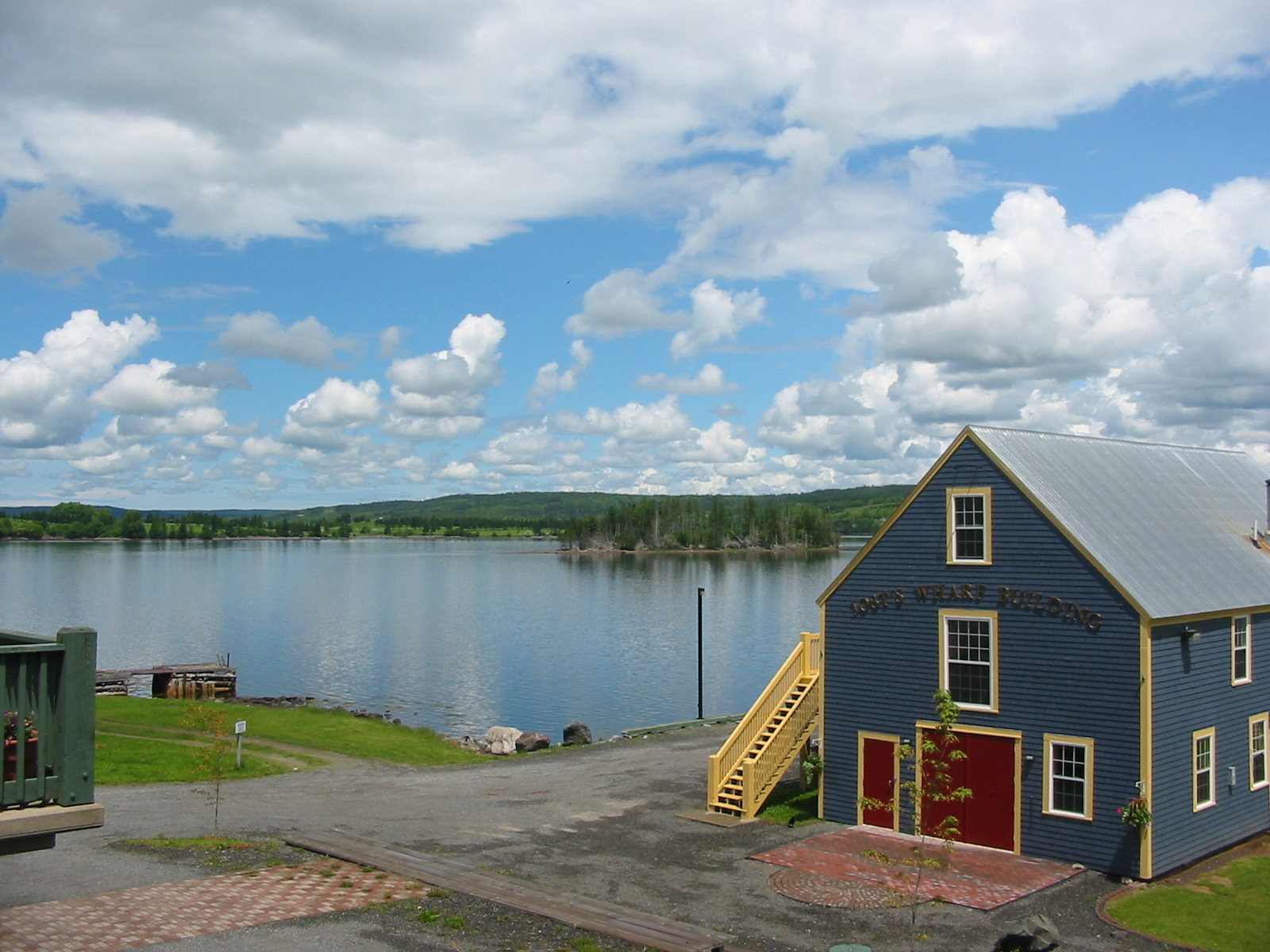
- Guysborough Harbour

- Location within Nova Scotia
- Coordinates: 45°23′30″N 61°30′30″W
- Country: Canada
- Province: Nova Scotia
- County: Guysbrorough County
- Municipality: Municipal District of Guysborough
- First settled: 1634
- Guysborough founded: 1784
- Named after: Sir Guy Carleton

Area
  - Total: 3.09 km^{2} (1.19 sq mi)

Population (2021)
  - Total: 397
  - Density: 128.6/km^{2} (333/sq mi)
- Time zone: UTC-4 (AST)
  - Summer (DST): UTC-3 (ADT)
- Postal code: B0H 1N0
- Area code: 902
- Telephone Exchange: 533
- Total Dwellings: 185
- Median household income, 2000 ($) (all households); Part of a series about Places in Nova Scotia

Guysborough (population: 397) is an unincorporated village in the Canadian province of Nova Scotia, located in Guysborough County.

Located at the head of Chedabucto Bay, fronting Guysborough Harbour, it is the administrative seat of the Guysborough municipal district. The community is named after Sir Guy Carleton (Guy's borough).

The area was first settled by the French in 1634. The Acadian population left the region in the early 1760s and English settlers began arriving shortly afterwards. The current settlement of Guysborough was founded by loyalists in 1784, after the America Revolutionary War.

== History ==
The Mi'kmaq frequented the area, and had a seasonal settlement just south of present-day Guysborough near present-day Cook's Cove.

=== French Settlement - Chedabuctou ===
The site of present-day Guysborough was first occupied by French Europeans in 1634, led by Isaac de Razilly, a French nobleman and Navy officer who later became Governor of French Acadia. He built Fort St François à Canso at the entrance to the harbour, on the peninsula known today as Fort Point. In 1655, Nicolas Denys, governor of the new St Lawrence Bay Province, renamed the area to Chedabuctou and built Fort Chedabuctou at the site of the Razilly's fort to serve as his capital.

In the early 1680s, Clerbaud Bergier, a French Huguenot merchant from La Rochelle, France, led other French merchants in founding the Company of Acadia (Compagnie de la Peche Sedentaire), and established Fort St. Louis to control the regions fishery. Settlers were brought to support the fort and fishery, and the village of Chedabuctou grew next to the fort, as well as farming activity farther inland along the Milford Haven River. A group cleared land and spent the winter of 1682 at Chedabuctou, with the first crops being planted in 1683. By 1687, several families were living at Chedabuctou, as well as soldiers and many seasonal fishermen.

==== Raid on Chedabucto (1688) ====
In August 1688, during King William's War, raiders from New England pillage the fort and fishery. The fort is taken when a soldier opens the gate in the morning and all the others are still asleep, leading to the lone soldier being overwhelmed by the raiders hiding near the gate. The pillaging of the fort is a financial disaster for the company, with several large ships being captured. In the aftermath of this failure, the Company of Acadia is reorganised and a garrison of French Troupes de la Marine are stationed at Fort St. Louis, and the defences are enhanced by a French military engineer.

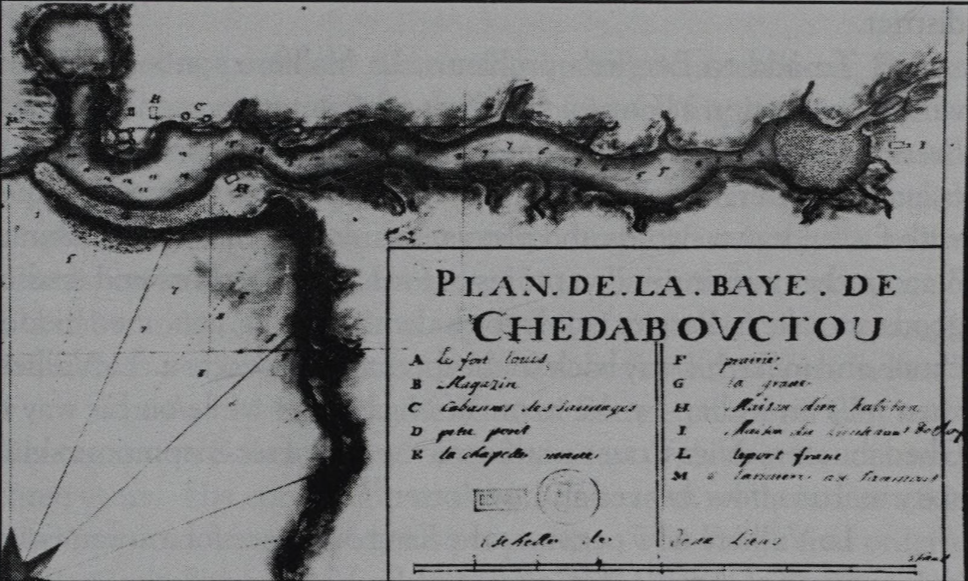
Fort St. Louis and its surroundings, drawn by unknown cartographer in 1686

==== Battle at Chedabucto (1690) ====
Later in King William's War, as part of Sir William Phips's expedition to destroy the capital of Acadia, Port Royal, Phips sent Captain Cyprian Southack to Chedabacto with 80 men to destroy Fort St. Louis and the surrounding French fishery. Southack landed his troops at present day Cook's Cove and proceeded overland to attack the fort. The French garrison of 25 soldiers defended the fort for over six hours, inflicting loses on the New Englanders. Southack led his men close to the fort and used fire bombs to set the fort ablaze, with the French troops surrendering. Southack spent several days demolishing the fort and destroying the enormous amount of 50,000 crowns of fish.

The fort was reopened in 1692 to protect the Acadians of Chedabuctou from further attacks. The Company of Acadia once again reformed and reestablished itself at Chedabuctou in 1697, but encountered a variety of difficulties on the way to its final disappearance in 1702. In 1712, the area was granted to French privateer Bernard Lasonde for services during Queen Anne's War. Lasonde swore allegiance to the British following the Treaty of Utrecht, but also worked against them for the French, who still claimed the Chedabuctou/Canso region. Per a British survey in 1718, there were approximately 300 Acadians living in the area, including both settled families and seasonal fishermen.

==== Raid on Chedacacto (1718) - The Squirrel Affair ====
Shortly after Southack established himself at Shelburne, Nova Scotia, the Mi'kmaq raided the station and burned it to the ground. In response, from 17 to 24 September 1718, Southack led a raid on Canso and Chedabucto in what became known as the Squirrel Affair. Southack first destroyed the fishing village on the Canso Islands. Southack then laid siege for three days to Fort St. Louis, which was defended primarily by the local Acadians. On 18 September, British marines landed across the harbour from the fort on Lasonde's Grave (today McCauls Island) and seized the entrance to Chedabucto Harbour. The following day HMS Squirrel landed troops at Salmon River, who proceeded to the rear of the village. HMS Squirrel made its first attempt to enter the harbour but was beaten back by the Acadian cannon fire from the fort. Later in the day the village was captured by the landed troops. On 20 September HMS Squirrel made a second attempt to enter the harbour, and successfully fired upon the fort. On 23 September, Southack burned the village and loaded the goods onto the French transports that had been captured in the harbour. On 24 September, after pillaging and burning the village, Southack released his Acadian prisoners onto the Canso Islands and sailed back to Boston. Some Acadians fled to Isle Madame after the attack.

The village of Chedabucto recovered after the 1718 attack, but the fort was never reestablished. The Acadian community here sold food and boats to Louisbourg. When the Acadian expulsion began in 1755, Chedabucto became an important stopping point for Acadians fleeing to Isle Royale. The village encountered hard times after the fall of Louisbourg, and the Acadians are recorded to have fully left the region by 1764, at least 70 of whom settled on Saint Pierre and Miquelon.

=== Loyalist Settlement - Guysborough ===
British settlers first arrived in the late 1760s, shortly after the Acadians left the region. They called the area Milfort, and later Milford, referencing the ruined fort near to them.

After the American Revolution, large numbers of Loyalists and soldiers of the disbanded Duke of Cumberland's Regiment and King's Carolina Rangers settled in the area and were given land grants. These Loyalists named their new settlement Guysborough after Sir Guy Carleton, commander of the British forces and Governor General of British North America in the 1780s. Large numbers of Black Loyalists, led by Thomas Brownspriggs, also settled near Guysborough.

In 1790, they built the first Anglican Church in the area and Rev. Peter de la Roche was the first minister. He arrived from Lunenburg after having signed a ransom agreement with American privateers in the Raid on Lunenburg, Nova Scotia (1782).

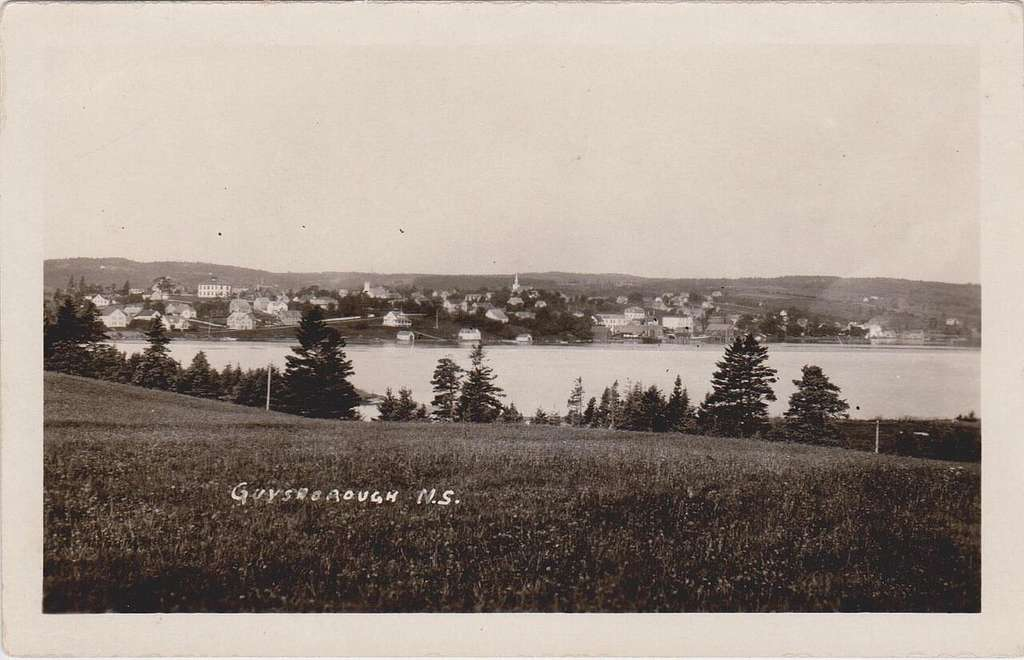
Guysborough from across the harbour, taken circa 1905 by unknown photographer.

A coastal gun battery, known as Manchester Battery and a blockhouse, known as the Guysborough Blockhouse was built on the site of the old French fort to defend the town's harbour by the British during the War of 1812.

The town's fine natural harbour led to its establishment as the administrative centre for the county. The 1800s saw the village grow into a town, and become a major economic hub for the region. Shipbuilding was a major industry until the early 20th century. Following the development of road networks and rail lines, the harbour's importance diminished and the population of the town began to decline.

== Demographics ==
In the 2021 Census of Population conducted by Statistics Canada, Guysborough had a population of 397 living in 166 of its 185 total private dwellings, a change of 9.4% from its 2016 population of 363. With a land area of 3.09 km^{2} (1.19 sq mi), it had a population density of 128.5/km^{2} (332.8/sq mi) in 2021.

== Attractions ==
- The Old Guysborough Court House Museum (c. 1842 to 1843) is a Provincial Heritage Property under the Heritage Property Act. The building also houses Guysborough's visitor information centre.
- The Guysborough Marina is a public area with parking, benches, seasonal food stalls, and two buildings. The Marina building contains an art gallery and the marina office, while the Jost building contains a cafe and pub. A market is held every Saturday during the summer.
- The Shoreline Trail extends from the end of Main Street to Fort Point along the waterfront. Interpretive panels regarding Guysborough's history are located along the path.
- The former residence of Supreme Court of Nova Scotia Justice W.F. DesBarres. The justice was the grandson of Joseph Frederick Wallet DesBarres who was an army officer, military engineer, surveyor, colonizer and colonial administrator who created an important 4-volume atlas of nautical charts for the coastline of eastern North America called the Atlantic Neptune. The residence was renovated into the DesBarres Manor Inn in 2003. Several maps from the Atlantic Neptune hang in the inn.

== Legacy ==
- Namesake of HMCS Chedabucto (J168)
- Subject of Stan Rogers' song "Guysborough Train"
