= David Mathews =

American lawyer and politician

44th Mayor of New York City
- In office 1776–1783
- Preceded by: Whitehead Hicks
- Succeeded by: James Duane

Personal details
- Born: c. 1739 New York, British America
- Died: July 28, 1800 (aged 60-61) Sydney, Nova Scotia
- Spouse: Sarah Seymour (m. 1758)
- Education: Princeton University (AM)

David Mathews (c. 1739 – July 28, 1800) was an American born British lawyer and politician from New York City. He was a Loyalist during the American Revolutionary War and was the 44th and last Colonial Mayor of New York City from 1776 until 1783. As New York City was the center of British control of the Colonies during the war, he was one of the highest ranking civilian authorities in the Colonies during this period. He was accused of supporting a plan led by Thomas Hickey to kill the Revolutionary General George Washington. He resettled in Nova Scotia after the war, and became a leading political figure in the Cape Breton colony that was created in 1786.

== Early life and education ==
Mathews was born in New York to Vincent Mathews and Catalina Abeel, the daughter of Johannes Abeel, the second Mayor of Albany and Catherine Schuyler. He earned a Master of Arts degree from the College of New Jersey (now Princeton University) in 1754. He was admitted to practice law in Orange County, New York in 1760, and was the County Clerk of Orange County from 1762 through 1778.

== Career ==
Mathews was in 1770 one of the founders of the Moot Club, a forum for legal discussion, whose members consisted of William Livingston, James Duane, Gouverneur Morris, Stephen DeLancey, John Jay, Egbert Benson, and Robert R. Livingston. John Jay would later be one of the signatories of Mathews' arrest warrant in 1776.

He was appointed Mayor in February 1776 by William Tryon, Governor of the Province of New York, replacing Whitehead Hicks.

Mathews lived in Manhattan but maintained a summer residence in Flatbush, located approximately at the intersection of Flatbush Avenue and Parkside Avenue, and where he conducted much of his business while Mayor.

=== Alleged plot to kill George Washington ===
Mathews, in 1776, was implicated in a plan to kidnap George Washington, the Commander in Chief of the Continental Army. Mathews and William Tryon, the governor of the Province of New York, were also accused of being involved, as was a member of Washington's Life Guard, Thomas Hickey, who would eventually be executed for his role.

After John Jay interviewed many witnesses regarding the payments made by the British to recruits, he as head of the Committee of Conspiracies of the New York Provincial Congress, and after consultation and approval by Washington, ordered Mathews' arrest for "being engaged in a Conspiracy against the Authority of the Congress and the Liberties of America." Mathews was arrested at his Flatbush home on June 22, 1776 by Lieutenant Colonel Ezekiel Cornell. On July 8, the New York Provincial Congress, after Mathews was found guilty of treason and subversion, was sentenced to death and was to be executed on August 25.

He was first sent to Hartford, Connecticut under the care of Abraham DePeyser, and then sent to Litchfield, Connecticut on July 21 and placed under house arrest in the home of Major Moses Seymour, whose orders were as follows:

you are directed and required to take him under your Care and him safely convey from Hartford in Hartford county to Litchfield ___ aforesaid and him there hold and keep in safe Custody permitting him only to walk abroad for the Benefit of the Air in the Day Time and to attend Divine Service at some place of public worship and that under your law or that of some other trusty keeper on the Sabbath Day, until you secure further Orders from me or from the Provincial Convention of the State of New York.

Mathews, in a letter to a college classmate written during his imprisonment, denied his involvement in the plot against Washington:

I have made so many fruitless applications lately that I am almost discouraged putting pen to paper again. [It] ... is verily believed throughout this Colony, that I was concerned in a Plot to assassinate George Washington and blow up the Magazine in New York? The Convention well knows such a report prevails. They also know it is false as hell is false.

The charges were never proven. Mathews, in his claim for compensation to the Royal Commission in London for the forfeiture of his estate in the colonies, had it written that "He had formed a plan for the taking of Mr. Washington and his guard prisoners, which was not effected by an unforeseen discovery that was made."

Mathews later took advantage of a greater level of freedom from a minor parole to meet with other Loyalists, including Joel Stone, who helped Mathews escape.

On November 27, Major Seymour placed the following notice in the Connecticut Journal seeking help in recapturing Matthews for the reward of $50 ($1,568.98 as of 2021). The notice read as follows:

FIFTY DOLLARS reward

On the night after the 20th instant escaped from Litchfield David Mathews Esq., late Mayor of the City of New York, who was some months since taken from hence, on being charged with high crimes against the American States, but on giving his parole was admitted to certain limits, which he has most basely and perfidiously deserted. He is well made, about 6 feet high, short brown hair, about 39 years old, and has a very plausible way of deceiving people. It is supposed he will endeavor to get to Long Island, where his family now resides. Whoever shall take him up and return him to the subscriber in Litchfield, shall receive the above reward and necessary charges...

=== New York under British control ===
Mathews subsequently resumed his office as mayor in late 1776, returning on December 2, during which time New York was firmly in British control. His house was located on Water Street.

General Howe, in late 1776, awarded Mathews all of the profits from the city's ferries, markets and slips, for his own personal use. Previously these funds were reverted to the corporation of the City of New York

Mathews was also given command of two military units, the Loyal Volunteers of the City of New York and the Mayor's Independent Company of Volunteers, and was often referred to as Colonel.

In 1778, a party of twenty men "with their faces blacked and otherwise disguised" led by Captain John Schenck went to Flatbush as part of the Whaleboat War in a failed attempt to capture Mathews. They instead took away Major James Moncrief.

In August 1778 Mathews sustained injuries in assisting British troops and Manhattan residents in extinguishing a fire on what is now Front Street along the East River.

In June 1779 an attempt by Loyalists to kidnap New Jersey Governor William Livingston, a distant Schuyler cousin of Mathews, failed. Mathews was suspected to have organized this plot.

The New York Assembly, on October 22, 1779, in an Act of Attainder, declared Mathews to be one of 59 state felons who was to be executed if found in the state. His property, which totaled nearly 27,000 acres, was confiscated. In his father Vincent Mathews' will, he was not mentioned and only his children were listed as inheritors.

It is likely that Mathews was at least complicit in the handling of colonial military prisoners, who were not considered Prisoners of War until months after the British defeat at the Battle of Yorktown. Over 10,000 colonial soldiers died as prisoners during the American Revolutionary War, most of them in New York and on prison ships in the East River, more than the men who died in combat.

Mathews is on record as a visitor to American prisoners of war and helped to produce affidavits denying allegations of abuse and neglect from half a dozen British officials testifying that American prisoners were well-fed and comfortable.

Mathews' character was considered questionable not just by Patriots but by fellow Loyalists as well. Former Chief Justice of the Province of New York and fellow Loyalist William Smith wrote that Mathews "sends out Parties to the Country to plunder & he has a Share of it," even alleging that he had clearly lied about magnanimously sending stolen goods on the Poor House. Smith then contemplated that "If these Charges are true this Man must dread the restoration of the Peace of his Country & the Re Establishment of order." Thomas Jones described Mathews as "a person low in estimation as a lawyer, profligate, abandoned, and dissipated, indigent, extravagant, and voluptuous as himself." Peter Dubois, fellow magistrate of Mathews, spoke of him as a "profligate and villain" who took advantage of his status and position by taking possession of stolen household goods and even goods that were destined for people in poorhouses.

=== Arrival in Nova Scotia ===
It is unknown when Mathews and his family left New York; there is a record of his presence in England in 1784. In November 1784 Mathews arrived in Halifax, Nova Scotia. Failing to gain an appointment as that province's attorney general, he traveled to Cape Breton Island, which in 1786 was administered as a separate colony. There he was appointed Attorney General and a member of the Executive Council by Lieutenant Governor Joseph Frederick Wallet DesBarres.

Although an elected house of assembly was to have been established, this did not occur, and Mathews became a leading and divisive figure in the small colony's politics. He had a difficult relationship with both DesBarres and his successor, William Macarmick, who eventually left the colony in 1795, leaving Mathews, as senior counselor, as interim administrator of the colony. Mathews then packed its government with friends and business associates. When he was succeeded as administrator by John Murray, the latter dismissed him from the post of attorney general. Mathews made common cause with the Duke of Kent, who had a personal dislike of Murray, and engineered Murray's replacement.

While living in Nova Scotia the Mi'kmaq native peoples would periodically use his home to live in during leaner times; discouraging or rebuffing these requests ran the risk of inciting conflict.

== Death ==
Mathews died on July 28, 1800, and was buried in Sydney. His funeral was well attended. A letter to the editor of the Halifax Journal noted that "if he had any foibles ... they were the offspring of a openness of manners and a liberal unsuspecting disposition."

== Personal life ==
Mathews married Sarah Seymour on November 6, 1758, in Trinity Church in New York.

Some of Mathews' nine children married Americans and moved to the United States, such as his daughter Harriet Mathews, whose daughter Anna Winslow Green married the namesake son of Harvard University president Samuel Webber. Some of Mathews' offspring remained in Canada, such as his eldest daughter Catalina, who married a lieutenant in the 35th (Royal Sussex) Regiment of Foot and subsequently moved to Rye, East Sussex England, where she bore children. Mathews' granddaughter married Vice Admiral James Noble, who served on HMS Agamemnon with Lord Nelson. Catalina Mathews' descendants include solicitor and editor Horace Pym and British historian Keith Kissack and can be found in England, Canada, United States, Australia and New Zealand.

Descendants of Mathews have served in both Canadian and United States politics and government in both local and national capacities. In Canada Murray Dodd, represented Cape Breton in the House of Commons of Canada from 1882 to 1887 and was named Queen's Counsel in 1880. Also Lewis Wilkieson Johnstone (1862–1936), who was also a grandson of Edmund Murray Dodd, was a Conservative member of the House of Commons of Canada representing Cape Breton North—Victoria from 1925 to 1935.

In the United States collateral descendants of Mathews include Fletcher Mathews Haight (1799–1856), a federal judge in California, who was a great nephew of Mathews and grandson of his brother James. His son Henry Huntly Haight was the 10th Governor of California.

Mathews's brother, Fletcher Mathews, was ordered arrested by George Washington around the same time in June 1776 for suspicion of a "Scheme of Inlisting Men for the Kings Service". No evidence was found, and he was subsequently released. Fletcher was referred to in 1779 by Col. Isaac Nicholl, Sheriff to Governor George Clinton, as "an exceedingly bad man" who was "willing to do all the hurt he can" to the Patriot cause. In 1781 Washington wrote to Clinton warning him about Loyalists seeking to kidnap him. Washington specifically mentions the home of Fletcher as a frequent meeting place for Crown sympathizers. At the end of the war, unlike David, Fletcher was permitted to stay in the country due to his childhood relationship to Governor Clinton, to his wife Sarah Woodhull being the sister of General Nathaniel Woodhull who died in 1776 from wounds resulting from his capture by the British, and Sheriff Nicholl being another brother-in-law.

Another of Mathews' brothers, James, of Cornwall, was arrested at the same time as he and Fletcher Mathews. He was released upon "taking the oath" to the patriot effort. James was the father of Vincent Mathews.

Cornplanter, a first cousin once removed of Mathews and a Seneca chief, also supported the British against the colonists.

== Legacy ==
The Mathews estate was located at what is now Petersfield Provincial Park in Westmount, Nova Scotia.

A New York City playground located in the Bronx, operated by the New York City Department of Parks and Recreation called the Mathews Muliner Playground, is in part named after David Mathews. Part of the inscription related to Mathews says, in part, that "... the British-born Mathews was installed as the Loyalist mayor. Mathews was known as a thief, an embezzler, and a spendthrift."

== Other sources ==
- Morgan, R. J. (1979). "Mathews, David". In Halpenny, Francess G. (ed.). Dictionary of Canadian Biography. Vol. IV (1771–1800) (online ed.). University of Toronto Press.
- Van Doren, Carl. Secret History of the American Revolution. New York: Viking Press, 1941.

Political offices
Preceded by Whitehead Hicks	Mayor of New York City; 1776—1783	Succeeded by James Duane
New office Acting in absence of Lt. Gov. Macarmick	Administrator of Cape Breton Island; 1795-1798; Served under: William Macarmick	Succeeded by James Ogilvie
