= Hadleyville =

Hadleyville may refer to:

- Hadleyville, Nova Scotia, Canada
- Hadleyville, Wisconsin, United States
- Hadleyville, the setting of the 1952 film High Noon
- Hadleyville, the setting of the 1986 tv series Gung Ho
