= Richard Gibbons =

Richard Gibbons may refer to:

- Richard Gibbons (Jesuit)
- Richard Gibbons (jurist)
