= St. Francis Harbour, Nova Scotia =

Community in Nova Scotia, Canada

Coordinates: 45°26′58.32″N 61°18′38.08″W

St. Francis Harbour in Nova Scotia

St. Francis Harbour, is a small community in the Canadian province of Nova Scotia, located in the Municipality of the District of Guysborough in Guysborough County.

== Geography ==
Port Shoreham lies along Route 344 on the northern shore of Chedabucto Bay.

Goose Harbour River runs through the community into the harbour, and out into the bay.

== History ==
The original name for the settlement was Goose Harbour. Settlers first arrived in the early 19th century. The name of the settlement was changed through an act of legislature in 1871 to St. Francis Harbour. A Roman Catholic chapel was built in the 1870's. Subsistence farming and fishing were the primary economic activities. The population in 1956 was 170.

== Amenities ==
There is a municipal recreation area with a public outhouse, picnic tables, an outdoor gym, and two tennis courts.
