= William Macarmick =

Canadian politician

General William Macarmick
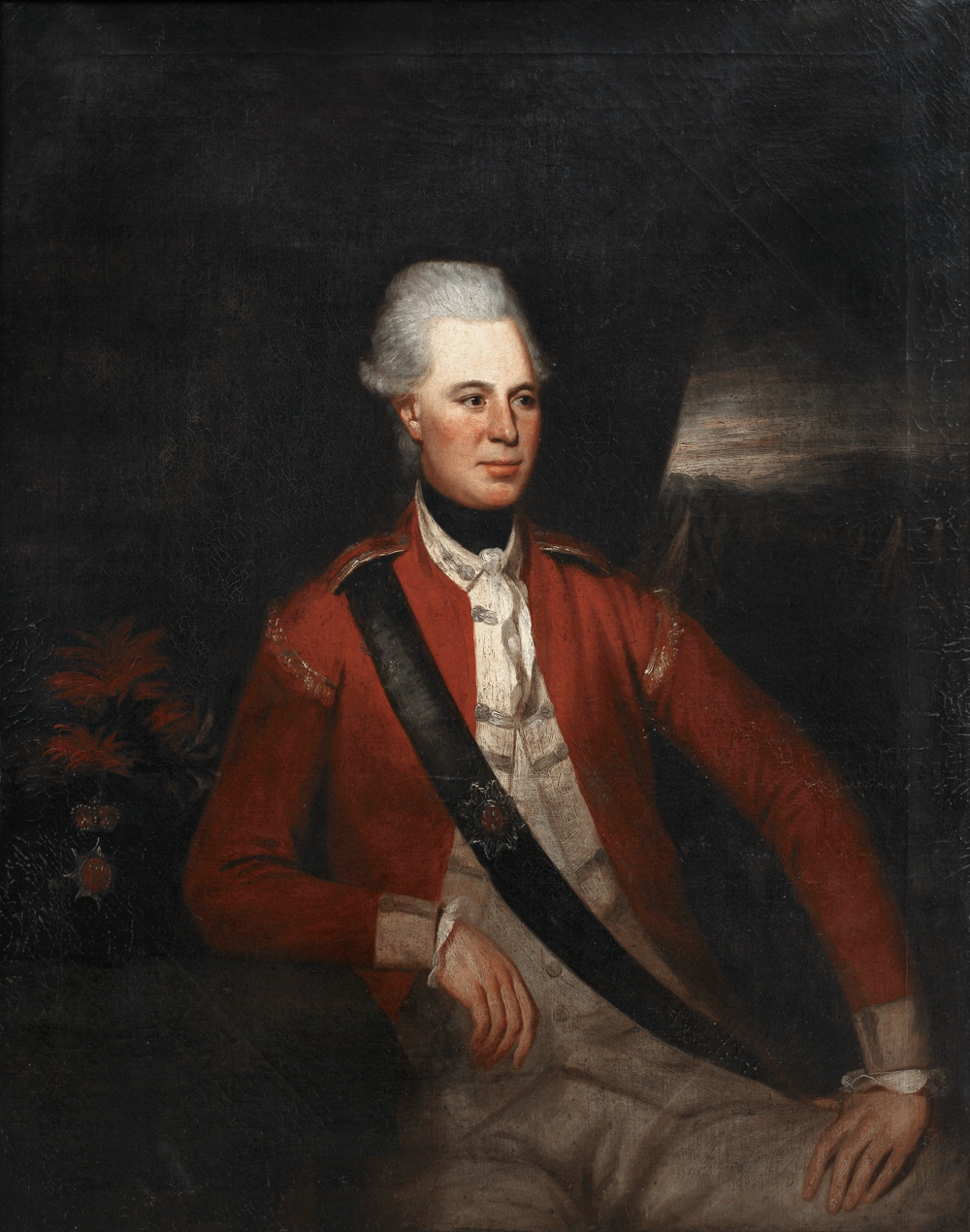
- Portrait by George Keith Ralph, 1780
- Born: 1742 Truro, Cornwall, England
- Died: 20 August 1815 (aged 72–73) West Looe, Cornwall, England

William Macarmick (baptised 15 September 1742 – 20 August 1815) was Lieutenant-Governor of Cape Breton and an MP.

== Early life and military service ==
Macarmick was born in Truro, Cornwall, Great Britain, into a family active in local politics in business. His father James was a wine merchant and served as the local mayor. Macarmick was educated at the Truro Grammar School, and followed his father into both the wine business and politics, winning the mayoral office of Truro in 1770.

Before his political career began however, Macarmick served in the British Army. Acquiring a lieutenant's commission in the 75th Regiment of Foot in 1759, he was in 1764 promoted to captain in the 46th Foot before being placed on half pay. When the American Revolutionary War broke out, Macarmick at his own expense recruited and established the 93rd Regiment of Foot, winning appointment as its colonel in February 1780.

== Political career ==
Following the American war Macarmick became involved in national politics. In 1784 he won election to Parliament representing Truro, a post he held until he was appointed lieutenant governor of Cape Breton Island in 1787. In 1787 he introduced to the Truro School a medal that was awarded annually to students who excelled in oration.

When the British took control of Cape Breton after the Seven Years' War, attention was focused on the working of the mines on a commercial basis, which were thought to provide an inexhaustible source of revenue. Due to these commercial possibilities, in 1784 the island was separated politically from neighbouring Nova Scotia. In its first few years the colonial leadership was beset by political squabbles under Lieutenant Governor J. F. W. DesBarres, and Macarmick was instructed to end the factionalism. He was able to do so, but only by alienating all of the major political actors against him. In 1788 he dismissed the colony's chief justice Richard Gibbons, for attempting to form a militia. Macarmick requested leave to return to England in 1794, after financial perquisites from the province's extensive coal fields were withdrawn. He left the province in 1795, but retained the post of lieutenant governor until his death in 1815. In his absence the province was governed by a succession of colonial administrators.

Despite his half-pay status in the military he continued to be promoted, rising to lieutenant general in 1803 and full general in 1813. He died at West Looe, Cornwall, on 20 August 1815.

Political offices
Preceded by Joseph Frederick Wallet DesBarres	Lieutenant Governor of Cape Breton Island; 1787-1815 with David Mathews (1795-1798); James Ogilvie (1798-1799); John Murray (1799-1801); John Despard (1800-1807); Nicholas Nepean (1807-1812); Hugh Swayne (1813-1816)	Succeeded by George Robert Ainslie
