= Nicholas Nepean =

- Born: 1757; Saltash
- Died: 18 December 1823 (aged 65–66); Newton Abbot
- Relatives: Sir Evan Nepean (Brother)
- Military career
- Allegiance: United Kingdom
- Branch: Marines; British Army
- Service years: 1776–1823
- Rank: Lieutenant-General
- Commands: Banffshire Fencibles; Lieutenant-Governor of Cape Breton Island; Commander-in-Chief Cape Breton
- Conflicts: French Revolutionary Wars; Napoleonic Wars

Nicholas Nepean (1757 – 18 December 1823) was a British Army officer and colonial official in Nova Scotia in the early 19th century.

Born in Saltash, Cornwall, in 1757, he joined the Royal Marines in 1776 Nepean served with the British Army after 1789 with the New South Wales Corps and then with the 93rd Regiment in 1794 where he was deployed to Ireland (1795–96), Gibraltar (1802–03) and Canada (1807-1812).

Nepean was appointed acting civil administrator of Cape Breton Island in 1807 to replace the unpopular John Despard, in what was his only major non-military appointment. He and Depard were a line of acting administrators as William Macarmick had left the colony since 1794 but remained in title only until 1815. After his time in Cape Breton, Nepean remained in the army until retiring as Lieutenant general in 1814 and returned to England and died at Newton Abbot in 1823.

Nepean's other claims to fame were being brother of Sir Evan Nepean and in the dismissal of an equally mediocre official Sir William Campbell as Attorney General and Executive Councilor. Campbell appealed his dismissal and later became Chief Justice of Upper Canada.

Political offices
Preceded by John Despard	Acting Administrator of Cape Breton Island; 1807-1812; Served under: William Macarmick	Succeeded by Hugh Swayne
