= Henry Despard =

Henry Despard CB
- Born: October 1783; Laurel Hill, Mountrath, Queens County, Ireland
- Died: 30 April 1859 (aged 75); Baring Crescent, Heavitree, Devon, England
- Spouse: Anne Rushworth (m. 1824)
- Relatives: Edward Despard (uncle); Catherine Despard (aunt); John Despard (uncle)
- Military career
- Allegiance: United Kingdom of Great Britain and Ireland
- Branch: British Army
- Service years: 1799–1854
- Rank: Major General
- Units: 17th Regiment, 1799– Staff of Ireland, Southern District, 1838– 99th Regiment, 1842–1854
- Commands: New Zealand, 1845–1846; Van Dieman's Land, 1853–1854
- Campaigns: India; Unnamed forts; Chumeer, 1807; Gunourie, 1807; Pindaree, 1813; Third Anglo-Maratha War; Jubbulpore, 1817; New Zealand Wars; Flagstaff War; Ōhaeawai, 1845; Ruapekapeka, 1846
- Awards: Companion of the Order of the Bath, 1846

Major General Henry Despard CB (October 1783 – 30 April 1859) was a British Army officer of the 17th Regiment of Foot (1799–1838), Staff of Ireland (1838–1842) and 99th Regiment of Foot (1842–1854). He saw action in Third Anglo-Maratha War in India and, in his later years, in the Flagstaff, or Northern, War in New Zealand. In 1845 he commanded British troops in a disastrous assault on the Māori pā at Ōhaeawai.

== Early life ==
Henry Despard, born October 1783 at Laurel Hill, Mountrath, Queens County, Ireland, was the son of Captain Phillip Despard and Letitia Croasdaile. Phillip, an officer of the 7th Regiment of Foot, was one of five brothers from a prominent Anglo-Irish family of Huguenot descent who served in the British military. The eldest brother, John Despard (1745–1829), rose to the rank of full General, while another, Colonel Edward Despard gained notoriety as a United Irishman and republican agitator executed in London for treason in 1803.

== Career ==
Henry Despard was commissioned as Ensign in the 17th (Leicestershire) Regiment of Foot on 25 October or 18 November 1799. He served in the Mediterranean from August 1802 to 1804, then sailed with the 17th Regiment, which embarked from the Isle of Wight, for the East Indies in July 1804.

=== India ===
The 17th Regiment arrived at Fort William, Calcutta, in December 1804. Augmented to 1260 officers and soldiers, they moved on in boats via Allahabad to Cawnpore in September 1805.

==== Chumeer ====
On 20 December 1806 two 17th Regiment companies under Lieutenant Colonel George William Hawkins marched out to reduce several forts of insurgent chiefs in the mountainous region of Bundelkand, which the Maratha had resigned to the British in 1804. Captain Despard took part in taking three forts, which put up little resistance. The siege of the strong fort of Chumeer / Chumar, near Konch, led by Lieutenant Colonel Richard Stovin, proved to be an exception. Here, Despard distinguished himself in the siege and storming of it, suffering a contusion in ascending the breach, with Lieutenant Peter McGregor killed fighting in it. Chumeer was captured at 4:00 pm on 29 January 1807. Hawkins mentioned Despard in despatches.

==== Gunourie ====
Dunde Khan had been appreciated for his neutrality during the war with Holkar and Scindia. However, having been unable to pay a tribute due to the British, been offended by a judge and magistrate's cultural insensitivity, executed the low caste messenger who'd served him with a subpœna, and declined appearance at a civil tribunal as his government was not subject to British civil jurisprudence, a military force under Major General Richard Mark Dickens, 34th Regiment, was sent out to his small mud-fort at Comona (modern Kamona, Bulandshahr, Uttar Pradesh). Dunde Khán had the fort's defences prepared. Frederic Growse wrote: "in 1807, Dunde Khán, with his eldest son, Ran-mast Khán, held the fort for three months, though the garrison consisted of a mere handful of men." On 18–19 November 1807, four 17th Regiment companies and some Sepoy companies made their assault. "They were called off from this murderous scene—not without difficulty." The British casualties were 35 officers killed and wounded and 700 men.

Dunde Khan and his garrison abandoned Comona for the fort at Gunourie (modern Ginauri, to the north of Shikarpur, Bulandshahr), upon which British forces began their approaches on 24 November. Despard took part in the siege but, the fort providing its garrison with little refuge from the shelling, Dunde Khan eventually abandoned Gunourie and escaped at about 7:00 pm on 10 December, across the river Jumna. The troops returned to Muttra.

==== Sikh campaign ====
In November 1808, Despard with his regiment joined Major General St Leger's reserve force proceeding to the river Sutlej to territorially maintain Ranjit Singh's activity and the Sikh empire to the north of it. As little of interest was encountered, the 17th returned to Muttra in early May 1809 where it was reinforced with a detachment from England. In November, the 17th Regiment moved to Meerut for the next few years.

==== Pindaree marauders ====
The 17th Regiment marched to Ghazeepore from November 1812 to January 1813. In April, Captain Despard marched four companies to Secrole, Benares and Mirzapore, to observe and intercept bands of Pindaree marauders in British territory, then returned in June.

==== Third Anglo-Maratha war ====
In October 1817, 17th Regiment companies formed part of Brigadier General Frederick Hardyman's brigade ordered to march on Nagpore where British troops were surrounded. Captain Despard acted as Hardyman's Brigade Major. On 19 December they encountered enemy in battle order before Jubbulpore and attacked with the 8th Regiment of Native Cavalry capturing the guns in a charge and the 17th driving off the Arab infantry by bayonet causing them severe casualty. The 17th lost a few men, along with Lieutenants Maw and Nicholson wounded. The brigade continued on to Nagpore, but when waiting a few days at Lucknadoon for the elephants bringing up provisions, news arrived that the British troops at Nagpore had defeated the Arab forces—Battle of Sitabuldi. The 17th returned to Ghazeepore. Hardyman mentioned Despard in his despatch for the battle at Jubblepore.

The regiment was stationed at Berhampore from 8 January 1821 to August 1822, where Despard, Brevet Major since 12 August 1819, advanced to Major by purchase on 22 April 1822. His service in India ended in July.

=== Home and abroad ===
Back in England he married Anne Rushworth, fourth daughter of Edward and Catherine Rushworth of Farringdon Hill, Isle of Wight, at St Luke's Church, Chelsea, on 1 June 1824. Between 1825 and 1830 they had five children of which two died in infancy.

He advanced to rank of Lieutenant Colonel through purchase on 13 August 1829. From 1830 the 17th Regiment began embarking in detachments for New South Wales, via Van Dieman's Land, to occupy various stations there. They returned to India in March 1836 and after landing at Bombay, moved on to Poona, then to a nearby camp in 1837.

Lieutenant Colonel Despard joined the Staff of Ireland, Southern District, headquartered in Cork, as Inspecting Field Officer on 22 January 1838, a position which he exchanged with Colonel Sir John Gaspard Le Marchant in September 1842 for command of the 99th (Lanarkshire) Regiment of Foot, which stationed at Athlone, was destined for Van Dieman's Land and New South Wales with new colours.

=== Australia and New Zealand ===
The 99th arrived in Australia in detachments with successive shipments of convicts from early 1842. The Despards arrived at Hobart, Van Dieman's Land, on the Gilmore on 19 August 1843 with an officer, 50 soldiers of the 99th, and 249 male convicts and moved on to Sydney, New South Wales, in late September. In Sydney Despard made himself unpopular by refusing to attend a ball thrown in his honour. He also refused to adopt modern drill methods, insisting on maintaining old-fashioned techniques, which reportedly caused chaos on the parade ground.

==== The Flagstaff War ====
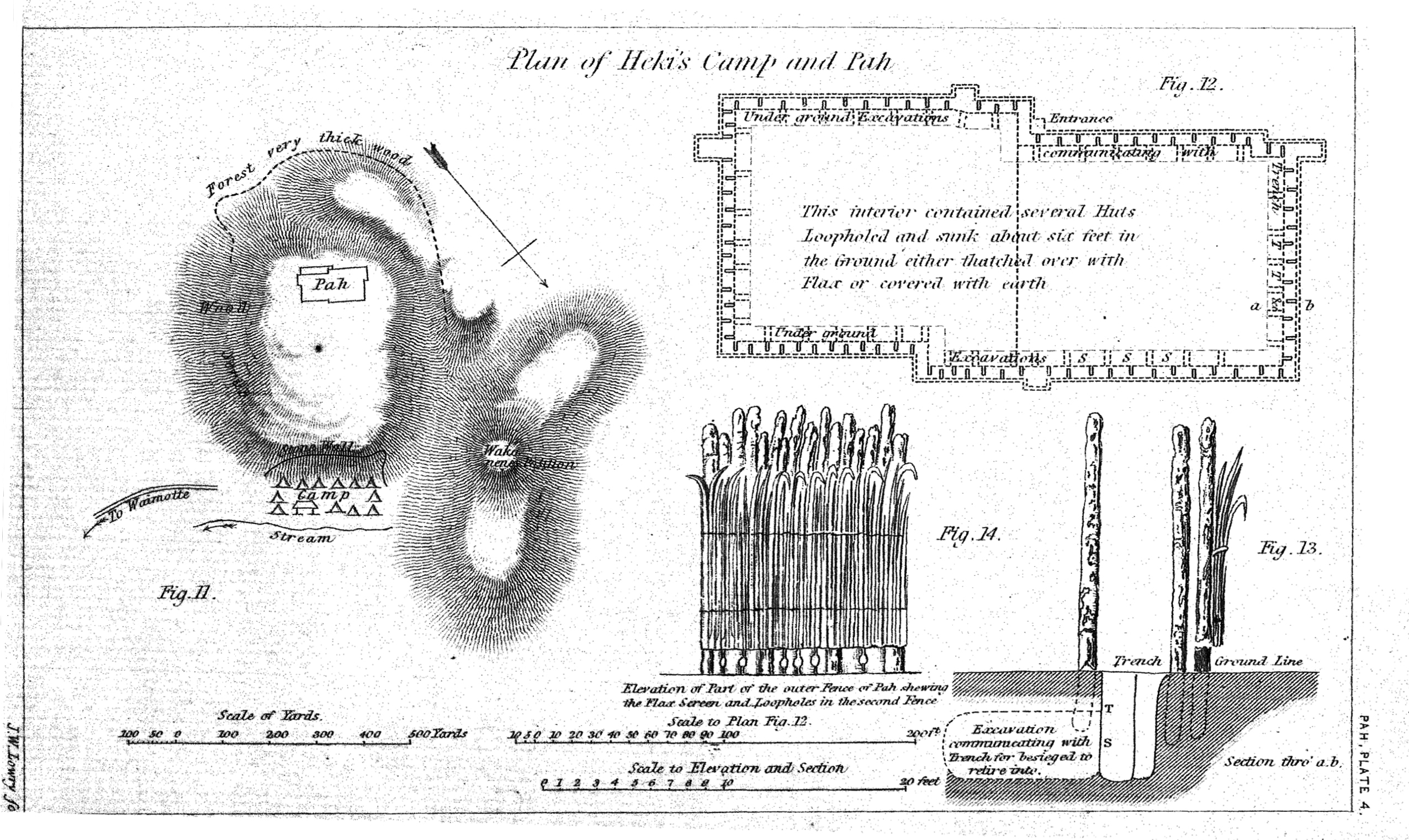
Plan of Heke's Camp and Pah, Ōhaeawai, 1845

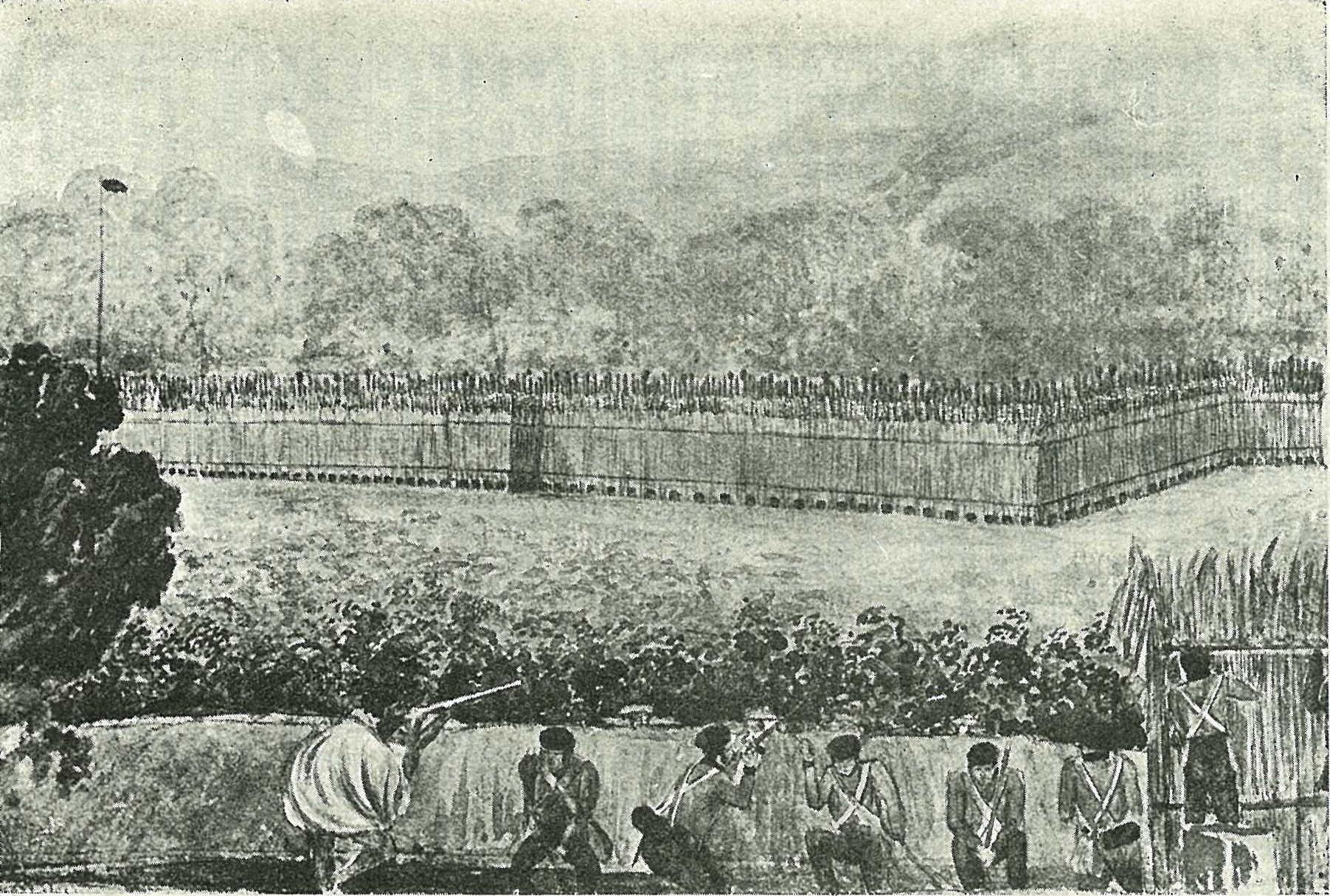
View of the left angle of Heke's pah at Ohaiawai that was stormed on the 1st July, 1845. Artist: Cyprian Bridge, Major, 58th Regiment

In response to Hōne Heke's intentions, Despard and the headquarters of his regiment arrived in Auckland on barque British Sovereign on 2 June 1845, to take command of the troops in New Zealand and conclude what has been variously called Heke's War, the Northern War, Hōne Heke's Rebellion and the Flagstaff War. Confident in his command of 600 men, the largest British force yet seen in New Zealand, when Tāmati Wāka Nene was introduced to him to offer services, he bluntly replied: "When I want the help of savages I will ask for it." Captain Thomas Bernard Collinson, RE, later remarked on that matter:

Colonel Despard does not speak highly of the assistance he received from the native allies under Tomati-waka. They acted as guides, and gave information and advice about the country, and carried things on the march (for which they took care to get well paid): but they acted entirely in accordance with their own tactics: long talking, exciting preparations, sudden spurts, daring skirmishes for a little, and then talk again for a week. They desired to be friendly to the British: it was not to be expected that they should take a prominent part in a quarrel they had not much personal concern in—and for strangers against their countrymen. Colonel Despard's recommendation, "to be able to act independently of the natives" is worthy to be remembered by all officers.

On 24 June his troops were repulsed in their storming of Ōhaeawai, said to be the first Māori pā designed to resist artillery fire. British casualties amounted to some 41 killed and 70 wounded, "nearly one-third of the force actually engaged." Despard attributed the main cause of the assault's failure to the abandonment, in the ravine, of hatchets, axes, ladders and ropes for putting down the stockade, by those appointed to carry them. He'd also noted:

The original intention was to have had a false attack made on the left face of the pah, at the same moment with the real one; but the unavoidable necessity of occupying the hill, which had been attacked in the morning, with a strong force, reduced my numbers so much that I had not a sufficient force to venture it.

The troops returned to their camp, undaunted either in mind and spirit, only regretting that the obstacles opposed to them were too strong to be overcome, and even in the moment of repulse wishing that another opportunity of attack might be offered them.

Officers, troops, contemporary newspaper reporters and later historians attributed the carnage to Despard's incompetence; to an "ill-tempered" decision to order a storming of the unbreeched palisades. After countermanding his own order to retreat, Despard resumed a bombardment. Early on 11 July, the pā was found to be empty and after destroying it, Despard's force retired to Waimate.

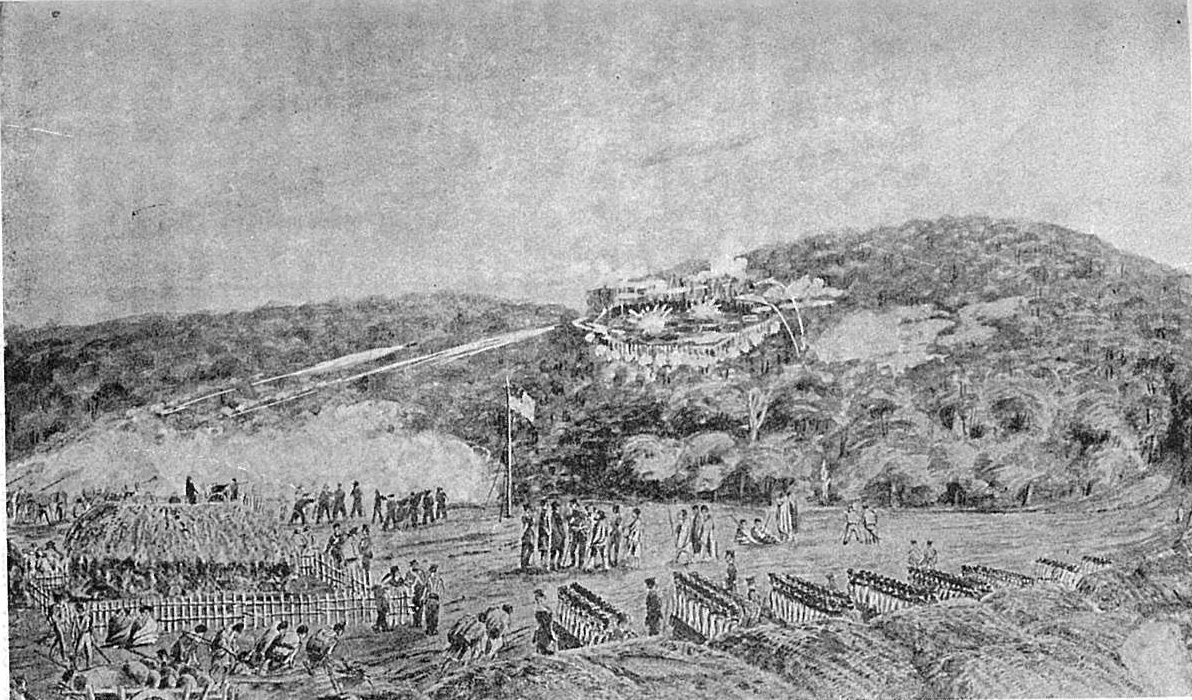
The bombardment of Ruapekapeka Pā. Artist: Cyprian Bridge, Major, 58th Regiment

Following inconclusive peace negotiations, in November 1845 a new governor, George Grey, ordered Despard to begin operations against the formidable pā at Ruapekapeka. With a force of around thirteen hundred British troops and several hundred Māori allies from whom he was now ready to take advice, in January 1846 Despard prevailed. Despard claimed that Ruapekapeka Pā had been taken by assault, an account not backed by those under his command who reported that the Māori defenders had staged an orderly and planned withdrawal. The British Government in need of a "victory" allowed Despard's version of events to stand.

==== Van Dieman's Land ====
Despard left Auckland for Sydney by HEICS Elphinstone on 26 January 1846.

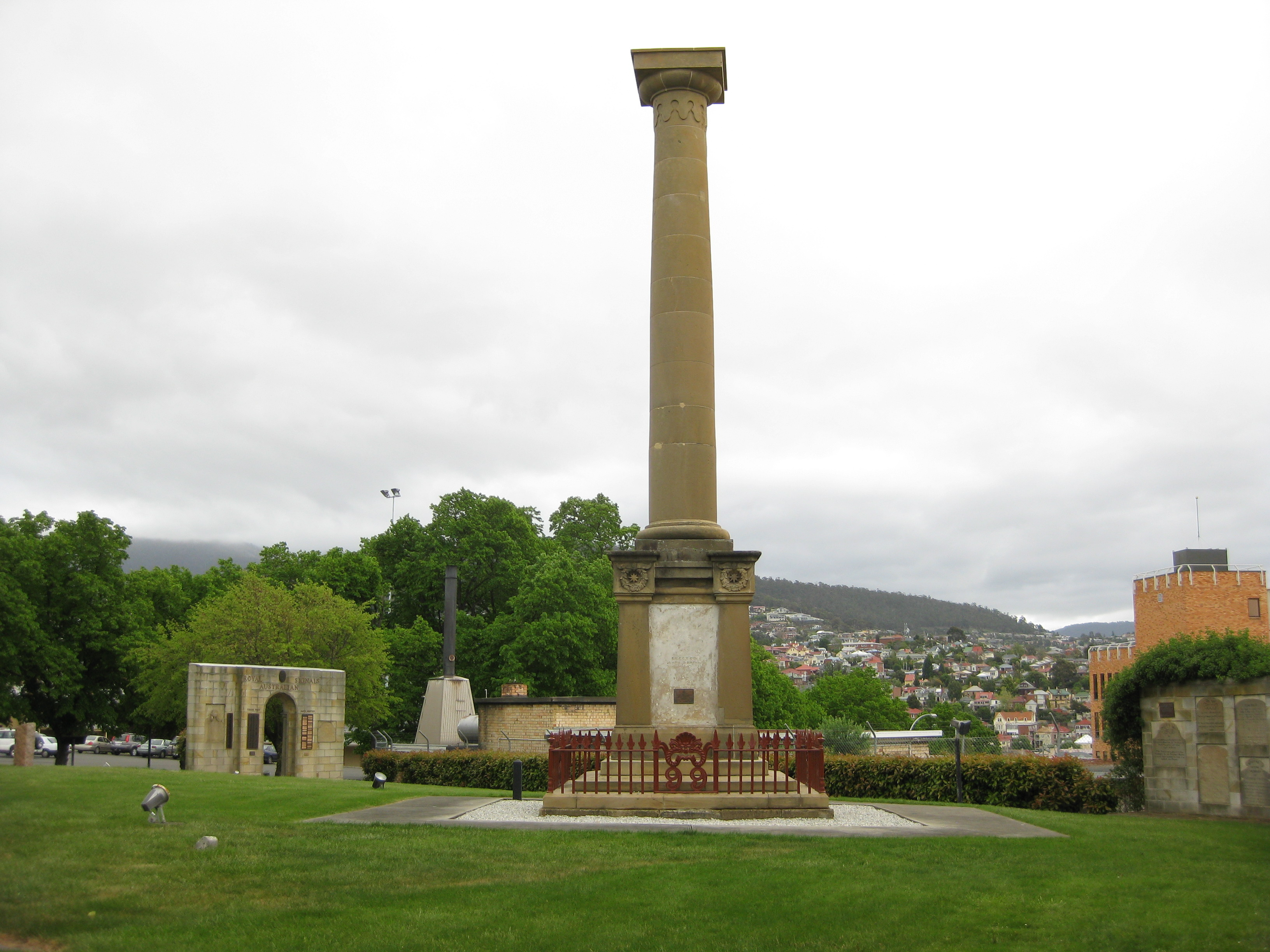
Memorial to the soldiers of the 99th Regiment of Foot who were killed during the New Zealand campaign of 1845–46, erected at Anglesea Barracks, Hobart, in 1850. This is the only monument built by British soldiers in Australia to commemorate lost comrades

Returned to headquarters in Sydney on 13 February 1846, on 2 July Despard was appointed by Queen Victoria to be a Companion of the Most Honorable Military Order of the Bath for his services.

On 22 December 1846, Despard's eldest daughter Sophia Elisabeth married Arbuthnot Dallas, 16th (Grenadiers) Regiment of Bengal Native Infantry, Assistant Secretary to the Military Board, Fort William, at St James's Church, Sydney.

Stationed at Hobart, Van Dieman's Land, the officers, non-commissioned officers and privates of the 99th Regiment subscribed to and erected a Tuscan pillar monument in the barrack square to commemorate the twenty-four soldiers of the regiment who had fallen in the New Zealand campaign of 1845 and 1846. Colonel Despard attended the ceremonial laying of the first stone, the cornerstone, on Monday, 27 May 1850, and spoke of its meaning, observing that "a good soldier who may fall in the service of His Sovereign and Country will not be forgotten, but his memory will be held in grateful recollection, by his comrades who survive to share the laurels he has assisted to purchase with his life." He then read the inscription of a plaque, which was thereafter placed within a cavity below the stone. The monument was designed by Alexander Dawson of the Royal Engineers department. The following inscription appears on the base:

This Pillar is erected by the voluntary subscriptions, of the officers, non-commissioned officers, and privates of the 99th Regiment to perpetuate the memory of the brave men who fell in the service of their Queen and country during the campaign in New Zealand in the years 1845 and 1846.

OFFICERS: Lieut. Edward Beatty, Ensign E. M. Blackburn.

NON-COMMISSIONED OFFICERS: Sergt. Thos Todd.

PRIVATES: Thos. Crook, George Mahey, Jas. Duff, Martin Moran, Jas. French, Jas. Maere, J. Heaton, Henry Moseley, Patrick Higgins, John Noble, J. Hill, W. Pope, James Hynes, Jas. Shaw, Robt. Hughes, Richard Stocks, Benjamin Keidy, Thos. Tuite, John McGrath, Wm. Watson.

Whilst commanding the forces in Van Diemen's Land, he advanced to rank of major general on 20 June 1854, commenced preparations for the return trip to England, and finally took his leave of the 99th Regiment as Commanding Officer on 12 September. The only son, Frederick, a captain of the 99th Regiment, married Rosina Meredith on 7 November at St David's Cathedral, Hobart.

== Last years: England ==
The Despards sailed for London on the barque Wellington on 2 February 1855. Henry Despard died at Baring Crescent, Heavitree, Devon, England, on 30 April 1859, aged 75.

== Publications ==
- Despard, Henry (7 August 1819). "Extract from a Report from Brigadier-General Hardyman to the Adjutant General, dated Camp, Talwarah Ghaut, north bank of the Nerbudda River, 20th December, 1817". The London Gazette. No. 17501. pp. 1384–1385.
- Despard, Henry (1846). "Narrative of an Expedition into the Interior of New Zealand During the Months of June and July, 1845". Colburn's United Service Magazine and Naval and Military Journal. 1846. Part 2. London: H. Hurst: 567–583.
- Despard, Henry (1846). "Narrative of an Expedition into the Interior of New Zealand During the Months of June and July, 1845 (continued)". Colburn's United Service Magazine and Naval and Military Journal. 1846. Part 3. London: H. Hurst: 31–46, 252–267, 371–388.
- Despard, Jane (2016). Fireman, Payton Despard (ed.). The Despards in Ireland, 1572-1838: As Recounted and Written by Ms. Jane Despard of Cheltenham, England in 1838. Payton Fireman Attorney at Law. ISBN 9780983337669.
