= Pearleen Oliver =

Black Canadian activist (1917–2008)

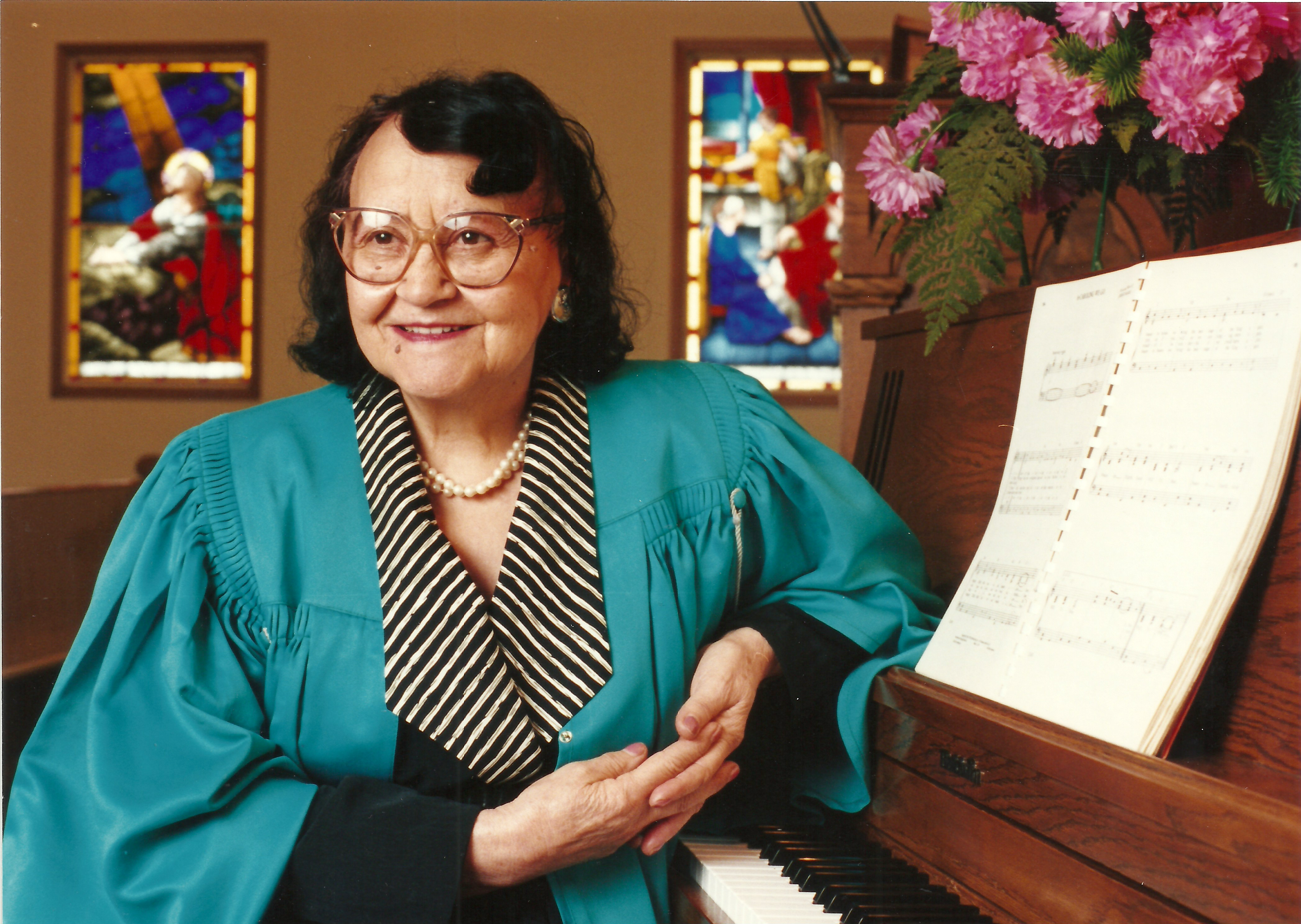
- Oliver at the piano of the Beechville Baptist Church
- Born: Althea Pearleen Borden; 1917; Cook's Cove, Guysborough County, Nova Scotia, Canada
- Died: 24 July 2008 (aged 91); Halifax, Nova Scotia
- Organization: Nova Scotia Association for the Advancement of Colored People (co-founder)
- Known for: Black Activism, Church Leadership, Educational Activism
- Spouse: William Pearly Oliver (married 1936)
- Children: William P., Philip W. B., Dr. Leslie H., Jules R., and Stephen D.

Pearleen Oliver (1917 – 2008), sometimes Pearleen Borden Oliver, was a Black Canadian church leader, an anti Black-racism activist, writer, historian and educator.

She founded the Nova Scotia Association for the Advancement of Coloured People and co-led the Cornwallis Street African Baptist Church. She advocated against the exclusion of Black students from learning nursing, and against racial segregation in education. She received an honorary doctorate degree from Saint Mary's University (Halifax) in 1990.

== Early life and education ==
Oliver was born into a Church of England-following family as Althea "Pearleen" Borden at Cook's Cove near Chedabucto Bay in Guysborough County, Nova Scotia in 1917. Her great-grandfather was an Afro-indigenous slave, her great-grandmother was Dutch and her family was the only Black family in her community. Their daughter, Oliver's grandmother, was Catherine Jewell, who married a man from Newfoundland. Oliver lived in Cook's Cove with her nine brothers and sisters and her mother for her first two years, before moving to New Glasgow to live with her father Joseph Borden (sometimes written Bowden), who worked as a miner in Allen Mines. Her father was killed by a mining accident when she was three or four years old. her mother remarried to a potter who worked at L.E. Shaw's Clay Works in New Glasgow.

Oliver attended New Glasgow High School and was the first Black graduate in 1936. She aspired to work in nursing, but Black students were prohibited from studying nursing in Nova Scotia at the time.

== Career and activism ==
Oliver was a historian, writer, and an educator who founded the Nova Scotia Association for the Advancement of Coloured People. Oliver co-led Halifax's Cornwallis Street African Baptist Church, Nova Scotia's premier late 19th and mid 20th century Black church and hub for many lower socioeconomic status neighborhoods. The church was a cultural hub and social hub for the Black community. As a leader in the Black community Oliver campaigned against racial segregation in schools.

Oliver expanded the African United Baptist Association in 1953 to include a Women’s Institute for Black women to gather annually and discuss racialized socioeconomic problems and their solutions. These women-run church clubs also raised money, through social functions like bake sales, to combat localized social inequities. She campaigned to get the book Little Black Sambo replaced from the reading list at her son's school.

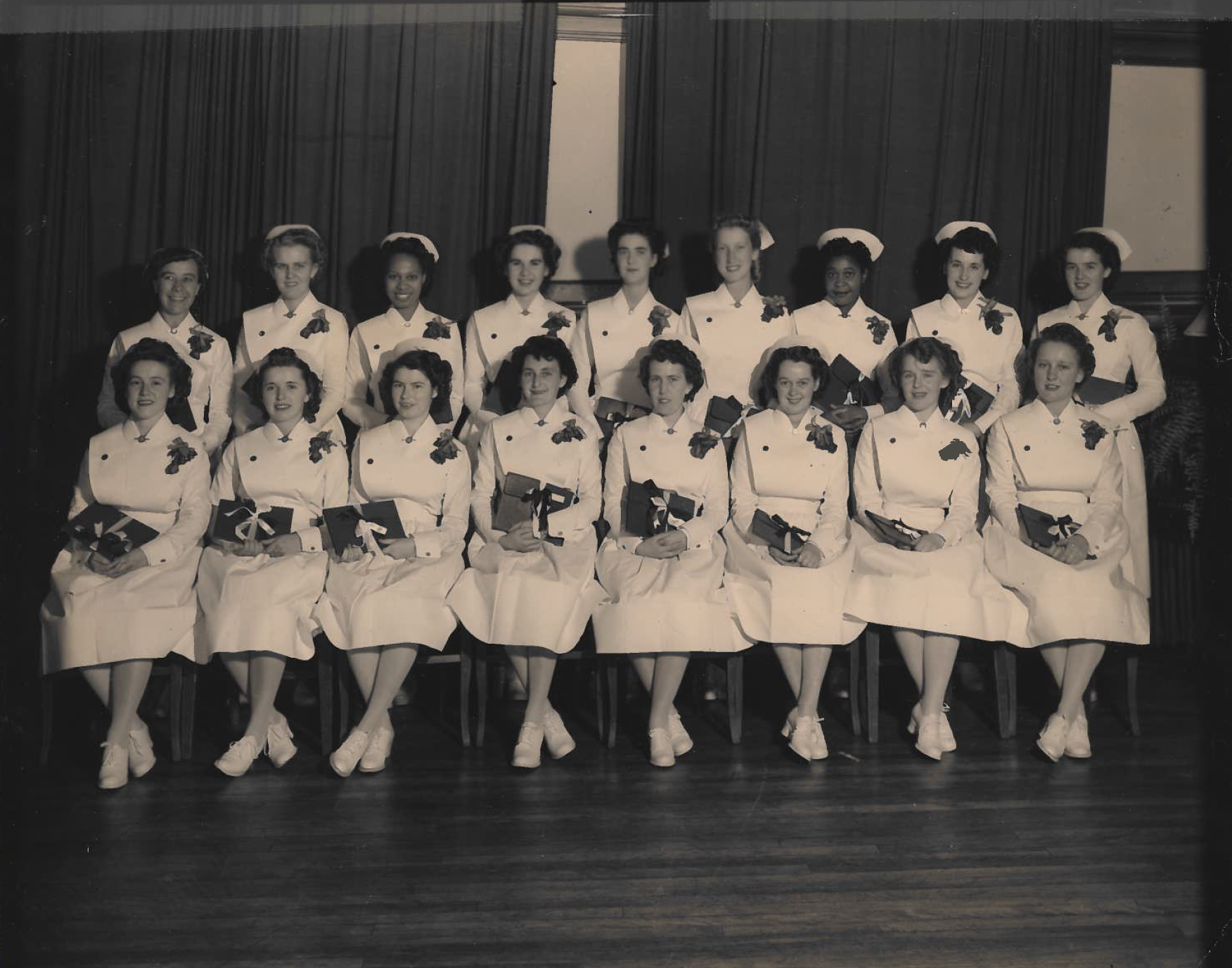
1948 Children's Hospital School of Nursing with Gwen Barton (Back Row - Third from Left) and Ruth Bailey (Back Row - Third from Right)

After repeatedly denouncing Canada's exclusion of Black women from nursing, Halifax's Children's Hospital had Oliver select two Black applicants for admittance and training. Oliver selected Gwenyth Barton and Ruth Bailey, who had been rejected from multiple hospitals due to their race despite their educational qualifications. Oliver personally informed them of their admittance and invited Bailey, a Torontonian, to stay with her family until Oliver arranged Bailey's permanent room with another family of the Cornwallis Street Church. Oliver's church network, public speaking, and written correspondence helped Barton and Bailey become the first Black students to attend and graduate nursing school in Canada in 1948.

Oliver received an honorary doctorate degree in Doctor of Humane Letters from Saint Mary's University (Halifax) in 1990.

== Selected publications ==
- A Brief History of the Colored Baptists of Nova Scotia, 1782–1953, Published by the African United Baptist Association of Nova Scotia, in Halifax, 1953

== Personal life, death and legacy ==
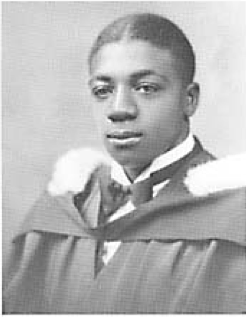
Husband William Pearly Oliver in 1934

Oliver married William Pearly Oliver just before she graduated from high school in 1936. They had five sons William Jr., Leslie, Jules, Steven and Philip.

Her brother Hector Borden was the father of the actor Walter Borden.

Oliver died in Halifax, Nova Scotia, on 24 July 2008, aged 91. Her life was documented in Ronald Caplan's 2020 book Pearleen Oliver: Canada's Black Crusader for Civil Rights (Cape Breton Books, ISBN 978-1-926908-81-6.)

== See also ==
- Black Nova Scotians
