= George Keith Ralph =

British painter

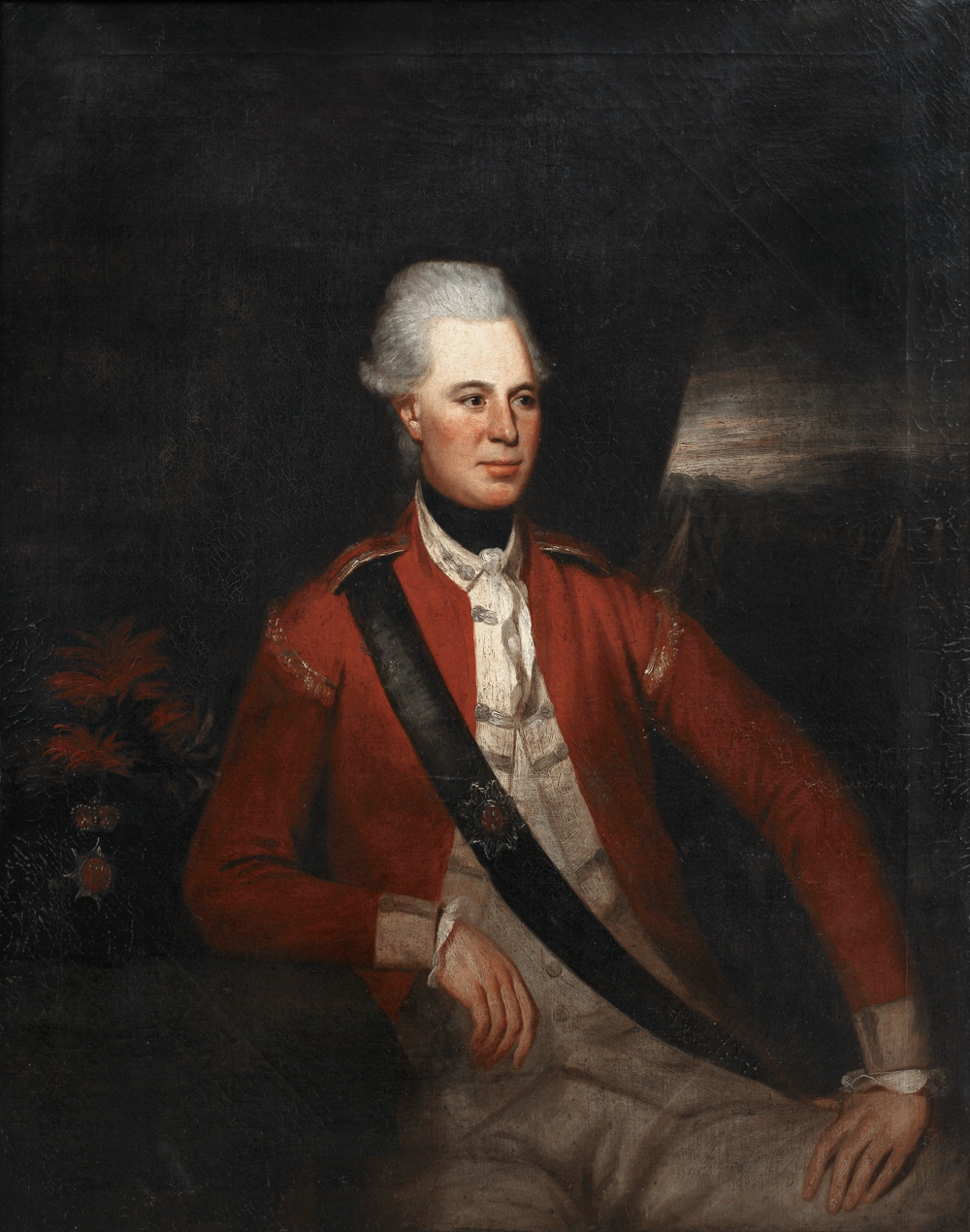
George Keith Ralph, 1780 portrait of William Macarmick

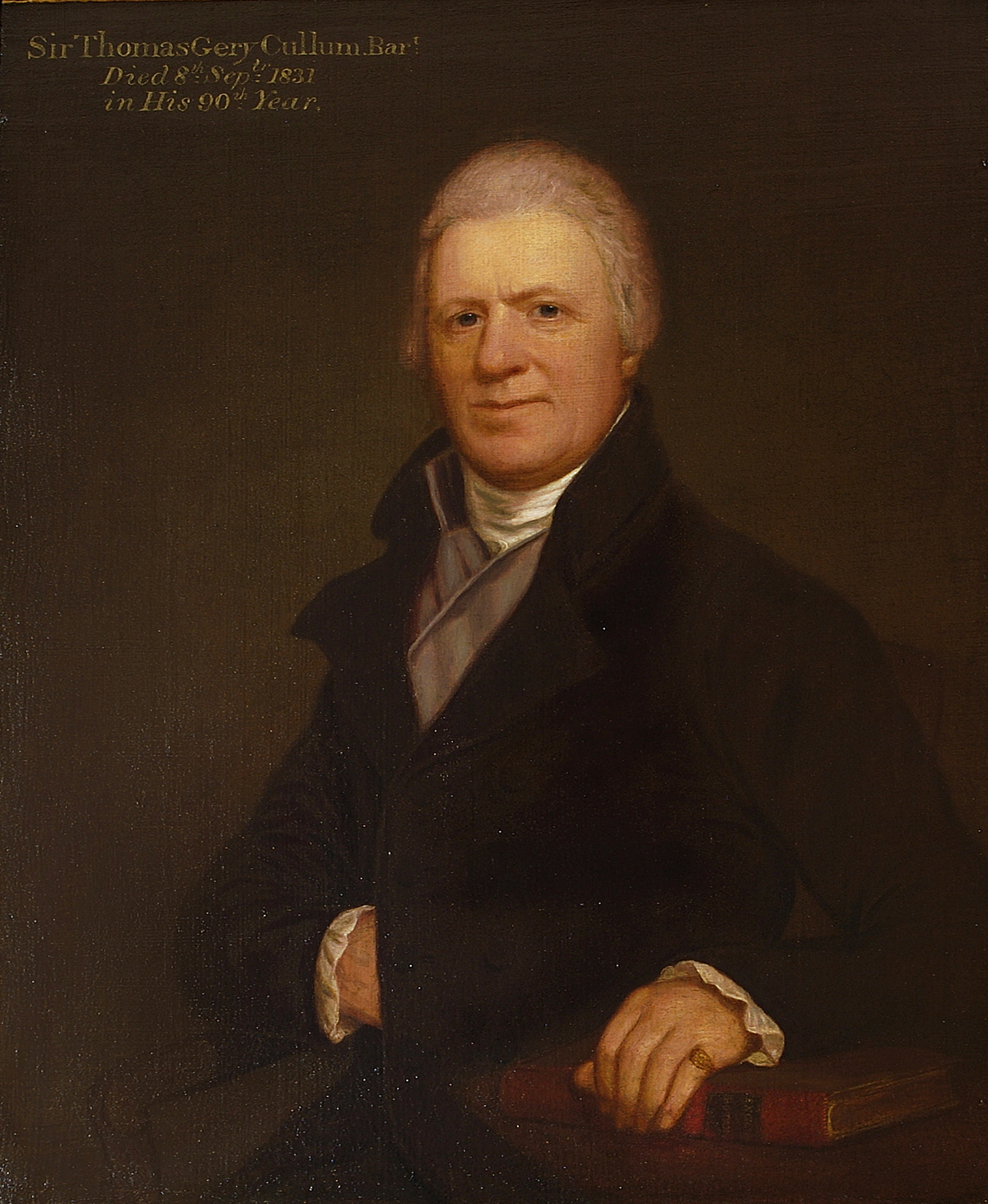
Portrait of Sir Thomas Gery Cullum (1741–1831) by George Keith Ralph.

George Keith Ralph (1752–in or after 1811) was a British portrait-painter.

== Life ==
Ralph was an exhibitor at the Royal Academy from 1778 to 1796. He was appointed portrait-painter to the Duke of Clarence, and exhibited for the last time in 1796.

Ralph found work in the provinces, particularly in the eastern counties. His portraits include one of Lady Mary Bertie in 1788, and one of Mr. King, master of the ceremonies at Bath, in 1790.
