= Richard Gibbons (jurist) =

British jurist and politician

Richard Gibbons (c. 1734 – 3 August 1794) was a British jurist and politician who served as the chief justice of the Colony of Cape Breton, from 1785 until 1788 and again from 1791 until his 1794 death in Nantes, France. Gibbons was a significant figure in the founding of the Colony of Cape Breton and was an ally of its first lieutenant-governor, Joseph Frederick Wallet DesBarres. He was later removed from office by DesBarres' successor William Macarmick, only to be restored after three years and selling of all of his property to advocate on his own behalf. Gibbons never returned to Cape Breton following his restoration, as he and his family were captured and put in a French prison during their return. Gibbons died in the French prison, while his family survived and returned to Cape Breton after their release.

== Early life ==
Gibbons was born around 1734 in London, England, as the son of Richard and Susannah Gibbons. The family first moved to Virginia, later moving to Halifax with his father in May 1750. He was admitted to the Nova Scotia bar in 1765.

== Political career ==
Richard Gibbons occupied positions in the colonial legislature, and as an appointed member of the executive council in the colony. He was first elected in 1770 to the 5th General Assembly of Nova Scotia as a member for the Barrington Township, but the election was deemed invalid. In 1777, Gibbons was appointed the Solicitor General of Cape Breton and in 1781 became the colony's attorney general.

In 1784, Gibbons was appointed as the Chief Justice for Cape Breton by Lieutenant-Governor Joseph Frederick Wallet DesBarres. This occurred after he became involved in a dispute with John Parr, the governor of Nova Scotia, over land grants to United Empire Loyalists. Gibbons was required to sign every land grant, and he argued that he was owed a fee for every individual name listed on the grant. This caused complaints by loyalists, and Parr eventually removed the requirement for Gibbons' signature.

Gibbons was a political ally of DesBarres. In 1786, he presented a petition to the government in London seeking DesBarres' restoration as governor after he had been removed from his position following a dispute with John Yorke, the garrison commander for Cape Breton, the previous year. During that dispute, Gibbons sided with DesBarres and attempted to use legal means to require Yorke to let the governor provide the colonists with military equipment.

When he became lieutenant-governor in 1787, William Macarmick decided to keep Gibbons in his postings in an attempt to bring reconciliation. However, Gibbons was not happy with the new influence that David Matthews, the attorney general, and Abraham Cuyler, the registrar, held under Macarmick. Gibbons sought to raise a quasi-military group under his own command, named the Friendly Society, to counter the influence of the other three. Macarmick suggested instead that an official militia be organized, a move which Gibbons rejected. Following this Macarmick banned the group as a "Seed of Rebellion".

== Later life and death ==
In 1788, following the failure of the Friendly Society, Gibbons attempted to have the grand jury be made the legislative assembly for the Colony of Cape Breton. Macmarick rejected this, and removed Gibbons from his various posts in March. Gibbons' dismissal was controversial amongst his supporters, and he attempted to explain his decisions to authorities in Quebec, Halifax, and London. These efforts were costly, and he sold his farm and other property to pay for them. He was restored to his posts in 1791, but did not attempt to return to Cape Breton until 1794. During his return trip, he and his family were captured and arrested in France. He died during his imprisonment on 4 August 1794 in Nantes, France.
