= Whitehead Hicks =

43rd Mayor of New York City

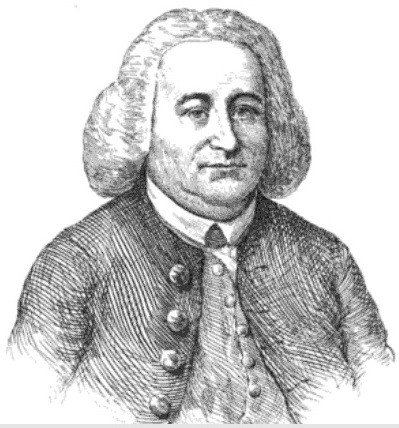

43rd Mayor of New York City
- In office 1766–1776
- Preceded by: John Cruger Jr.
- Succeeded by: David Mathews

Personal details
- Born: August 24, 1728 Flushing, Queens, New York
- Died: October 4, 1780 (aged 52) Flushing, Queens, New York

Whitehead Hicks (August 24, 1728 – October 4, 1780) was the 43rd Mayor of New York City from 1766 to 1776.

== Family and early life ==
Coat of Arms of Whitehead Hicks

Hicks came from a Quaker family which settled and lent its name to Hicksville, New York. Hicks studied law under William Smith and was admitted to practice in 1750. The son of Judge Thomas Hicks, he was a lawyer and served on the New York Supreme Court of Judicature. He married Charlotte Brevoort, the daughter of John and Louisa (Kockerman) Brevoort.

== Loyalism ==
Hicks was a Loyalist and was the first to appear in front of a committee of nine colonials formed by the New York Provincial Congress in 1776 to investigate "domestic enemies" "disaffected to the American cause". He met with this committee on June 15, 1776, indicating his loyalty to George III. He was subsequently put on parole. A street in the Bronx, NY is named in his honor (Hicks Street)

After resigning from the mayoralty, he served as a judge before eventually retiring to his farm on Long Island. He died there at the age of 52 years in 1780. He was buried in Queens.

== Mayor from Queens ==
He was the first mayor to be born in what is now modern-day Queens.
