= Manassette Lake, Nova Scotia =

Community in Nova Scotia, Canada

Coordinates: 45°25′55.02″N 61°20′30.55″W

Manassette Lake in Nova Scotia

Manassette Lake, is a rural community in the Canadian province of Nova Scotia, located in the Municipality of the District of Guysborough in Guysborough County.

== Geography ==
Manassette Lake lies along Route 344 on the northern shore of Chedabucto Bay.
