= Fort St. Louis (Guysborough County, Nova Scotia) =

French fort in Acadia

Fort St. Louis (also known as Fort St. Francois a Canso, Fort Chedabuctou, Fort St. Louis a Chedabuctou) was a French fort built at Chedabucto, Acadia (present day Guysborough, Nova Scotia). English and later British forces attacked several times during the late 17th and early 18th centuries.

== Early Fortifications ==
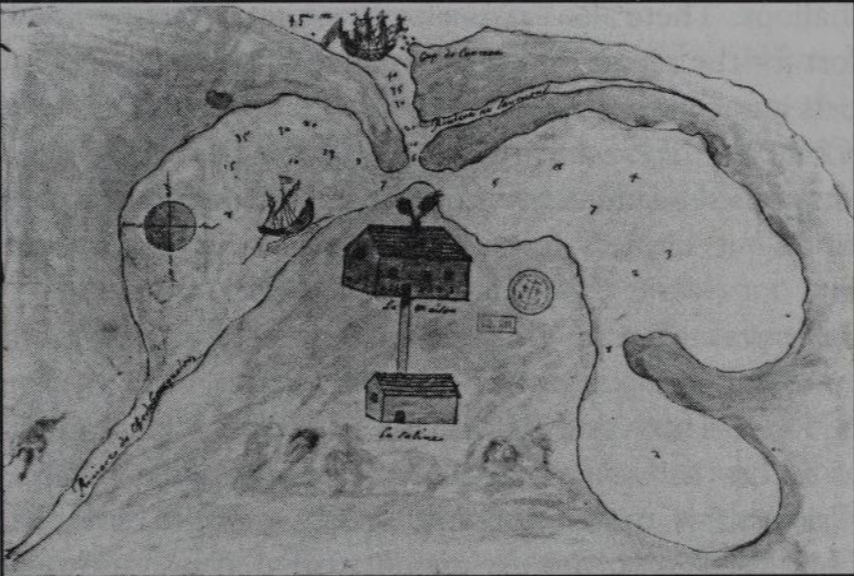
Map of Fort St François à Canso, dated to 1634, unknown author.

=== Fort St François à Canso ===
In 1634, Isaac de Razilly built a small fort named Fort St François à Canso at the entrance to the harbour, on a peninsula now known as Fort Point. The fort at this time consisted of two wooden buildings: La Maison (the habitation) and La Saline (salt storage, essential for the fishery).

==== Jean Thomas' Revolt ====
In July 1635, the fort was attacked and seized by a rogue French trader named Jean Thomas and Mi'kmaq warriors he had recruited. The commander of the fort was seriously wounded in the assault. Razilly urgently sent a warship carrying reinforcements and the fort was retaken.

=== Fort Chedabuctou ===
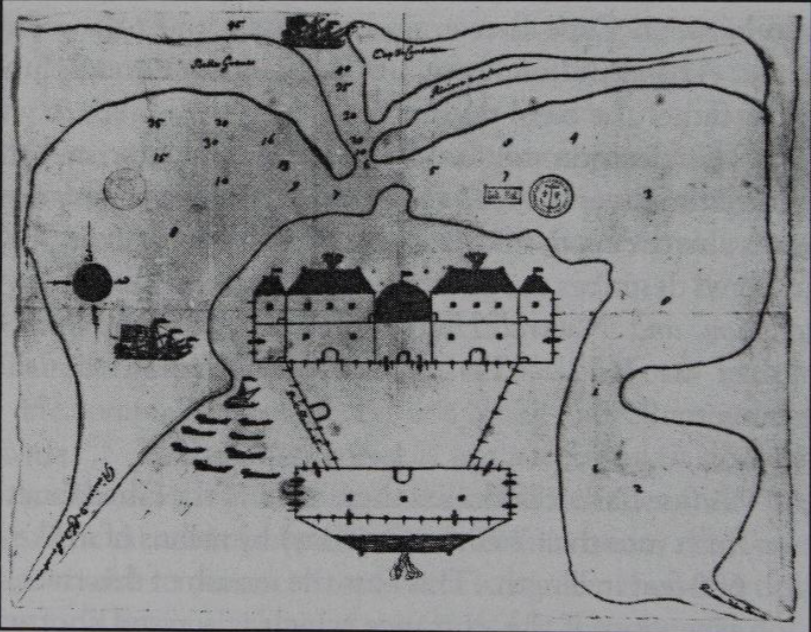
Map of Fort Chedabuctou dated to 1661, unknown author.

In 1655 Nicolas Denys, governor of the new St Lawrence Bay Province, built Fort Chedabuctou on Fort Point to serve as his capital, replacing Razilly's previous fortification. The fort consisted of a sizable fortified stone lodge and separate warehouse. Denys commented that the lodge could house 120 men. In 1661, Denys added two bastion towers on either end of the lodge, each armed with two cannons and several swivel guns. A wall of earth filled barrels going from either end of the lodge to the warehouse was also built, creating an enclosed courtyard. The fort remained operational until 1672.

== Fort St. Louis ==
On Feb 28 1682, a group of merchants from La Rochelle, France, led by Clerbaud Bergier and Gabriel Gautier, were granted rights to establish a colonial company on the shores of Acadia. The Company of Acadia (Compagnie de la Peche Sedentaire) was established that year and quickly established a monopoly on the Chedabuctou/Canso fishery. Nicholas Deny's lodge was repaired, a new warehouse built, and the fort was reestablished as Fort St. Louis. Land was cleared in 1683 and a settlement was established to produce food for the fort and fishery. The primary port for the company was Chedabuctou, which accounted for 50 fishermen in 1686.

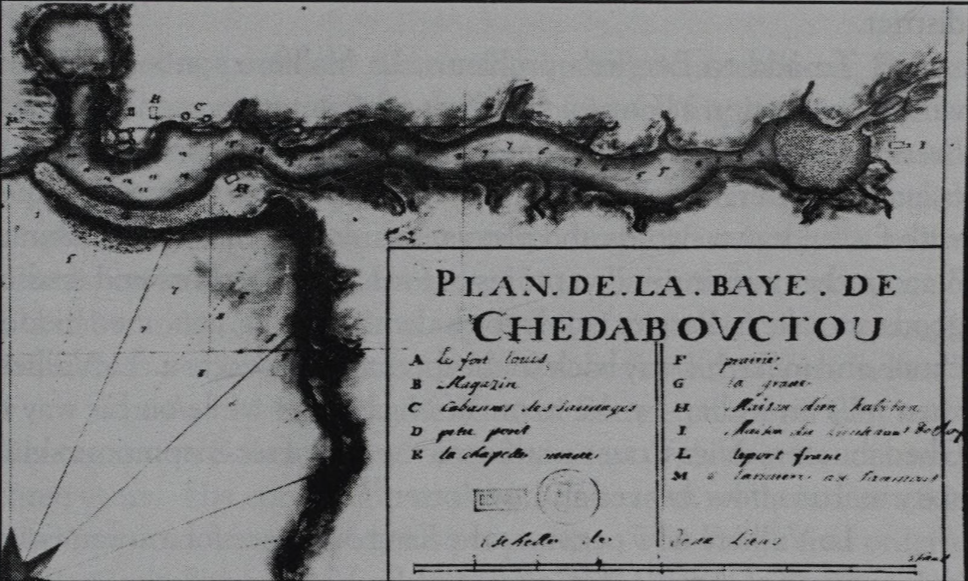
Fort St. Louis and its surroundings, drawn by unknown cartographer in 1686

In 1686, just before the outbreak of King William's War, Gabriel Gautier expanded the forts defences. Earthworks, a log palisade, ditch, and stone wall with bastions were constructed to defend the fort. Following a request by the company, a detachment of French regular troops was stationed at the fort, with a separate barracks built to house the garrison. In 1687 there were 150 persons at Chedabouctou, 80 of whom were fishermen. Louis-Alexandre des Friches de Meneval landed at Chedabouctou in 1687 when arriving to take up his position as governor of Acadia.

=== Raid on Chedabucto (1688) ===
In August 1688, during King William's War, raiders from New England pillage the fort and fishery. The fort is taken when a soldier opens the gate in the morning and all the others are still asleep, leading to the lone soldier being overwhelmed by the raiders hiding near the gate. The pillaging of the fort is a financial disaster for the company, with several large ships being captured. In the aftermath of this failure, the Company of Acadia is reorganised and a garrison of French Troupes de la Marine are stationed at Fort St. Louis, and the defences are enhanced by a French military engineer. Dauphin de Montorgueil was made commandant of the garrison.

=== Battle at Chedabucto (1690) ===
Later in King William's War, as part of Sir William Phips's expedition to destroy the capital of Acadia, Port Royal, Phips sent Captain Cyprian Southack to Chedabacto with 80 men to destroy Fort St. Louis and the surrounding French fishery. Southack landed his troops at present day Cook's Cove and proceeded overland to attack the fort. The French garrison of 25 soldiers defended the fort for over six hours, inflicting loses on the New Englanders. Southack led his men close to the fort and used fire bombs to set the fort ablaze, with the French troops surrendering. Southack spent several days demolishing the fort and destroying the enormous amount of 50,000 crowns of fish.

The fort was reopened in 1692 to protect the Acadians of Chedabuctou from further attacks. The Company of Acadia once again reformed and reestablished itself at Chedabuctou in 1697, but encountered a variety of difficulties on the way to its final disappearance in 1702. In 1712, the area was granted to French privateer Bernard Lasonde for services during Queen Anne's War. Lasonde swore allegiance to the British following the Treaty of Utrecht, but also worked against them for the French, who still claimed the Chedabuctou/Canso region.

=== Raid on Chedabucto (1718) - The Squirrel Affair ===
Shortly after Southack established himself at Shelburne, Nova Scotia, the Mi'kmaq raided the station and burned it to the ground. In response, from 17 to 24 September 1718, Southack led a raid on Canso and Chedabucto in what became known as the Squirrel Affair. Southack first destroyed the fishing village on the Canso Islands. Southack then laid siege for three days to Fort St. Louis, which was defended primarily by the local Acadians. On 18 September, British marines landed across the harbour from the fort on Lasonde's Grave (today McCauls Island) and seized the entrance to Chedabucto Harbour. The following day HMS Squirrel landed troops at Salmon River, who proceeded to the rear of the village. HMS Squirrel made its first attempt to enter the harbour but was beaten back by the Acadian cannon fire from the fort. Later in the day the village was captured by the landed troops. On 20 September HMS Squirrel made a second attempt to enter the harbour, and successfully fired upon the fort. On 23 September, Southack burned the village and loaded the goods onto the French transports that had been captured in the harbour. On 24 September, after pillaging and burning the village and fort, Southack released his Acadian prisoners onto the Canso Islands and sailed back to Boston.

== Later History ==
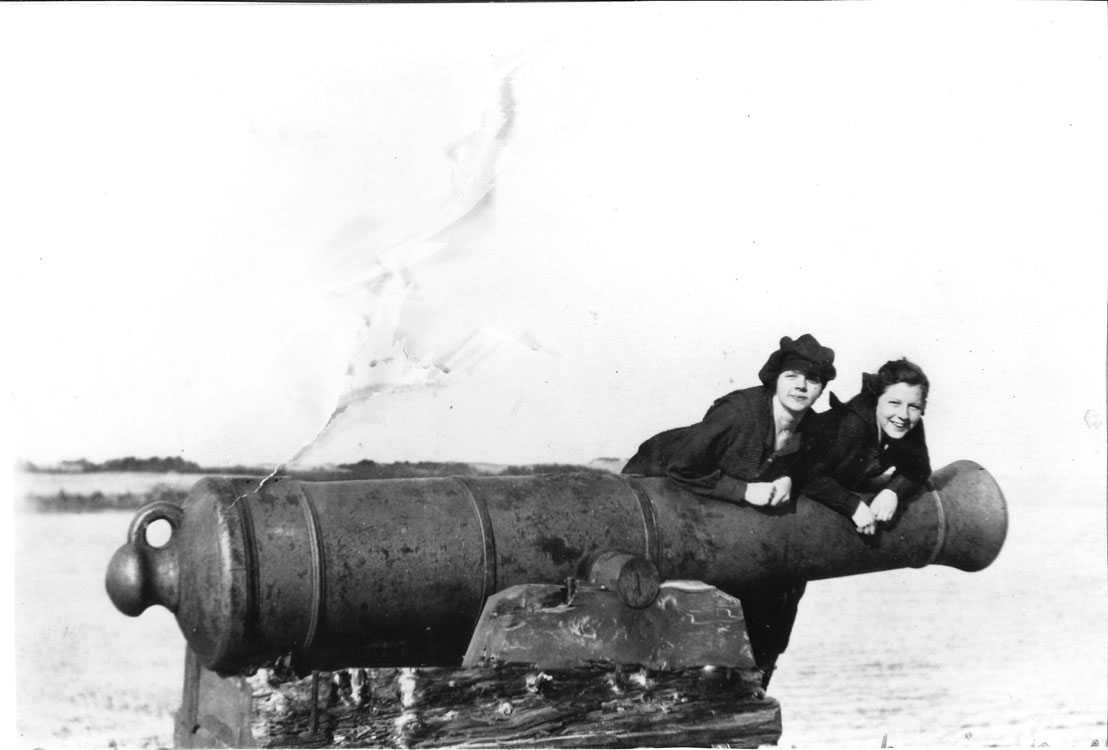
Two young women leaning on a cannon at Fort Point circa 1920

The fort was still shown on maps of the area until the mid 18th century, and the area became known as Milfort to the English. This name became Milford, which was the name of the early English settlement in the area before Guysborough was founded in 1784.

During the war of 1812, a wooden blockhouse was built on the site of the old fort to defend Guysborough from possible American raids. The land remained in reserve by the British and later Canadian militaries until it was eventually sold to a private land owner in the 1960s. The ruins of the old fortifications were completely destroyed when the land was bulldozed and a house was constructed on the site, but many artifacts were and continue to be recovered from the area.

== See also ==
- Military history of the Acadians
- Military history of Nova Scotia
- Military history of the Mi’kmaq people
- List of French forts in North America
