= Boylston, Nova Scotia =

Community in Nova Scotia, Canada

Boylston in Nova Scotia

Boylston is a rural community in the Canadian province of Nova Scotia, in the Municipality of the District of Guysborough in Guysborough County. There is a provincial park campground in Boylston.

== Geography ==
Boylston is at the intersection of Trunk 16 and Route 344, and lies on the eastern side of the Milford Haven River.

== History ==
Boylston was likely first visited by the indigenous Mi'kmaq. In October 1765, Boylston was part of the 20,000 acres granted to Benjamin Hallowell of Boston for settlement. No significant progress on surveying or settling these lands were made until it passed to his two sons, Benjamin Hallowell Jr., and Ward Nicholas Boylston.

The area was surveyed in 1786, and a plan for a town named Boylston was made, named for Thomas Boylston. The planned town attracted few settlers in comparison to the rural 150 acre lots that were surveyed, and became part of the broader Manchester Township. Throughout the 19th century, a village grew on the site of the old town plan, and by the late 19th century the community was once again named as Boylston.

Boylston was the economic hub for the surrounding area. Regular steamships carried upwards of a thousand passengers a week up the Milford Haven River to and from Boylston in the late 19th and early 20th centuries.

== Attractions ==
- Boylston Provincial Park
- Atwater Municipal Park
