= Atlantic Neptune =

Eighteenth-century atlas by Joseph Frederick Wallet Des Barres

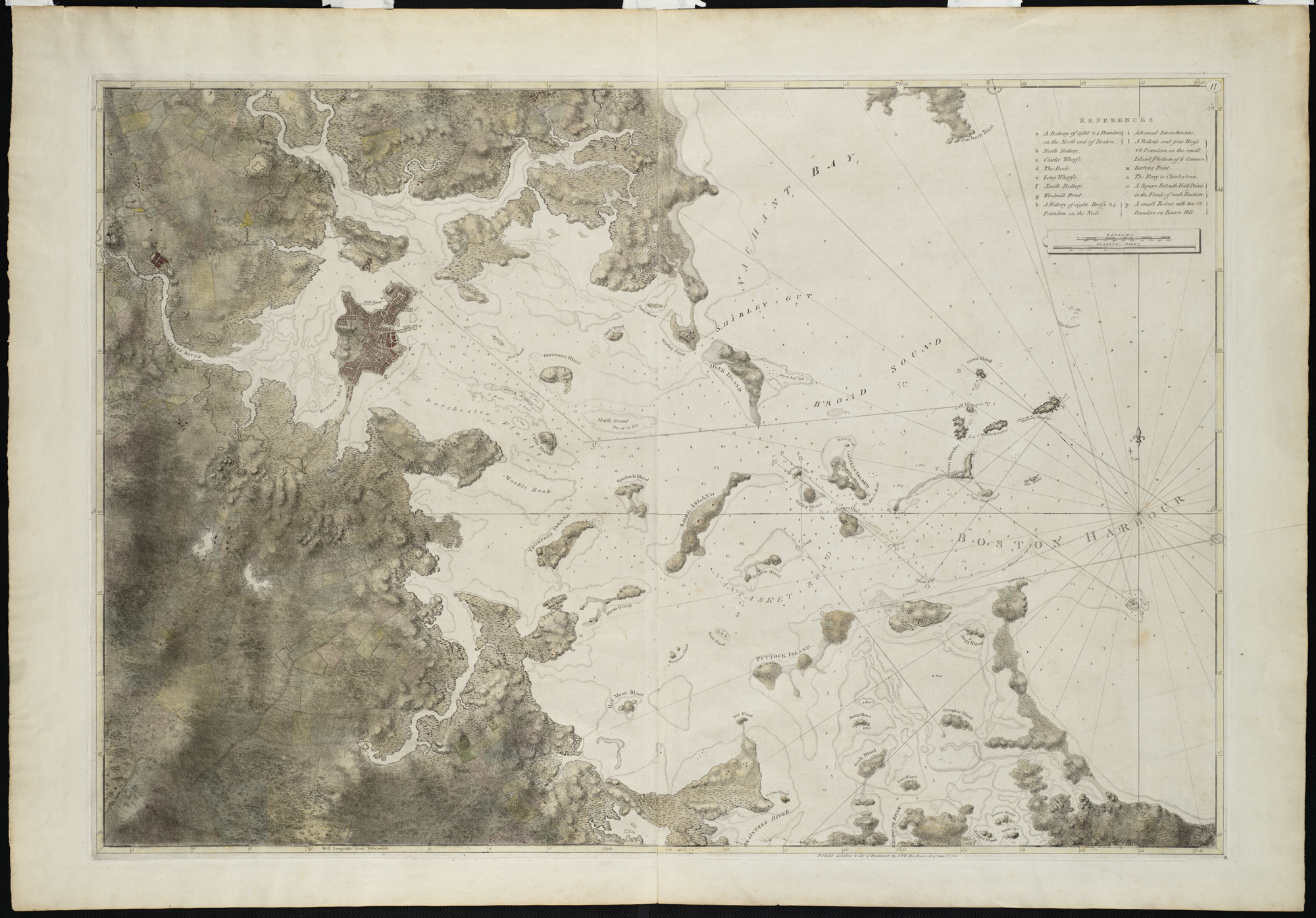
A survey of Boston Harbor, first published in 1775

The Atlantic Neptune is a monumental four volume atlas which was the most important collection of maps, charts and views of North America published in the eighteenth century. It was created by Colonel Joseph Frederick Wallet Des Barres.

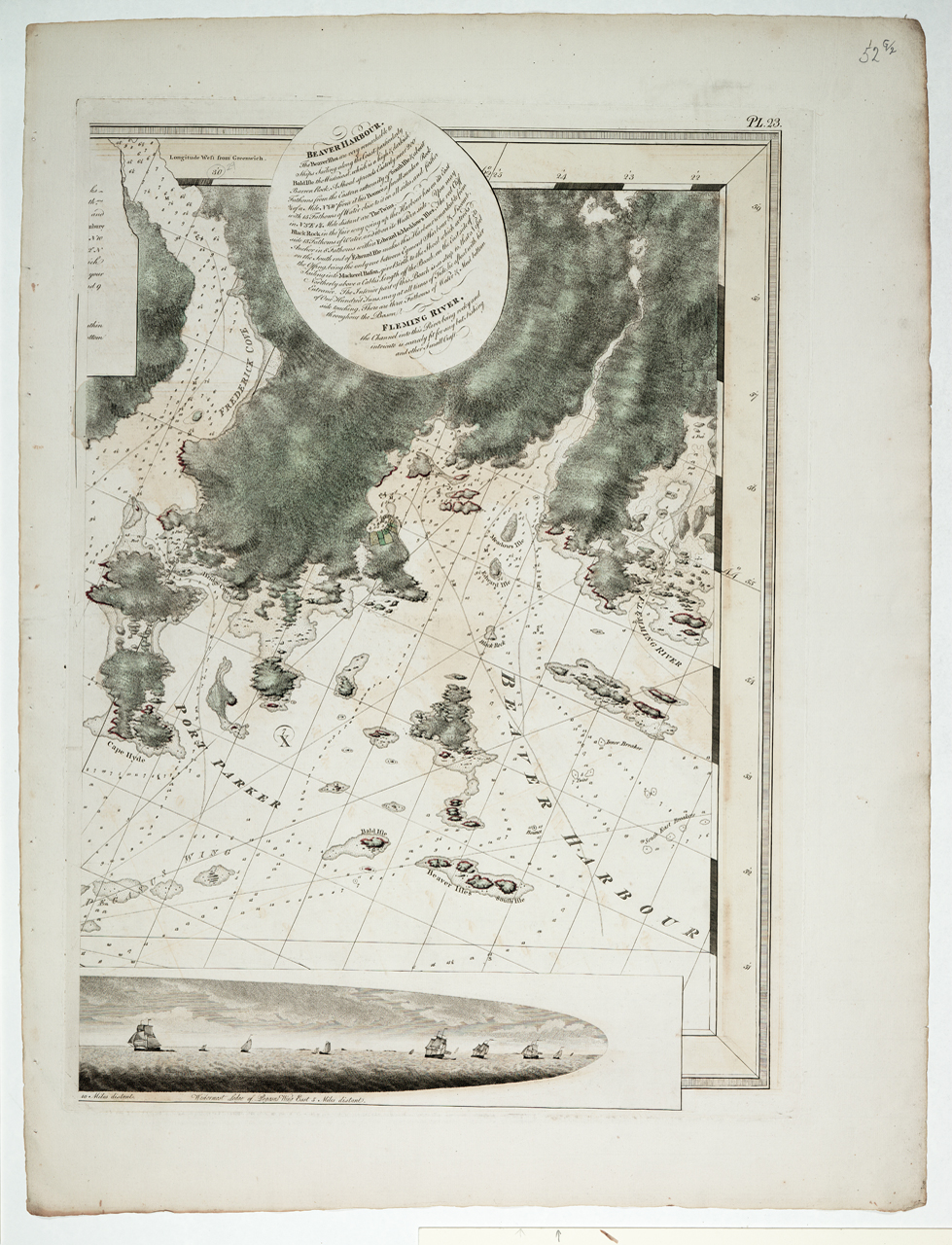
Spry Harbour to Flemming River

Des Barres made many maps of the Atlantic, mapping the coast of North America from Newfoundland to New York. His survey of the coast of Nova Scotia took approximately ten years due its length and intricacy. Des Barres was exasperated with the work stating "There is scarcely any known shore so much intersected with Bays, Harbours, and Creeks as this is ... and the Offing of it is so full of Islands, Rocks, and Shoals as are almost innumerable." The survey work was carried out in the summer and in the winter he would retire to his estate, Castle Frederick, in Falmouth, Nova Scotia to complete his charts and drawings. In 1774 under direction for the British Admiralty, Des Barres compiled and edited his and many others' charts and maps of eastern North America. The completed work Atlantic Neptune was published in 1777, having cost the Admiralty an estimated £100,000.

== See also ==
- History of cartography
