= Hadleyville, Nova Scotia =

Community in Nova Scotia, Canada

Coordinates: 45°27′46.87″N 61°16′54.26″W

Hadleyville in Nova Scotia

Hadleyville is a small community in the Canadian province of Nova Scotia, located in the Municipality of the District of Guysborough in Guysborough County.
