= Cooks Cove =

Community in Nova Scotia, Canada

- Location within Nova Scotia
- Coordinates: 45.363202°N 61.487652°W
- Country: Canada
- Province: Nova Scotia
- County: Guysborough County
- First settled: c. 1770

Cooks Cove is a rural community on the furthest western point of Chedabucto Bay in Guysborough County, Nova Scotia.

== History ==
The first inhabitants of Cooks Cove were the Mi'kmaq, who had seasonal settlements in the area. The Mi'kmaq name for the area was L'nui-wutanji'j, meaning "little native settlement".

Cooks Cove named after John and Elias Cook of Marblehead, Massachusetts who settled at the cove around 1770 Land grants were issued to the Cooks and the seven other families who had been living in the area for some years in 1787, when large numbers of Loyalists were settling in the area. A Methodist church and schoolhouse were built in the early 1820's.

Twenty-two people from seven Mi'kmaq families lived in Cooks Cove in 1949. The Mi'kmaq of the area were relocated to Eskasoni during the provincial governments policy of uprooting and centralizing small Mi'kmaq communities during the 1940's.

The population in 1956 was 105.

== Notable people ==
Pearleen Oliver (1917–2008) spent her infant years in Cooks Cove.

== See also ==
- List of communities in Nova Scotia

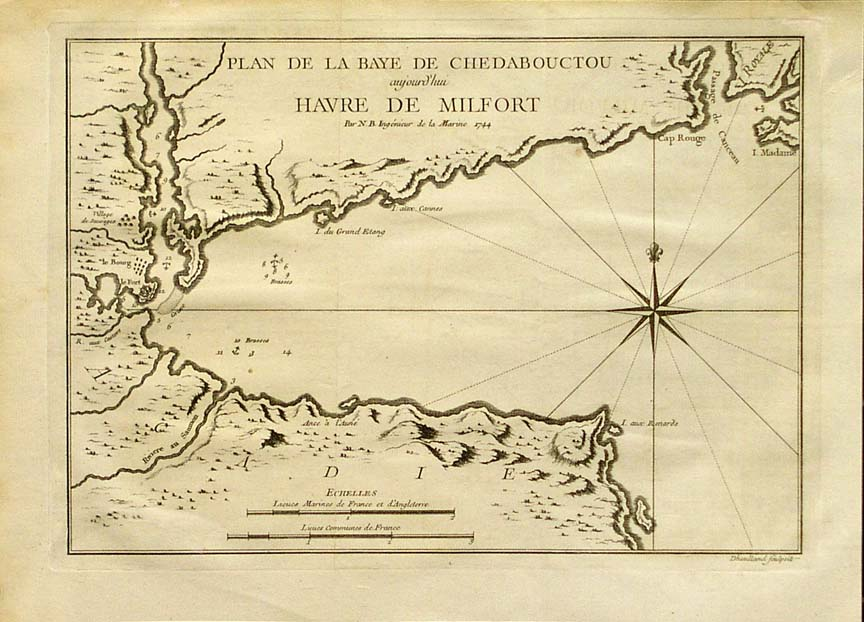
1744 map of Chedabucto Bay
