= Joseph Frederick Wallet DesBarres =

Swiss cartographer

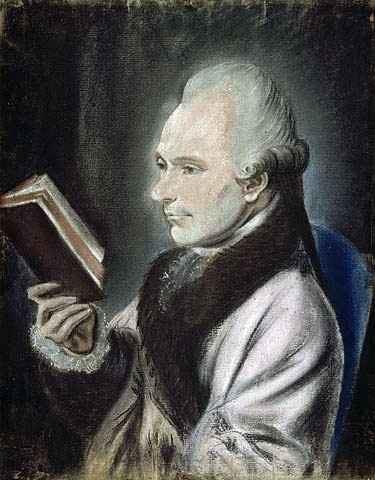
DesBarres

Joseph Frederick Wallet DesBarres (22 November 1721 – 27 October 1824) was a Canadian cartographer who served in the Seven Years' War, as the aide-de-camp to General James Wolfe.

DesBarres is perhaps best known as the creator the monumental four-volume Atlantic Neptune, the most important collection of maps, charts and views of North America published in the eighteenth century. He later went on to serve as the Lieutenant-Governor of Cape Breton Colony and later as Lieutenant-Governor of Prince Edward Island.

Colonel DesBarres is buried with his wife under St. George's (Round) Church, Halifax, Nova Scotia.

== Early life ==
DesBarres, who is seen as having lived through important changes in Nova Scotia's history, is thought to have been born in Basel, Switzerland (although Montbéliard has also been suggested), and was a member of a Huguenot family. His parents were Joseph-Leonard Vallet DesBarres and Anne-Catherine Cuvier and he was the eldest of their three children. DesBarres read mathematics and art at the University of Basel, studying under John and Daniel Bernoulli. Upon the completion of his studies he left for England. There he enrolled at the Royal Military Academy, Woolwich. It was there that DesBarres trained to become a military officer, and studied military surveying. His training would also benefit him later in life for surveying, map making, and coastal charting. In 1756 he was commissioned into the Royal Americans (the 62nd Foot later known as the 60th Foot).

=== Seven Years' War ===
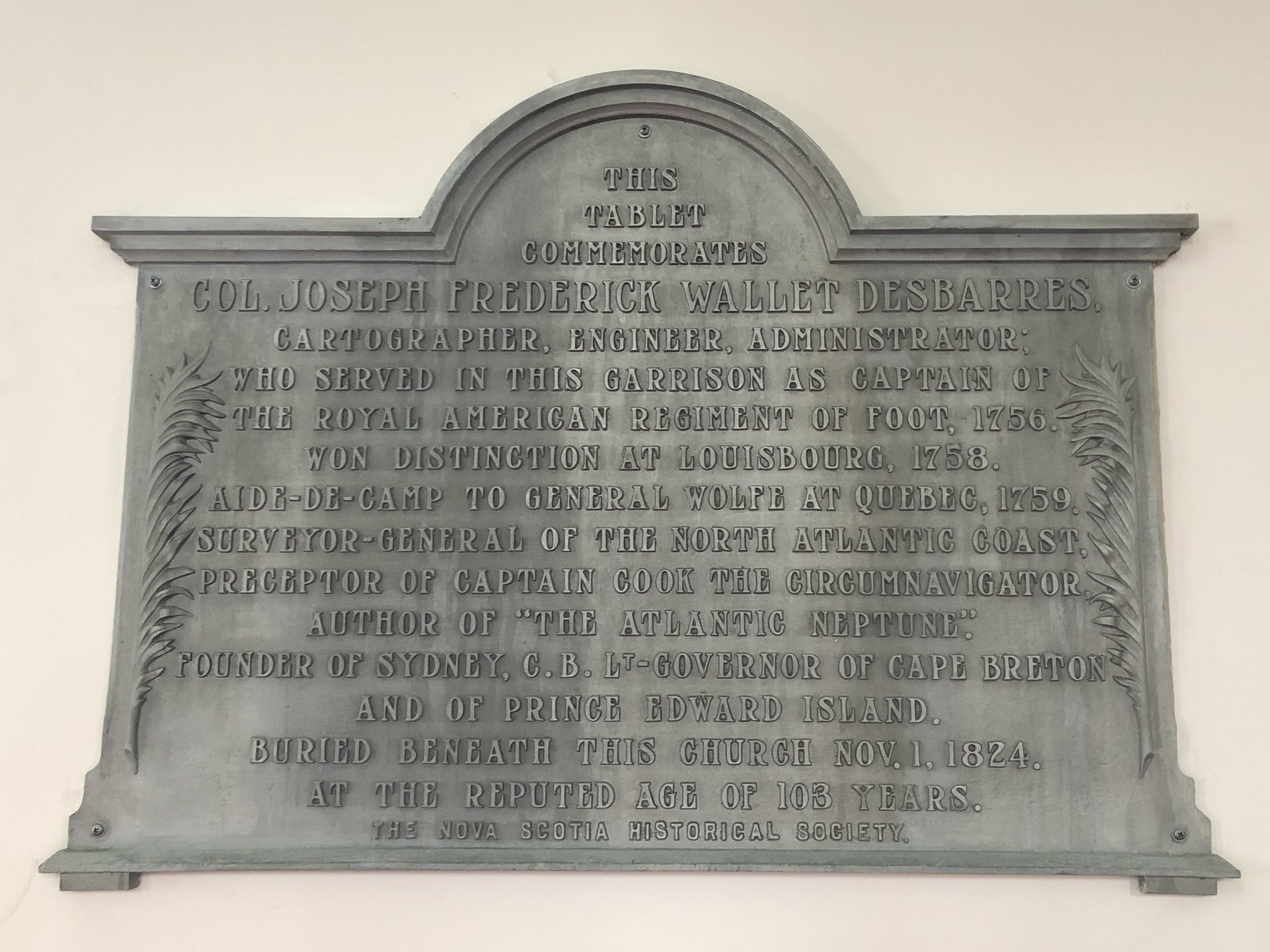
Joseph Frederick Wallet DesBarres Monument, St. George's (Round) Church, Halifax, Nova Scotia

In 1756 DesBarres sailed to North America and was with Edward Boscawen's fleet when it attacked the Fortress of Louisbourg in 1758. He distinguished himself by capturing a French entrenchment at Kennington Cove. Soon he was put to work charting the Gulf of St. Lawrence and the approaches to Quebec, information that would be used the following year in James Wolfe's assault on the City of Quebec. In 1760 he was at Halifax to prepare plans for the city's defences and naval yard.

Jonathan Binney and DesBarres met the Mi'kmaq chiefs at Arichat, Nova Scotia, in 1761, and concluded a lasting peace.

By 1762 he was sent to Newfoundland to survey Harbour Grace and Carbonear and to draw up plans for new harbour defences to replace those destroyed by the French. James Cook was sent as his assistant. (DesBarres may have met Cook earlier at either Louisbourg or Halifax.)

== Castle Frederick ==
DesBarres established an 8,000-acre (3,200 ha) estate at Falmouth, Nova Scotia, known as Castle Frederick, which served as his base of operations from 1764 until he returned to England in 1773 having completed his survey using HMS Diligent schooner. The 1770 Nova Scotia census indicates Castle Frederick had a staff of 41 men, 13 women, 5 boys, and 33 girls. One of the women, Mary Cannon, served as housekeeper and manager of Castle Frederick from 1764 to 1794. She also administered tenant farmers on DesBarres' land holdings of 20,000 acres (8,100 ha) in Tatamagouche, 40,000 acres (16,000 ha) in New Brunswick and approximately 15,000 acres (6,100 ha) in Maccan, Nappan, and Minudie. His Tatamagouche holdings formed the western coastal boundary of the Philadelphia grant.

== Atlantic Neptune ==
DesBarres made many maps of the Atlantic, mapping the coast of North American from Newfoundland to New York. His survey of the coast of Nova Scotia took approximately ten years due its length and intricacy. DesBarres was exasperated with the work, stating "There is scarcely any known shore so much intersected with Bays, Harbours, and Creeks as this is" "and the Offing of it is so full of Islands, Rocks, and Shoals as are almost innumerable." The survey work was carried out in the summer and in the winter he would retire to Castle Frederick to complete his charts and drawings. His most notable work is the Atlantic Neptune. In 1774 under direction for the British Admiralty, DesBarres compiled and edited his and many others' charts and maps of eastern North America. The completed work was published in 1777, having cost the Admiralty an estimated £100,000.

== Governor ==
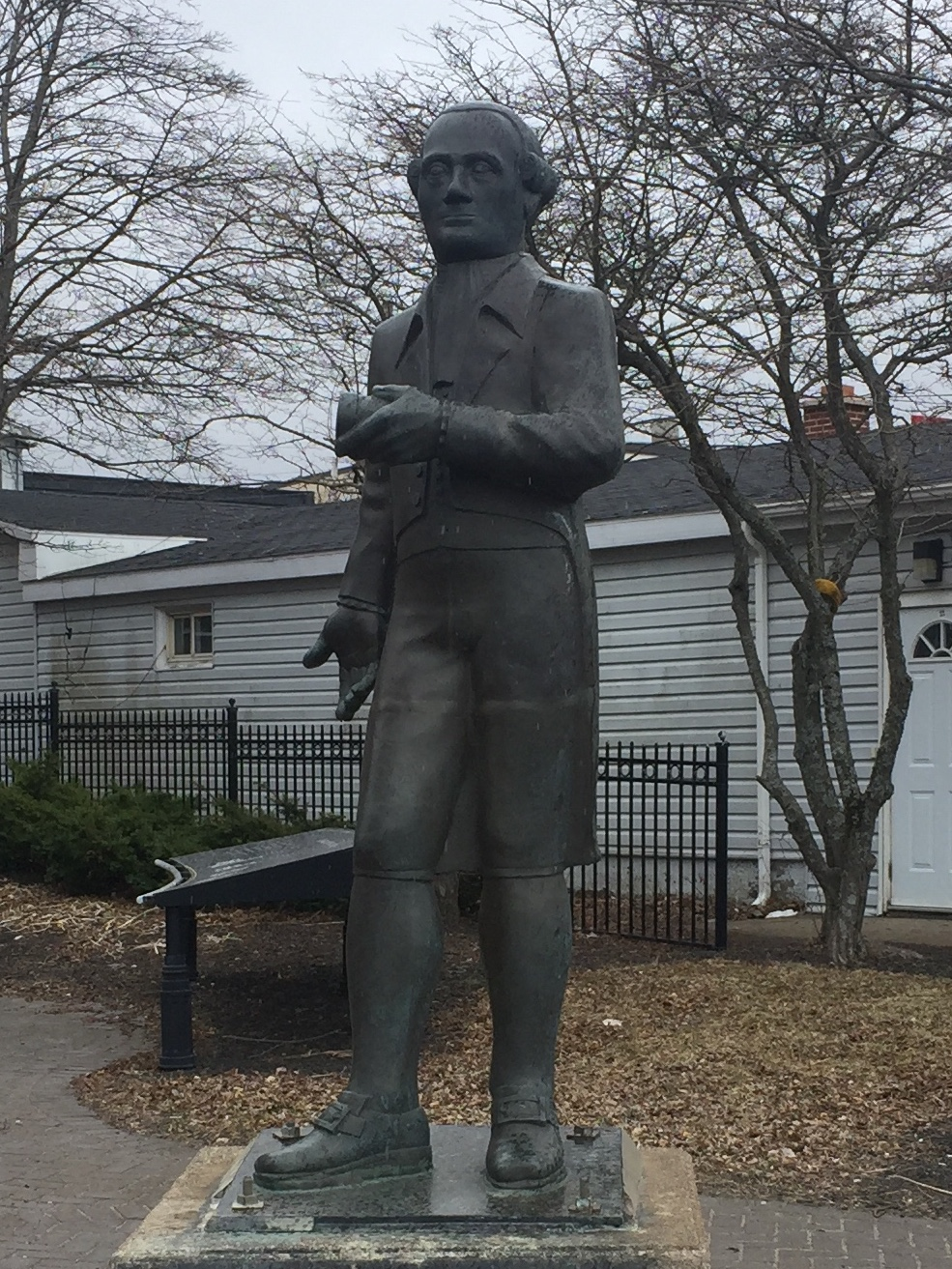
Joseph Frederick Wallet DesBarres with Atlantic Neptune maps, Sydney, Nova Scotia

To accommodate the arrival of the United Empire Loyalists, Cape Breton was created as a separate colony from Nova Scotia (as was New Brunswick) and DesBarres served as the lieutenant governor of Cape Breton from 1784 to 1787.

Based on his own and cartographer Samuel Holland’s assessments, DesBarres believed Cape Breton had the possibility for substantial prosperities. However, at the time of 1784, the population of the island was under 2000, and primarily scattered through various settlements of Mi’kmaq and Acadian communities. According to DesBarres, the island's primary hurdle to prosperity was a lack of population and governing body, which he resolved to rectify. He laid out the original plan of the capital, Sydney.

He was later governor of Prince Edward Island from 1804 to 1812. Dalhousie University has a number of items of Colonel DesBarres in one of its archive collections.

He died at the age of 102, and his date of death is variously given as 24 and 27 October. Colonel DesBarres is buried St. George's (Round) Church, Halifax, Nova Scotia. While he was buried beside his wife Martha, he was survived by his mistress Mary Cannon and their four children. His funeral took place in St. George's (Round) Church in 1824.

== Publications ==
- Atlantic Neptune (atlas of Eastern North America)

== Legacy ==
The following road is named after DesBarres:

- Des Barres St., Sydney, Nova Scotia

== See also ==
- Military history of Nova Scotia
- List of cartographers

Political offices
New office Separated from Nova Scotia	Lieutenant Governor of Cape Breton Island; 1787–1815	Succeeded by William Macarmick
