= Clerbaud Bergier =

Canadian businessman

Clerbaud Bergier (fl. 1680–85) was a Huguenot trader and an early figure in the economic development of Acadia.

Bergier wanted to form a company to engage in fishing and trading in Acadia. In 1682 he was part of a group that started Le Compagnie de la Pêche Sédentaire ou Compagnie d'Acadie (The Company of Acadia). A settlement was also part of the plan and he chose Chedabouctou because of the favourable conditions at that location.

On 10 April 1684, he was appointed the king's lieutenant in Acadia. Soon after this time, he disappeared from records and was replaced as lieutenant.
