= Chedabucto Bay =

Bay on the coast of Nova Scotia, Canada

Coordinates: 45°23′33.59″N 61°18′13.36″W

Chedabucto Bay in Nova Scotia

Chedabucto Bay /ˌʃɛdəˈbʌktoʊ/ is a large bay on the eastern coast of mainland Nova Scotia between the Atlantic Ocean and the Strait of Canso next to Guysborough County. At the entrance to Chedabucto Bay is the community of Canso at the head is the community of Guysborough and on the other end is the town of Mulgrave.

== Geography ==
Chedabucto Bay was formed by the drowning of part of an ancient river system and owes its origin and shape to position of the Chedabucto Fault, which runs across central Nova Scotia from the Bay of Fundy to the Canso peninsula.

== History ==
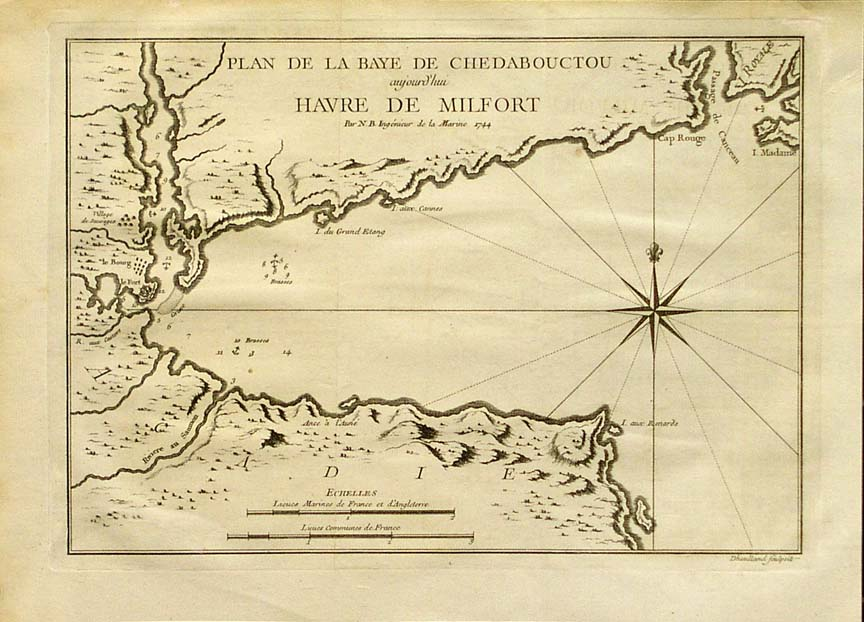
1744 map of Chedabucto Bay

=== Colonial ===
Merchants in La Rochelle, France enjoyed a fishing monopoly in Acadia and formed the Company of Acadia which established a small fortification on Chedabucto Bay named Fort St. Louis. The principal ports were at Chedabucto, which accounted for fifty fishers in 1686. In 1690, Captain Cyprian Southack proceeded to Chedabucto to take Fort St. Louis at the present-day village of Guysborough which, unlike Port-Royal, put up a fight before surrendering.< The company encountered a variety of difficulties on the way to its final disappearance in 1702.

=== Modern ===
On Wednesday, February 4, 1970 the Liberian-registered tanker Arrow ran aground on Cerberus Rock with a cargo of 108,000 barrels (17,200 m^{3}) barrels of Bunker C fuel and split in two. A large oil spill contaminated the waters of the bay as well as 190 miles (310 km) of the 375 statute miles (604 km) shoreline. However, ever since the oil was largely cleaned up by both Human cleanup crews and natural processes, the sunk Tanker has proven to be largely positive for the local wildlife- providing sanctuary for many sea creatures and a home for a vast variety of aquatic plant life.

== Notable people ==
- Pearleen Oliver was born near the bay, in 1917

== See also ==
- Cook's Cove
