= Jeddore =

Jeddore may refer to:

- Jeddore (surname)
- Jeddore Oyster Pond, Nova Scotia
- East Jeddore, Nova Scotia
- Head of Jeddore, Nova Scotia
- West Jeddore, Nova Scotia
- Jeddore, Nova Scotia
