= Jeddore, Nova Scotia =

Jeddore
- Unincorporated community
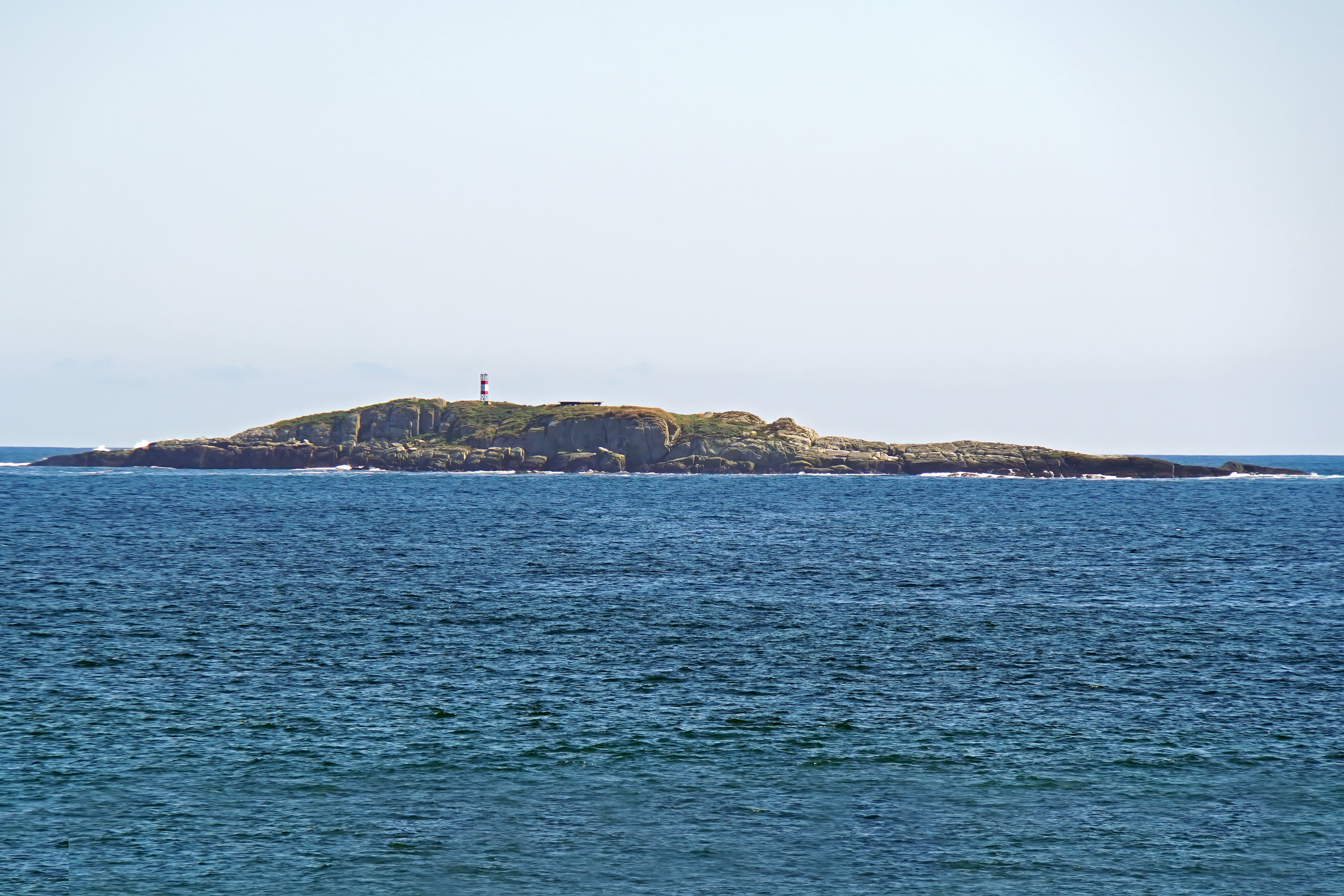
- Jeddore Rock Lighthouse, located at the mouth of Jeddore Harbour

- Location in Nova Scotia
- Coordinates: 44°46′44″N 63°04′44″W
- Country: Canada
- Province: Nova Scotia
- County: Halifax County

Jeddore is a Canadian rural community in Nova Scotia's Halifax Regional Municipality. The community itself comprises several smaller communities. Often the inner communities are referred to on their own but much of the time simply the encapsulating region of Jeddore is simply used. This is most likely due to the size of the communities; individually, they are relatively unknown to residents outside of Nova Scotia's Eastern Shore.

Jeddore is located on the Eastern Shore along Trunk 7, also known as the Marine Drive.

== Communities ==
The area of Jeddore comprises the following four communities:

- East Jeddore
- Head of Jeddore
- Jeddore Oyster Pond
- West Jeddore

== History ==
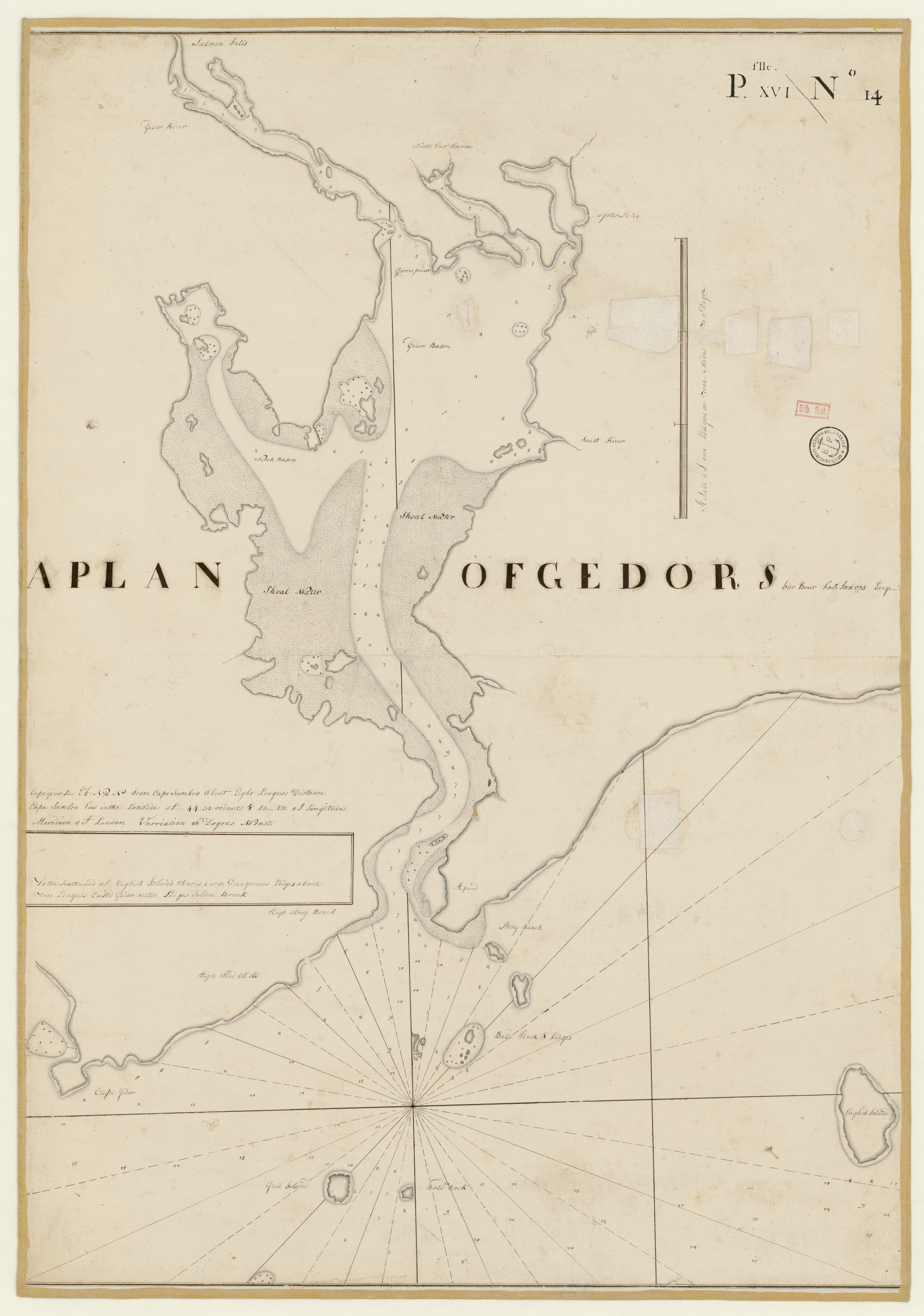
The harbour of Jeddore in 1775.

Jeddore was originally known as "River of Theodore". It was given this name by the French explorer, Nicolas Denys who visited the area in 1672. The name eventually became known as Jeddore.

=== Battle at Winnepang (Jeddore Harbour) ===
During the Mi’kmaq and Maliseet War, in July 1722 the Abenaki made an effort to create a blockade of the capital of Nova Scotia Annapolis Royal. They captured 18 fishing vessels along with prisoners between present-day Yarmouth and Canso. They also captured vessels and took prisoners from the Bay of Fundy.

Governor Richard Philipps commissioned Capt. John Eliot and Capt. John Robinson in two sloops with regiments to protect the fishery at Canso, Nova Scotia and retrieve the captured vessels and prisoners. Toward this end, Capt. Eliot made a surprise attack on forty Natives on a ship at present-day Jeddore Harbour. The natives were among six of the fishing vessels they had seized. There was a 30-minute battle. Capt. Eliot was badly wounded as were several of his men. One was killed. Then Capt. Eliot lobbed hand granadoes (original spelling of hand grenade) into the native vessel. Some natives were killed in the explosion. Others tried to swim ashore as they were being shot by the New Englanders. Thirty-five Natives were killed. The New Englanders managed to rescue fifteen prisoners from the vessels, while discovering that nine had been killed.^{A}

Captain Robinson captured two of the vessels and killed numerous Maine natives. He then arrived at present-day Lunenburg, Nova Scotia where the natives held five of the fishing vessels along with twenty prisoners. Robinson paid a ransom and they were released.

=== Attack at Jeddore ===
During Father Le Loutre's War, on the night of April 21, under the leadership of Chief Jean-Baptiste Cope and the Mi'kmaq attacked another British schooner in a battle at sea off Jeddore, Nova Scotia. On board were nine British men and one Acadian (Casteel), who was the pilot. The Mi'kmaq killed and scalped the British and let the Acadian off at Port Toulouse, where the Mi'kmaq sank the schooner after looting it.

== Geography ==
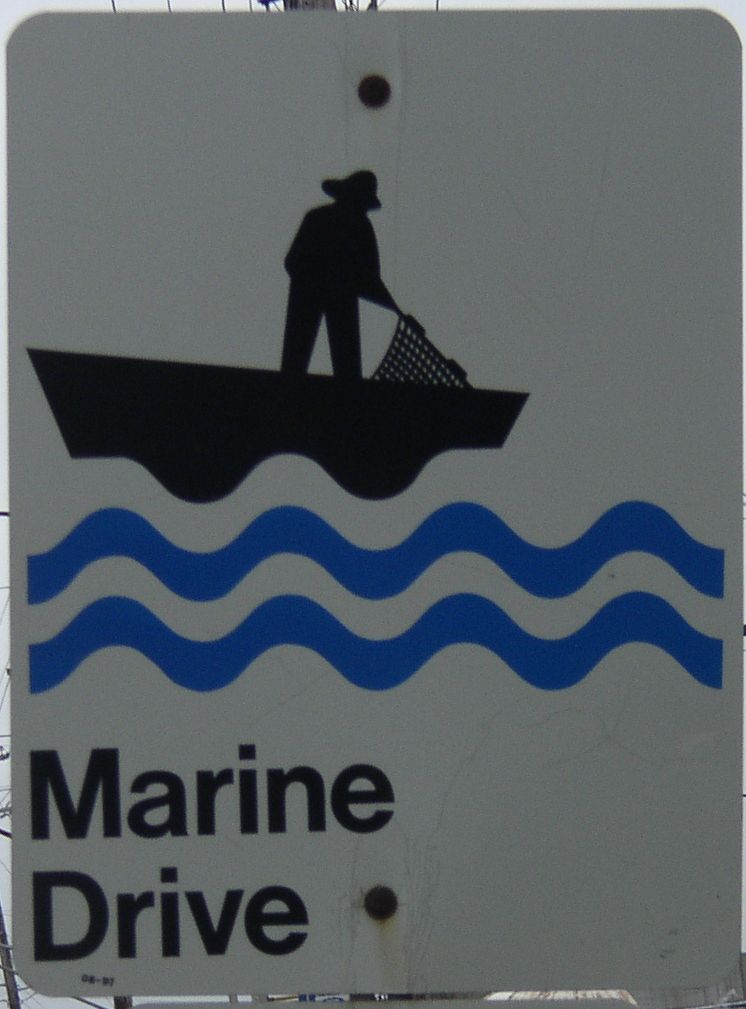
On Marine Drive

The area of Jeddore surrounds a deep natural harbour and while inland, it is dotted by various lakes and drumlins.

=== Jeddore Harbour ===
Jeddore Harbour lies in the center of the communities of Jeddore with East, West and Head Jeddore lying in their respective directions from the sea. Jeddore Oyster Ponds Lies to the northwest and Myers Point peninsula juts out at the head. The inlet is 11 kilometres (6.8 mi) long and 5 kilometres (3.1 mi) wide.

The harbour is fed by Salmon River from the north. Salmon River which is actually a semi-saltwater fjord, which is spring fed but becomes increasingly contaminated by the sea water as it deepens and opens to the bay (eastern arm of the harbour).

== Economy ==
The fishing industry remains the most important part of the economy in the area. Seafood processing factors highly into the economy with lobster making up the greatest proportion of fish exported directly from the area itself.

The area is home to five seafood processing plants:

- Bakers Point Fisheries Limited
- Blue Ocean Sea Products Limited
- Classic Seafoods
- Jack's Lobsters Limited
- Jeddore Seafoods Limited

== Notes ==
1.^{A} Plank states that New Englanders set fire to Mi'kmaq vessels. The warriors tried to swim to land, but the New England men fired on them in the water. Twenty two were reported killed. Only five bodies were recovered and the New Englanders decapitated the corpses and set the severed heads on pikes surrounding Canso's new fort. Murdoch's and Plank's versions differ slightly.
