= 1744 =

1744 in various calendars
- Gregorian calendar: 1744; MDCCXLIV
- Ab urbe condita: 2497
- Armenian calendar: 1193; ԹՎ ՌՃՂԳ
- Assyrian calendar: 6494
- Balinese saka calendar: 1665–1666
- Bengali calendar: 1150–1151
- Berber calendar: 2694
- British Regnal year: 17 Geo. 2 – 18 Geo. 2
- Buddhist calendar: 2288
- Burmese calendar: 1106
- Byzantine calendar: 7252–7253
- Chinese calendar: 癸亥年 (Water Pig); 4441 or 4234 — to — 甲子年 (Wood Rat); 4442 or 4235
- Coptic calendar: 1460–1461
- Discordian calendar: 2910
- Ethiopian calendar: 1736–1737
- Hebrew calendar: 5504–5505
- Hindu calendars
- Vikram Samvat: 1800–1801
- Shaka Samvat: 1665–1666
- Kali Yuga: 4844–4845
- Holocene calendar: 11744
- Igbo calendar: 744–745
- Iranian calendar: 1122–1123
- Islamic calendar: 1156–1157
- Japanese calendar: Kanpō 4 / Enkyō 1 (延享元年)
- Javanese calendar: 1668–1669
- Julian calendar: Gregorian minus 11 days
- Korean calendar: 4077
- Minguo calendar: 168 before ROC 民前168年
- Nanakshahi calendar: 276
- Thai solar calendar: 2286–2287
- Tibetan calendar: ཆུ་མོ་ཕག་ལོ་ (female Water-Boar); 1870 or 1489 or 717 — to — ཤིང་ཕོ་བྱི་བ་ལོ་ (male Wood-Rat); 1871 or 1490 or 718

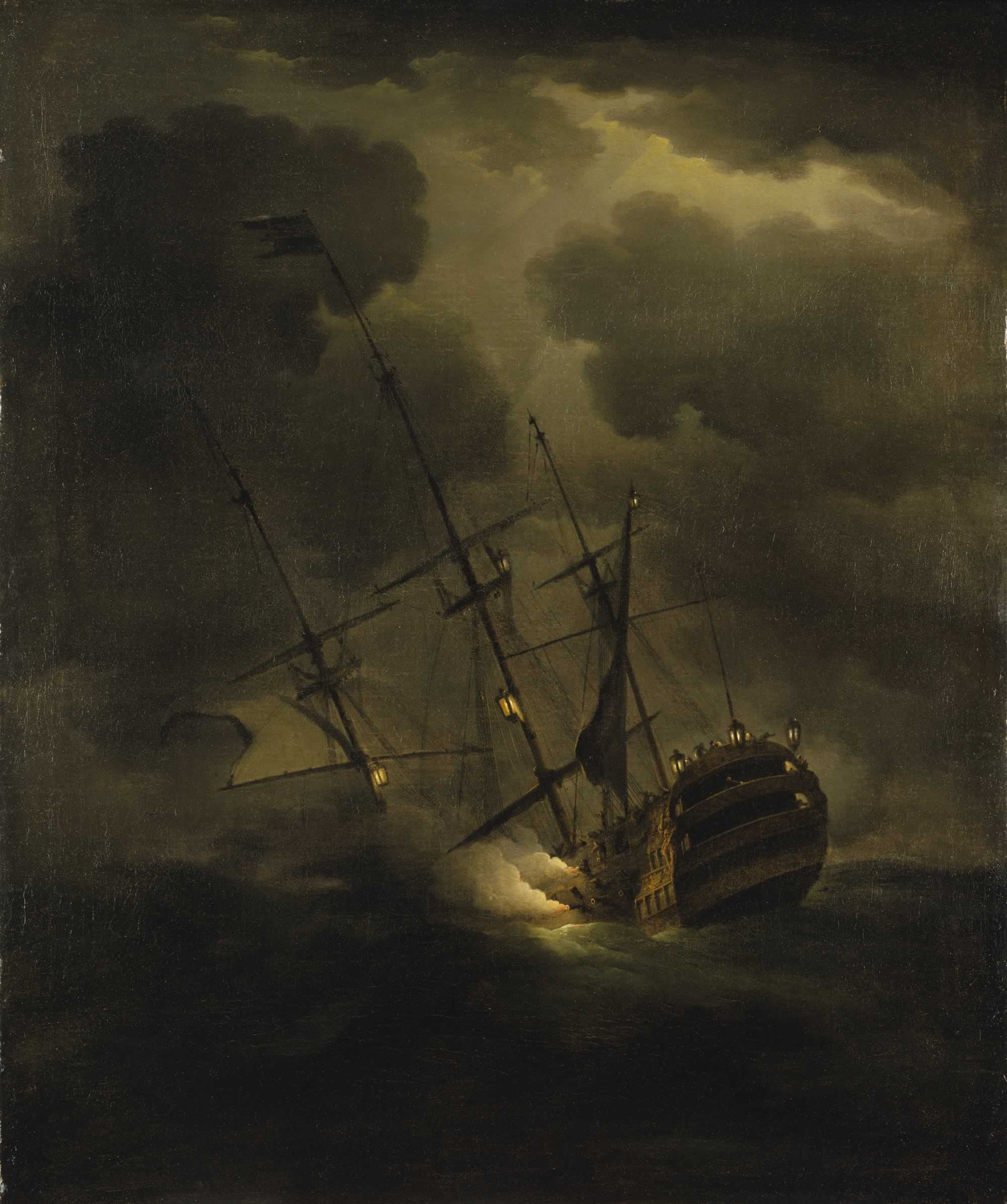
October 4: HMS Victory sinks in the English Channel, killing 1,150 people.

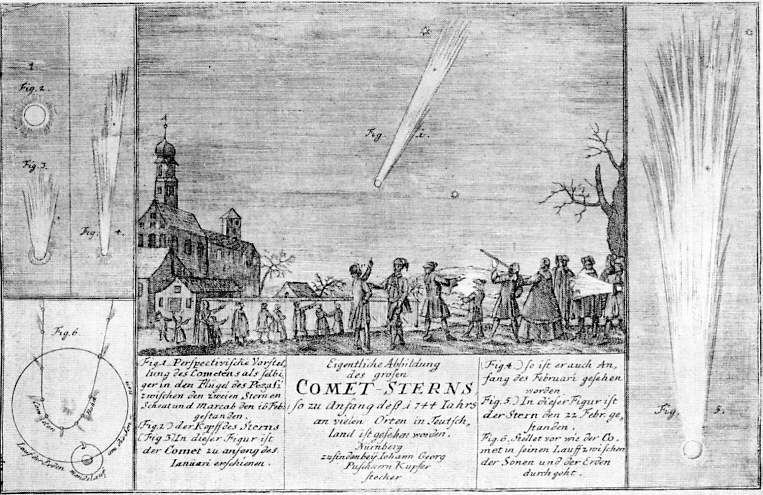
February 16: The Great Comet of 1744 is visible in the skies over Europe.

1744 (MDCCXLIV) was a leap year starting on Wednesday of the Gregorian calendar and a leap year starting on Sunday of the Julian calendar, the 1744th year of the Common Era (CE) and Anno Domini (AD) designations, the 744th year of the 2nd millennium, the 44th year of the 18th century, and the 5th year of the 1740s decade. As of the start of 1744, the Gregorian calendar was 11 days ahead of the Julian calendar, which remained in localized use until 1923.

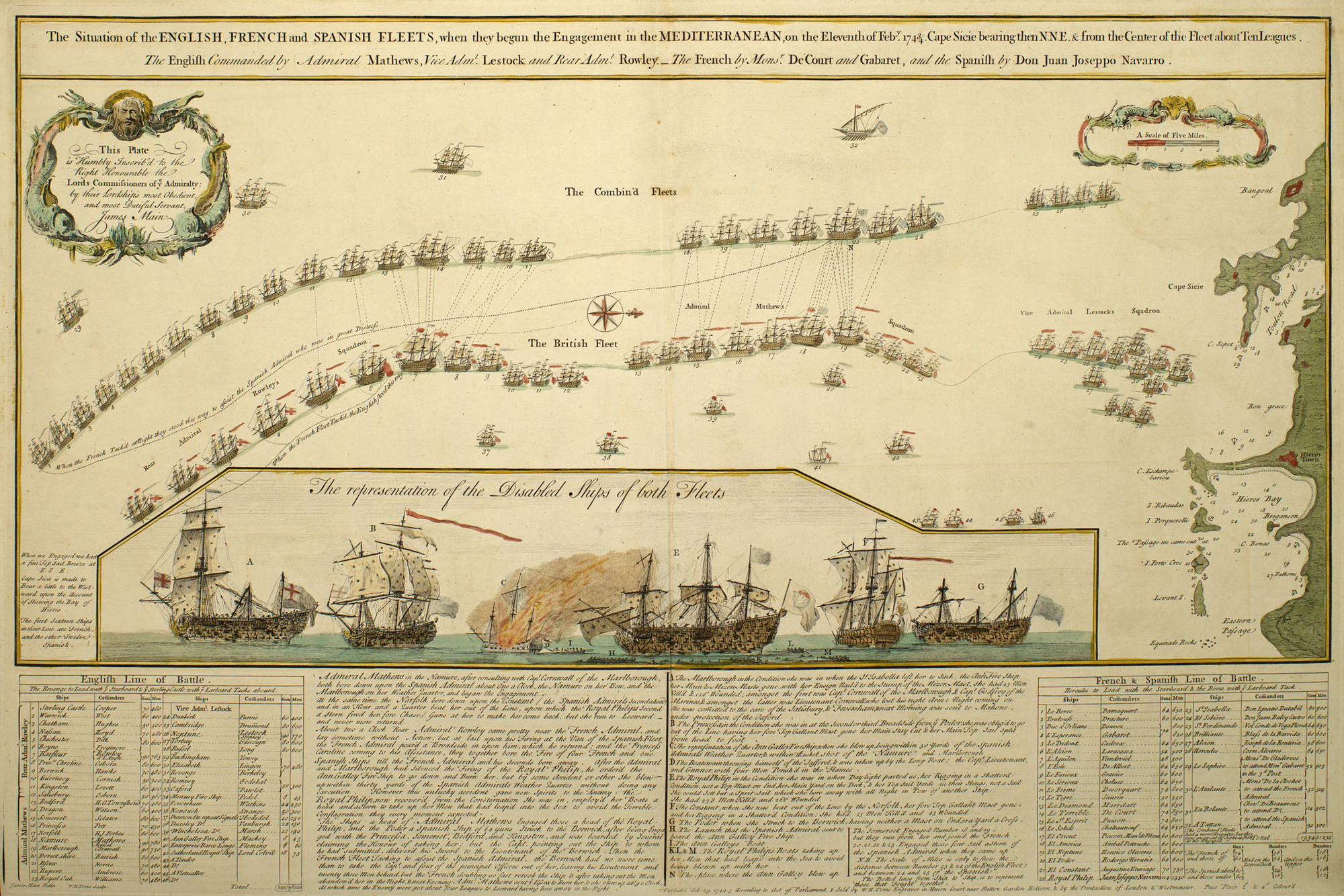
February 23: A Franco-Spanish fleet engages a British fleet at the Battle of Toulon

== Events ==
=== January–March ===
- January 6 – The Royal Navy ship Bacchus engages the Spanish Navy privateer Begona, and sinks it; 90 of the 120 Spanish sailors die, but 30 of the crew are rescued.
- January 24 – The Dagohoy rebellion in the Philippines begins, with the killing of Father Giuseppe Lamberti.
- February 22–23 – Battle of Toulon: A British fleet fights a Franco-Spanish fleet; the battle is tactically inconclusive but results in a strategic success for the allies.
- February 27 – Violent storms frustrate a planned French invasion of Britain.
- March 1 (approximately) – The Great Comet of 1744, one of the brightest ever seen, reaches perihelion.
- March 13 – The British ship Betty capsizes and sinks off of the Gold Coast (modern-day Ghana) near Anomabu. More than 200 people on board die, although there are a few survivors.
- March 15 – France declares war on Great Britain.

=== April–June ===
- April – The Female Spectator (a monthly) is founded by Eliza Haywood in England, the first periodical written for women by a woman.
- April 2 – The first Rules of golf are drawn up at Leith, for the first golf competition.
- April 27 – Siege of Villafranca (1744): A joint French and Spanish force defeats Britain and Sardinia.
- May 11 – Russia's treasury begins an effort to reduce the number of copper five-kopeck pieces (20 of which equal a Russian ruble) by declaring that it will buy them back at a ruble for every 20 until August 1, after which kopecks would be redeemed at a ruble for every 25; then at the rate of 33 for a ruble on October 1, and 50 for a ruble on and after August 28, 1746.
- May 22 – The Union of Germany is proclaimed in Frankfurt Frederick II of Prussia, as articles of union are signed between Prussia, Hesse-Kassel and the Rhineland Palatinate.
- May 24 – After receiving the news from Europe that Great Britain and France are at war, the French Army at Louisbourg attacks the British settlement at Fort William Augustus at Canso, Nova Scotia and forces its surrender.
- June 13 – Alexey Bestuzhev-Ryumin is named as the new Chancellor of the Russian Empire by the Empress Elizabeth.
- June 15 – Commodore George Anson's voyage around the world concludes after four years as HMS Centurion returns to England at Spithead and Anson is greeted as a hero.
- June 28 – At the age of 15, Princess Sophie of Anhalt-Zerbst, the future Empress of Russia, is received into the Russian Orthodox Church after converting from the Lutheran faith. Upon her conversion to the Russian Orthodox religion, she is given the name Yekaterina (Catherine). In 1762, she takes the throne as the Empress Catherine II, later known as Catherine the Great.

=== July–September ===
- July 8 – The Royal Navy privateer Somerset capsizes and sinks in the Bristol Channel, killing 86 of the 97 crew.
- July 19 – Battle of Casteldelfino: France defeats the Kingdom of Sardinia.
- July 29 – Nader Shah lays siege to the Ottoman citadel of Kars.
- August 12 – Battle of Velletri in the Kingdom of Naples: Spanish-Neapolitan forces defeat those of the Archduchy of Austria.
- September 30 – Battle of Madonna dell'Olmo: France and Spain defeat the Kingdom of Sardinia.

=== October–December ===
- October 4 – In one of the greatest disasters for the Royal Navy, HMS Victory sinks in a storm in the English Channel, killing 1,100 sailors and officers it had been bringing back from Gibraltar to England, including Admiral John Balchen. The wreck will be located 264 years later, in January, 2009.
- October 12 – The creator of binomial nomenclature for the identification of plant and animal species, Carl Linnaeus, is selected as president of the Royal Swedish Academy of Science, succeeding the late Anders Celsius, who had devised the centigrade measurement of temperature.
- October 19 – William Shirley, the British colonial Governor of the Province of Massachusetts Bay, announces the declaration of war against the Miꞌkmaq and Maliseet Indian tribes.
- October 25
  - The Massachusetts General Court, colonial legislature for the Massachusetts Bay Province, approves an incentive for the killing of enemy Indians, authorizing the payment of 100 Massachusetts pounds for the scalping of a Mi'kmaq or Maliseet Indian, and 50 for the scalps of women or children.
  - Spanish explorers Antonio de Ulloa and Jorge Juan y Santacilla complete their mission of exploration and depart from the Peruvian seaport of Callao for a return to Spain.
- November 1 – Second Silesian War: The Prussian Army, under the command of Field Marshal Kurt Christoph Graf von Schwerin, begins the bombardment of Prague. The Bohemian capital surrenders after two weeks.
- December 18 – Queen Maria Theresa of Austria issues a proclamation to rid Bohemia of its Jewish residents, with the Jews to leave Prague over the next two weeks, and then to depart from Bohemia entirely in 1745.

=== Date unknown ===
- The third French and Indian War, known as King George's War, breaks out at Annapolis Royal, Nova Scotia.
- Tommy Thumb's Pretty Song Book, sequel to Tommy Thumb's Song Book, containing the oldest version of many well-known and popular rhymes, is published in London.

== Births ==
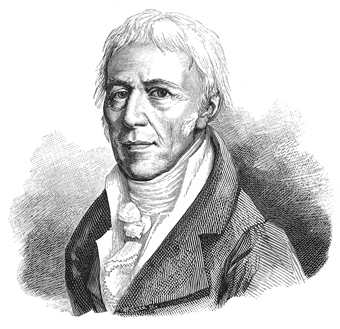
Jean-Baptiste Lamarck

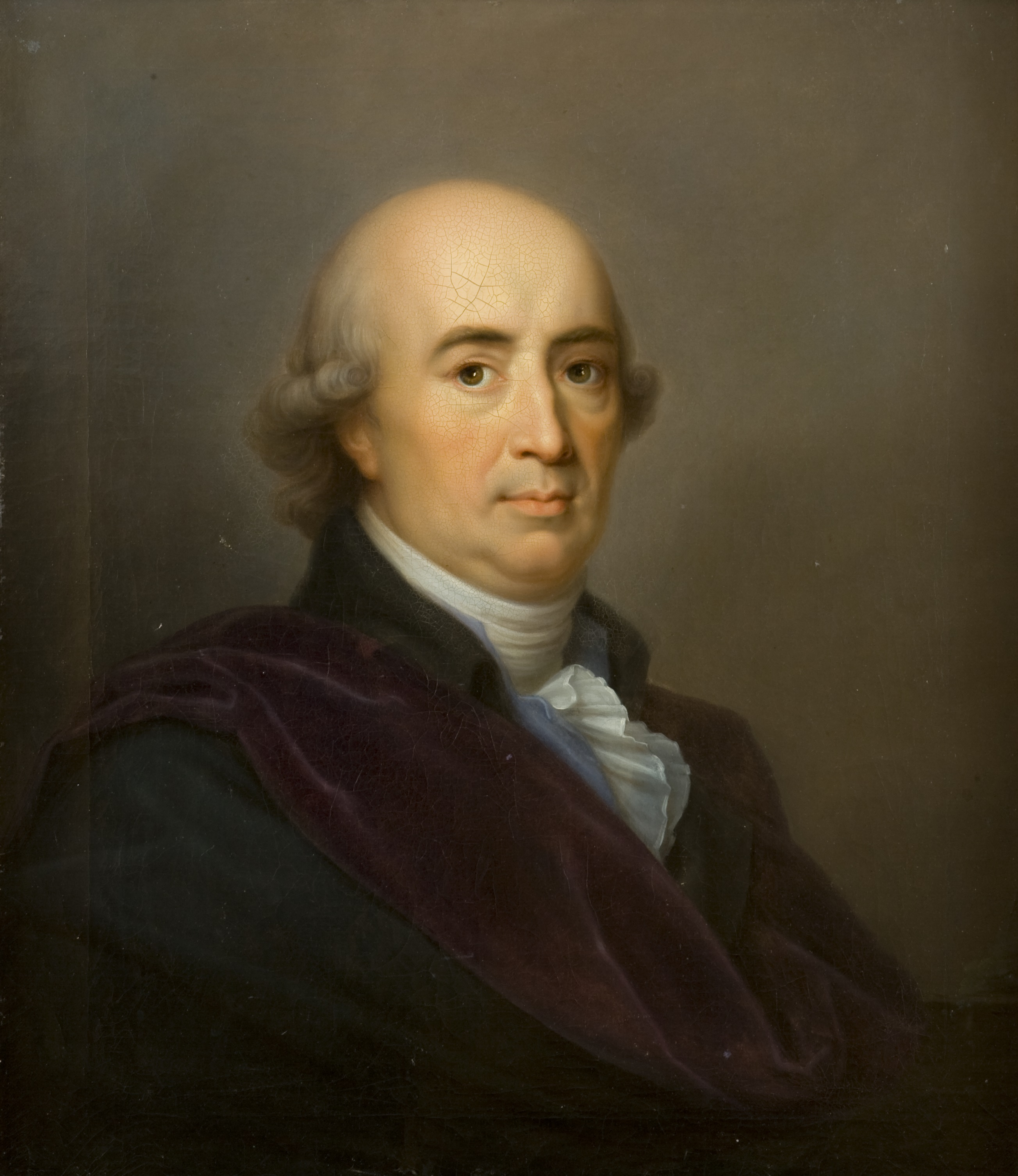
Johann Gottfried Herder

- February 6 – Pierre-Joseph Desault, French anatomist and surgeon (d. 1795)
- February 23 – Mayer Amschel Rothschild, German banker, founder of the Rothschild banking dynasty (d. 1812)
- May 19 – Charlotte of Mecklenburg-Strelitz, queen of George III (d. 1818)
- May 21 – Samuel Ireland, British author and engraver (d. 1800)
- May 31 – Richard Lovell Edgeworth, Anglo-Irish politician, writer and inventor (d. 1817)
- July 20 – Joshua Clayton, American politician (d. 1798)
- August 1 – Jean-Baptiste Lamarck, French naturalist (d. 1829)
- August 16 – Pierre Méchain, French astronomer (d. 1804)
- August 25 – Johann Gottfried Herder, German writer (d. 1803)
- September 25 – King Frederick William II of Prussia (d. 1797)
- October 13 – Henrik Johan Nauckhoff, Swedish admiral
- date unknown
  - Marie Barch, Danish ballerina (d. 1827)
  - Marie-Louise-Adélaïde Boizot, French engraver (d. 1800)

== Deaths ==
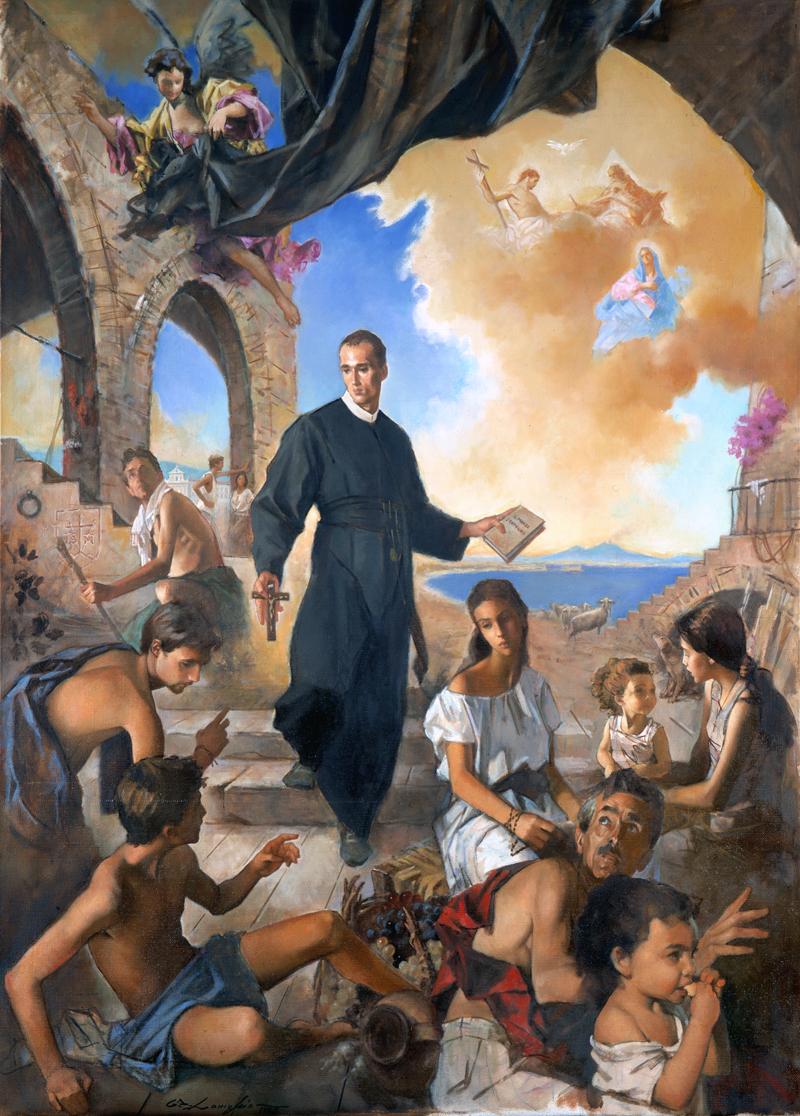
Blessed Januarius Maria Sarnelli

- January 11 – James Hamilton, 7th Earl of Abercorn (b. 1686)
- January 22 – Pierre Lepature, French artist (b. 1659)
- January 23 – Giambattista Vico, Italian philosopher and historian (b. 1668)
- January 26 – Ludwig Andreas von Khevenhüller, Austrian field marshal (b. 1683)
- February 11 – Hedvig Taube, mistress to King Frederick I of Sweden (b. 1714)
- February 14 – John Hadley, English mathematician (b. 1682)
- March 3 – Jean Barbeyrac, French jurist (b. 1674)
- March 4 – John Anstis, English herald (b. 1669)
- April 25 – Anders Celsius, Swedish astronomer (b. 1701)
- May 25 – Charles Edzard, Prince of East Frisia (b. 1716)
- May 30 – Alexander Pope, English writer (b. 1688)
- June 29
  - André Campra, French composer (b. 1660)
  - John Eames, English academic (b. 1686)
- June 30 – Januarius Maria Sarnelli, Italian Roman Catholic priest and blessed (b. 1702)
- July – Mihai Racoviță, Prince of Moldavia and Prince of Wallachia (b. c. 1660)
- August 9 – James Brydges, 1st Duke of Chandos, English patron of the arts (b. 1673)
- August 13 – John Cruger, Dutch-born Mayor of New York (b. 1678)
- August 26 – William Byrd II, prominent planter from Virginia (b. 1674)
- September 28 – Princess Thérèse of France, daughter of Louis XV (b. 1736)
- October 10 – Johann Heinrich Schulze, German professor and polymath (b. 1687)
- October 18 – Sarah Churchill, Duchess of Marlborough, English friend of Anne, Queen of Great Britain (b. 1660)
- October 31 – Leonardo Leo, Italian composer (b. 1694)
- December 8 – Marie Anne de Mailly-Nesle, French mistress of King Louis XV (b. 1717)
- December 23 – Élisabeth Charlotte d'Orléans, duchess and regent of Lorraine (b. 1676)
- date unknown – Catherine Jérémie, French-Canadian botanist (b. 1644)
