= Jeddore (surname) =

Family name

Jeddore is a L'nu (Mi'kmaq) surname, that has also led to placenames in the Canadian provinces of Nova Scotia and Newfoundland and Labrador.

== History ==
The earliest instance of the surname Jeddore known to date is Kji-Saqamaw We'jitu Isidore, (circa 1656-1769). (Saqamaw means "Chief"; Kji-Saqamaw means "Grand Chief").

The contemporary surname Isidore may also be related to Kji-Saqamaw We'jitu Isidore.

== People ==
People commonly known by their family name Jeddore (in rare instances written as Jedor(e), Ledor(e), Geodol, Gietol and Gadole, include:

- Noel Jeddore (1810 - 1898)
- Joseph Jeddore (Abt. 1866 - April 11, 1956)
- John Denny Jeddore (August 1887 - October 14, 1953)
- Peter Jeddore (May 9, 1892 - May 18, 1970)
- Saqamaw Noel Jeddore (December 18, 1865 - May 14, 1944)
- Victor Jeddore (August 11, 1907 - July 7, 1977)
- Lawrence Jeddore (November 4, 1922 - 1998)
- We'jitu Jeddore (AKA We'jitu Isidore, c. 1656 - c. 1769), grand chief of the Mi'kmaq of the provinces of New Brunswick, Newfoundland and Labrador, Nova Scotia and Quebec.

== Locations carrying the Jeddore name ==
- East Jeddore, Nova Scotia
- West Jeddore, Nova Scotia
- Jeddore Oyster Pond, Nova Scotia
- Head of Jeddore, Nova Scotia
- Jeddore Lake, Newfoundland and Labrador

== See also ==
- Jeddore (disambiguation)
