= Battle of Winnepang =

1722 battle

Coordinates: 44°46′32″N 63°03′19″W

- Part of Dummer's War
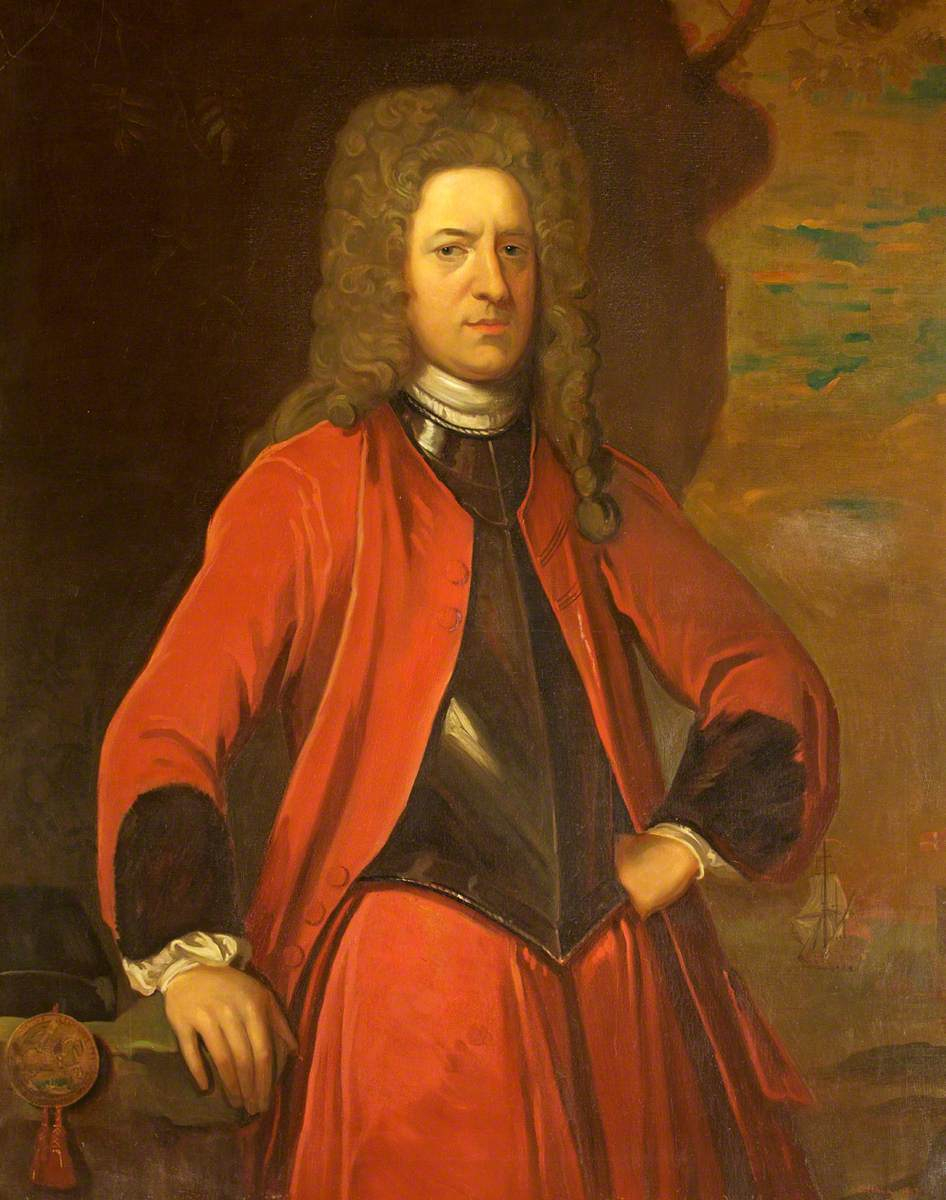
- Richard Philipps, Governor of Nova Scotia and Commander of the 40th Regiment of Foot
| Date | July 1722 |
| Location | Jeddore Harbour, Nova Scotia |
| Result | British victory |

Belligerents
| New England colonists | Mi'kmaq |

Commanders and leaders
| John Bradstreet; John Elliot (WIA) | Unknown |

Strength
| ~30 militia | 39 warriors |

Casualties and losses
| 5 killed several wounded | 35 killed |

The Battle of Winnepang occurred during Dummer's War when New England forces attacked Mi'kmaq at present day Jeddore Harbour, Nova Scotia. (Note: Murdoch (1865), p. 399, names the site of the battle site as "Winnepang". Rev. Silas Rand (1875), p. 90, states Jeddore was called "Wineboogwechk", which is likely a corruption of Winnepang. The place name Wineboogwĕchk' and the descriptive of "to flow roughly" translates to winpĕgitk or winpĕgijooik, that is, Winnepang; also see Bruce Furguson. Place-Names and Places of Nova Scotia. Nova Scotia Archives. p. 314).) The naval battle was part of a campaign ordered by Governor Richard Philipps to retrieve over 82 New England prisoners taken by the Mi'kmaq in fishing vessels off the coast of Nova Scotia. (Note: The minimum of 82 New England prisoners is calculated by adding up the number of prisoners retrieved and those who were known to have been killed or taken elsewhere.) The New England force was led by Ensign John Bradstreet (Note: Cousin of John Bradstreet, who was later imprisoned at Louisbourg.) and fishing Captain John Elliot.

== Historical context ==
Dummer's War occurred as a result of an expansion of British settlements along the Kennebec River (in present-day Maine) and of the movement of more New England fishermen into Nova Scotia waters (particularly at Canso, Nova Scotia). The Treaty of Utrecht (1713), which ended Queen Anne's War, had facilitated this expansion. The treaty, however, had been signed in Europe and had not involved any tribes of the Wabanaki Confederacy. None had been consulted and they protested through raids on British fishermen and settlements. In response to Wabanaki hostilities toward the expansion, the Governor of Nova Scotia Richard Philipps built a fort in traditional Mi'kmaq territory at Canso in 1720 and Massachusetts Governor Shute built forts on traditional Abenaki territory at the mouth of the Kennebec River. (Note: The French claimed the same territory on the Kennebec River by building churches in the Abenaki villages of Norridgewock and Medoctec further up the Kennebec River.) The construction of these fortifications raised tensions which in 1722 spilled into open warfare.

In July, the Abenaki and Mi'kmaq blockaded the capital of Nova Scotia Annapolis Royal in an attempt to starve it out. They captured 18 fishing vessels along with prisoners between present-day Cape Sable and Canso. They also captured vessels and took prisoners on the Bay of Fundy. One of the captured vessels had been dispatched from Canso to Annapolis Royal by Governor Philipps and contained a year supply of provisions for the capital. The Maliseet seized another vessel and used it to transport 45 warriors up the bay to join with 120 Mi'kmaq from Shubenacadie and Cape Sable in preparation to march against Annapolis Royal. In response, to protect the capital from native attack and secure the release of the New England prisoners, Lieutenant Governor John Doucett took 22 Mi'kmaq hostage at Annapolis Royal. Soon after the blockade began, Massachusetts Governor Shute declared war on the Wabanaki Confederacy. (Lieutenant Governor William Dummer, after whom the war is named, took the position of Acting Governor in 1723.)

== Battle ==
Immediately after the declaration of war, on July 22, Governor Philipps commissioned Capt. John Elliot and Capt. John Robinson in two sloops with regiments to protect the fishery at Canso and retrieve the New England prisoners. There was a Mi'kmaq camping place near Canso at present-day West Jeddore. There were 39 natives at Winnepang (present-day Jeddore Harbour) who were holding prisoners in 7 vessels. Captains Elliot and Bradstreet arrived in the harbour and attacked the natives in a two-hour naval battle. Bradstreet led a boarding party that overwhelmed the natives with hand grenades and disciplined fire. The New Englanders had five men killed and several injured, including a badly wounded Capt. Elliot.

As the Mi'kmaq tried to swim ashore to escape, the New Englanders opened fire on them. 35 Natives were killed. The New Englanders managed to rescue 15 prisoners from the vessels, while discovering that 9 had been killed. (Note: Murdoch (1865), p. 399; Plank (2001), p. 78, also recounts the battle at Jeddore Harbour. He states that New Englanders set fire to Mi'kmaq vessels. The warriors tried to swim to land, but the New England men fired on them in the water. 22 were reported killed. Only five bodies were recovered and the New Englanders decapitated the corpses and set the severed heads on pikes surrounding Canso's new fort. Murdoch's and Plank's versions differ slightly.)

Only about five natives survived the battle, and when the bodies of the roughly 30 native casualties were recovered from the battle the New Englanders decapitated the corpses, setting the severed heads on spikes surrounding Canso's new fort. (Note: Plank (2001), p. 78; Grenier (2008), p. 60 reports that only five natives survived and that all were wounded. He reports that two Mi'kmaq heads were place on spikes at Canso.)

== Aftermath ==
Elsewhere in the campaign to retrieve the New England prisoners, James Blinn negotiated a prisoner exchange at Canso and won the release of 24 fishermen. Blinn later kidnapped another three or four natives at Cape Sable Island.

In Captain Robinson's expedition, he captured ten of the vessels and killed three Abenaki. Robinson warned the Mi'kmaq not to harm the New England prisoners because they still had Mi'kmaq hostages at Annapolis Royal. He then arrived at Malagash harbour where the natives held five of the fishing vessels along with twenty prisoners. Robinson paid a ransom and they were released.

Captain Cyprian Southack killed one Mi'kmaq and took another five as prisoners off the Gut of Canso.

The Natives had sent sixteen prisoners to present-day Richibucto, New Brunswick.

== Bibliography ==
- Dickason, Olive Patricia. Canada's First Nations: A History of Founding Peoples from Earliest Times. (See Dickason, "Louisbourg and the Indians", p. 77; Dickason, "La guerre navale des Micmacs contre les Britanniques", p. 244). Toronto: McClelland and Stewart, 1992.
- Faragher, John Mack (2005). A Great and Noble Scheme: The Tragic Story of the Expulsion of the French Acadians from Their American Homeland. W.W Norton & Company. ISBN 978-0-393-05135-3.
- Murdoch, Beamish (1865). A History of Nova-Scotia, Or Acadie. Vol. I. Halifax: J. Barnes.
- Gesner, Abraham (1847). New Brunswick: With Notes for Emigrants. Comprehending the Early History, an Account of the Indians, Settlement ... London: Simmonds & Ward.
- Grenier, John (2008). The Far Reaches of Empire: War in Nova Scotia, 1710–1760. University of Oklahoma Press. ISBN 978-0-8061-8566-8.
- Griffiths, N.E.S. (2005). From Migrant to Acadian: A North American Border People, 1604-1755. McGill-Queen's University Press. ISBN 978-0-7735-2699-0.
- Penhallow's Indian Wars, p. 92
- Benjamin Church's account
- Plank, Geoffrey (2001). An Unsettled Conquest: The British Campaign Against the Peoples of Acadia. University of Pennsylvania Press. ISBN 978-0-8122-0710-1.
- Rand, Silas Tertius (1875). A First Reading Book in the Micmac Language: Comprising the Micmac Numerals, and the Names of the Different Kinds of Beasts, Birds, Fishes, Trees... Halifax: Nova Scotia Printing Company.
