= Patrick Heron (disambiguation) =

Patrick Heron (1920–1999) was an English artist.

Patrick Heron may also refer to:

- Patrick Heron (died 1761), Scottish politician, MP for Kirkcudbright Stewartry 1727–41
- Patrick Heron (1736–1803), Scottish politician and banker, MP for Kirkcudbright Stewartry 1795–1803
- Patrick Heron (British Army officer) (c. 1690 – c. 1752), British Army officer
- Patrick Heron (author) (1952–2014), Irish writer
