= Richard Murphy (sea captain) =

American sea captain (1838–1916)

Captain Richard "Dick" Murphy
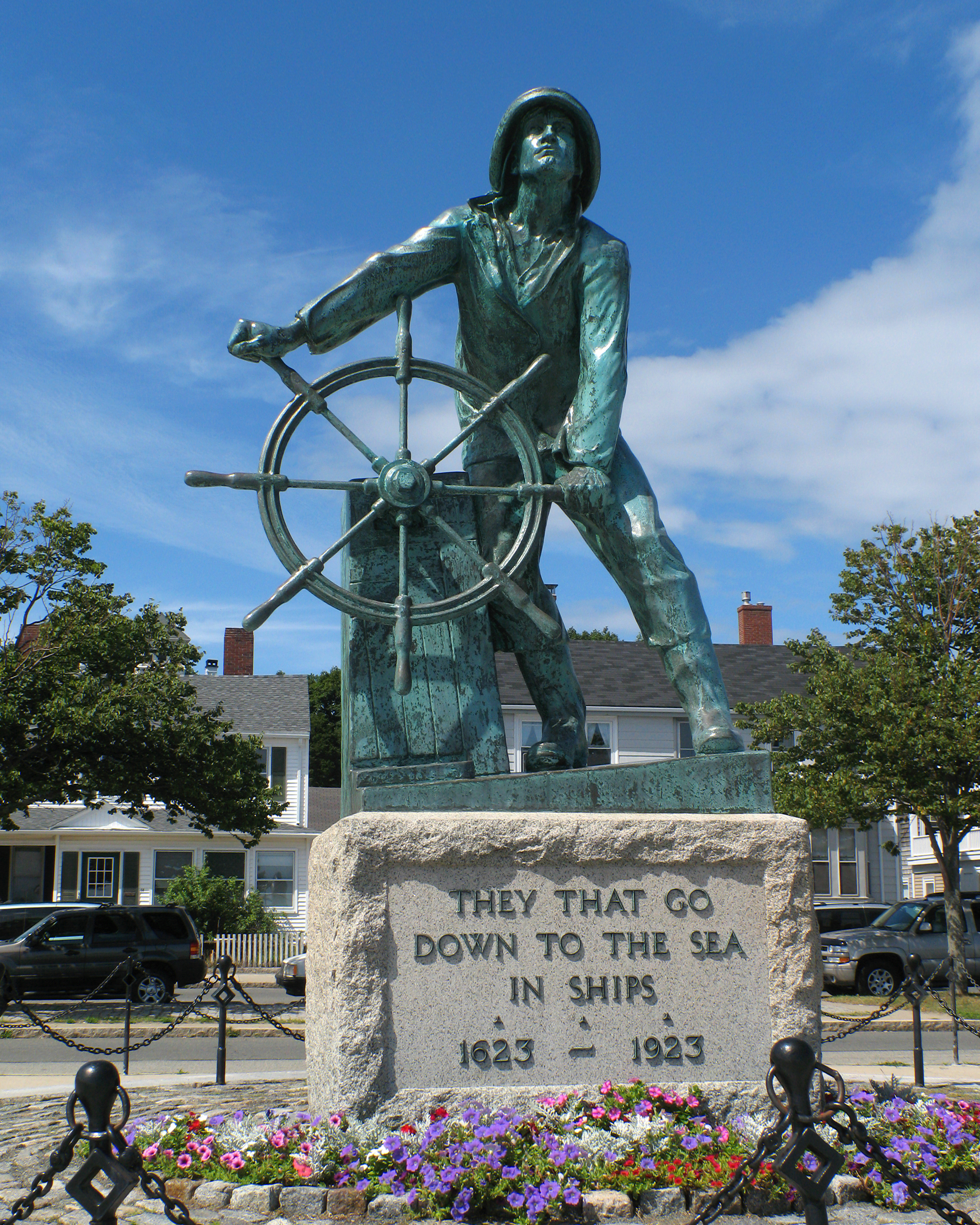
- Fisherman's Memorial; Gloucester, Massachusetts
- Born: September 28, 1838; Canso, Guysborough Co., Nova Scotia, British North America
- Died: February 21, 1916 (aged 77); Dorchester, Boston, Suffolk Co., Massachusetts
- Occupations: Captain, fisherman
- Spouse: Catherine Hearn (1832-1891)
- Children: Alice Gertrude (Murphy) Doyle (1868-1962); Marie Elizabeth (Murphy) Sullivan (1874-1967)

Richard Moses Murphy (1838–1916) was a well-known schooner captain who sailed out of Gloucester, Massachusetts, during the late 19th-century. Some of his experiences as a mariner are detailed in a chapter titled "The Adventures of Captain Richard Murphy" in The Fisherman’s Own Book, published by Proctor Brothers in 1882.

== Early life ==
Murphy was born in or near the fishing village of Canso, Guysborough County, Nova Scotia, British North America on September 28, 1838. His father, Miles Murphy, a laborer, was born in Wexford, Ireland about 1798. His mother, Catherine Henderson (surname changed from Hanrahan), came from Cape George, Antigonish, Nova Scotia. She was born about 1805. Murphy was the third of six children. He came south with his parents and siblings to the fishing port of Gloucester, Essex County, Massachusetts, in the early 1850s.

== Family ==
Murphy married Catherine Hearn, a 32-year-old native of Guysborough, Nova Scotia, in Gloucester on April 26, 1866. The couple had two daughters, Alice Gertude Murphy, born August 13, 1868, and Mary Elizabeth Murphy, born March 31, 1874.

== Career as a Mariner ==
Beginning at a very young age, Murphy served as a crew member on various mackerel schooners sailing out of Gloucester. Two of his brothers, John Murphy and Michael Murphy, were similarly employed in the fishing trade. However, they were lost at sea when the schooner Oconomowoc sank in a gale on February 10, 1862. Their names appear on plaque two (1851-1867) of the Gloucester Fisherman's Memorial. During the late 1850s and 1860s, Murphy crewed various schooners sailing to the fishing grounds in pursuit of cod, halibut, and haddock. These boats included the Queen of Clippers, Hiawatha, Eastern Queen, Glenwood, and J.G. Dennis. Two years after Murphy sailed on her, the J.G. Dennis was lost with all hands. She went down, along with at least five other vessels from the Gloucester fleet, in the intense northeaster of March, 1864. The Hiawatha foundered on Georges Bank in February 1871, with the loss of her entire crew. The Glenwood sank after a collision in 1876 off Highland Light on Cape Cod, but the crew was rescued.

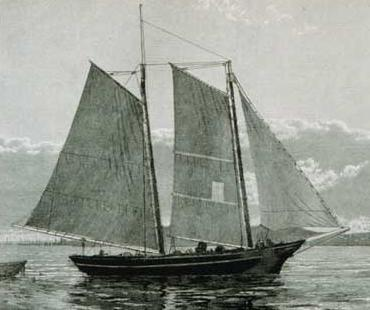
A small fishing schooner typical of those captained by Murphy. Vessels such as this served as the mother ship for smaller dories, from which most of the fishing took place. When not in use, dories were nested inside one another in a stack on the deck of the schooner. Many fishermen were lost at sea on Georges Bank and the Grand Banks when their dories became separated from the schooners to which they belonged.

=== Commands ===
Because Murphy performed well during emergencies at sea and, in part, as a result of his Nova Scotia heritage, his role within the fisheries would not be relegated to that of a dory man or crew member. According to one source of the time:

"The Nova Scotian is numbered among the best class of our fishermen. Bred to the business from early youth, discontented with the inferior craft and methods of his native land, ambitious for greater advantages than are afforded him at home, he prosecutes his calling with a zeal that assures success. If his habits are good and he makes proper use of his opportunities, there is nothing to prevent his rising to the part ownership and command of the vessel in which he sails, and many of the smartest skippers of the fleet are of Nova Scotia birth."

By the early 1870s, Murphy had acquired sufficient experience as a mariner and pilot, that fishing company owners began to place their vessels under his command. These vessels were typically two-masted schooners, informally referred to as "bankers," which generally ranged from 50 to 90 feet in length. Most voyages were to Georges Bank, a broad area of treacherous shoals, rich in marine life, located about 150 miles east of Gloucester. However, Gloucester fishing schooners sometimes traveled as far as the Grand Banks, off Newfoundland, and regularly visited a series of fishing grounds stretching between Cape Cod and waters south of Cape Breton, Nova Scotia. The fishing season would typically begin in earnest in February and would continue until the onset of severe winter cold. Each vessel would take a crew of between eight and twelve men. Each trip, on average, would consume two to three weeks.”

In 1870, Murphy served as skipper of the 49-ton Gloucester-based schooner Oriental, built in 1846. In 1874, Murphy was listed as master of the Essex-built Laughing Water, which weighed 49 tons and was built in 1858. In August 1883, under the command of a subsequent captain, this vessel was severely damaged in a hurricane. According to the New York Times, following this storm, "[t]he schooner Laughing Water succeeded in bringing her hull into port, but that was about all that was left of her." In April 1893, the Laughing Water rescued the surviving crewmembers of the Gloucester schooner Genesta, which capsized off Barnegat, New Jersey. In 1895, the Laughing Water sank without loss of life after it was run down by another vessel.

As captain of the banker David J. Adams, in 1877, Murphy was credited with one of the largest hauls of haddock ever brought into the port of Gloucester, caught over the course of a 10-day trip. In December, 1880, while still in command of the David J. Adams, Murphy came to the aid of a vessel that had been battered by the North Atlantic.

"Boston, [December] 21 - Captain Richard Murphy of the Schooner [David J.] Adams reported that sixteen miles east southeast of Chatham he was boarded by the captain of the barque Fearless, forty days from Battle Harbor, bound for New York. The [vessel] lost two sets of sails, had the bullworks stove, the foretop gallant mast was gone, and she was leaking badly. The crew had been living on the last herring eight days. Captain Murphy furnished eight days provisions and parted company."

The David J. Adams was subsequently seized by Canadian authorities on May 7, 1886, when under the command of a different master. It was then made the subject of extensive international legal proceedings, which lasted for more than three decades.

In 1883, Murphy captained the Gloucester-built schooner Notice. This vessel, completed in 1868, was 71 feet in length, had a beam of 21.6 feet, drew 7.9 feet of water, and weighed 66.5 gross tons. Some five years before Murphy took charge, the Notice had undertaken a round-trip voyage of more than 6,000 nautical miles, from Gloucester to the coast of Norway in search of mackerel. Such long-range expeditions demonstrated the sturdy nature of these tiny ships.

=== Close Calls and Mishaps ===
Murphy was renowned for having narrowly escaped death on many occasions. In 1870, he signed up to do a fishing trip on board the schooner William F. Poole, but backed out at the last moment. The vessel foundered with the loss of all 10 crewmembers. Although he almost certainly could not swim, Murphy fell overboard or was washed overboard at least four times and somehow managed to survive. He also survived at least three falls from the rigging to the deck, two of these resulting in serious injury. One fall was the result of the mainmast fracturing under him while he was aloft. In 1857, he fell approximately 40 feet when a mast hoop he was grasping parted from its base. He partially landed on an oak water barrel. According to The Fisherman's Own Book:

"The blow broke in the head of the barrel, and the back of the unfortunate man was completely flayed and the skin turned up in strips and rolls on his shoulders. In addition to this, his ankle, which had struck on the house when he fell, was out of joint, and altogether his condition was most deplorable. It is easier to imagine than to tell of the dreadful agony endured for twenty-four long hours before light winds carried the vessel to port, where medical treatment could be obtained."

While at sea, Murphy also survived many violent storms. Aboard the 57-ton schooner B.D. Haskins, in waters south of Nova Scotia, he had a harrowing encounter with the destructive category three hurricane of August 24–25, 1873. The vessel was very nearly driven ashore on Sable Island, popularly known as the "Graveyard of the Atlantic." Stripped of her rigging and after having been blasted down to raw wood by wind-driven sand, the B.D. Haskins stayed afloat and eventually managed to limp into Port Hawkesbury, Nova Scotia. Between 223 and 600 people perished in this storm, primarily fishermen from New England and the Maritime Provinces of Canada. The B.D. Haskins later wrecked, on June 1, 1885, two miles south of Nauset Light, without loss of life.

Even in the closing phase of his career, Murphy continued to expose himself to the risks of the offshore fishery. In December 1896, Murphy was sailing on the 91-ton schooner Margaret Mather and suffered a broken leg after being nearly swept overboard by a rogue wave. This same wave snapped the anchor cable and washed away all items not battened down. In November, 1904, Murphy, age 66, was serving as a hand on the small schooner General Hancock during a Pollock run. Skippered by Captain Curzon, the vessel struck a rock ledge and wrecked when entering the harbor at Rockport, Massachusetts. According to the Boston Herald: "One of the Rockport life saving crew saw the predicament of the shipwrecked men, and hastening to the shore, cast off a rope which was fastened to the mainmast, and by means of which the captain and crew, Daniel Keene, Alfred Curzon and Richard Murphy, came to shore hand over hand." While the Atlantic Ocean took the lives of many of his contemporaries, Murphy's own good fortune held steady.

== Later life and death ==
Murphy’s wife, Catherine Henderson Murphy, died on January 3, 1891. On September 19, 1895, while aboard the Gloucester schooner Coquette, which was tied up at Boston, Murphy rescued a woman from a suicide attempt by pulling her from the water. Murphy continued to fish until late in life, retiring about 1905. He continued to live in Gloucester until shortly before his death. However, in 1915 or 1916, he moved in with daughter, Alice Gertrude (Murphy) Doyle, and her family at Geneva Avenue in Dorchester, a few miles south of downtown Boston. Murphy died on February 21, 1916, at City Hospital in Boston, Massachusetts. The cause of death was listed as "senility." He was buried on February 24, 1916, in Oak Hill Cemetery in Gloucester, Massachusetts.
