= Stan Rogers Folk Festival =

Coordinates: 45.3328°N 60.9918°W

- Genre: Folk music World music
- Dates: Last weekend of July
- Locations: Canso, Nova Scotia; Canada
- Years active: 1997–present
- Website: www.stanfest.com

The Stan Rogers Folk Festival, informally known as Stanfest, is an annual music festival held in Canso, Nova Scotia.

Established in 1997 in honour of the late Canadian folk singer and songwriter Stan Rogers, the festival bills itself as "Canada's Songwriter Festival", showcasing Canadian and worldwide grassroots musicians in all genres. The festival has won a number of East Coast Music Awards and attracts over 10,000 music fans each year.

The Stan Rogers Folk Festival takes place on the last weekend of July. The festival was cancelled in 2014, less than a week before it was scheduled to begin, due to the expected arrival of Hurricane Arthur.
