= We'jitu Isidore =

We'jitu Isidore (c. 1656 – c. 1769) was a Kji-Saqamaw ("grand chief") of the Mi'kmaq of the provinces of New Brunswick, Newfoundland and Labrador, Nova Scotia and Quebec.

We'jitu "was a great Indian who died, it is said, aged 113 years. In his young days he saw a vision, and afterwards became the most powerful person in the tribe (a Kinap, with great physical strength). [He] made the men of his tribe great in athletic sports, so that they won from men of other tribes, in competitions. His camping ground was on the east side of First Dartmouth Lake, about half way or so up the lake. [The] name We'jitu apparently related to Isidore and the Indians Jeddore were descendants of his. Noel Jeddore of Halifax [?] was his grandson."
