= Patrick Heron (British Army officer) =

- Born: c. 1690; Mains of Larg, Dumfries and Galloway
- Died: 1752 or later Annapolis Royal, Nova Scotia
- Allegiance: Great Britain
- Branch: British Army
- Service years: 1709–1752
- Rank: Captain

Captain Patrick Heron was a British Army officer in Nova Scotia during King George's War.

Patrick Heron was born in the town of Mains of Larg around the year 1690. At age sixteen he traveled to London to learn commercial pursuits but ended up taking a position on a slaver bound for Guinea. Heron undertook two such voyages before his father procured for him a lieutenancy in Lord Mark Kerr's regiment of the British Army and soon after an officer's commission in Richard Munden's Regiment. In 1732 he went to North America, probably to avoid payment of debts. In 1737 Heron was stationed at Canso, Nova Scotia, a position which, despite a court martial, he held until he surrendered the town after a French surprise attack in May of 1744. Heron was held by the French as a prisoner of war in the Fortress of Louisbourg until 22 September of that year at which time he and the other British prisoners were released and transported to Boston. In Boston, they provided the Massachusetts leadership with valuable intelligence concerning the defences of the fortification at Louisbourg, which made possible its capture the following year.

Heron was struck from the regimental record in 1752, and nothing further is known of him.
