= Fort William Augustus =

Remains of a British fort in Canso, Nova Scotia

Coordinates: 45.337313°N 60.973005°W

Fort William Augustus (also known as Grassy Island Fort, Fort Phillips) was a British fort built on Grassy Island off of Canso, Nova Scotia, during the lead up to Father Rale's War (1720). In the wake of The Squirrel Affair and the British attack on Fort St. Louis (at present-day Guysborough), Cyprian Southack urged Governor Richard Philipps to build the fort. The Fort was named after Prince William, Duke of Cumberland, a son of George II of Great Britain.

== Construction ==
In 1720, the New Englanders began to construct Fort William Augustus (also known as Fort Phillips after the Governor of Nova Scotia Richard Philipps. Erection of a permanent facility was a violation of long-standing agreements between the Mi'kmaq and the British Americans. This significant violation helped precipitate Father Rale's War two years later.

On 7 August 1720, a party of 60–75 Mi'kmaq joined French fishermen from Petit de Grats in an attack on Fort Phillips as it was being built. The Mi'kmaq killed three men, wounded four, and caused significant damage. The New Englanders took 21 prisoners, which they transported to Annapolis Royal. This raid on Canso was significant because of the involvement of the Mi'kmaq and its further contribution to Father Rale's War.

In 1721, the governor of the Province of Massachusetts took proprietorial attitude toward the Canso fisheries and sent HMS Seahorse to patrol the waters off Nova Scotia. With the arrival of British troops, the Mi'kmaq were discouraged from attacking until the following year. HMS Seahorse was replaced in 1721 by a New England vessel, William Augustus under the command of Southack.

== Father Rale's War ==
Father Rale’s War began on 25 July 1722 and lasted through 15 December 1725.

On 23 July 1723, the village was raided again by the Mi'kmaq, who killed three men, a woman and a child. The New Englanders promptly built a twelve-gun blockhouse to guard the village and fishery in response.

In 1725, sixty Abenakis and Mi'kmaq launched another attack on Canso, destroying two houses and killing six people.

== King George's War ==
Edward How constructed a blockhouse and rebuilt other structures in the 1730s. The French and Mi'kmaq destroyed the fort in the Raid on Canso during King George's War (1744). The area was used to stage of the Siege of Louisbourg (1745). A blockhouse was built, which they named Fort Prince William (Nova Scotia)

== Grassy Island Fort National Historic Site of Canada ==
Grassy Island Fort was recognized as a National Historic Site of Canada in 1962. There are remains of the 1720 redoubt, 1723–24 fort, and the 1735 blockhouse.

== See also ==
- Military history of the Acadians
- Military history of Nova Scotia
- Military history of the Mi’kmaq people

== Sources ==
- Robison, Mark Power. Maritime Frontiers: The Evolution of Empire in Nova Scotia, 1713-1758. Unpublished Doctorate Thesis. Department of History. University of Colorado. 2000
- Haynes, Mark. The Forgotten Battle: A History of the Acadians of Canso/ Chedabuctou. British Columbia: Trafford. 2004
