= Raid on Canso =

Coordinates: 45.3339°N 60.9953°W

- Part of King George's War
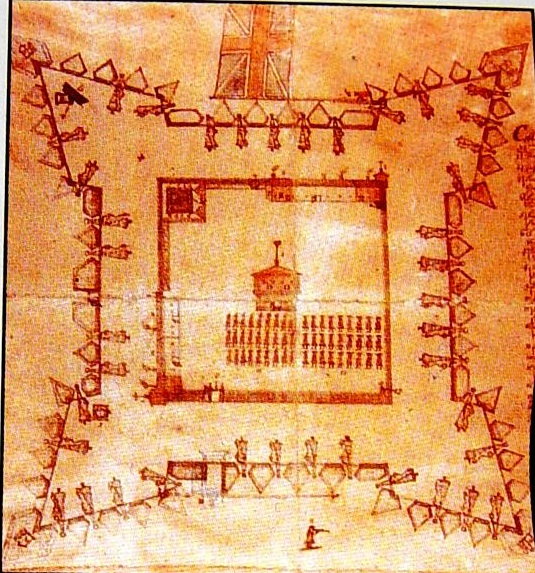
- Fort William Augustus, Canso
Date	23 May 1744
Location	Canso, Nova Scotia
Result	French victory

Belligerents
France; Wabanaki Confederacy (Mi'kmaq militia)	Great Britain

Commanders and leaders
François Dupont Duvivier	Patrick Heron (POW); George Ryall (POW)

Units involved
Acadian militia Wabanaki Confederacy (Mi'kmaq militia); Troupes de la marine	40th Regiment

Strength
17 vessels; 2 privateers; 1 sloop; 14 fishing boats; 351 soldiers: 139 men and officers of the troupes de la marine; 212 militia	Over 100 men; Several ships

Casualties and losses
5 prisoners, 2 wounded, 1 killed	1 killed, 4 wounded, about 100 captured

The Raid on Canso was an attack by French forces from Louisbourg on the British outpost Fort William Augustus at Canso, Nova Scotia shortly after war declarations opened King George's War. The French raid was intended to boost morale, secure Louisbourg's supply lines with the surrounding Acadian settlements, and deprive Britain of a base from which to attack Louisbourg. While the settlement was utterly destroyed, the objective failed, since the British launched an attack on Louisbourg in 1745, using Canso as a staging area.

== Background ==
The inhabitants of Louisbourg received word of France's declaration of war on Great Britain on May 3, 1744. The colony had been facing dwindling provisions, a situation which was aggravated when the news of war brought the threat of British action cutting off the supply lines of Louisbourg. Under these circumstances, the continuance of the colony's provisioning necessitated military action. Furthermore, orders from Maurepas, the French minister of the navy, instructed the governor of Île Royale to utilize the element of surprise and rapidly mobilize against the English. Within a week of the arrival of the news of war a military expedition to Canso was agreed upon, and on May 23 a flotilla left Louisbourg harbour. In this same month Captain David Donahue of the Resolution took prisoner the chief of the Mi'kmaq people of Ile Royale Jacques Pandanuques with his family to Boston and killed him. Donahue also took 8 Mi'kmaw prisoners from Canso on April 14.

== Battle ==
The expedition of Mi'kmaq militia and Compagnies Franches de la Marine, led by Captain François Dupont Duvivier, arrived during the night of May 24, finding Canso weakly defended and unprepared for war. At dawn the French commenced bombardment of the town's only fortification, a timber blockhouse. The British commandant, Captain Patrick Heron and four companies of the 40th Regiment of Foot, realizing that he was out-manned and out-gunned swiftly capitulated, while Lieutenant George Rydall fought on with an armed sloop before surrendering a short time later after his force sustained several casualties. The terms of surrender were promptly worked out, and by mid-morning Canso was in French hands. After loading substantial quantities of loot onto their fleet the French put the town to the torch and weighed anchor. The garrison was taken to Louisbourg to be held as prisoners of war, while passage was arranged to Boston for the women and children.

== Aftermath ==
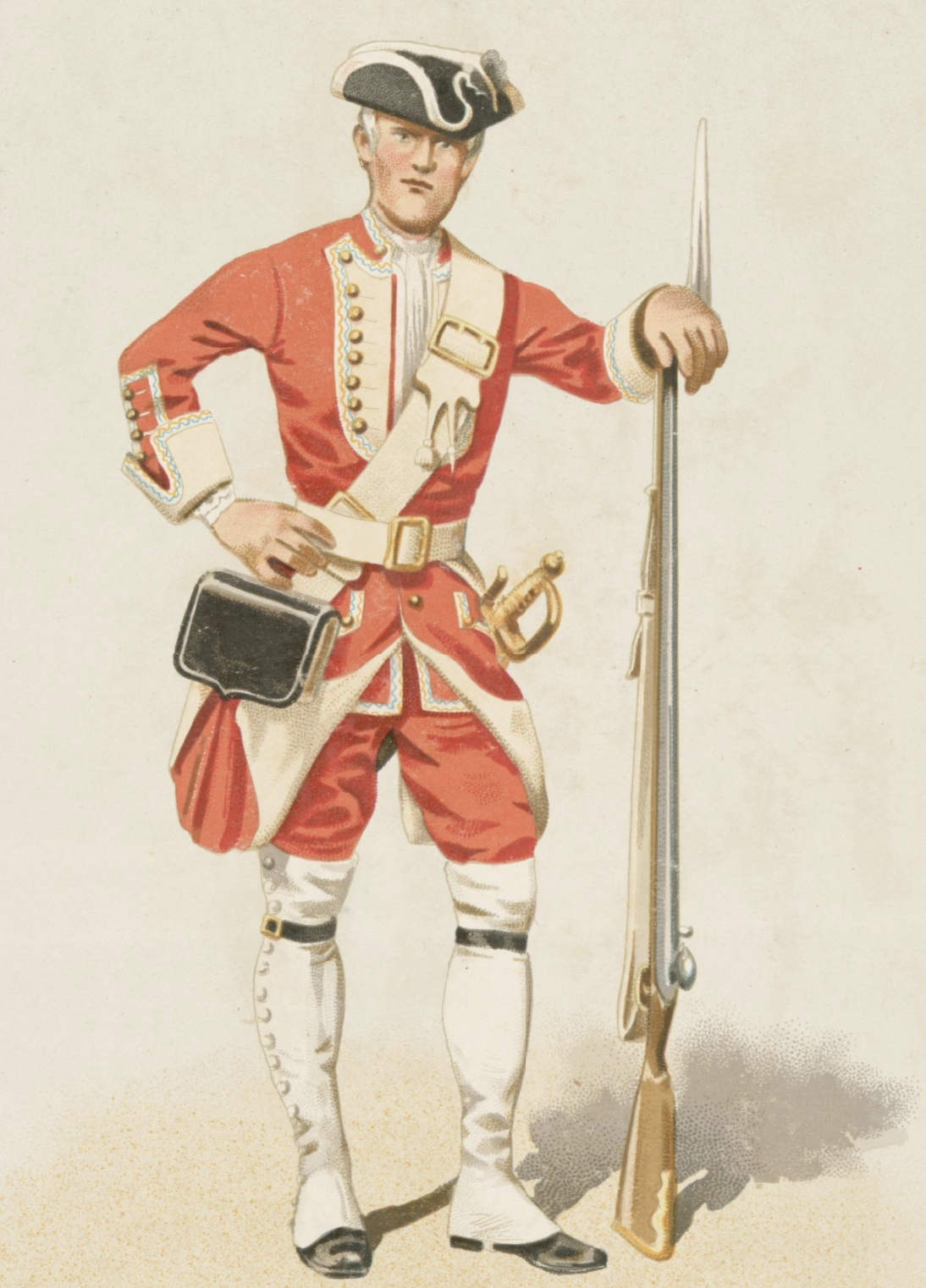
Private, 40th Regiment of Foot, Nova Scotia, 1742 - defending Canso

The success of the raid on Canso caused great excitement and celebration in Louisbourg, bolstering the morale of the French citizenry and their native allies, while depriving Britain of a strategic base in eastern Nova Scotia. However the task of maintaining more than one hundred prisoners taxed the colony's already strained food supply.

Once the 40th regiment's officers and men were paroled in September 1744, the regiment was evacuated to Boston where they (particularly John Bradstreet) provided valuable information on the defences of Louisbourg for the British siege the following year. Governor Shirley was having difficulty raising troops requested by Mascarene and therefore he ordered the ex-Canso garrison to Annapolis Royal.

The raid was followed by a siege of Annapolis Royal. The attacks alarmed the British colonists in the Province of Massachusetts Bay, many of whom believed the raid was a prelude to further attacks on Massachusetts. On October 20, 1744, Massachusetts officially declared war on the Mi'kmaq. In 1745 the province mounted a successful siege of Louisbourg.

== See also ==
- Military history of Nova Scotia
- Siege of Mirandola (1742)
