= East Jeddore, Nova Scotia =

Community in Nova Scotia, Canada

Coordinates: 44°43′51.5″N 63°0′9.5″W

East Jeddore in Nova Scotia

East Jeddore is a small rural fishing community of the Halifax Regional Municipality in the Canadian province of Nova Scotia. It is 45 minutes East of Dartmouth along Highway 7. East Jeddore Road is approximately 11 kilometers long and generally follows Jeddore Harbour from its basin in Oyster Ponds to the mouth.

== History ==
=== Battle at Winnepang (Jeddore Harbour) ===
During the Mi’kmaq and Maliseet War, in July 1722 the Abenaki made an effort to create a blockade of the capital of Nova Scotia Annapolis Royal. They captured 18 fishing vessels along with prisoners between present-day Yarmouth and Canso. They also captured vessels and took prisoners from the Bay of Fundy.

Governor Richard Philipps commissioned Capt. John Eliot and Capt. John Robinson in two sloops with regiments to protect the fishery at Canso, Nova Scotia and retrieve the captured vessels and prisoners. Toward this end, Capt. Eliot made a surprise attack on forty Natives on a ship at present-day Jeddore Harbour. The natives were among six of the fishing vessels they had seized. There was a 30-minute battle. Capt. Eliot was badly wounded as were several of his men. One was killed. Then Capt. Eliot lobbed hand granadoes (original spelling of hand grenade) into the native vessel. Some natives were killed in the explosion. Others tried to swim ashore as they were being shot by the New Englanders.Thirty-five Natives were killed. The New Englanders managed to rescue fifteen prisoners from the vessels, while discovering that nine had been killed.

Captain Robinson captured two of the vessels and killed numerous Maine natives. He then arrived at present-day Lunenburg, Nova Scotia where the natives held five of the fishing vessels along with twenty prisoners. Robinson paid a ransom and they were released.

== See also ==
- West Jeddore, Nova Scotia
