= West Jeddore, Nova Scotia =

Coordinates: 44°43′52.3″N 63°2′14.3″W

West Jeddore in Nova Scotia

West Jeddore is a rural community of the Halifax Regional Municipality in the Canadian province of Nova Scotia.

== History ==
=== Battle at Winnepang (Jeddore Harbour) ===
On July 22, 1722, immediately after the declaration of Dummer's War, Governor Richard Philipps commissioned Capt. John Elliot and Capt. John Robinson in two sloops with regiments to protect the fishery at Canso, Nova Scotia and retrieve the New England prisoners. There was a Mi'kmaq camping place at near-by West Jeddore. There were thirty-nine natives at Winnepang (present-day Jeddore Harbour) harbouring prisoners in seven vessels. Capt. Elliot and Bradstreet arrived in the harbour and attacked the natives in a two-hour naval battle. A boarding party led by Bradstreet overwhelmed the natives with hand grenades and disciplined fire. Capt. Elliot and several of his men were badly wounded. Five of the men were killed.

As the Mi'kmaq tried to swim ashore to escape, the New Englanders opened fire on them. Thirty-five natives were killed. The New Englanders managed to rescue fifteen prisoners from the vessels, while discovering that nine had been killed.

Only five native bodies were recovered from the battle. The New Englanders decapitated the corpses and set the severed heads on spikes surrounding Canso's new fort.

== See also ==
- East Jeddore, Nova Scotia
