= Head of Jeddore, Nova Scotia =

Coordinates: 44°46′32″N 63°03′19″W

Head of Jeddore in Nova Scotia

Head of Jeddore is a rural community of the Halifax Regional Municipality on Trunk 7 on the Eastern Shore of Nova Scotia 47.06 kilometers from Downtown Halifax.

== History ==
=== Battle at Winnepang (Jeddore Harbour) ===
In July 1722, the Abenaki created a blockade around Annapolis Royal, the capital of Nova Scotia, in an attempt to starve it. They captured eighteen fishing vessels along with prisoners between present-day Yarmouth and Canso. They also captured vessels and took prisoners from the Bay of Fundy. In response, to protect the capital from native attack, Lieutenant Governor John Doucett took 22 Mi'kmaq hostage at Annapolis Royal and Massachusetts declared war on the Abenaki.

During Dummer's War, Governor Richard Philipps commissioned Capt. John Eliot and Capt. John Robinson in two sloops with regiments to protect the fishery at Canso and retrieve the captured vessels and prisoners. Toward this end, Capt. Eliot made a surprise attack on forty natives on a ship at Winnepang (present-day Jeddore Harbour). The natives were among six of the fishing vessels they had seized. There was a two-hour naval battle. Capt. Eliot was badly wounded as were several of his men. Five were killed. Then Capt. Eliot lobbed hand granadoes (the original spelling for "grenades") into the native vessel. Some natives were killed in the explosion. Others tried to swim ashore as they were being shot by the New Englanders. Thirty-five Natives were killed. The New Englanders managed to rescue fifteen prisoners from the vessels, while discovering that nine had been killed. The Natives had sent the other sixteen prisoners to Richibucto, New Brunswick.

Only five native bodies were recovered from the battle and the New Englanders decapitated the corpses and set the severed heads on pikes surrounding Canso's new fort.

Captain Robinson captured ten of the vessels and killed numerous Abenaki. He then arrived at Malagash harbour where the natives held five of the fishing vessels along with twenty prisoners. Robinson paid a ransom and they were released.

=== Raids on Jeddore ===
The Mi'kmaq at West Jeddore complained of English fishermen raiding the supplies they received from the government (1753). On one occasion after a raid, the same English vessel which raided the village was wrecked on the rocks. While the Mi'kmaq are reported to have taken care of them, the English were reported to have killed two men, three women, one child and one baby for their scalps.

== Festivals ==
Head of Jeddore used to host the annual Pirates of Jeddore Festival in September.

== Communications ==
- The postal Code is B0J 1P0.
- The Telephone exchange is 902- 889 Aliant

== Demographics ==
- Total Population - 480
- Total Dwellings - 144
- Total Land Area - 3.4304 km^{2}
