= Canso, Nova Scotia =

Community in Nova Scotia, Canada

Canso
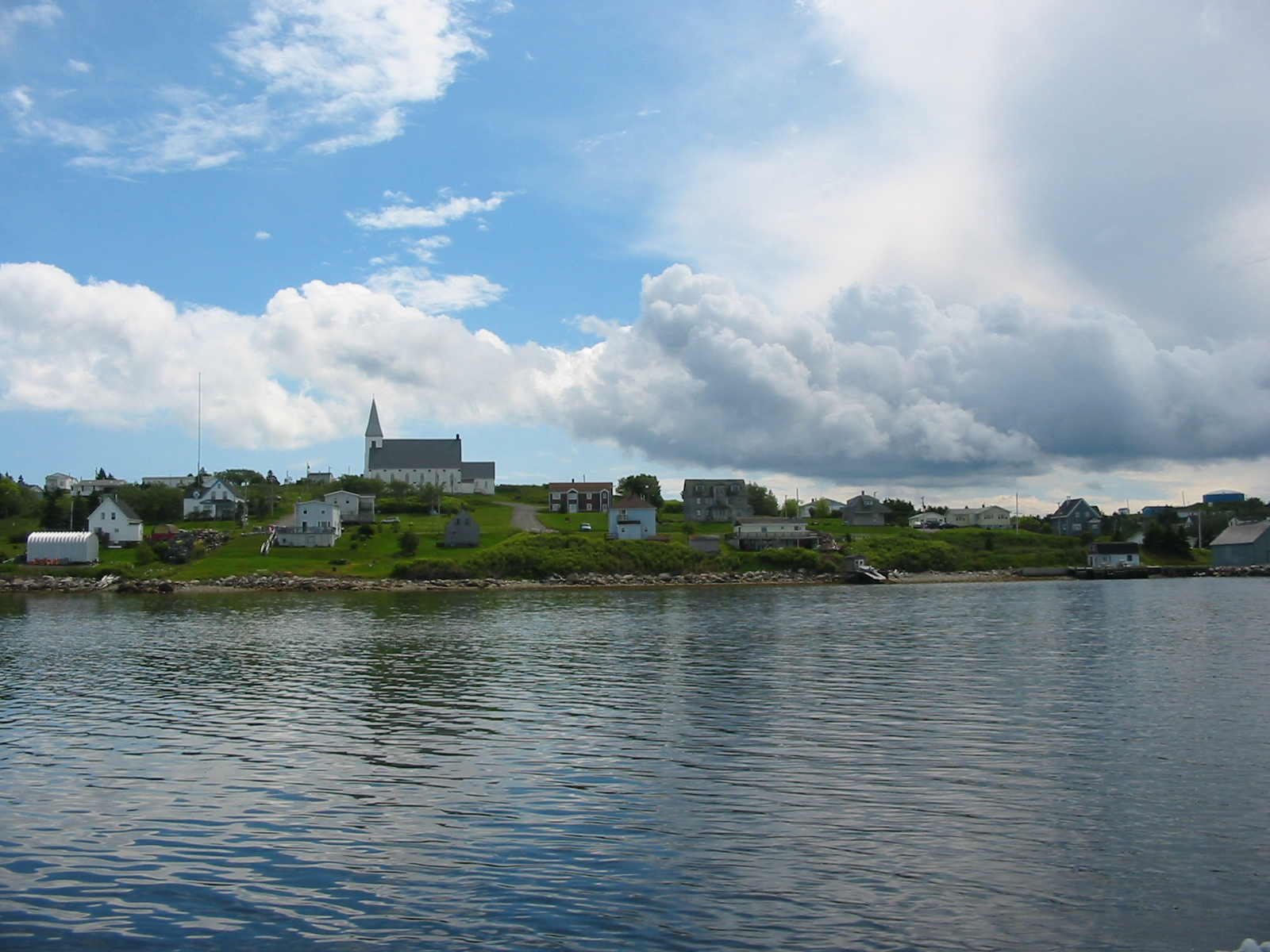
- Canso as seen from the harbour
- Nickname: Oldest Fishing Port on Mainland North America
- Motto: "Heritage, Heart & Home"
- Location of Canso, Nova Scotia
- Coordinates: 45°20′2″N 60°59′43″W
- Country: Canada
- Province: Nova Scotia
- County: Guysborough County
- French Settlement: 1600s
- British Settlement: 1720
- Incorporated: May 14, 1901
- Dissolved: July 1, 2012

Government
  - Type: District Municipality
  - Body: Municipality of the District of Guysborough
  - Councillor: Fin Armsworthy
  - Warden: Paul Long
  - MLA: Greg Morrow (Conservative)
  - MP: Mike Kelloway (Liberal)

Area
  - Land: 5.42 km^{2} (2.09 sq mi)
- Highest elevation: 14 m (46 ft)
- Lowest elevation: 0 m (0 ft)

Population (2016)
  - Total: 739
  - Density: 136.4/km^{2} (353/sq mi)
- Time zone: UTC-4 (AST)
  - Summer (DST): UTC-3 (ADT)
- Canadian Postal code: B0H 1H0
- Area code: 902
- Telephone Exchange: 366
- Median Earnings*: $30,502
- NTS Map: 11F7 Cape Canso
- GNBC Code: CAGBW
- Website: http://www.municipality.guysborough.ns.ca/

Historical population
Year	Pop.	±%
1901	1,479	—
1911	1,617	+9.3%
1921	1,623	+0.4%
1931	1,575	−3.0%
1941	1,418	−10.0%
1951	1,313	−7.4%
1956	1,261	−4.0%
1961	1,151	−8.7%
1981	1,255	+9.0%
1986	1,285	+2.4%
1991	1,228	−4.4%
1996	1,127	−8.2%
2001	992	−12.0%
2006	911	−8.2%
2011	806	−11.5%

Canso (Mi'kmaq: Gamso'q, Scottish Gaelic: Baile Chanso) is an unincorporated community and former incorporated town in Guysborough County, Nova Scotia, Canada. Canso lies on the far north eastern tip of mainland Nova Scotia at the mouth of Chedabucto Bay. It was incorporated as a town in 1901. In January 2012, it ceased to be a separate town, and was amalgamated into the Municipality of the District of Guysborough in July 2012. The area was first settled as a fishing settlement in the 1600s. The construction of a British fort in the village in 1720 was instrumental in contributing to the outbreak of Dummer's War in 1722. The town is of national historic importance because it was one of only two British settlements in Nova Scotia prior to the establishment of Halifax (1749). Canso played a key role in the defeat of Fortress of Louisbourg. Today, the town attracts people internationally for the annual Stan Rogers Folk Festival.

== Geography ==
The community is located on the southern shore of Chedabucto Bay. The southern limit of the bay is at Cape Canso, a headland approximately 3 km (1.9 mi) southeast of the community.

Canso is the southeastern terminus of Trunk 16, an important secondary highway in Antigonish and Guysborough counties.

As the community is situated on the end of a peninsula jutting into the Atlantic Ocean, Canso frequently experiences fog, particularly during the warmer summer months when continental air temperatures collide with cooler ocean temperatures offshore.

=== Canso Islands ===
Canso Harbour is protected by the Canso Islands, a small archipelago lying immediately north and east of the mainland, with Durells Island (named after Philip Durell), Piscataqui Island, George Island, and Grassy Island being the largest.

The islands were designated a National Historic Site of Canada in 1925 due to their role as an important fishing base for French in the 16th century and the British during the 18th century, and as the staging point for the 1745 expedition against Louisbourg. "Grassy Island Fort", the remains of early 18th-century British fortifications (a 1720 redoubt, 1723–24 fort, and a 1745 blockhouse) on Grassy Island, was also individually designated as a National Historic Site in 1962.

== History ==
The Mi'kmaq are known to have had seasonal camps in the area, with archeological finds dating to 400AD.

Since the 16th century, Canso has been a strategically important fishery base. It is said that the harbour of Canso was frequented by European fur traders and fishermen within a dozen years of the arrival of Columbus in America, and an attempt at settlement was made here as early as 1518.

The area was used as a fishing settlement by the French fishery based at present-day Guysborough intermittently from 1632-1718.

=== The Squirrel Affair ===
Shortly after Cyprian Southack established himself at Shelburne, Nova Scotia in 1715, the Mi'kmaq raided the station and burned it to the ground. In response, on September 17–24, 1718, Southack led a raid on Canso and Chedabucto (present-day community of Guysborough) in what became known as the Squirrel Affair. Leading HMS Squirrel, Southack first destroyed the French fishery at Canso before laying siege to Fort St. Louis at Chedabucto, defended primarily by Acadians led by Bernard Lasonde. Fort St. Louis fell and the nearby village was destroyed.

The following day, September 24, Southack released his Acadian prisoners onto the Canso Islands without any provisions or clothing. Others fled to Isle Madame and Petit-de-Grat, Nova Scotia. He seized two French ships, and encouraged Governor of Nova Scotia Richard Philipps to fortify Canso. The English began establishing a presence at Canso, replacing the French.

=== Raid on Canso (1720) ===
On August 7, 1720, 60–75 Mi'kmaq joined French fishermen from Petit de Grat, and attacked the fortification as it was being built. The Mi'kmaq killed three men, wounded four more and caused significant damage. The New Englanders took 21 prisoners which they transported to Annapolis Royal. The raid on Canso was significant because of the involvement of the Mi'kmaq and was a chief factor leading up to Father Rale's War.

In the Fall of 1720, the New Englanders finished building Fort William Augustus (also known as Fort Phillips after Richard Philipps, the then Governor of Nova Scotia). Construction of such a permanent facility was a violation of long-standing agreements between the Mi'kmaq and the fishermen, and also helped to precipitate Father Rale's War.

In 1721, the governor of Massachusetts took a proprietary attitude toward the Canso fisheries, and sent HMS Seahorse to patrol the waters off Nova Scotia. With the arrival of British colonial troops to the region, the Mi'kmaq were discouraged from attacking until the following year. HMS Seahorse was replaced in 1721 by the first naval ship of Nova Scotia, William Augustus, under the command of Cyprian Southack.

=== Father Rale's War ===
==== Raid on Canso (1722) ====
In the lead up to Father Rale's War, in July 1722, the Mi'kmaq and some Abenakis began a major offensive against New England fishermen and traders in an attempt to blockade the Nova Scotia capital of Annapolis Royal. Natives captured eighteen trading vessels in the Bay of Fundy and an additional eighteen New England fishing schooners between Cape Sable and Canso. As a result, the New England Governor declared war on the Mi'kmaq which lasted three years.

The ship William Augustus led ships from Canso to protect the fisheries, which resulted in the battle at Jeddore Harbour, Nova Scotia. Only five native bodies were recovered from the battle and the New Englanders decapitated the corpses and set the severed heads on pikes surrounding Canso's new fort.

==== Raid on Canso (1723) ====
On July 23, 1723, the village was raided again by the Mi'kmaq and they killed three men, a woman and a child. In this same year, the New Englanders built a twelve-gun blockhouse to guard the village and fishery.

==== Raid on Canso (1725) ====
In 1725, sixty Abenakis and Mi'kmaq launch another attack on Canso, destroying two houses and killing six people.

=== King George's War ===
==== Raid on Canso (1744) ====
At the outbreak of King George's War, the French destroyed the flourishing fishing village during the Raid on Canso (1744).

==== Siege of Louisbourg ====
A year later, the village Canso was used as a staging area for the 1745 siege of Louisbourg. The British built a blockhouse, which they named Fort Prince William (Nova Scotia). General Sir William Pepperell arrived at Canso, Nova Scotia, with four thousand and seventy troops, April 4, 1745, and, in three weeks was joined by Commodore Warren, with four ships from England.

=== Father Le Loutre's War ===
==== Raid on Canso (1749) ====
During Father Le Loutre's War, in August 1749, Lieutenant Joseph Gorham was at Canso and his party was attacked by Mi'kmaq. They seized his vessel and took twenty prisoners and carried them off to Louisbourg. Three English and seven Mi'kmaq were killed. After Governor Edward Cornwallis complained to the Governor of Ile Royale, the prisoners were released.

==== Raid on Canso (1752) ====
Another raid happened August 4, 1752.

==== Attack at Canso (1753) ====
On February 21, 1753, 9 Mi'kmaq in canoes attacked an English vessel which had a crew of four at near-by Country Harbour, Nova Scotia. The Mi'kmaq killed two English men and took two others captive for six weeks. After seven weeks in captivity, on April 8, the two English men killed six Mi'kmaq and managed to escape. In response, on the night of April 21 the Mi'kmaq attacked another English schooner in a naval battle between Outique Island and Isle Madame in which the Mi'kmaq attacked an English schooner. There were nine English men and one Acadian who was the pilot. The Mi'kmaq killed the English and let the Acadian off at Port Toulouse, where the Mi'kmaq sank the schooner after looting it.

=== French and Indian War ===
==== Expulsion of the Acadians ====
During the Expulsion of the Acadians the famous ship the Duke William was in port for almost a month awaiting passage to France (1758). While in port the vessel narrowly escaped a raid by Mi'kmaq.

=== American Revolution ===
==== Raid on Canso (1775) ====
During the American Revolutionary War, Canso was subject to numerous raids by American privateers. George Washington's Marblehead Regiment raided Charlottetown, Prince Edward Island on November 17, 1775 and three days later, they raided Canso Harbour.

==== Raid on Canso (1776) ====
On September 22, 1776, Canso was attacked by American privateer John Paul Jones. The privateer sailed on USS Providence and destroyed fifteen vessels, and damaged much property on shore. There he recruited men to fill the vacancies created by manning his prizes, burned a British fishing schooner, sank a second, and captured a third besides a shallop which he used as a tender. Jones then sacked the settlements of Petit-de-Grat and Arichat, Nova Scotia on Isle Madame, Nova Scotia and then returned to Boston.

On November 22, John Paul Jones returned to Canso in USS Alfred. Boats from the ship raided the community, his crews burned a transport bound for Canada with provisions and a warehouse full of whale oil, besides capturing a small schooner. Captain Jones then went on to present-day Sydney, Nova Scotia to free Americans imprisoned in local coal mines.

==== Raid on Canso (1779) ====
Again in 1779, American privateers destroyed the Canso fisheries, worth $50,000 a year to England.

In February 1780, the schooner Freemason struck a rock near Canso and sunk. They landed near Whitehead and 16 of the 19 perished in the woods because of the winter weather. The three survivors got to Canso on March 9, having survived by eating their fellow crew members.

The former seal of Canso

=== Wilmot Town Plot ===
In July, 1764, a town plot was laid out at the site of the present town and named "Wilmot," in honor of Col. Montague Wilmot. Little development occurred and the area was repeatedly raided during the American Revolutionary War, as described above. By January, 1813, there were only six families in residence. The Wilmot town plot remained nearly empty until 1821 when a few houses and stores began to be erected within it. By 1844 there were 250 families resident in the area. The town became known as Canso by the mid 19th century, with the old name Wilmot falling out of use.

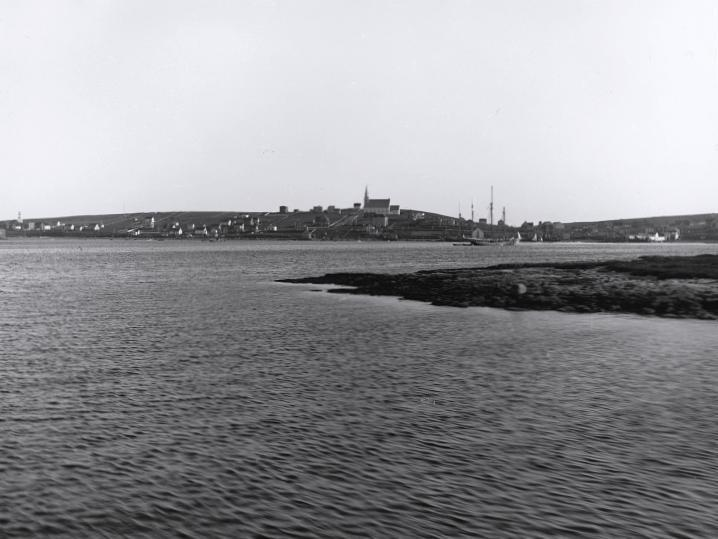
Canso, Nova Scotia – 1914

=== Town of Canso ===
A large storm in 1873 did significant damage to the community. Between 1881 and 1894 several transatlantic cables were landed here and Canso became one of the main communications links between North America and Europe. Canso was incorporated as a town in May 1901.

=== Recent History ===
In a plebiscite held on July 12, 2008, residents narrowly voted to amalgamate the town with the neighbouring Municipality of the District of Guysborough. The decision to amalgamate was put off, and after review was rejected again in March 2023

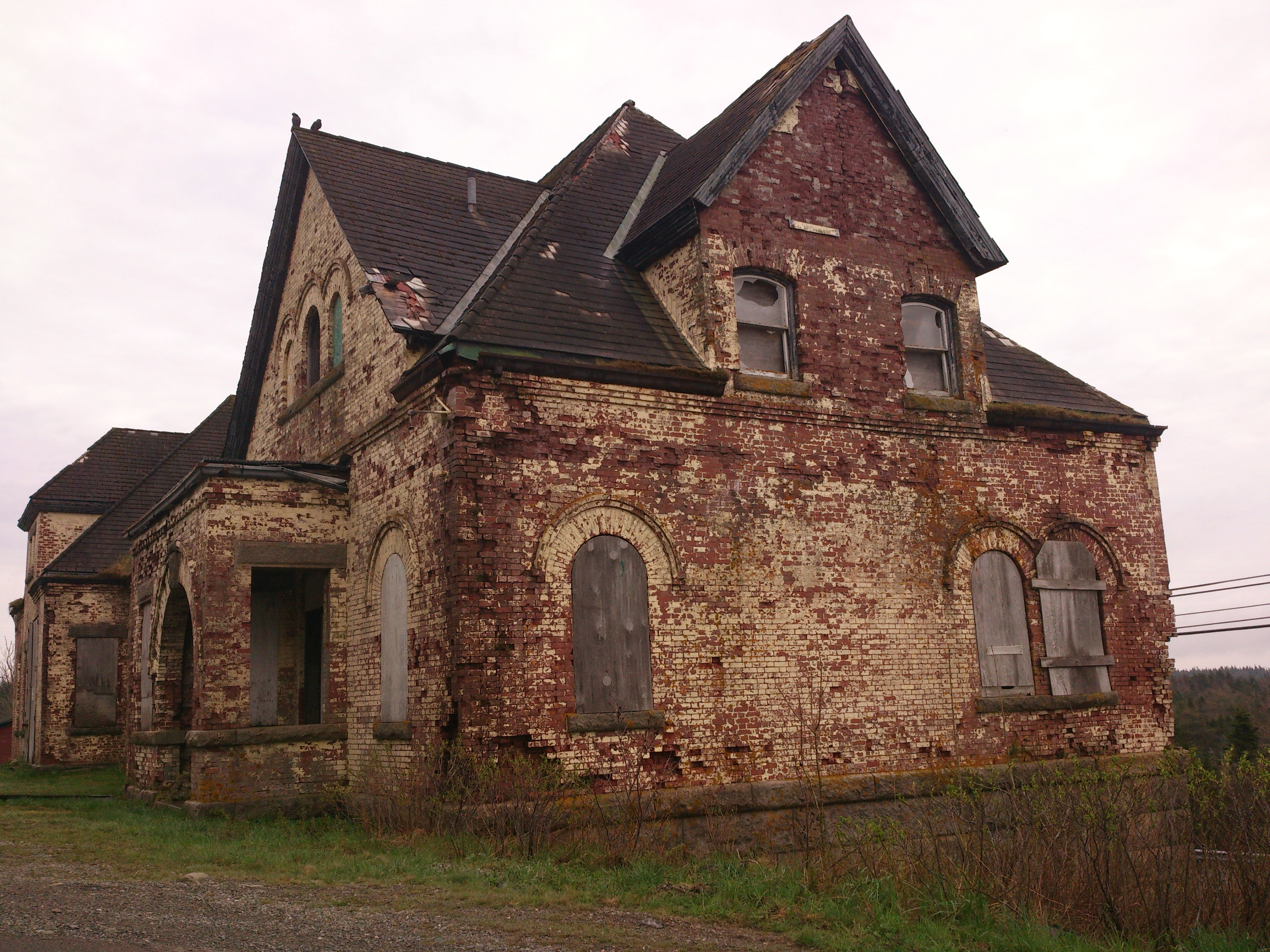
This aging cable building, now a historic site, received the first distress call from Titanic in 1912

On January 19, 2012, the Nova Scotia Utility and Review Board granted the town's application to dissolve. On July 1, 2012, Canso became part of The Municipality of the District of Guysborough.

In early 2017, Maritime Launch Services announced it intended to lease land near Canso to build and operate Canada's only active commercial spaceport, using the Ukrainian Cyclone-4M rocket. Construction is slated to begin in late 2021 and is expected to take three or four years. The first suborbital flight from Canso will be conducted via a small-lift launch vehicle in 2023, while the Cyclone-4M is expected to make its first orbital flight from the facility in 2025.

== Annual events ==
Canso is host to the Stan Rogers Folk Festival, an annual event held around the Canada Day weekend. This event attracts over 10,000 visitors, who enjoy music from all over the world on seven different stages over the 3 days.

Each year, during the second week of August, a regatta is held within the town. This week-long event includes boat races, a mid-way, parade, seaman's memorial, hootenannies as well as various activities for the youth. The regatta draws many previous generations of the town to serve the purpose of a Come Home week. Each year, the regatta has a theme which is reflected in the parade, with 2009's being The Circus Comes to Town.

== Transportation ==
Nova Scotia Trunk 16, a secondary highway important to the counties of Antigonish and Guysborough, terminates in Canso, its easternmost point.

=== Distance chart ===
Destination	Distance (km)	Distance (mi)	Highways	Notes
Guysborough, Nova Scotia	48.2	30.0	Trunk 16	
Port Hawkesbury, Nova Scotia	110	68	Trunk 16 / Hwy 104 (TCH)	
Antigonish, Nova Scotia	112	70	Trunk 16 / Hwy 104 (TCH)	
New Glasgow, Nova Scotia	167	104	Trunk 16 / Hwy 104 (TCH)	
Truro, Nova Scotia	225	140	Trunk 16 / Hwy 104 (TCH)	
Sydney, Nova Scotia	238	148	Trunk 16 / Hwy 104 (TCH) / Hwy 104 / Trunk 4	
Amherst, Nova Scotia	326	203	Trunk 16 / Hwy 104 (TCH)	
Halifax, Nova Scotia	327	203	Trunk 16 / Hwy 104 (TCH) / Hwy 102 / Hwy 118 / Hwy 111	
Yarmouth, Nova Scotia	621	386	Trunk 16 / Hwy 104 (TCH) / Hwy 102 / Hwy 101	

== Notable residents ==
- Joseph Goreham (1725–1790) British military officer stationed at Canso during Father Le Loutre's War
- William Clapham (1722–1763) British military officer stationed at Canso during Father Le Loutre's War
- Carlyle Smith Beals (1899–1979), astronomer.
- Hannah Norris, early feminist
- Howard Amos Rice (born 1872), one-time mayor
- Jimmy Tompkins (1870–1953), founder of the Antigonish Movement
- Richard Murphy – (1838–1916) schooner captain, born in Canso or nearby, sailed out of Gloucester, Massachusetts.
- Garnet Rogers – folk singer, writer.

== See also ==
- Consolidated PBY Catalina, an aircraft designated as "Canso" in Canadian service.
