= Orby Head Formation =

- Stratigraphic range: Artinskian; ~290.1–283.5 Ma
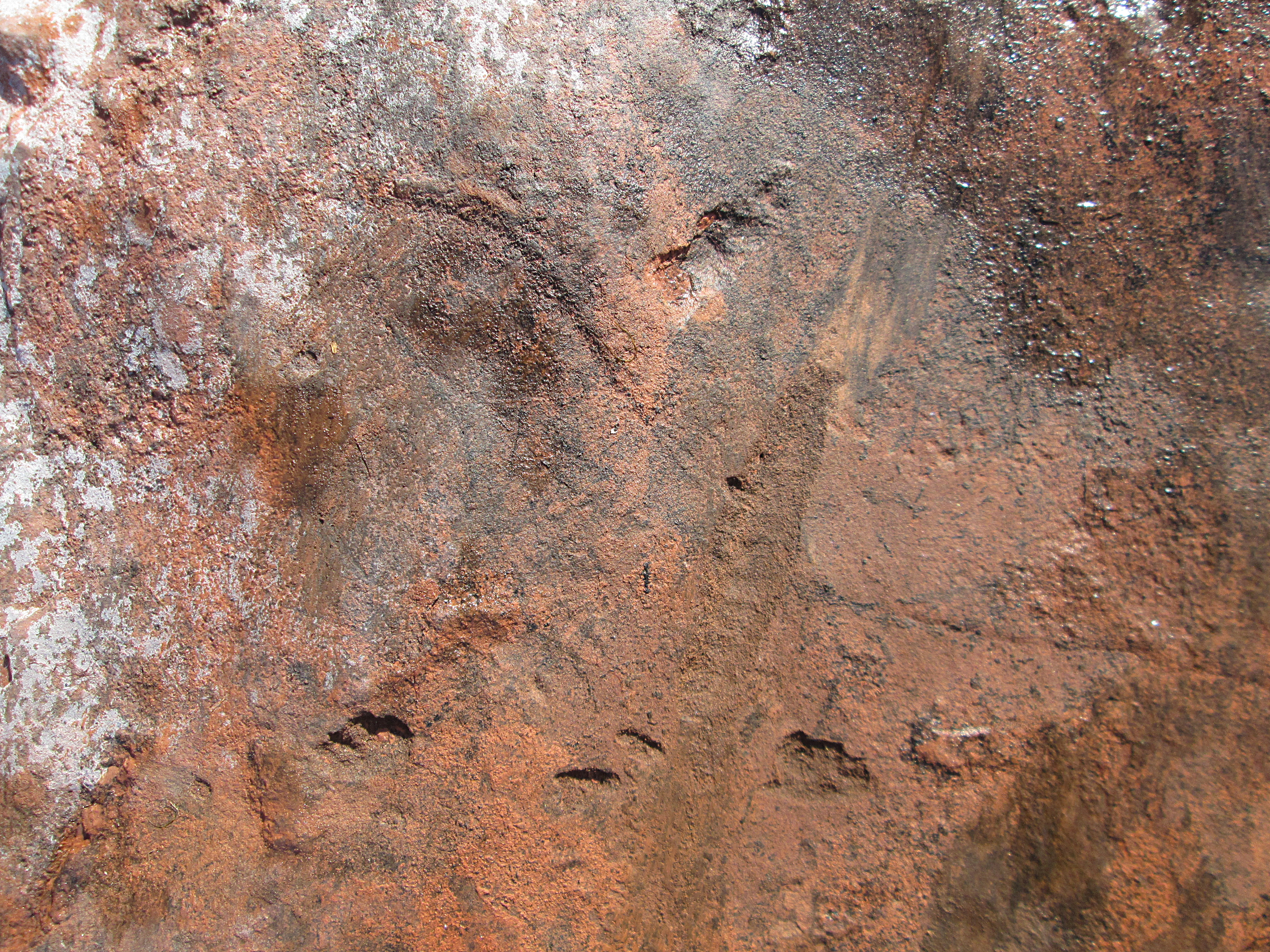
- Fossil in rock from Orby Head Formation
- Type: Formation
- Unit of: Pictou Group

Location
- Coordinates: 46.6°N 63.4°W
- Approximate paleocoordinates: 2.8°N 0.1°E
- Region: Prince Edward Island
- Country: Canada
- Orby Head Formation (Canada)

The Orby Head Formation is a geologic formation in Prince Edward Island. It preserves fossils dating back to the Permian period.

== Fossil content ==
- Dimetrodon borealis

== See also ==
- List of fossiliferous stratigraphic units in Prince Edward Island
