= List of fossiliferous stratigraphic units in Prince Edward Island =

This is a list of fossiliferous stratigraphic units in Prince Edward Island, Canada.

Group or Formation	Period	Notes
Orby Head Formation	Permian	
Pictou Group/Egmont Bay Formation	Carboniferous	
Pictou Group/Hillsborough River Formation	Permian	
Pictou Group/Kildare Capes Formation	Permian	
Pictou Group/Miminegash Formation	Carboniferous	
Pictou Group/Orby Head Formation	Permian	
