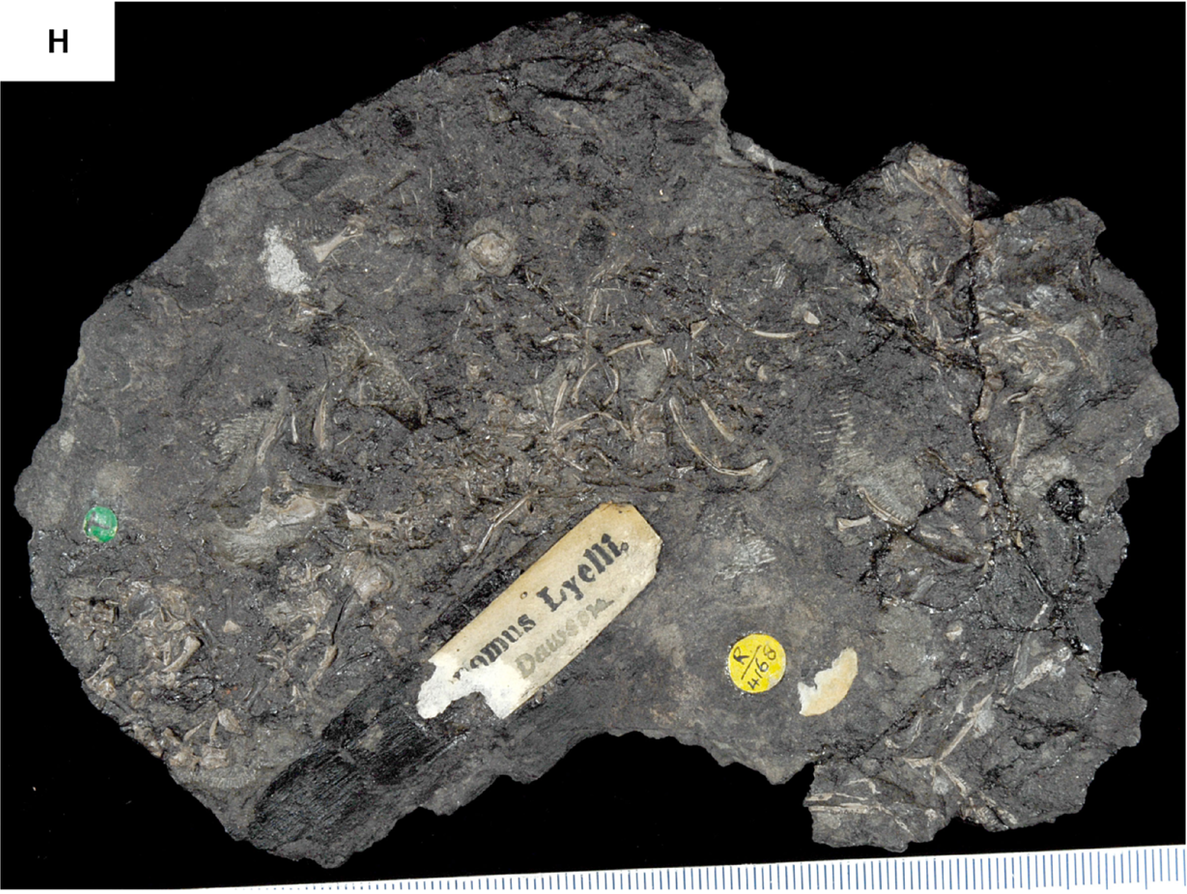
- Holotype specimen (NHMUK PV R 4168)

Scientific classification
- Kingdom: Animalia
- Phylum: Chordata
- Clade: Tetrapoda
- Clade: Reptiliomorpha
- Genus: †Hylonomus; Dawson, 1860
- Species: †H. lyelli

Binomial name
- †Hylonomus lyelli Dawson, 1860

Synonyms
- Hylonomus latidens Dawson, 1882

= Hylonomus =

Hylonomus Temporal range: Bashkirian, 318–315 Ma

Extinct genus of reptiles

Hylonomus (/haɪˈlɒnəməs/; from Greek hylos, meaning 'forest', and nomo, meaning 'dweller') is an extinct genus of early possible amniote that lived 318 million years ago during the Bashkirian stage of the Late Carboniferous. The genus contains a single species, Hylonomus lyelli.

Hylonomus lyelli was named the Provincial Fossil of Nova Scotia in 2002. It was originally interpreted as a 'microsaur' or ancestral to crown group amniotes. Although a number of early 21st century cladistic analyses have suggested that Hylonomus is the earliest known reptile, a 2025 analysis placed Hylonomus outside of crown group Amniota, which would make it less closely related to modern reptiles than mammals are.

== Discovery and naming ==
Hylonomus lyelli was first described by John William Dawson in 1860. The species' name was given in honor of Dawson's teacher, the geologist Sir Charles Lyell. While it has traditionally been included in the group Protorothyrididae, it has since been recovered outside this group.

=== Formerly assigned species ===
Dawson also attributed two other species H. aciedentatus and H. wymani when he described H. lyelli in 1860, and later described two more species H. multidens and H. latidens in 1882. In 1966, Robert L. Carroll suggested that H. latidens is synonymous with the type species H. lyelli and that H. multidens belongs to a different genus of 'microsaur' which he named as Novascoticus. Both H. aciedentatus (also known as Smilerpeton aciedentatum) and H. wymani (RM 3061-9) are later reclassified as specimens of Dendrerpeton acadianum.

== Description ==
Skull reconstruction

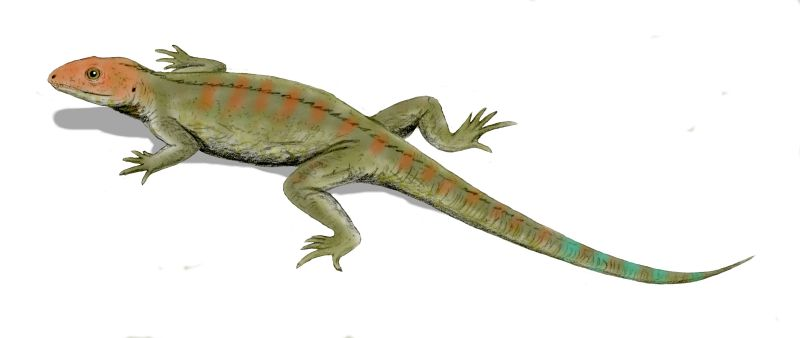
Life restoration

Hylonomus was 20–25 centimetres (8–10 in) long (including the tail). Most of them are 20 cm long and probably would have looked rather similar to modern lizards. It had small sharp teeth and it likely ate small invertebrates such as millipedes or early insects. Specimens of Hylonomus indicate that their bodies are covered with horny scales. They are also described as having slender and lightweight leg and arm bones, long and slim hands and feet, a narrow and tongue-shaped part in the roof of the mouth, a deep groove on a certain bone in the skull, a bumpy structure on the back bones, changes in the height of certain back bone parts, a hole in a specific place on the skull, arm and leg bones that are the same length, a short fourth toe bone compared to the shin bone, a short fifth toe bone compared to the fourth toe bone, long neck bones, and a well-developed opening below the eye.

Size comparison

Fossils of the basal pelycosaur Archaeothyris and the basal diapsid Petrolacosaurus are also found in the same region of Nova Scotia, although from a higher stratum, dated approximately 6 million years later.

Fossilized footprints found in New Brunswick have been attributed to Hylonomus, at an estimated age of 315 million years.

== Paleoecology ==
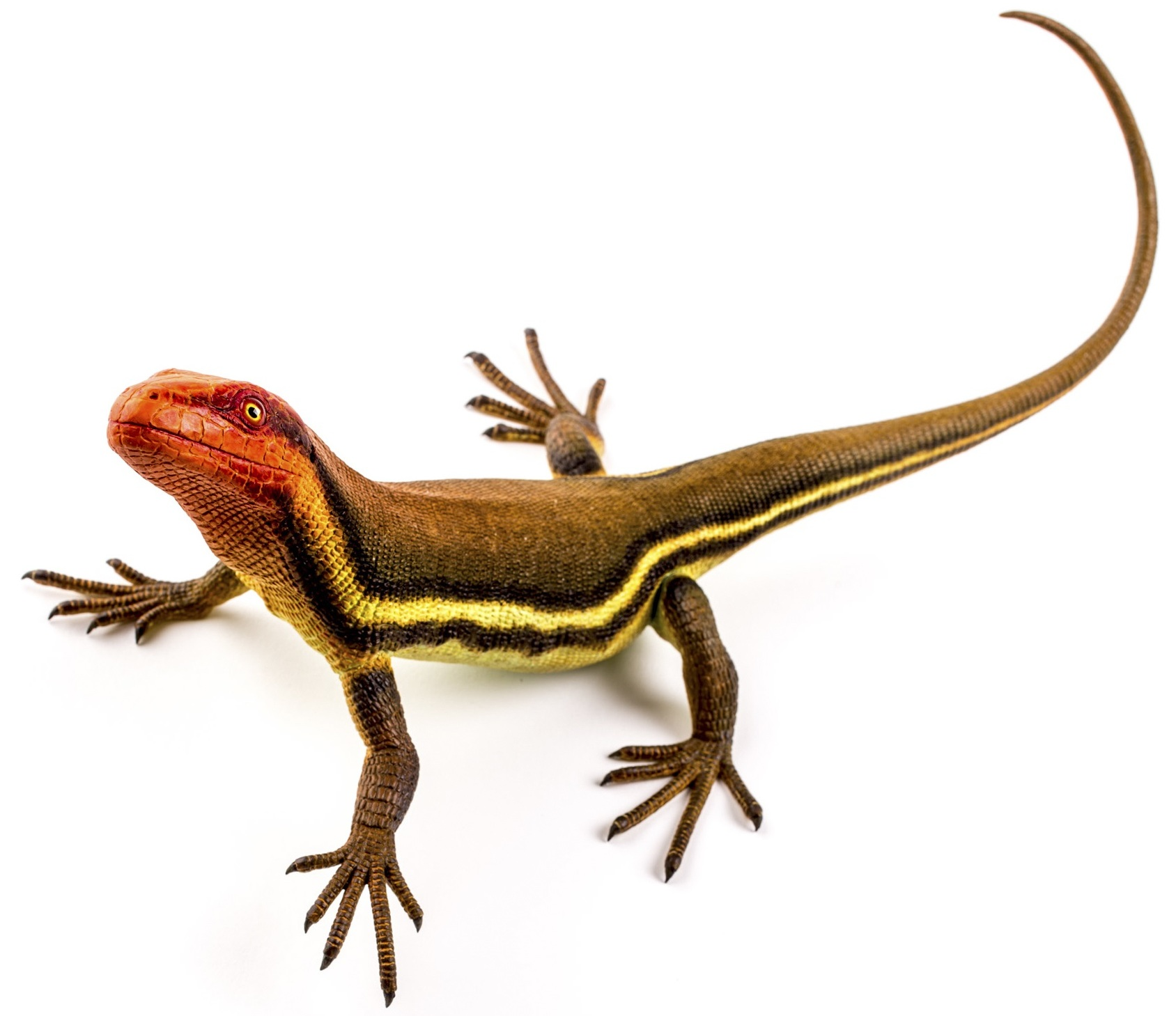
Model life reconstruction

Fossils of Hylonomus have been found in the remains of fossilized club moss stumps in the Joggins Formation, Joggins, Nova Scotia, Canada. It is supposed that, after harsh weather, the club mosses would crash down, with the stumps eventually rotting and hollowing out. Small animals such as Hylonomus, seeking shelter, would enter and become trapped, starving to death. An alternative hypothesis is that the animals made their nests in the hollow tree stumps.

== Classification ==
When first described and analyzed, Hylonomus was interpreted as a 'microsaur' or a genus ancestral to the amniote crown group. Subsequent early attempts at contextualizing Hylonomus using cladistic analyses have suggested affinities of Hylonomus with the earliest reptiles. In 2025, Jenkins and colleagues revised the phylogeny of stem reptiles based on synchrotron data and an expansive phylogenetic dataset. They recovered Hylonomus outside of the amniote crown, similar to the first interpretations. Their phylogenetic analyses placed Hylonomus diverging after the Recumbirostra but before the Captorhinidae within Tetrapoda. These results are displayed in the cladogram below, based on a later study by the same authors.^{supplementary material}

- Tetrapoda
  - Temnospondyli
  - Reptiliomorpha (Pan‑Amniota)
    - - †Gephyrostegus
      - - †Lanthanosuchus
        - †Chroniosaurus (Chroniosuchia)
    - - †Seymouria (Seymouriamorpha)
      - - - †Brouffia
          - †Coelostegus
        - - †Recumbirostra
          - - †Hylonomus
            - - - †Diadectomorpha
                - †Captorhinidae
              - - †Protorothyrididae
                - Amniota
                  - Synapsida
                  - Sauropsida
