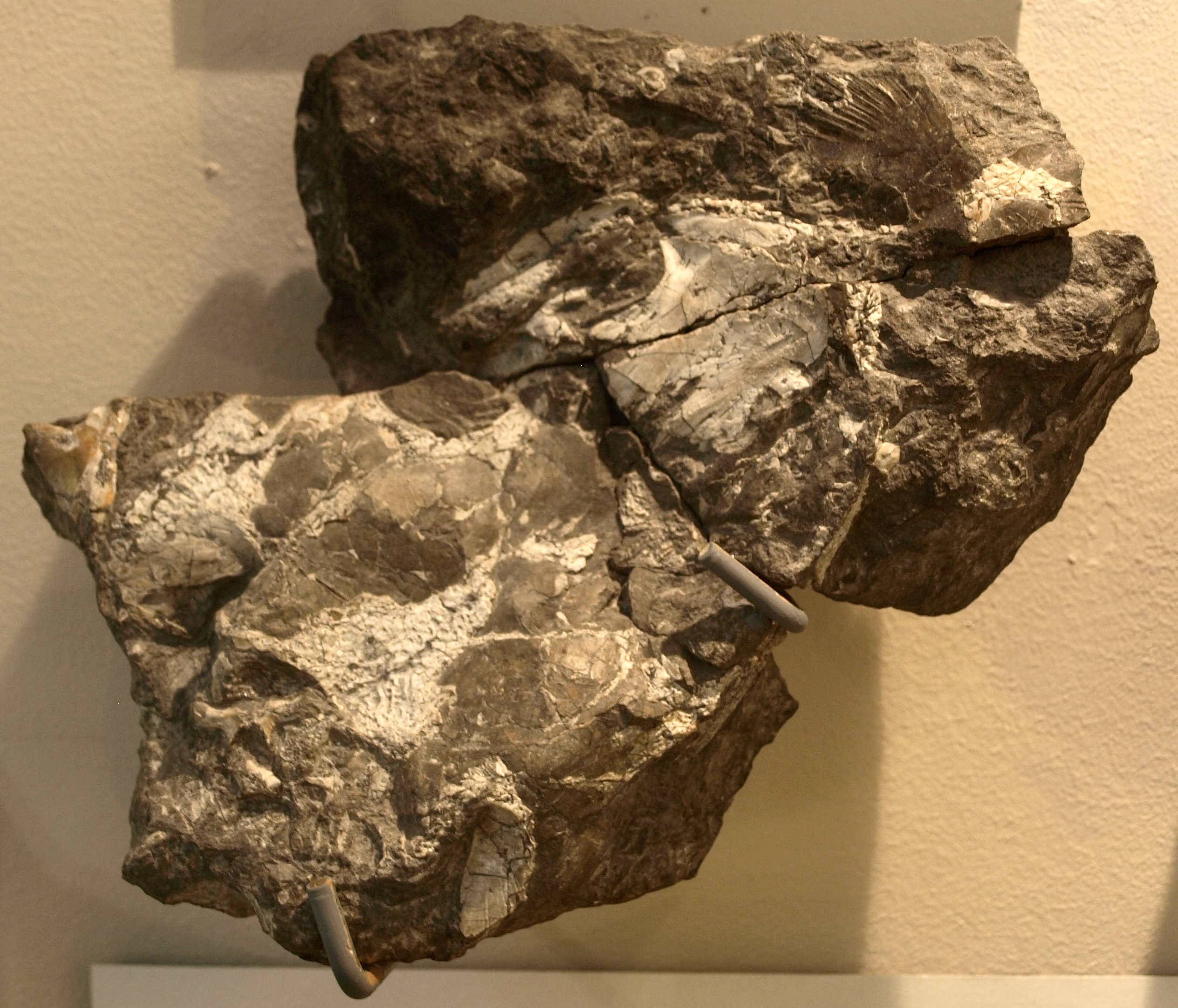
- Skull of Dendrerpeton on display at the Redpath Museum, Montreal

Scientific classification
- Kingdom: Animalia
- Phylum: Chordata
- Clade: Tetrapoda
- Order: †Temnospondyli
- Family: †Dendrerpetontidae
- Genus: †Dendrerpeton; Owen, 1853

Type species
- †Dendrerpeton acadianum Owen, 1853

Species
- Dendrerpeton acadianum; Dendrerpeton annectens; Dendrerpeton confusum; Dendrerpeton rugosum

Synonyms
- Hylonomus aciedentatus Dawson, 1860; Smilerpeton aciedentatum (Dawson, 1860); Hylonomus wymani Dawson, 1860; Erpetocephalus rugosus Huxley, 1867; Ichthyerpeton hibernicum Lydekker, 1891

= Dendrerpeton =

Dendrerpeton Temporal range: Carboniferous Westphalian

Extinct genus of amphibians

Dendrerpeton (from Greek: δένδρον déndron, 'tree' and Greek: ἑρπετόν herpetón, 'creeping thing') is a genus of an extinct group of temnospondyl amphibians. Its fossils have been found primarily in the Joggins Formation of Eastern Canada and in Ireland. It lived during the Carboniferous and is said to be around 309–316 million years of age, corresponding to more specifically the Westphalian age. Of terrestrial temnospondyl amphibians evolution, it represents the first stage. Although multiple species have been proposed, the species unanimously recognized is D. acadianum. This species name comes from "Acadia" which is a historical name for the Nova Scotia region as a French colony. It refers to the location of the coal field at which the fossil was found.

== History and discovery ==
The majority of Dendrerpeton fossils that had been discovered were disarticulated due to the way in which they had formed. They are often associated with lycopsid, Sigillaria, and Calamites tree stumps which decayed inside and became hollow, and are found in Parrsboro formation and the Joggins formation in Nova Scotia. There is also evidence for articulated specimens in Ireland at the Jarrow Colliery. However, they were found to be enveloped by substance that had a very low pH. Although not all specimens were equally affected and some were well preserved, many were not because of this pH. In general, many of the fossils are found in the trunks of these trees or coal swamps.

In 1861 one of the first skeleton of Dendrerpeton acadianum almost in its entirety was discovered by J.W. Dawson at the South of Joggins, Nova Scotia. It was part of the trunk of a tree, and likely this trunk in which the animal had been was about four feet deep. The skeleton however remained because the bark was preserved due to coal that was bituminous. In 1998 came the first skeleton of Dendrerpeton acadianum that was nearly completely articulated, again from the Joggins of Nova Scotia. It was essentially undisturbed, and in this case was not associated with a tree but instead with a boulder found at a beach. This specimen provided the opportunity for a deeper understanding of the skeleton of this taxon because of its three-dimensionality and the detail preserved.

== Paleoenvironment and geology ==
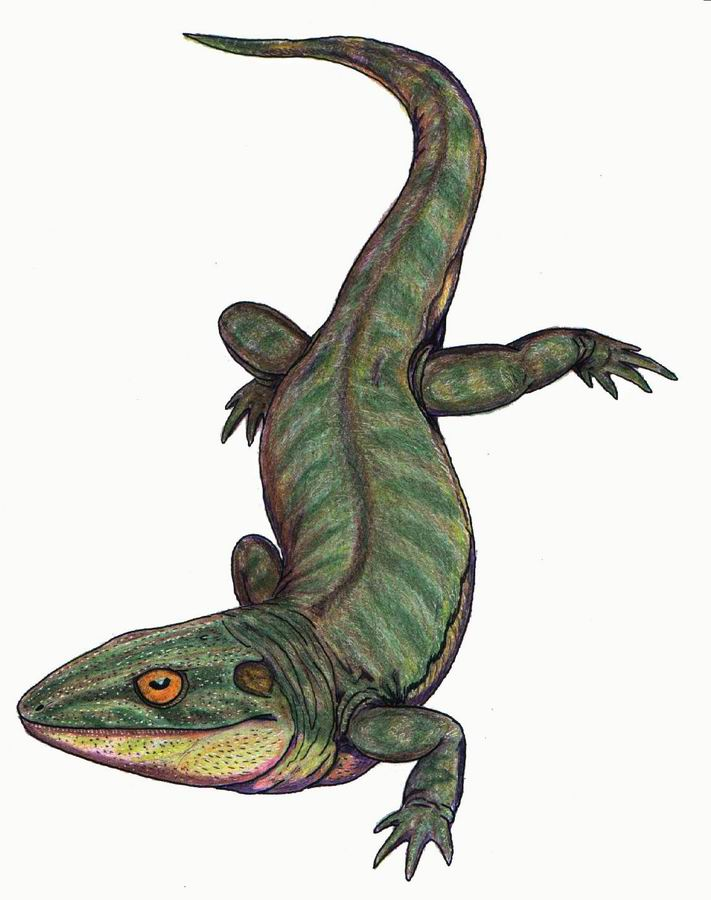
Restoration

Generally, the distribution of Dendrerpeton is rather concentrated in the region of Nova Scotia, Canada, more specifically many specimens were found in the Joggins formation. However, there are also fossils indicating the animals presence in Ireland. In Ireland the environment consisted heavily of coal swamps ecosystems which are found in the Carboniferous. These coal swamps were also found in Nova Scotia, as well as cliffs along the coast. There often are erosions happening in this region with the many cliffs. Also present are strata that drip downwards of the rocks which have been investigated, and the general climate is predicted to lean more humid, but there are times of shift to drier conditions. It has been predicted that the environment at the time could have undergone fires, which was discovered through the examination of fossil charcoal. This leads to one explanation for the abundance of fossils found within the tree stumps, speaking particularly here about Dendrerpeton. The occurrence of a fire may have caused them to seek shelter and protection by hiding away into the decayed hollow cores of the trees, as explained by Andrew Scott. However, it is also explained that rather than escaping to the trees by choice, they get trapped. This works particularly for terrestrial animals such as Dendrerpeton, however other taxa are also found and there is evidence of their survival within these stumps for some period of time, proven by the presence of coprolitic material preserved in the fossils. Temnospondyls are said to be found from the Carboniferous to the middle-Cretaceous, and Dendrerpeton considered to be of the earliest or base of the temnospondyls indicating its existence primarily during the Carboniferous.

== Description ==
The length of Dendrerpeton is approximately 35 cm in length according to the measurements done on the nearly fully articulated skeleton, keeping in mind that there was a short portion of the tail posteriorly missing. Additionally, had stated that the maximum length could be up to a meter.

=== Skull and Skeleton ===
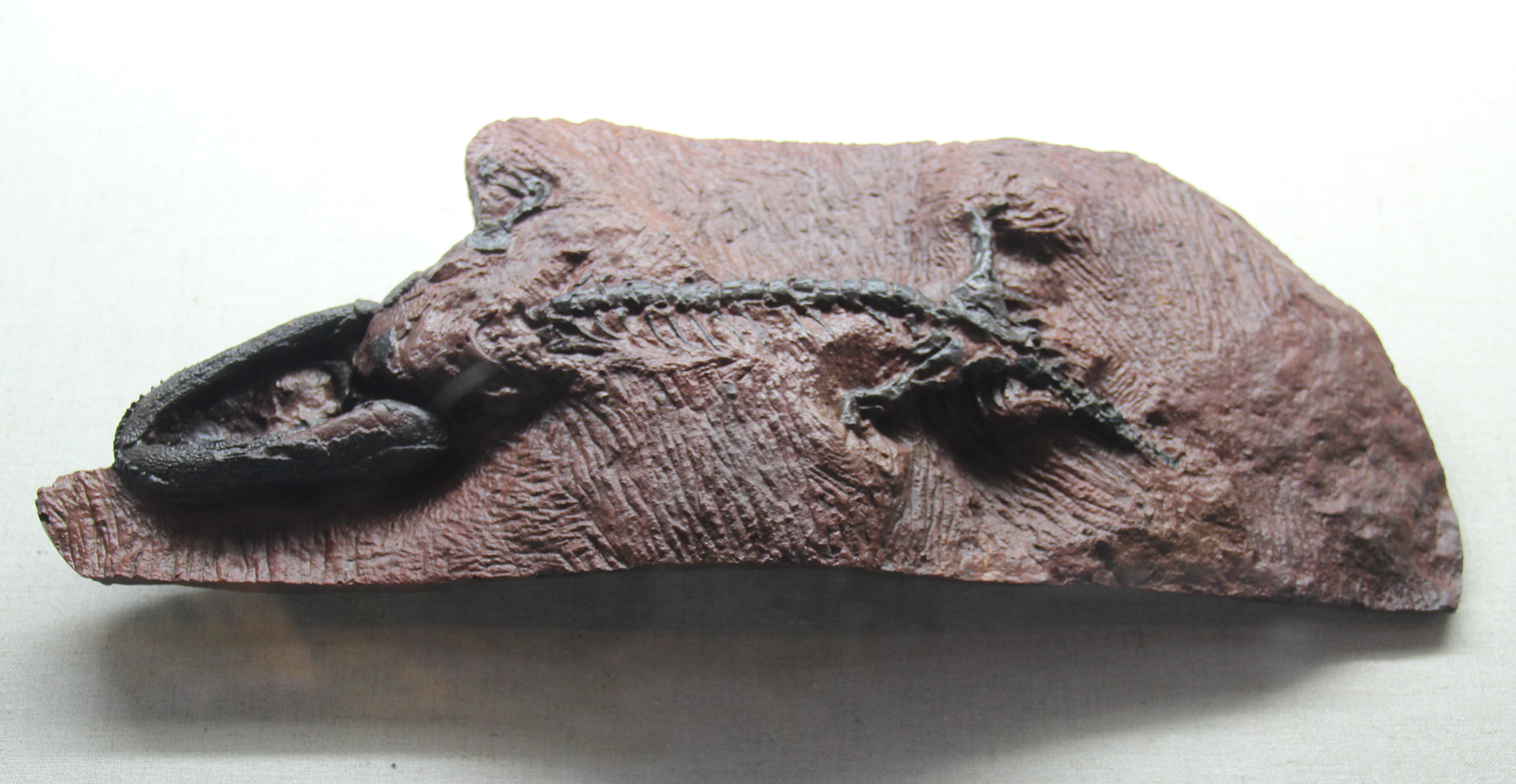
Specimen of Dendrerpeton acadianum from the Prehistoric Gallery of the Inner Mongolia Museum in China

The length of the skull can range from 84 mm to 104 mm for midline length. to Through the analysis of the middle ear region of Dendrerpeton acadianum, it could be determined that this taxa has a tympanic ear that is not there as a means of support for the palatoquadrate, but rather the positioning of the stapes indicates that it is used for the movement of sound. This morphology demonstrates Dendrerpeton having a hearing system that mimics that of anurans. This was contrary to what was previously thought, which was that it had a "squamosal embayment" rather than an otic notch. However, an otic notch can now be considered a feature of this taxa. Also present are interpterygoid vacuities, and a pair of palatal tusks within the vomer which lay medially to the internal naris. Palatal tusk pairs can also be found the ectopterygoid and the palatine. As for the lower jaw, if the animal catches prey it is able to get it to the denticulate palate because compression of the mandibles is not lateral along their length. The dentary of the lower jaw was found to be the biggest of all the mandibular parts. There also looked to be approximately 40–50 teeth found on each jaw side (in the upper jaw including both the premaxilla and maxilla), the marginal teeth. With these teeth Dendrerpeton can catch larger prey, and was also found to feed on insects which was determined through examination of fossils and presence of insects in the coal forests. The elements of the skull which are on the surface and exposed have denticles all over. On the dorsal side of the skull and positioned more posteriorly there is a foramen.

=== Post-cranial skeleton ===
Within the vertebral column it is noted that the intercentrum is smaller than the rhomboidal paired pleurocentra and the posterior centrum having a concave shape that will meet with the next intercentrum. The notochord was encompassed by a thickened wall formed by the intercentra. With examination it was also found that a long tail was not likely present in this animal. In regards to the ribs, they are generally short and costal cartilage appears to have once been present because of swelling that is found where the end of the shaft is.

== Classification ==
Dendrerpeton is the genus of the family Dendrerpetondtidae which contains both Balanerpeton and Dendrerpeton. It is part of the order Temnospondyli. Although it is most commonly known for the species D. acadianum, there have also been other species names proposed. However, there seems to be discussion on whether any of them are valid enough to distinguish as a separate species of their own. An example of one of these species is Dendrerpeton oweni, which Robert Carroll claimed had no particular distinguishable feature and looked to be simply Dendrerpeton acadianum but smaller because it is of younger age.
