= Kildare Capes Formation =

Geologic formation in Prince Edward Island

- Stratigraphic range: Permian
- Type: Formation

Location
- Region: Prince Edward Island
- Country: Canada

The Kildare Capes Formation is a geologic formation in Prince Edward Island. It preserves fossils dating back to the Permian period.

== See also ==
- List of fossiliferous stratigraphic units in Prince Edward Island
