= Pictou Group =

- Stratigraphic range: Late Carboniferous-Permian; Late Carboniferous–Permian
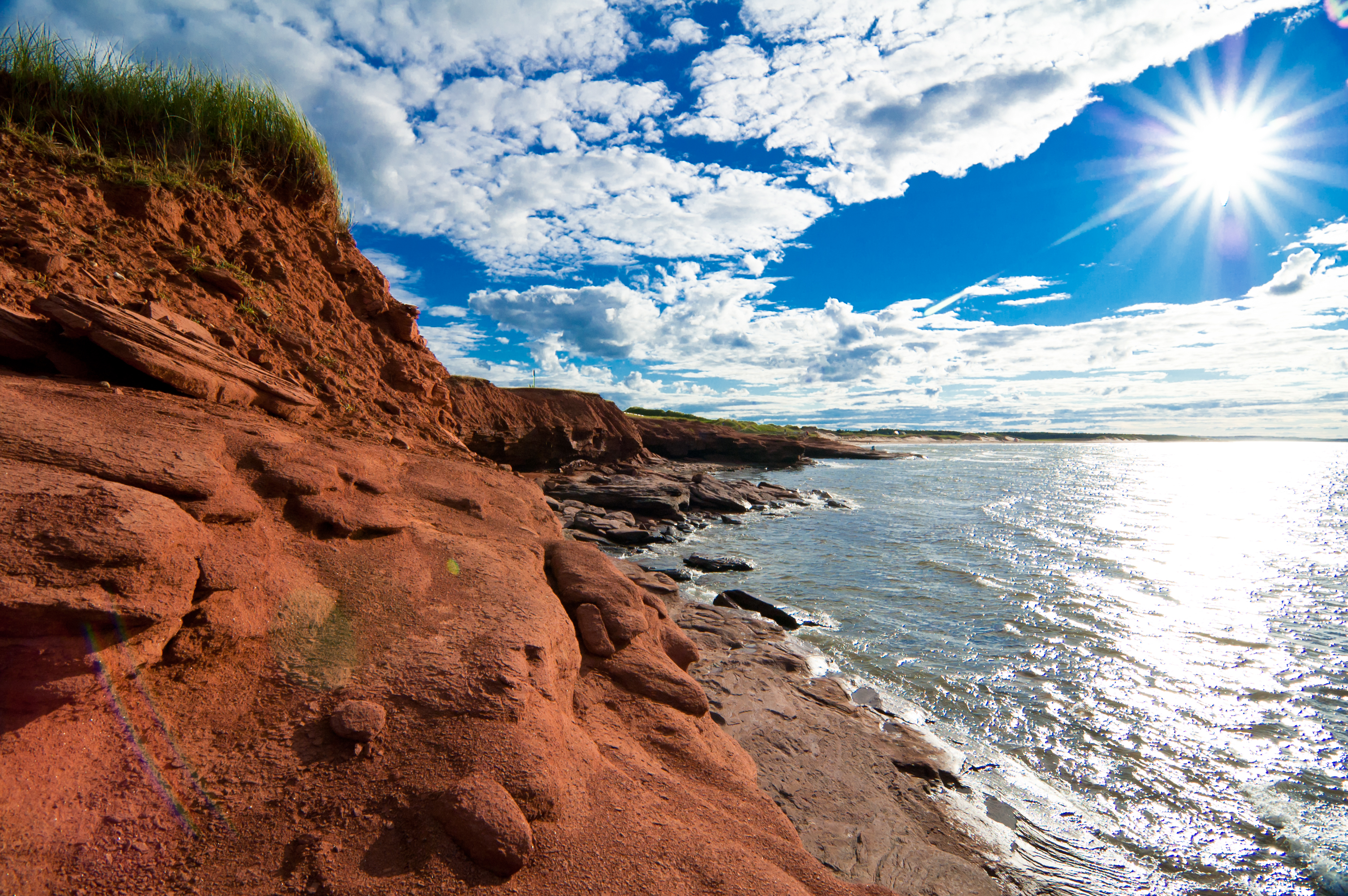
- Pictou Group sandstone exposed in Prince Edward Island National Park
- Type: Geological group
- Sub-units: Balfron, Tatamagouche and Cape John Formations
- Underlies: -
- Overlies: Cumberland and Windsor Groups
- Thickness: up to 3,000 metres (9,840 ft)

Lithology
- Primary: Sandstone
- Other: Mudstone, siltstone

Location
- Coordinates: 45.56827°N 63.01994°W
- Region: Cumberland Basin
- Country: Canada

Type section
- Named for: Pictou County, Nova Scotia
- Named by: W.A. Bell
- Year defined: 1926

The Pictou Group is a stratigraphic unit of Late Carboniferous to Permian age in the Cumberland Basin of Atlantic Canada.

It takes the name from Pictou County, Nova Scotia, and was first described in outcrop along the West Branch River John by W.A. Bell in 1926.

== Lithology ==
The Pictou Group is composed of red beds sandstone, mostly subarkose and sublitharenite. Siltstone is also present, also rarely conglomerate and coal. Fossil remains include bivalves, ostracods, fish, amphibians and reptile fragments, as well as rare plant fragments.

== Distribution ==
The Pictou Group is present throughout the Maritimes Basin, thickness vary from 1,650 metres (5,410 ft) in Pictou County to 3,000 metres (9,840 ft) in Prince Edward Island.

== Relationship to other units ==
The Pictou Group contains the Balfron, the Tatamagouche, and the Cape John Formations.

The Formation is mostly exposed in outcrops or covered with glacial till. It unconformably overlays the Carboniferous Cumberland Group or the Mississippian Windsor Group.

It is equivalent to the Morien Group of Cape Breton Island and Stellarton Group on central Nova Scotia. The Pictou Group is also a synonym to the Prince Edward Island Group (include the Miminegash, Egmont Bay, Kildare Capes, Hillsborough River and Orby Head formations.
