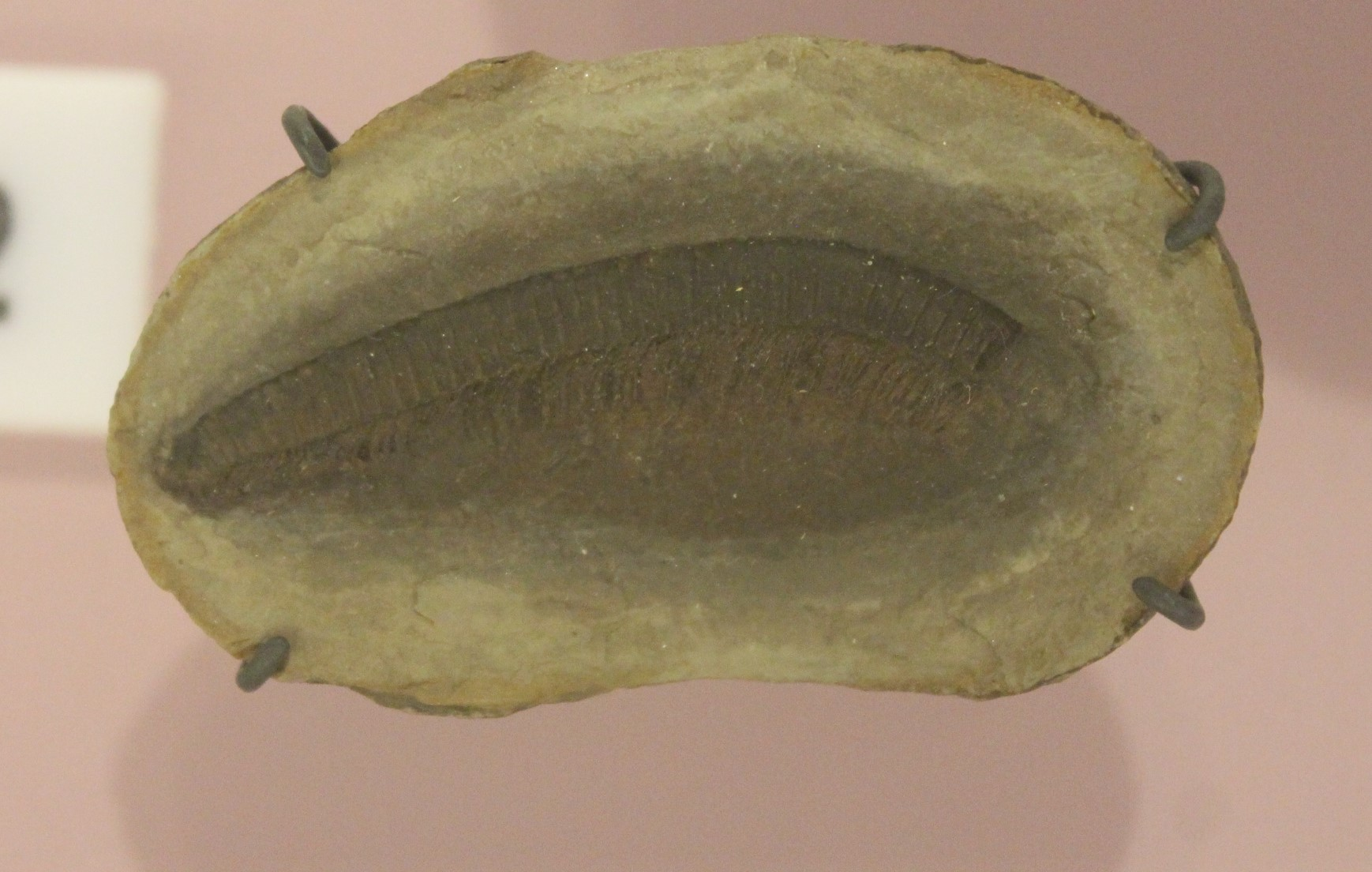
- Syntype of X. mazonus (USNM 38036)

Scientific classification
- Kingdom: Animalia
- Phylum: Arthropoda
- Subphylum: Myriapoda
- Class: Diplopoda
- Order: incertae sedis
- Family: †Xyloiulidae
- Genus: †Xyloiulus; Cook, 1895

Type species
- Xyloiulus sigillariae (Dawson), 1860

Species
- Xyloiulus bairdi Hoffman, 1963; Xyloiulus frustulentis Scudder, 1890; Xyloiulus mazonus Scudder, 1890; Xyloiulus pstrossi Fritsch; Xyloiulus sigillariae (Dawson), 1860; Xyloiulus sellatus Fritsch

Synonyms
- Xylobius

= Xyloiulus =

Xyloiulus Temporal range: Late Carboniferous

Extinct genus of millipedes

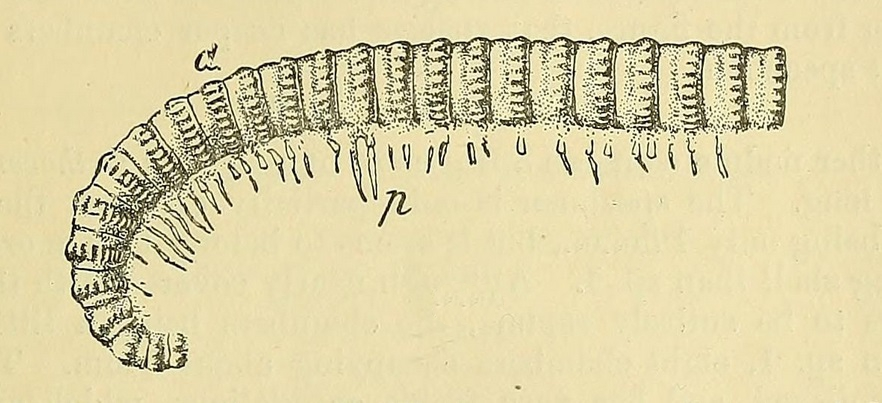
Illustration of X. moniliformis fossil

Xyloiulus is an extinct genus of millipede that lived during the Late Carboniferous which grew up to 2.25 inches (5.7 cm) in length. Fossils of the animal have been found in North America and Europe. The fossils are typically found in Sigillarian stumps.
