= Fugichnia =

Trace fossil

Fugichnia is an ethological class of trace fossil characterized as "escape burrows" that are formed as a result of organisms' attempts to escape burial in sudden high-sedimentation events like turbidity currents. The burrows are often marked with chevron patterns showing the upward direction the organisms were tunneling.

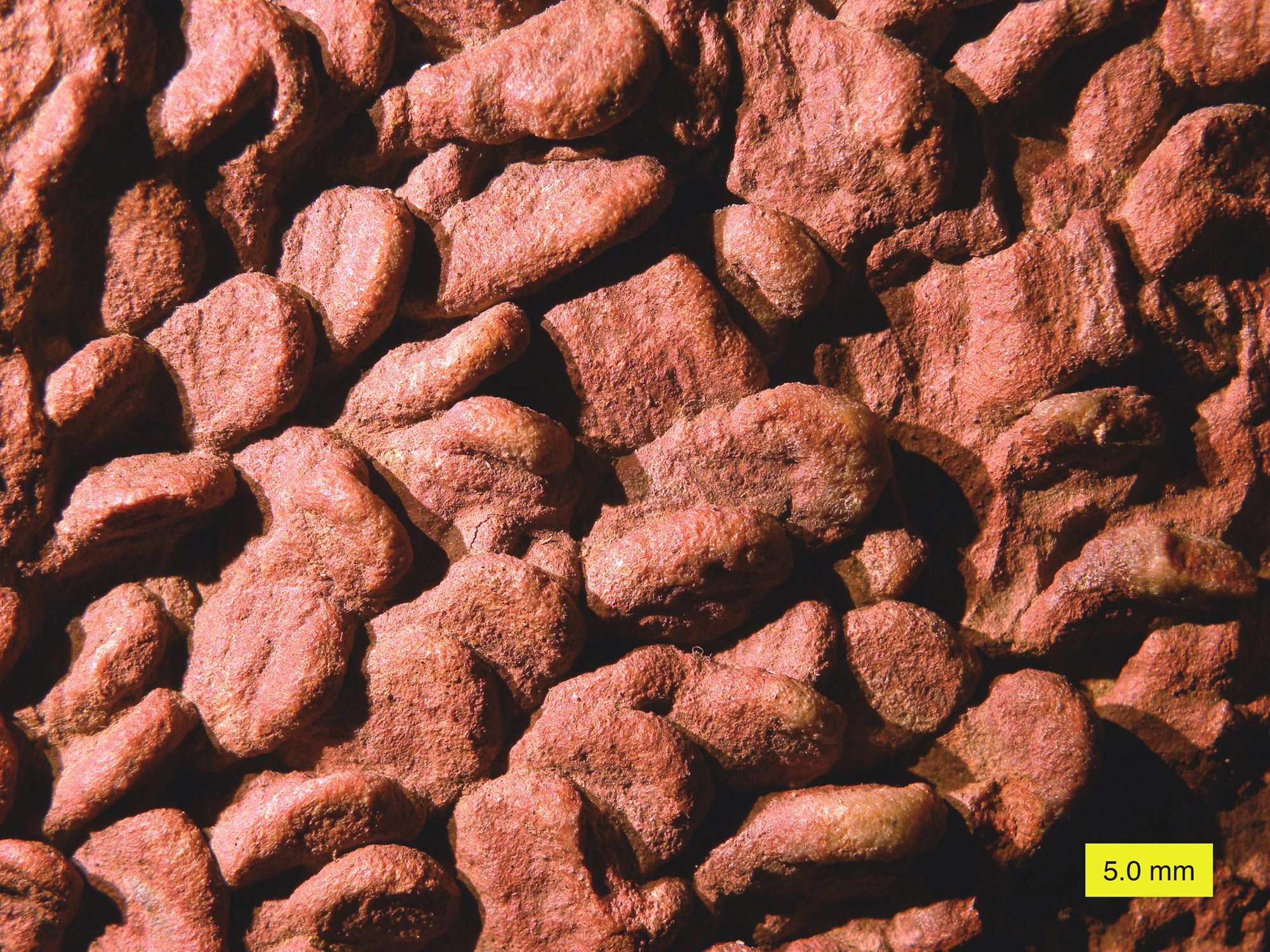
Lockeia from the Dakota Formation (Upper Cretaceous). These are bivalve escape burrows (fugichnia).

== See also ==
- Ichnology
