= Cumberland Group =

Geologic group in Nova Scotia, Canada

- Stratigraphic range: Carboniferous
- Type: Group

Location
- Region: Nova Scotia
- Country: Canada

The Cumberland Group is a geologic group in Nova Scotia. It preserves fossils dating back to the Carboniferous period.

== See also ==
- List of fossiliferous stratigraphic units in Nova Scotia
