= E. spectabilis =

E. spectabilis may refer to:

- Elaenia spectabilis, the large elaenia, a bird species
- Eragrostis spectabilis, a flowering plant species
- Eremophila spectabilis, a flowering plant species
- Eucamptognathus spectabilis, a ground beetle species
- Eurybia spectabilis, a flowering plant species
