= Barnston (surname) =

Barnston is a surname, and may refer to:

- Harry Barnston (1870–1929), British Conservative politician
- Henry Barnston (1868–1949), English-American rabbi
- George Barnston (c.1800–1883), Scottish fur trader and naturalist
- James Barnston (1831–1858), Canadian physician
- John Barnston (died 1645), English divine
- John George Barnston (c.1838–1883), lawyer and political figure in British Columbia
