= Barnston =

Barnston, as a place, may refer to:

- Barnston, Essex, a village and civil parish in Essex, England
- Barnston, Merseyside, a village in Merseyside, England
- Barnston Island, British Columbia, Canada
- Barnston, Quebec, a former township now part of Coaticook, Quebec, Canada
- Barnston Mount, a mountain in Coaticook, Estrie, Quebec, Canada
- Barnston Manor in Dorset, England

As a name: see

- Barnston (surname)
