= Gymnogramma dealbata =

Gymnogramma dealbata is the name of a fern species, which may refer to:

- Gymnogramma dealbata C.Presl, described in 1825, now known as Pityrogramma dealbata
- Gymnogramma dealbata (Pursh) Nutt. ex Mett., combined in 1859, an illegitimate later homonym, now known as Argyrochosma dealbata
