= Redpath Museum =

Coordinates: 45°30′16″N 73°34′39″W

- Established: 1882
- Location: 859 Sherbrooke Street West, Montreal, Quebec, Canada
- Type: Museum of natural history
- Director: Catherine Turgeon
- Public transit access: at Peel station at McGill station
- Website: www.mcgill.ca/redpath

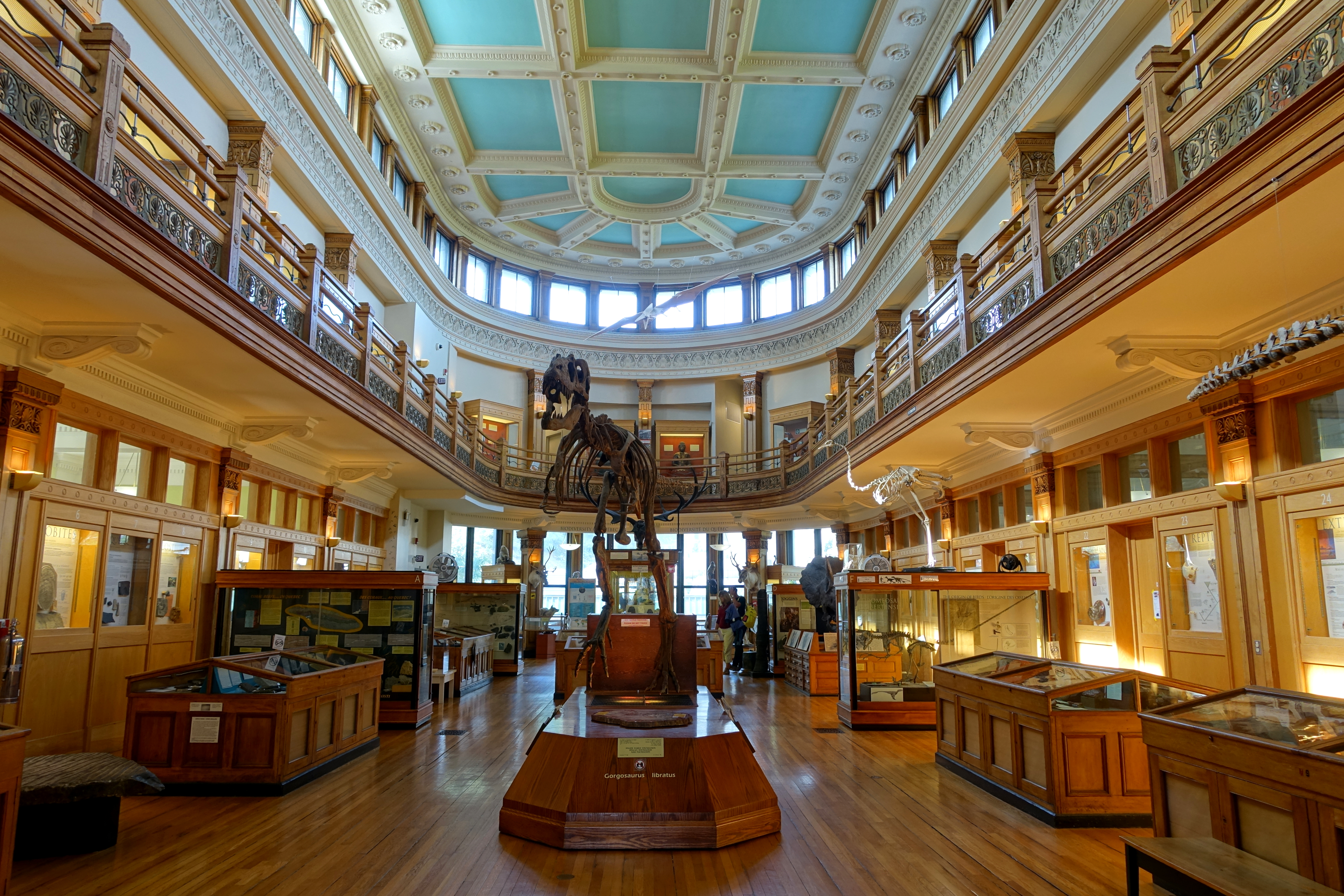
Interior of the museum

The Redpath Museum is a museum of natural history belonging to McGill University and located on the university's campus on Sherbrooke Street West in Montreal, Quebec, Canada. It was built in 1882 as a gift from the sugar baron Peter Redpath.

It houses collections of interest to ethnology, biology, paleontology, and mineralogy/geology. The collections were started by some of the same individuals who founded the Smithsonian and Royal Ontario Museum collections. The current director is Catherine Turgeon. Commissioned by Redpath to mark the 25th anniversary of Sir John William Dawson's appointment as principal, the museum was designed by A.C. Hutchison and A.D. Steele. McGill University's Redpath Museum website characterizes it as an "idiosyncratic expression of eclectic Victorian Classicism" as well as "an unusual and late example of the Greek Revival in North America."

It is the oldest building built specifically to be a museum in Canada. Both the museum's interior and exterior have been utilized as a set, for movies and commercials.

== Collections ==
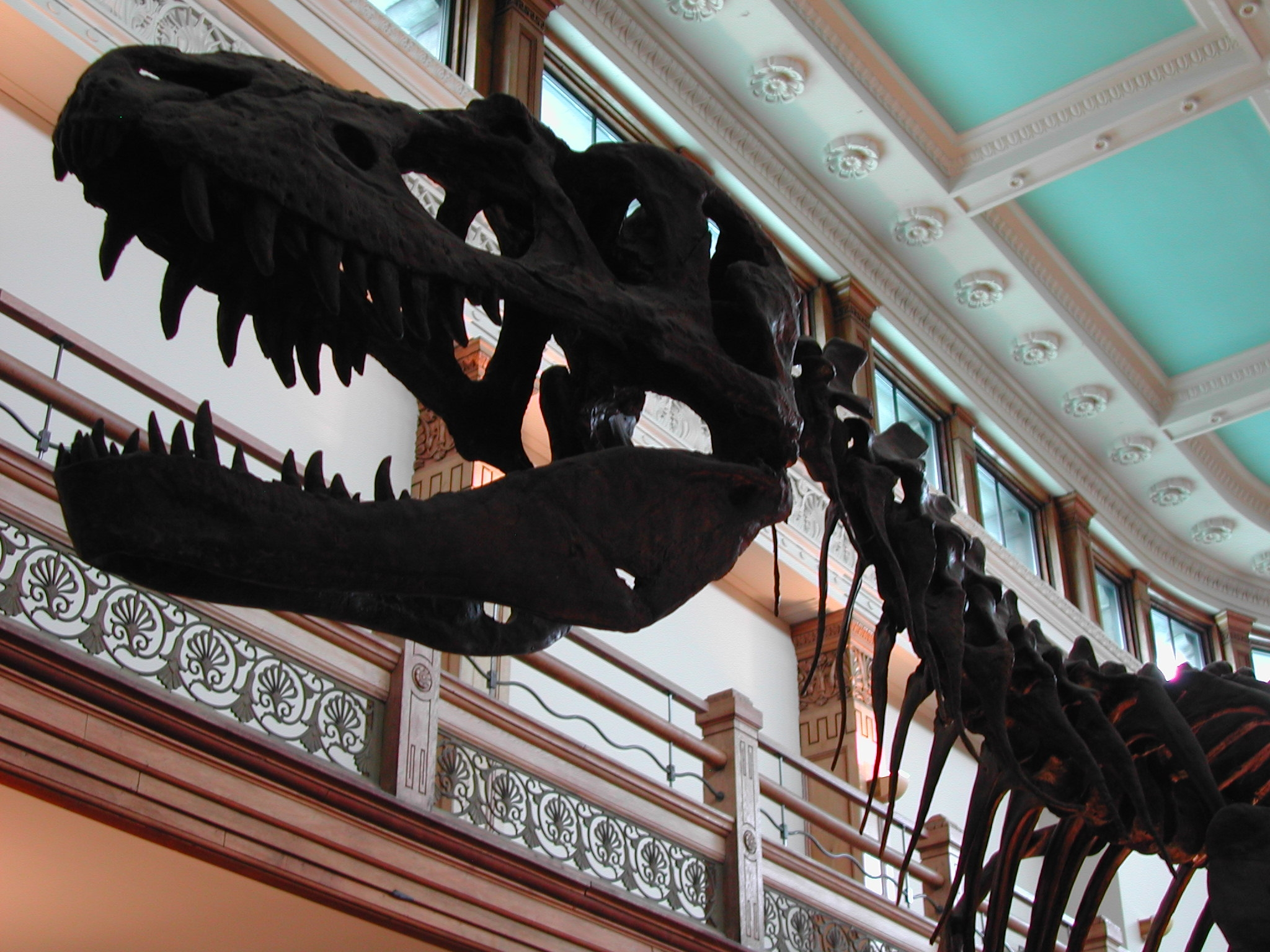
Signature dinosaur skeleton within the Redpath Museum, set against interior Beaux Art decorations

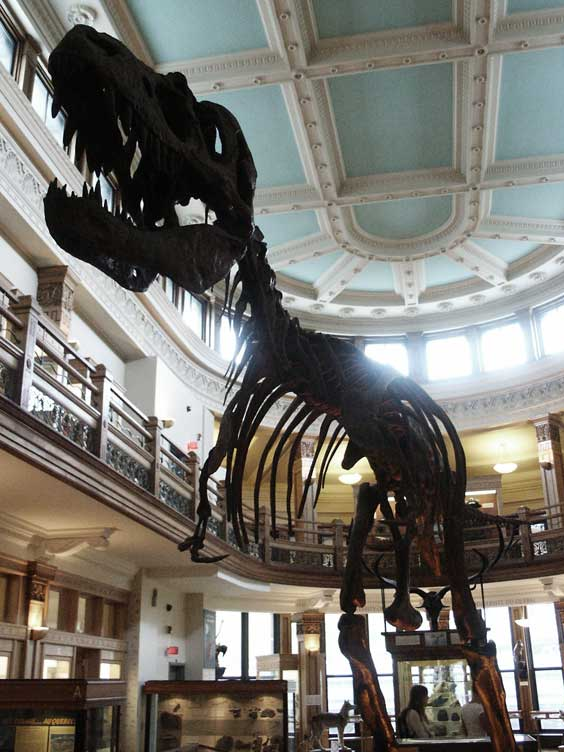
View of the Gorgosaurus in the central evolution exhibit atrium

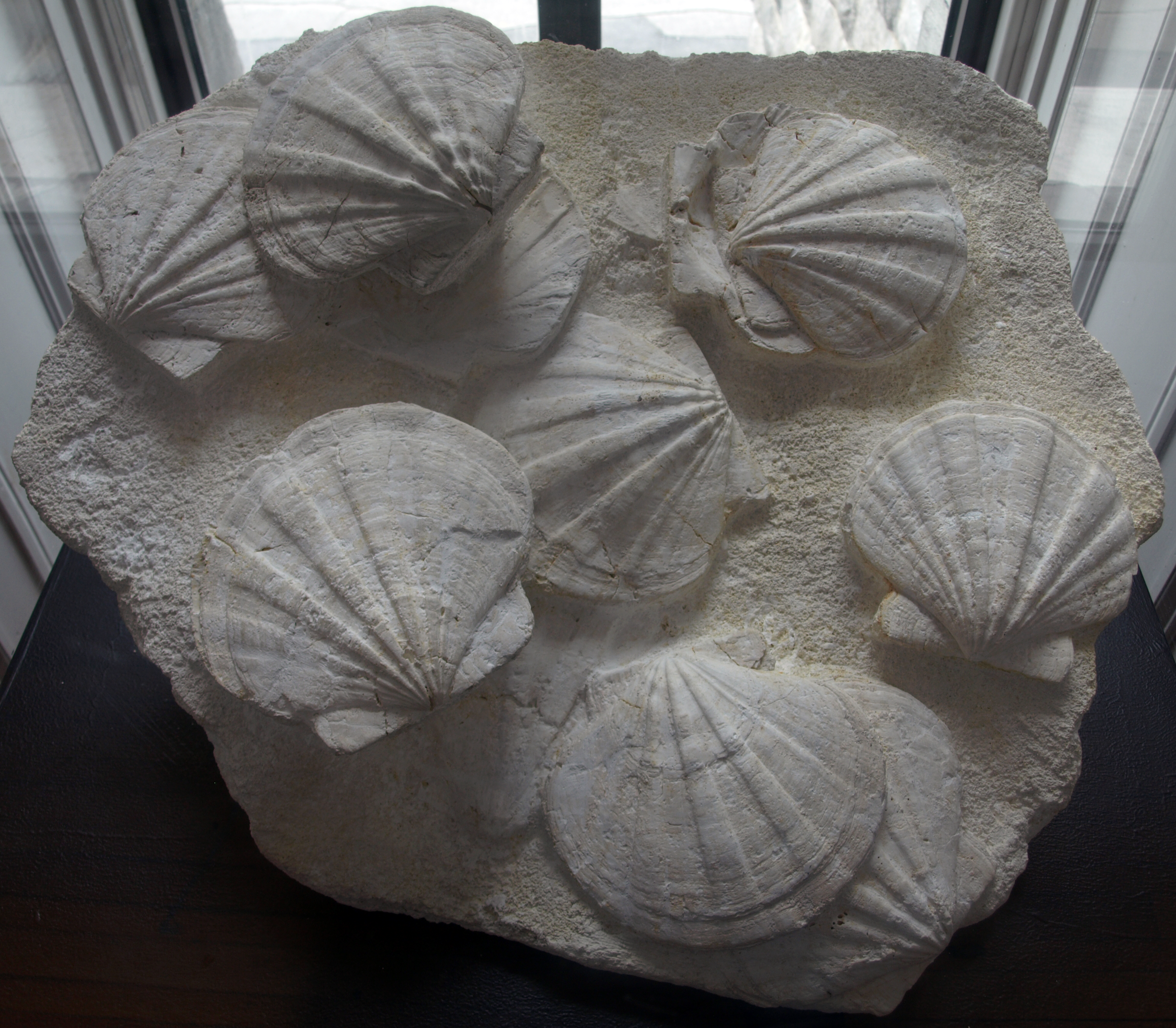
Redpath Museum Collection – fossilized scallops

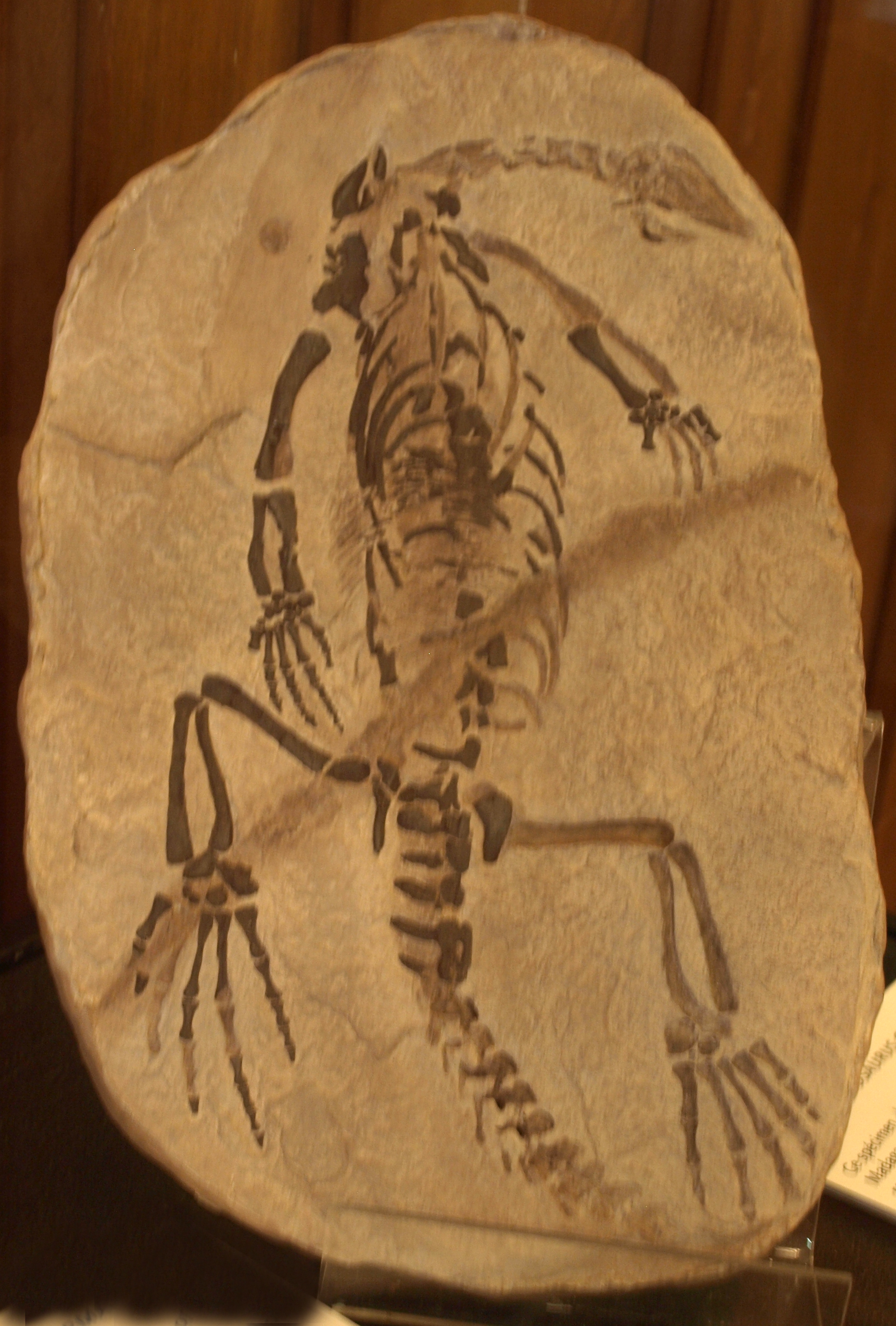
Redpath Museum Collection – Claudiosaurus germaini

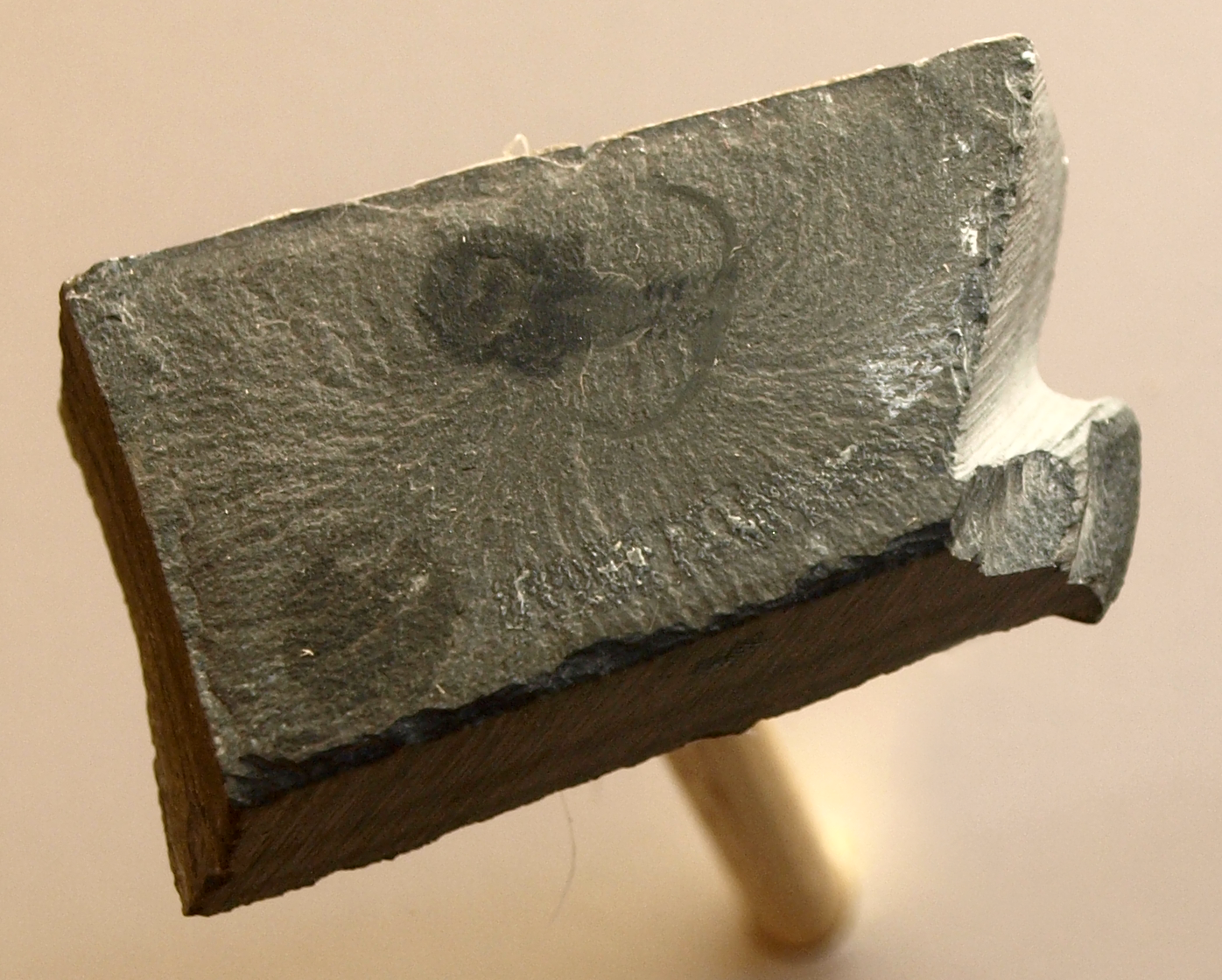
Redpath Museum Collection – Marrella splendens

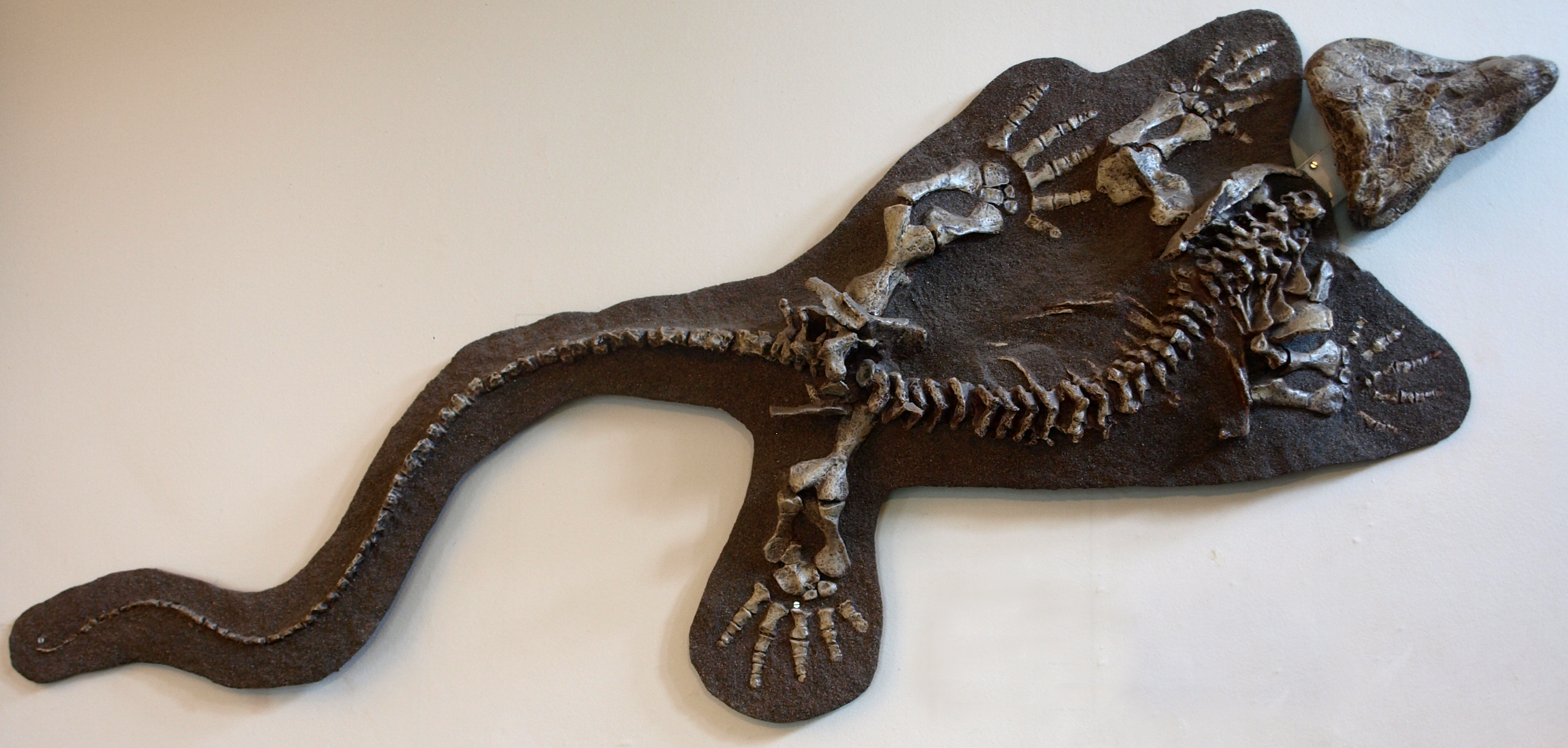
Redpath Museum Collection – Limnoscelis

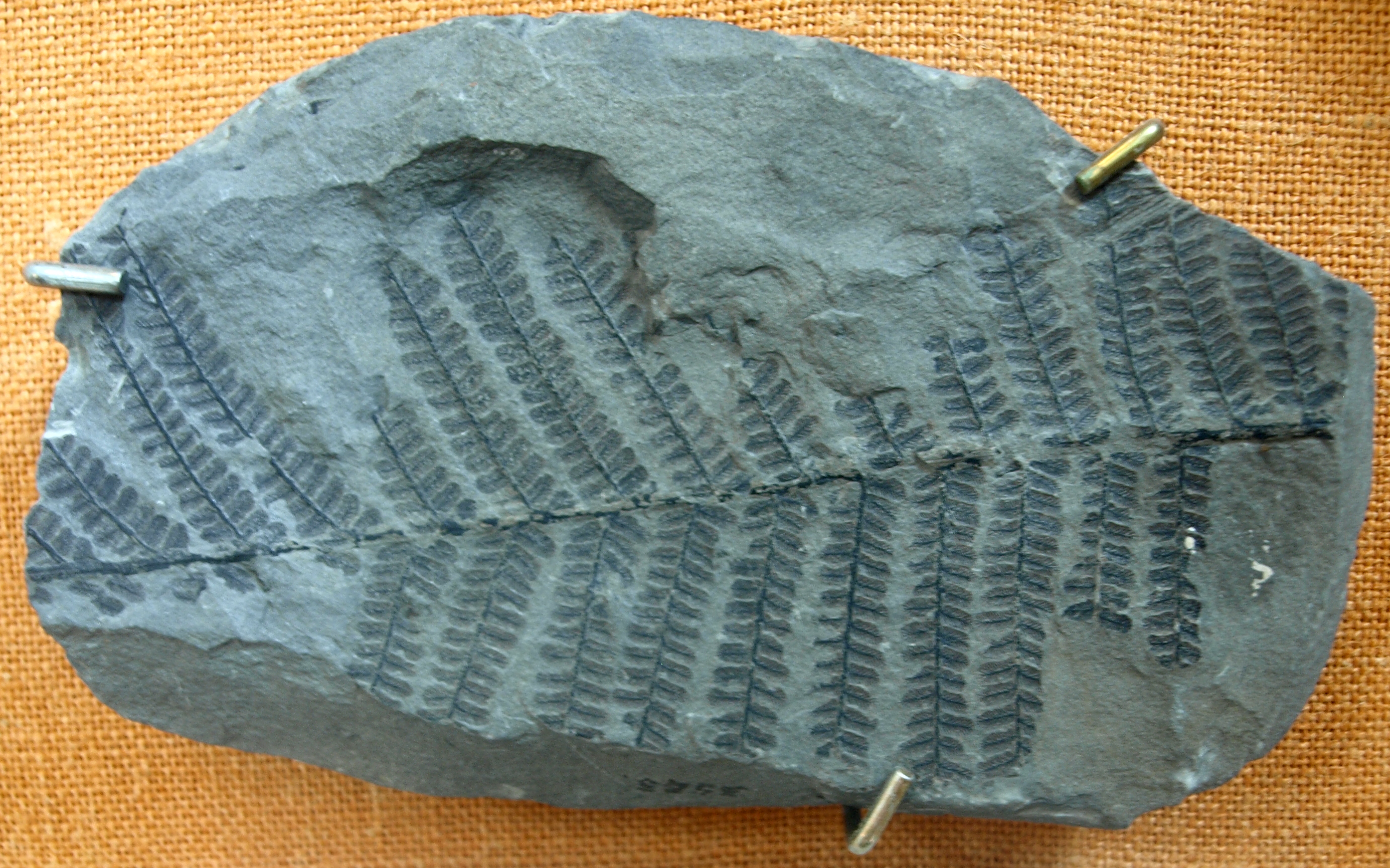
Redpath Museum Collection – Pecopteris bucklandi

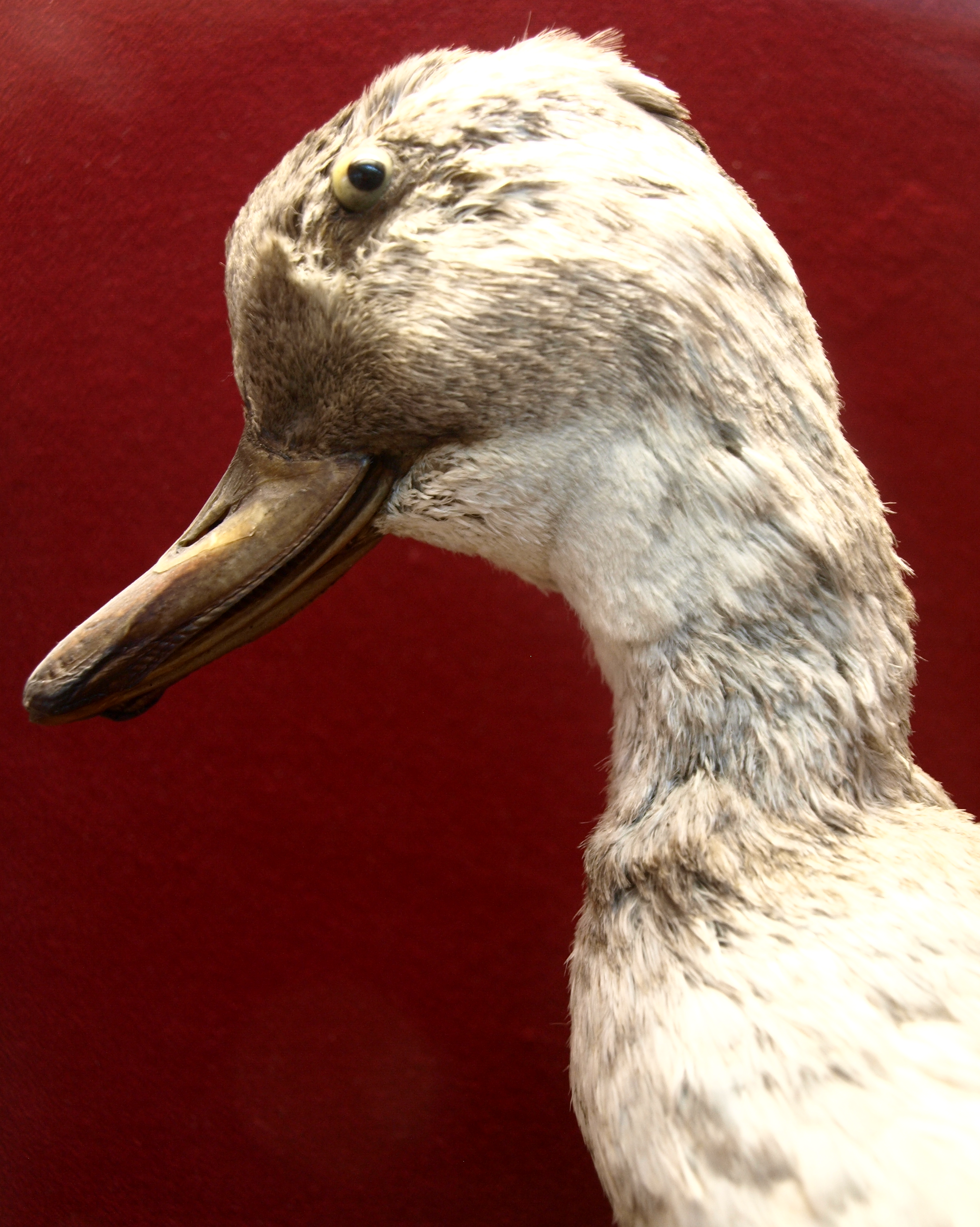
Redpath Museum Collection – Labrador duck

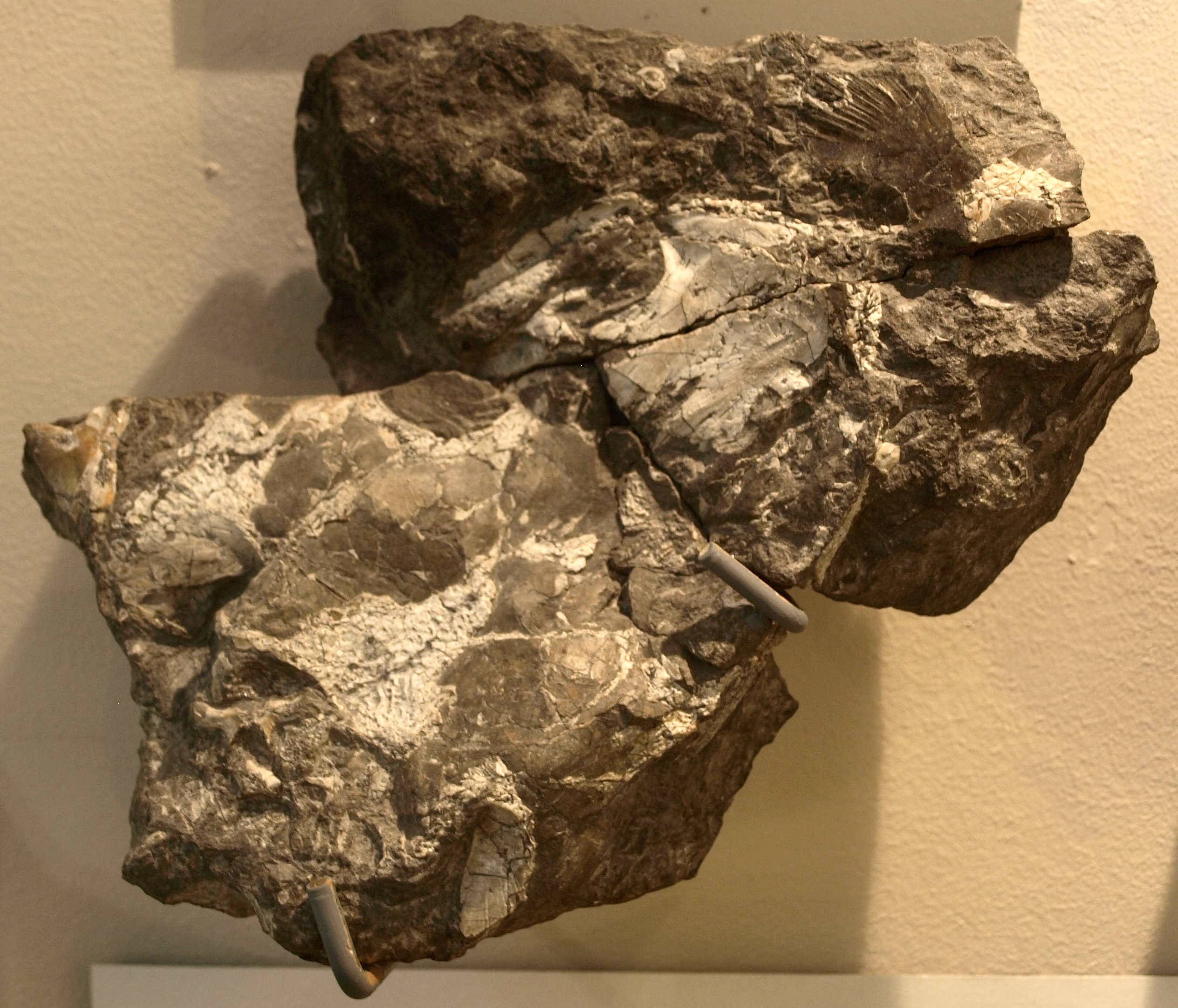
Redpath Museum Collection – Dendrerpeton

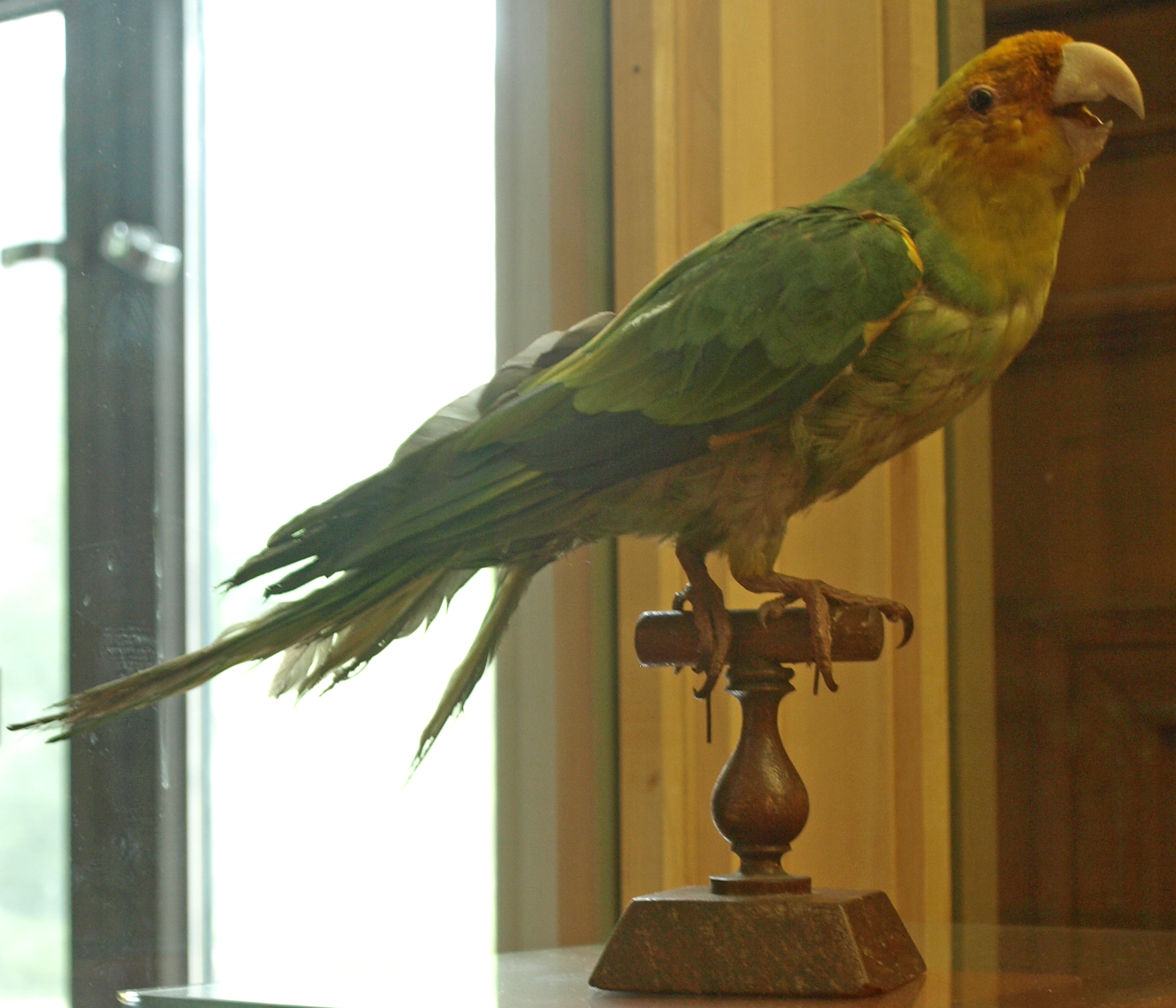
Redpath Museum Collection – Carolina parakeet

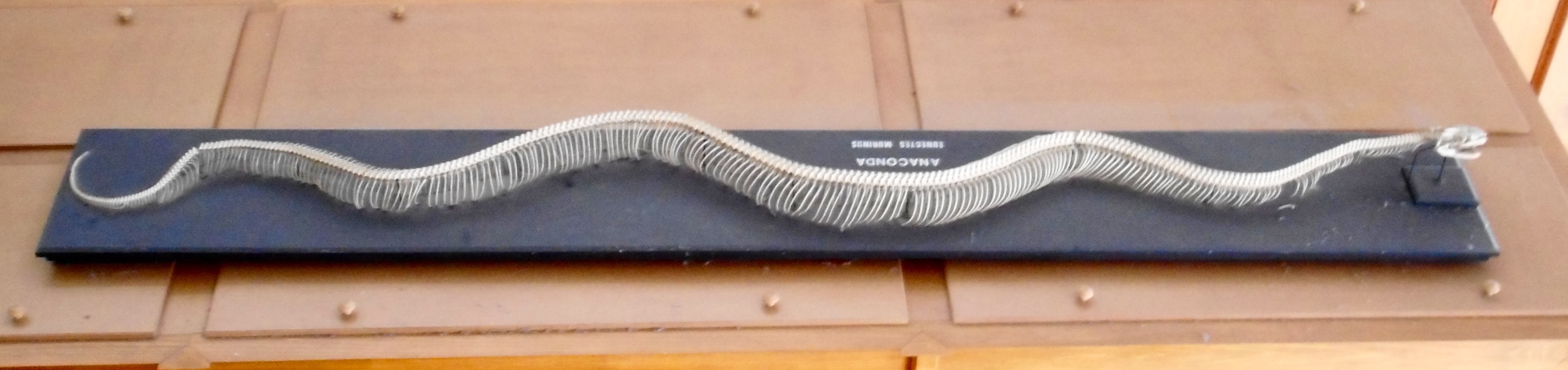
Skeleton of an anaconda

=== Geology (mineralogy) ===
Five collections, containing approximately 16,000 specimens from all over the world, are identified by their initial letters:

- 'D' Doell collection for Dr Donald Doell, a physician who contributed many of the more recent materials in the collection.
- 'F' Ferrier collection for Walter Frederick Ferrier, famous mining engineer who contributed this pre-eminent collection of minerals from many classic locations.
- 'J' Jeffrey collection for Jeffrey de Fourestier, mineralogist and former volunteer at the museum.
- 'P' Palache collection for Charles Palache, mineralogist and Harvard professor.
- 'SC' Shirley Collection for the wife of Sir Hugh Graham, 1st Baron Atholstan who donated the collection in the early 1880s.
- 'NS' New System collection for the general collection catalogue. This collection contains the main body of specimens including the collection of the former Natural History Society of Montreal and specimens from the collection of Lord Strathcona.

=== Entomology ===
The Lyman entomology collections were transferred in 1961 by D. Keith McE. Kevan to Macdonald Campus in Sainte Anne-de-Bellevue, leading to the creation of the Lyman Entomological Museum and Research Laboratory.

=== Paleontology ===
The museum's important collection of fossils owes much of its beginning to Sir William Dawson who provided not only many of the fossils of plants from his native Nova Scotia, but procured many important specimens from around the world. Dr Thomas Clark, for many years up until his death, was a fixture at the museum and was renowned for his pioneering work on fossils from the Burgess Shale, some of the oldest known anywhere.

=== Ethnology ===
The ethnological and archaeological collection is one of the oldest in North America and began with Sir William Dawson's collection. It received further material from the Natural History Society of Montreal. It now has over 17,000 items from Africa, ancient Egypt, Oceania, paleolithic Europe and South America. The collection of First Nations artifacts that were once part of the collection now are housed in the nearby McCord Museum in Montreal.

== Affiliations ==
The museum is affiliated with CMA, CHIN, and Virtual Museum of Canada.

== Metro ==
The museum, accessible by walking from many downtown Montreal locations, is also near the McGill station on the Montreal Metro Green Line.

== See also ==
- Redpath Library
- George Barnston
