= John William Dawson =

Canadian geologist and university administrator (1820–1899)

Sir John William Dawson CMG FRS FRSE FGS FRSC
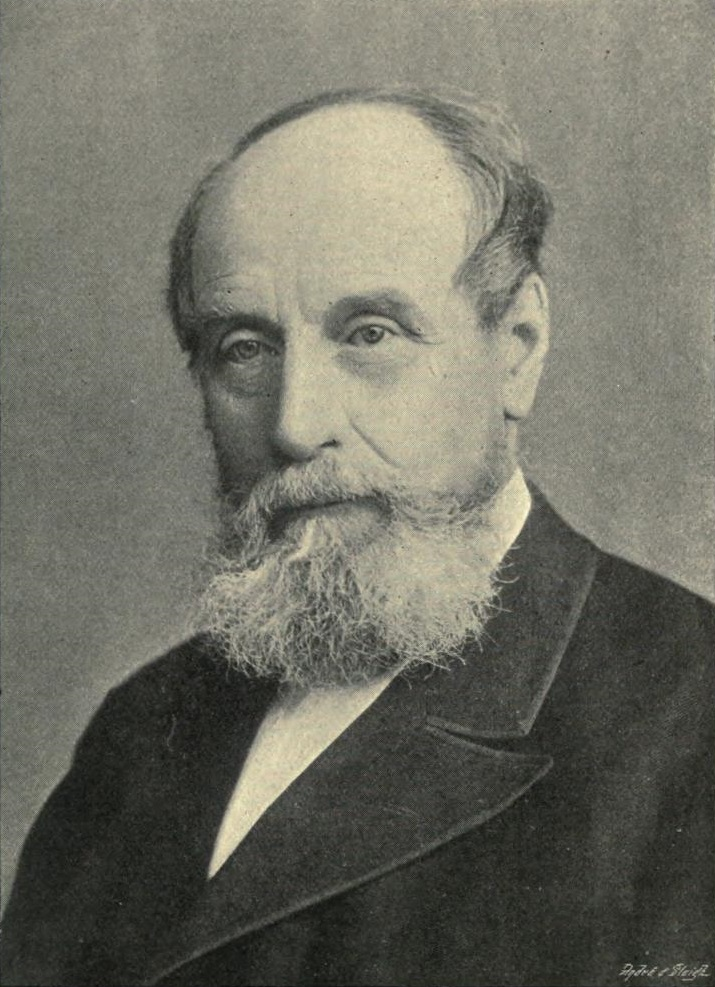
- Born: 13 October 1820; Pictou, Nova Scotia
- Died: 19 November 1899 (aged 79); Montreal, Quebec, Canada
- Education: University of Edinburgh
- Known for: Eozoon canadense; Hylonomus
- Awards: Lyell Medal (1881)
- Scientific career
- Fields: Geology
- Workplaces: McGill University
- Author abbrev. (botany): Dawson

Signature
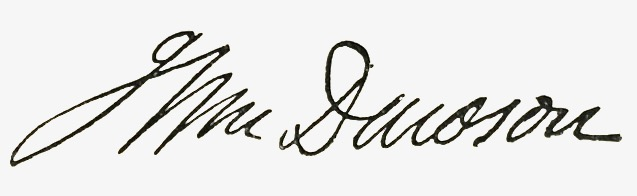

Sir John William Dawson CMG FRS FRSE FGS FRSC (1820–1899) was a Canadian geologist and university administrator.

== Life and work ==
John William Dawson was born on 13 October 1820 in Pictou, Nova Scotia, where he attended and graduated from Pictou Academy. Of Scottish descent, Dawson attended the University of Edinburgh to complete his education, and graduated in 1842, having gained a knowledge of geology and natural history from Robert Jameson.

Dawson returned to Nova Scotia in 1842, accompanying Sir Charles Lyell on his first visit to that territory. Dawson was subsequently appointed as Nova Scotia's first superintendent of education. Holding the post from 1850 to 1853, he was an energetic reformer of school design, teacher education and curriculum. Influenced by the American educator Henry Barnard, Dawson published a pamphlet titled, "School Architecture; abridged from Barnard's School Architecture" in 1850. One of the many schools built to his design, the Mount Hanley Schoolhouse still survives today, including the "Dawson Desks" named after him. Dawson's travels as school superintendent allowed him to deepen his geological studies, as he visited and studied geological sites across the region, leading to publication of his classic "Acadian Geology" (1855 and subsequent editions). He entered zealously into the geology of Canada, making a special study of the fossil forests of the coal-measures of Joggins, Nova Scotia, now a UNESCO World Heritage Site. During the course of his second exploration of the cliffs with Charles Lyell in 1852, he discovered the remains of a tetrapod named Dendrerpeton entombed within a fossil tree. Over the years, he continued his exploration of the fossil trees, eventually unearthing the oldest known reptile in the history of life, which he named Hylonomus lyelli in honour of his mentor.

From 1855 to 1893 he was professor of geology and principal of McGill University in Montreal, an institution which under his influence attained a high reputation. In 1859 he published a seminal paper describing the first fossil plant found in rocks of Devonian origin. Although his discovery did not have the impact that might have been expected at the time, he is now considered one of the founders of the science of palaeobotany. He later described the fossil plants of the Silurian, Devonian and Carboniferous rocks of Canada for the Geological Survey of Canada (1871–1873). He was elected FRS (Fellow of the Royal Society) in 1862. When the Royal Society of Canada was created he was the first to occupy the presidential chair, and he also acted as president of the British Association at its meeting at Birmingham in 1886, president of the American Association for the Advancement of Science in 1882, and president of the Geological Society of America in 1893.

Sir William Dawson's name is especially associated with Eozoon canadense, which in 1865 he described as an organism having the structure of a foraminifer. It was found in the Laurentian rocks, regarded as the oldest known geological system. His views on the subject were contested at the time, and have since been disproven, the so-called organism being now regarded as a mineral structure.

He was appointed CMG in 1881, and was knighted in 1884. In 1886 he was awarded honorary membership of the Manchester Literary and Philosophical Society,

In 1882, while looking to fill the vacancy left at McGill by the death of botanist James Barnston, Dawson contacted Asa Gray of Harvard University for recommendations. Gray suggested his former assistant David P. Penhallow, whom Dawson accepted as a lecturer.

He died in Montreal, 19 November 1899, and was buried in Mount Royal Cemetery. Lady Dawson served as President of the Ladies' Bible Association. Lady Dawson cofounded the Ladies' Educational Institute of Montreal with Mrs. John Molson and others. Sir William and Lady Dawson had several sons. The eldest, George Mercer Dawson, served as Director of the Geological Survey of Canada in 1895.

He is interred in the Mount Royal Cemetery in Montreal, Quebec, and is the namesake for Dawson College. The mineral dawsonite, which was discovered during the building of the Redpath Museum with which he was intimately related, is named in his honour.

== Creationism ==
As a Christian, Dawson spoke against Charles Darwin's theory of evolution and came to write The Origin of the World, According to Revelation and Science (1877) and Facts and Fancies in Modern Science: Studies of the Relations of Science to Prevalent Speculations and Religious Belief (1882) where he discussed how science and religion (particularly Christian Revelation) were complementary in his view. In his books on geological subjects he maintained a distinctly theological attitude, refusing the theory of human evolution from brute ancestors, and holding that the human species only made its appearance on this earth within quite recent times. Like Arnold Henry Guyot, Hugh Miller, and James Dwight Dana, he defended day-age creationism.

Dawson wrote many religious articles. He attacked evolution in the last two chapters of his book, The Story of the Earth and Man.

== Publications ==
Besides many memoirs in the Transactions of learned societies, he published several books:

- Dawson, Sir John William (1855). Acadian geology: an account of the geological and mineral structure and mineral resources of Nova Scotia and portions of the neighbouring provinces of British America.
- Dawson, Sir John William (1863). Air-breathers of the Coal Period: A Descriptive Account of the Remains of Land Animals Found in the Coal Formation of Nova Scotia, with Remarks on Their Bearing on Theories of the Formation of Coal and of the Origin of Species.
- The Story of the Earth and Man. 1873. Also The Story of the Earth and Man at Google Books
- Dawson, Sir John William (1875). The Dawn of Life: Being the History of the Oldest Known Fossil Remains, and Their Relations to Geological Time and to the Development of the Animal Kingdom.
- The Origin of the World, According to Revelation and Science. New York, Harper. 1877.
- Fossil Men and Their Modern Representatives. 1880.
- Facts and Fancies in Modern Science. Philadelphia, American Baptist Publication Society. 1882.
- Modern Science in Bible Lands. London, Hodder & Stoughton. 1895.
- The Geological History of Plants. New York, D. Appleton and Company. 1888. Also The Geological History of Plants at Google Books
- Dawson, Sir John William (1890). Modern Ideas of Evolution as Related to Revelation and Science. London: Religious Tract Society. (1977 reprint ISBN 978-0-88202-167-6)
- Dawson, Sir John William (1891). The Geology of Nova Scotia, New Brunswick and Prince Edward Island: Or, Acadian Geology.
- Dawson, Sir John William (1893). The Canadian Ice Age: Being Notes on the Pleistocene Geology of Canada, with Especial Reference to the Life of the Period and Its Climatal Conditions.
- Dawson, Sir John William (1894). The Meeting-place of Geology and History.
- Dawson, Sir John William (1901). Fifty Years of Work in Canada, Scientific and Educational. (published posthumously)

== Family ==
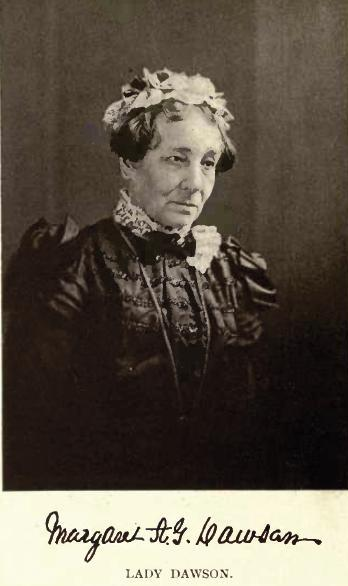
Lady Margaret Dawson by William Notman

John William Dawson married Margaret A. Y. Mercer, daughter of G. Mercer, of Edinburgh, Scotland in March 1847. The couple lived at 293 University Street, Montreal. One of John's sons, George Mercer Dawson (1849–1901), became a well known and respected scientist and geologist in his own right.

== Bibliography ==
- Dawson, William (1901). Fifty Years of Work in Canada. London: Ballantyne, Hanson & Co.- Edited by Rankine Dawson
- Dawson, William (1890). Modern Ideas of Evolution as Related to Revelation and Science. Religious Tract Society (reissued by Cambridge University Press, 2009; ISBN 978-1-108-00023-9)

Academic offices
Preceded by Edmund Allen Meredith	Principal of McGill University; 1855–1893	Succeeded by William Peterson
Professional and academic associations
New institution	President of the Royal Society of Canada; 1882–1883	Succeeded by Pierre-Joseph-Olivier Chauveau
Preceded by Grove Karl Gilbert	President of the Geological Society of America; 1893	Succeeded by Thomas Chrowder Chamberlin
