= Eucamptognathus toulgoeti =

Scientific classification
- Domain: Eukaryota
- Kingdom: Animalia
- Phylum: Arthropoda
- Class: Insecta
- Order: Coleoptera
- Suborder: Adephaga
- Family: Carabidae
- Genus: Eucamptognathus
- Species: E. toulgoeti

Binomial name
- Eucamptognathus toulgoeti Deuve, 1986

Species of beetle

Eucamptognathus toulgoeti is a species of ground beetle in the subfamily Pterostichinae. It was described by Deuve in 1986.
