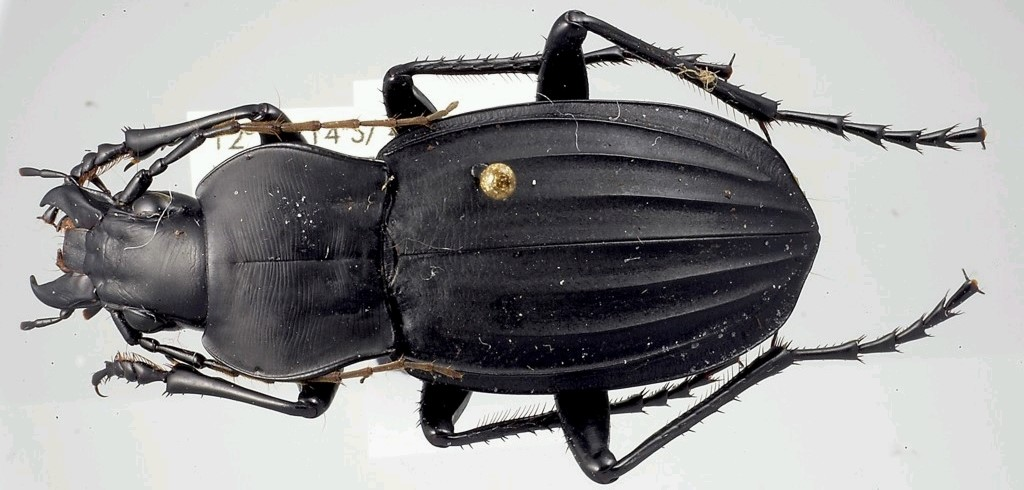
- Eucamptognathus opacus

Scientific classification
- Kingdom: Animalia
- Phylum: Arthropoda
- Class: Insecta
- Order: Coleoptera
- Suborder: Adephaga
- Family: Carabidae
- Subfamily: Pterostichinae
- Genus: Eucamptognathus; Chaudoir, 1837

= Eucamptognathus =

Genus of beetles

Eucamptognathus is a genus of beetles in the family Carabidae, containing the following species:

- Eucamptognathus africanus (Castelnau, 1835)
- Eucamptognathus alluaudi Fairmaire, 1895
- Eucamptognathus andriai Deuve, 1982
- Eucamptognathus andringitricus Deuve, 1982
- Eucamptognathus androyanus Tschitscherine, 1903
- Eucamptognathus aterrimus Mateu, 1958
- Eucamptognathus badeni (Putzeys, 1877)
- Eucamptognathus bastardi Jeannel, 1948
- Eucamptognathus betsileus Jeannel, 1948
- Eucamptognathus boucardi (Tschitscherine, 1890)
- Eucamptognathus bouvieri Tschitscherine, 1900
- Eucamptognathus brevicornis (Fairmaire, 1869)
- Eucamptognathus catalai Jeannel, 1948
- Eucamptognathus chaudoirii (Fairmaire, 1868)
- Eucamptognathus colasi Deuve, 1982
- Eucamptognathus conspicuus Mateu, 1958
- Eucamptognathus costatus Mateu, 1958
- Eucamptognathus crassus Jeannel, 1948
- Eucamptognathus curvicrus Tschitscherine, 1898
- Eucamptognathus decaryi Jeannel, 1948
- Eucamptognathus diacritus (Alluaud, 1913)
- Eucamptognathus dieganus Alluaud, 1897
- Eucamptognathus diversus Chaudoir, 1874
- Eucamptognathus dostojewskii (Tschitscherine, 1897)
- Eucamptognathus emarginatus (Putzeys, 1877)
- Eucamptognathus erinnys (Tschitscherine, 1893)
- Eucamptognathus extremus Jeannel, 1955
- Eucamptognathus fairmairei Alluaud, 1926
- Eucamptognathus foveatus Jeannel, 1948
- Eucamptognathus freyi Straneo, 1960
- Eucamptognathus gigas (Basilewsky, 1967)
- Eucamptognathus granulifer Tschitscherine, 1900
- Eucamptognathus griveaudi (Basilewsky, 1967)
- Eucamptognathus haplosternus (Fairmaire, 1869)
- Eucamptognathus howa Tschitscherine, 1899
- Eucamptognathus ikopae Tschitscherine, 1900
- Eucamptognathus insolitus Mateu, 1958
- Eucamptognathus jeanneli Basilewsky, 1946
- Eucamptognathus laevipennis Jeannel, 1948
- Eucamptognathus lafertei Chevrolat, 1839
- Eucamptognathus lambertoni Alluaud, 1926
- Eucamptognathus lesnei Tschitscherine, 1900
- Eucamptognathus macrocephalus Deuve, 1981
- Eucamptognathus madagascariensis Mateu, 1958
- Eucamptognathus madecassus Mateu, 1958
- Eucamptognathus mananarensis Deuve, 1982
- Eucamptognathus mananjaryanus Mateu, 1958
- Eucamptognathus marovoayensis Deuve, 1981
- Eucamptognathus mateui Straneo, 1960
- Eucamptognathus mediocris Mateu, 1958
- Eucamptognathus minor (Harold, 1879)
- Eucamptognathus modestus Tschitscherine, 1903
- Eucamptognathus moerens Tschitscherine, 1903
- Eucamptognathus neoleptus Alluaud, 1926
- Eucamptognathus nigriceps Jeannel, 1948
- Eucamptognathus notabilis Mateu, 1958
- Eucamptognathus obtusiangulus Jeannel, 1948
- Eucamptognathus oopterus Tschitscherine, 1898
- Eucamptognathus opacus (Fairmaire, 1892)
- Eucamptognathus parallelus Deuve, 1986
- Eucamptognathus parapunctatipennis Mateu, 1958
- Eucamptognathus parvulus Deuve, 1981
- Eucamptognathus pauliani Mateu, 1958
- Eucamptognathus perichrysis Jeannel, 1948
- Eucamptognathus pernix Deuve, 1981
- Eucamptognathus perrieri Jeannel, 1948
- Eucamptognathus planatus Jeannel, 1948
- Eucamptognathus planipennis Deuve, 1986
- Eucamptognathus porphyrus Alluaud, 1926
- Eucamptognathus prasinus Alluaud, 1897
- Eucamptognathus pseudoboucardi Mateu, 1958
- Eucamptognathus pseudojeanneli Deuve, 1986
- Eucamptognathus pseudomadecassus Deuve, 1986
- Eucamptognathus psilonyx Alluaud, 1926
- Eucamptognathus punctatipennis Jeannel, 1948
- Eucamptognathus rutilans Jeannel, 1948
- Eucamptognathus satelles Tschitscherine, 1903
- Eucamptognathus septentrionalis Jeannel, 1948
- Eucamptognathus seyrigi Jeannel, 1948
- Eucamptognathus sicardi Alluaud, 1932
- Eucamptognathus sinuatus Jeannel, 1948
- Eucamptognathus sogai Deuve, 1986
- Eucamptognathus spectabilis (Castelnau, 1835)
- Eucamptognathus spernax Tschitscherine, 1903
- Eucamptognathus subiridescens (Basilewsky, 1967)
- Eucamptognathus subviolaceus Tschitscherine, 1898
- Eucamptognathus tenuistriatus Fairmaire, 1895
- Eucamptognathus thoracicus Alluaud, 1932
- Eucamptognathus toulgoeti Deuve, 1986
- Eucamptognathus tristis Deuve, 1981
- Eucamptognathus trisulcatus (Bates, 1879)
- Eucamptognathus tsaratananae Jeannel, 1948
- Eucamptognathus tshitsherini Alluaud, 1916
- Eucamptognathus vadoni Jeannel, 1948
- Eucamptognathus vadonianus Deuve, 1982
- Eucamptognathus viettei Deuve, 1981
- Eucamptognathus villiersi Mateu, 1958
- Eucamptognathus violaceus Jeannel, 1948
- Eucamptognathus viridanus Mateu, 1958
