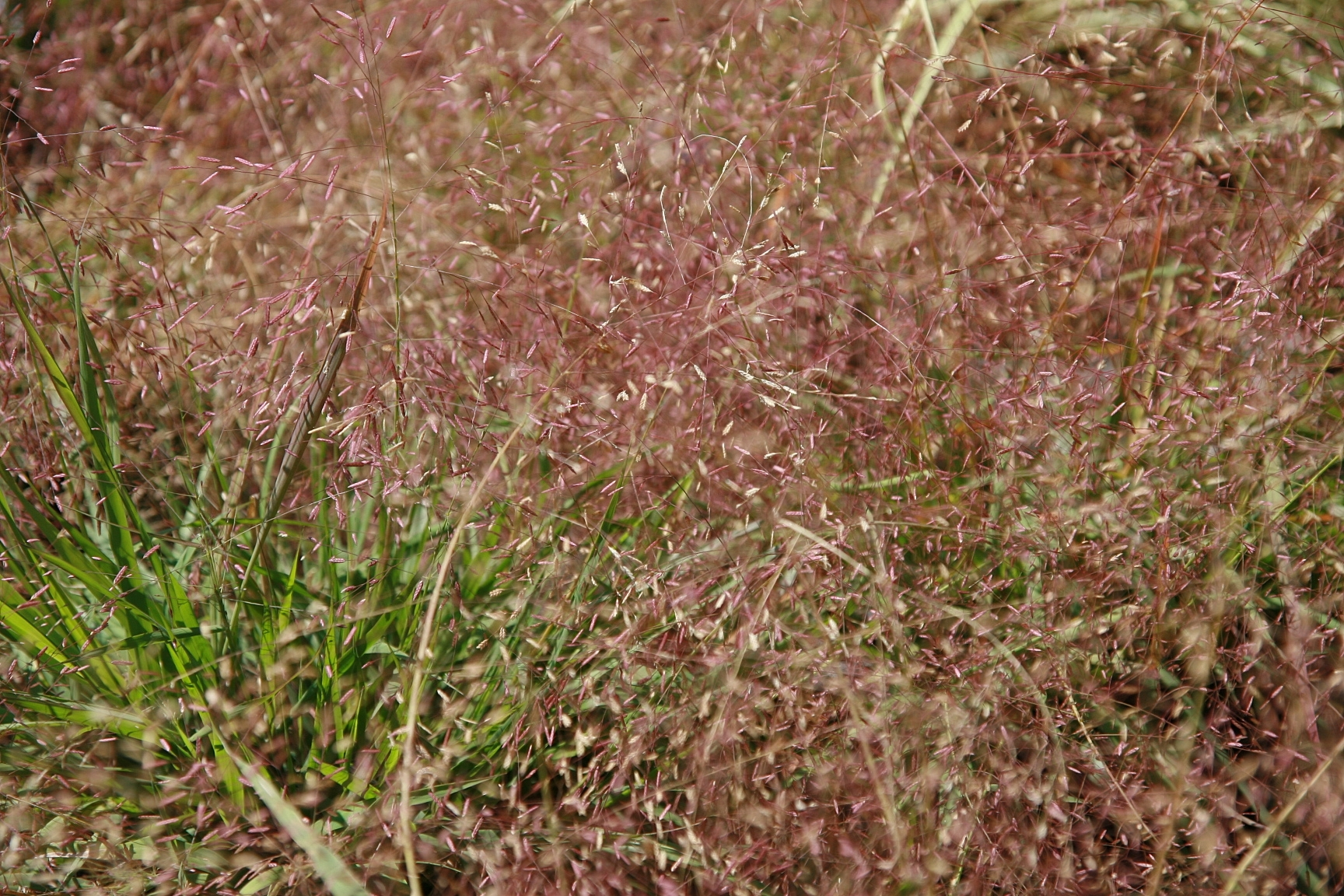
- Plant at time of blooming
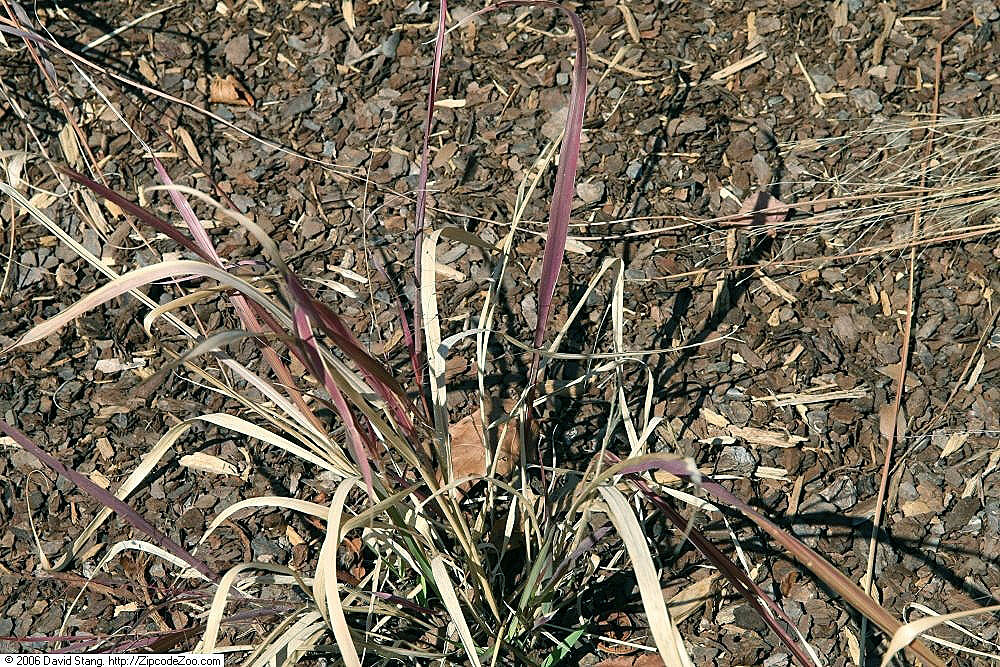
- Plant in late fall

Scientific classification
- Kingdom: Plantae
- Clade: Tracheophytes
- Clade: Angiosperms
- Clade: Monocots
- Clade: Commelinids
- Order: Poales
- Family: Poaceae
- Subfamily: Chloridoideae
- Genus: Eragrostis
- Species: E. spectabilis

Binomial name
- Eragrostis spectabilis (Pursh) Steud.

Synonyms
- List: "Eragrostis spectabilis var. sparsihirsuta"; "Poa spectabilis"; "Tumblegrass"; "Eragrostide brillante"

= Eragrostis spectabilis =

Species of flowering plant

Eragrostis spectabilis, known as purple lovegrass, is a species of flowering plant in the family Poaceae, native from southern Canada to northeastern Mexico. It was first described by Frederick Traugott Pursh in 1813 as Poa spectabilis, and transferred to Eragrostis by Ernst von Steudel in 1840.

It is readily eaten by browsing and grazing animals.

== Description ==
Eragrostis spectabilis is an upright, tufted grass that grows from 30 to 70 cm tall. Its leaves may reach a length between 20 and 45 centimeters (approximately 7.9 to 17.7 inches) and are densely hairy.

Its common name, purple love grass, comes from its inflorescence towards the top of the stem. They bloom in late summer to early fall, turn purple, and contain the seeds. As the plant continues to mature, the inflorescence will often break off, and its movement will disperse the seeds. These seeds are reddish-brown and tend to be 0.6-0.8 mm long. During the fall after seed dispersal, the plant's stem and branches turn soft brown or tan in color. The inflorescence of Eragrostis spectabilis exhibits a whorled branching structure, with three branches coming off the rachis at a time.

== Distribution and habitat ==
Eragrostis spectabilis is a native to eastern and central North America from Maine to as far west as South Dakota, and south to Florida and Arizona and even down into Mexico. In addition to its native distribution in North America, purple love grass is widely grown in China as an ornamental plant non-natively.

This species is commonly found in woodlands, along roadsides, and within sandy fields. Within the southeastern United States, it has been observed in habitats such as pine woodlands, scrub barrens, and disturbed areas such as in parking lots and along roadsides.

It is most abundant in environments with full sun and moist and sandy soils.

== Ecology ==
Eragrostis spectabilis is a perennial and goes dormant over the winter. It is a C4 grass and prefers sandy soil and disturbed areas such as sandy or gravelly roadsides, plains, and woodlands. Eragrostis spectabilis is also very drought-, salt- and cold-resistant, making it an excellent choice to introduce to roadsides, especially in colder areas with seasonal snowfall; once established, this plant needs little to no additional attention. It prefers full sun, but will tolerate part shade and likes damp to wet soil. It spreads through rhizomes, as well as through seed dispersal both by birds and by the movement of the panicle by the wind; seeds use physiological dormancy and are ready to germinate after a dormancy period of about ten weeks.

== Uses ==
Eragrostis spectabilis is often used in attempts to reintroduce native species in disturbed areas, particularly in plains and hot, sandy areas, as it spreads readily via seeds and has a high dormancy rate(60%) that only increases after its dormancy period; the only problem is that it is not widely available for commercial use and can thus get expensive. Additionally, it is used as an erosion control plant, as its fibrous roots hold soil in place. It can also be used as a lawn alternative in areas with low foot traffic, as it only needs to be mowed a few times per growing season. The dried inflorescences are often used in dried flower arrangements.

Eragrostis spectabilis also attracts several species of birds and butterflies, as well as other pollinators. The seeds are used as a food source for small mammals, such as mice and songbirds, and tend to be high in nutrients. It is also used as a grazing plant both for livestock and wild animals such as deer, and deer also will dig up the basal part of the stem to use as a food source during winter. The plant itself is also often used as both nesting material and cover for smaller animals.
