= Eucamptognathus badeni =

Scientific classification
- Domain: Eukaryota
- Kingdom: Animalia
- Phylum: Arthropoda
- Class: Insecta
- Order: Coleoptera
- Suborder: Adephaga
- Family: Carabidae
- Genus: Eucamptognathus
- Species: E. badeni

Binomial name
- Eucamptognathus badeni (Putzeys, 1877)

Species of beetle

Eucamptognathus badeni is a species of ground beetle in the subfamily Pterostichinae. It was described by Jules Putzeys in 1877.
