= Eucamptognathus africanus =

Scientific classification
- Domain: Eukaryota
- Kingdom: Animalia
- Phylum: Arthropoda
- Class: Insecta
- Order: Coleoptera
- Suborder: Adephaga
- Family: Carabidae
- Genus: Eucamptognathus
- Species: E. africanus

Binomial name
- Eucamptognathus africanus (Castelnau, 1835)

Species of beetle

Eucamptognathus africanus is a species of ground beetle in the subfamily Pterostichinae. It was described by Castelnau in 1835.
