= Eucamptognathus mananjaryanus =

Scientific classification
- Domain: Eukaryota
- Kingdom: Animalia
- Phylum: Arthropoda
- Class: Insecta
- Order: Coleoptera
- Suborder: Adephaga
- Family: Carabidae
- Genus: Eucamptognathus
- Species: E. mananjaryanus

Binomial name
- Eucamptognathus mananjaryanus Mateu, 1958

Species of beetle

Eucamptognathus mananjaryanus is a species of ground beetle in the subfamily Pterostichinae. It was described by entomologist J. Mateu in 1958.
