= Eucamptognathus diacritus =

Scientific classification
- Domain: Eukaryota
- Kingdom: Animalia
- Phylum: Arthropoda
- Class: Insecta
- Order: Coleoptera
- Suborder: Adephaga
- Family: Carabidae
- Genus: Eucamptognathus
- Species: E. diacritus

Binomial name
- Eucamptognathus diacritus (Alluaud, 1913)

Species of beetle

Eucamptognathus diacritus is a species of ground beetle in the subfamily Pterostichinae. It was described by Alluaud in 1913.
