= Eucamptognathus freyi =

Scientific classification
- Kingdom: Animalia
- Phylum: Arthropoda
- Class: Insecta
- Order: Coleoptera
- Suborder: Adephaga
- Family: Carabidae
- Genus: Eucamptognathus
- Species: E. freyi

Binomial name
- Eucamptognathus freyi Straneo, 1960

Species of beetle

Eucamptognathus freyi is a species of ground beetle in the subfamily Pterostichinae. It was described by Straneo in 1960.
