= Eucamptognathus alluaudi =

Scientific classification
- Kingdom: Animalia
- Phylum: Arthropoda
- Class: Insecta
- Order: Coleoptera
- Suborder: Adephaga
- Family: Carabidae
- Genus: Eucamptognathus
- Species: E. alluaudi

Binomial name
- Eucamptognathus alluaudi Fairmaire, 1895

Species of beetle

Eucamptognathus alluaudi is a species of ground beetle in the subfamily Pterostichinae. It was described by Fairmaire in 1895.
