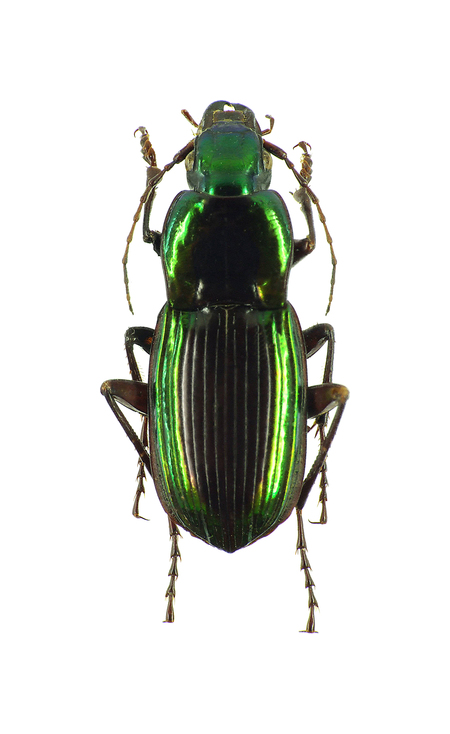

Scientific classification
- Kingdom: Animalia
- Phylum: Arthropoda
- Clade: Pancrustacea
- Class: Insecta
- Order: Coleoptera
- Suborder: Adephaga
- Family: Carabidae
- Genus: Eucamptognathus
- Species: E. lafertei

Binomial name
- Eucamptognathus lafertei Chevrolat, 1839

= Eucamptognathus lafertei =

Species of beetle

Eucamptognathus lafertei is a species of ground beetle in the subfamily Pterostichinae. It was described by Chevrolat in 1839.
