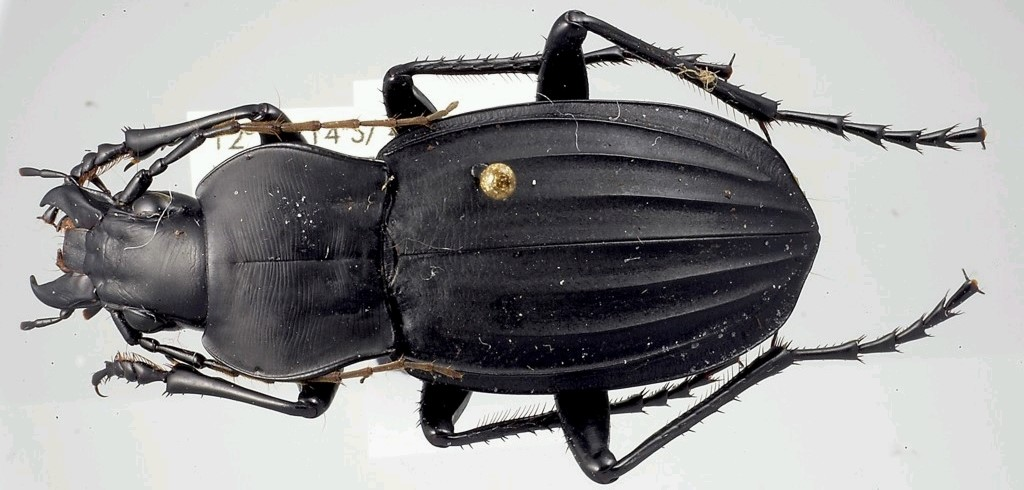

Scientific classification
- Kingdom: Animalia
- Phylum: Arthropoda
- Class: Insecta
- Order: Coleoptera
- Suborder: Adephaga
- Family: Carabidae
- Genus: Eucamptognathus
- Species: E. opacus

Binomial name
- Eucamptognathus opacus (Fairmaire, 1892)

= Eucamptognathus opacus =

Species of beetle

Eucamptognathus opacus is a species of ground beetle in the subfamily Pterostichinae. It was described by Fairmaire in 1892.
