= Eucamptognathus trisulcatus =

Scientific classification
- Domain: Eukaryota
- Kingdom: Animalia
- Phylum: Arthropoda
- Class: Insecta
- Order: Coleoptera
- Suborder: Adephaga
- Family: Carabidae
- Genus: Eucamptognathus
- Species: E. trisulcatus

Binomial name
- Eucamptognathus trisulcatus (Bates, 1879)

Species of beetle

Eucamptognathus trisulcatus is a species of ground beetle in the subfamily Pterostichinae. It was described by Henry Walter Bates in 1879.
