= Eucamptognathus lesnei =

Scientific classification
- Domain: Eukaryota
- Kingdom: Animalia
- Phylum: Arthropoda
- Class: Insecta
- Order: Coleoptera
- Suborder: Adephaga
- Family: Carabidae
- Genus: Eucamptognathus
- Species: E. lesnei

Binomial name
- Eucamptognathus lesnei Tschitscherine, 1900

Species of beetle

Eucamptognathus lesnei is a species of ground beetle in the subfamily Pterostichinae. It was described by Tschitscherine in 1900.
