= Eucamptognathus mateui =

Scientific classification
- Kingdom: Animalia
- Phylum: Arthropoda
- Class: Insecta
- Order: Coleoptera
- Suborder: Adephaga
- Family: Carabidae
- Genus: Eucamptognathus
- Species: E. mateui

Binomial name
- Eucamptognathus mateui Straneo, 1960

Species of beetle

Eucamptognathus mateui is a species of ground beetle in the subfamily Pterostichinae. It was described by Straneo in 1960.
