= Eucamptognathus insolitus =

Scientific classification
- Domain: Eukaryota
- Kingdom: Animalia
- Phylum: Arthropoda
- Class: Insecta
- Order: Coleoptera
- Suborder: Adephaga
- Family: Carabidae
- Genus: Eucamptognathus
- Species: E. insolitus

Binomial name
- Eucamptognathus insolitus Mateu, 1958

Species of beetle

Eucamptognathus insolitus is a species of ground beetle in the subfamily Pterostichinae. It was described by Mateu in 1958.
