= Eucamptognathus brevicornis =

Scientific classification
- Kingdom: Animalia
- Phylum: Arthropoda
- Class: Insecta
- Order: Coleoptera
- Suborder: Adephaga
- Family: Carabidae
- Genus: Eucamptognathus
- Species: E. brevicornis

Binomial name
- Eucamptognathus brevicornis Fairmaire, 1869

Species of beetle

Eucamptognathus brevicornis is a species of ground beetle in the subfamily Pterostichinae. It was described by Fairmaire in 1869.
