= Eucamptognathus subiridescens =

Scientific classification
- Domain: Eukaryota
- Kingdom: Animalia
- Phylum: Arthropoda
- Class: Insecta
- Order: Coleoptera
- Suborder: Adephaga
- Family: Carabidae
- Genus: Eucamptognathus
- Species: E. subiridescens

Binomial name
- Eucamptognathus subiridescens (Basilewsky, 1967)

Species of beetle

Eucamptognathus subiridescens is a species of ground beetle in the subfamily Pterostichinae. It was described by Basilewsky in 1967.
