= Natural History Society of Montreal =

The Natural History Society of Montreal, which ran from 1827 to 1928, was the oldest scientific organisation in Canada, and one of the oldest in North America. Its first meeting took place on May 12, 1827. The first chair of the society was Andrew Fernando Holmes. Other notable members were George Barnston and his son James Barnston and the first recorded Canadian clerk of works, John Mactaggart (1791-1830).

The society published a journal, originally titled the Canadian naturalist and quarterly journal of science (1856-1883) and subsequently the Canadian record of science (1884-1916). The society founded a natural history museum, some of whose collections are now stored in the McGill University Herbarium.
