= Eucamptognathus diversus =

Scientific classification
- Domain: Eukaryota
- Kingdom: Animalia
- Phylum: Arthropoda
- Class: Insecta
- Order: Coleoptera
- Suborder: Adephaga
- Family: Carabidae
- Genus: Eucamptognathus
- Species: E. diversus

Binomial name
- Eucamptognathus diversus Chaudoir, 1874

Species of beetle

Eucamptognathus diversus is a species of ground beetle in the subfamily Pterostichinae. It was described by Maximilien Chaudoir in 1874.
