= Eozoon canadense =

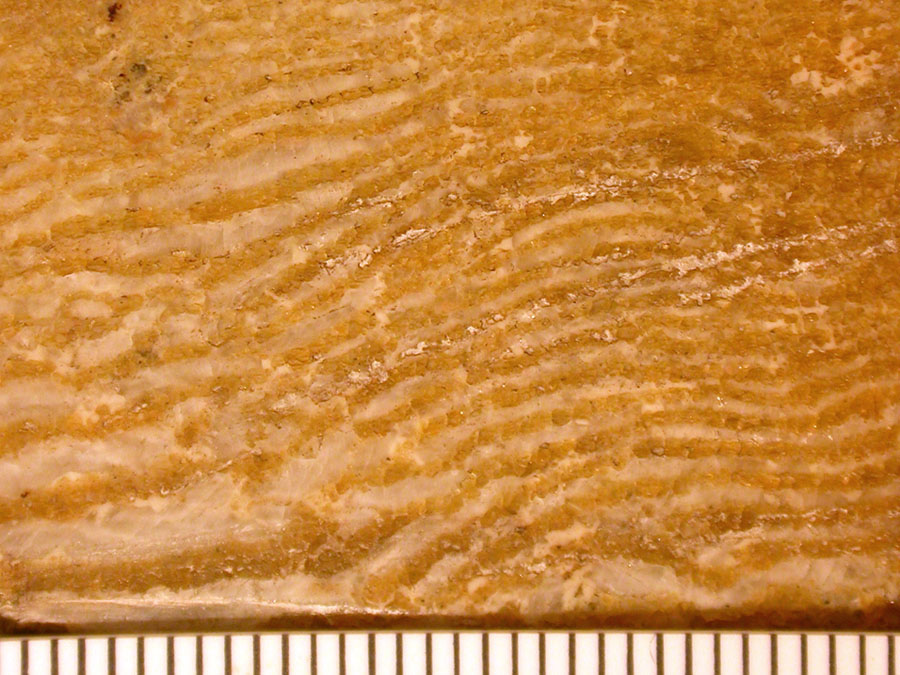
Eozoön canadense from the Precambrian of Canada, a metamorphic rock made of interlayered calcite and serpentine. Scale in mm.

Eozoön canadense (literally, "dawn animal of Canada") is a pseudofossil.

John William Dawson described the banded structures of coarsely crystalline calcite and serpentine as a gigantic Foraminifera, which was thought to be the oldest known fossil (Dawson 1865). It was found in Precambrian metamorphosed limestone of Canada, at Côte St. Pierre near Grenville (Quebec) in 1863. It was later found in several other localities. Dawson called it "one of the brightest gems in the scientific crown of the Geological Survey of Canada". In 1894, it was shown that the place where it was found was associated with metamorphism (O'Brien 1970; Adelman 2007).

Similar Eozoön structures were subsequently found in metamorphosed limestone blocks erupted from Mount Vesuvius, where high-temperature physical and chemical processes were responsible for their formation (O'Brien 1970).
