= Eucamptognathus macrocephalus =

Scientific classification
- Domain: Eukaryota
- Kingdom: Animalia
- Phylum: Arthropoda
- Class: Insecta
- Order: Coleoptera
- Suborder: Adephaga
- Family: Carabidae
- Genus: Eucamptognathus
- Species: E. macrocephalus

Binomial name
- Eucamptognathus macrocephalus Deuve, 1981

Species of beetle

Eucamptognathus macrocephalus is a species of ground beetle in the subfamily Pterostichinae. It was described by Deuve in 1981.
