= Eucamptognathus catalai =

Scientific classification
- Domain: Eukaryota
- Kingdom: Animalia
- Phylum: Arthropoda
- Class: Insecta
- Order: Coleoptera
- Suborder: Adephaga
- Family: Carabidae
- Genus: Eucamptognathus
- Species: E. catalai

Binomial name
- Eucamptognathus catalai Jeannel, 1948

Species of beetle

Eucamptognathus catalai is a species of ground beetle in the subfamily Pterostichinae. It was described by René Jeannel in 1948.
