= Eucamptognathus jeanneli =

Scientific classification
- Domain: Eukaryota
- Kingdom: Animalia
- Phylum: Arthropoda
- Class: Insecta
- Order: Coleoptera
- Suborder: Adephaga
- Family: Carabidae
- Genus: Eucamptognathus
- Species: E. jeanneli

Binomial name
- Eucamptognathus jeanneli Basilewsky, 1946

Species of beetle

Eucamptognathus jeanneli is a species of ground beetle in the subfamily Pterostichinae. It was described by Basilewsky in 1946.
