= Eucamptognathus neoleptus =

Scientific classification
- Domain: Eukaryota
- Kingdom: Animalia
- Phylum: Arthropoda
- Class: Insecta
- Order: Coleoptera
- Suborder: Adephaga
- Family: Carabidae
- Genus: Eucamptognathus
- Species: E. neoleptus

Binomial name
- Eucamptognathus neoleptus Alluaud, 1926

Species of beetle

Eucamptognathus neoleptus is a species of ground beetle in the subfamily Pterostichinae. It was described by Alluaud in 1926.
