= Frederick Traugott Pursh =

German-American botanist (1774–1820)

- Born: Friedrich Traugott Pursh; February 4, 1774; Großenhain, Saxony
- Died: July 11, 1820 (aged 46); Montreal
- Education: Dresden Botanical Gardens
- Known for: Flora americae septentrionalis; or A Systematic Arrangement and Description of The Plants of North America
- Scientific career
- Fields: Botany
- Author abbrev. (botany): Pursh

Frederick Traugott Pursh (or Friedrich Traugott Pursch; February 4, 1774 – July 11, 1820) was a German-American botanist.

Born in Großenhain, in the Electorate of Saxony, under the name Friedrich Traugott Pursh, he was educated at Dresden Botanical Gardens, and emigrated to the United States in 1799. From 1802 to 1805, he worked in Philadelphia as the botanical manager of the extensive gardens of William Hamilton, Esq., "The Woodlands." By 1805, he was working for Benjamin Smith Barton on a new flora of North America, under whom he studied the plants collected on the Lewis and Clark Expedition. His work with Barton allowed him to travel farther afield. In 1805, he traveled south from Maryland to the Carolinas and, in 1806, he traveled north from the mountains of Pennsylvania to New Hampshire. He made both trips principally on foot, with only his dog and a gun, covering over three thousand miles each season.

Barton's proposed flora was never written, but Pursh, who then moved to London, England, did make a major contribution to North American botany in his Flora americae septentrionalis; or A Systematic Arrangement and Description of The Plants of North America (variously dated as published in 1813 or 1814). He then returned to America, moving to Canada in 1816. He botanized a great deal in Quebec, but all the material he accumulated was destroyed by fire before it could be organized into suitable form for publication. His hopes of carrying out further major work were prevented by ill health due to alcoholism.

He was so destitute when he died in Montreal that his funeral expenses had to be defrayed by his friends. His remains lay in the Papineau Road cemetery until 1857, when they were moved to the Mount Royal Cemetery. A proper monument was paid for by subscription. It read as follows:

Frederick Pursh,
Obt. 1820, AEt. 46.
Erected
By Members of the
Natural History Society
of Montreal
1878.

His name is commemorated in the genus Purshia (bitterbush) and in several species, e.g. Rhamnus purshiana.
