= John Barnston =

John Barnston, D.D. (death. 1645), was an English divine.

Barnston was the second son of William Barnston of Churton, Cheshire. He was educated at Brasenose College, Oxford, and became fellow of his college. In 1600–1 he was appointed to the prebend of Bishopstone, Salisbury, and in 1615, being chaplain to Lord Ellesmere, then chancellor of England, he received the degree of D.D. from his university. In 1628 he bestowed certain property in the Strand, London, "sometime a common inn (White Hart), but in 1674 made into a street", to provide 6l. yearly for a lecturer in Hebrew at Brasenose College, Oxford.

He seems also to have bestowed certain properties on the town of Salisbury. Fuller says that he was "a bountiful housekeeper, of a cheerful spirit and peaceable disposition", and tells an anecdote in proof of his assertion. Wood says that he lived to see himself "outed of his spiritualities". There are tablets in memory of his wife, who died in 1625, and of himself in Salisbury Cathedral. The inscription says of John Barnston, "Vixit May 30, 1645; mutavit sæcula, non obiit".
