= George Barnston =

Fur-trader and naturalist

George Barnston (c. 1800 – 14 March 1883) was a fur trader and a naturalist born in Edinburgh, Scotland.

Barnston was trained as a surveyor and army engineer. He joined the North West Company in 1820 and was retained by the Hudson's Bay Company after the 1821 amalgamation. He began his HBC career at York Factory (Manitoba) and from there, he helped outfit two forts in the south; Lower Fort Garry, and Fort du Bas de la Rivière at the mouth of the Winnipeg River.

From 1826 to 1832, his postings took him to various posts on the Pacific coast and subsequently to Fort Albany. He travelled aboard the Cadboro along the coast of British Columbia identifying Somenos, Quamichan and Penelakut village sites. From there, he founded Fort Concord to extend the company's trade into the Winisk River area. Next was Martin Falls where he worked for six years; and then transferred to Fort Albany as Chief Trader. His last posting was Norway House where he stayed until he retired to Montreal. During his stay, he outfitted a number of northern expeditions including those of John Rae. He was also arrested a free trader, Andrew Bannatyne in an attempt to protect the HBC monopoly in the area.

During his working life with the HBC, Barnston was a student of the natural history of the various areas and his specimens are in the Smithsonian Institution, the British Museum, and the Redpath Museum at McGill. He wrote regularly for the Canadian Naturalist and often for the Ibis as well.

He became a fellow of the Royal Society of Canada in 1882.

== See also ==
- James Barnston
- Barnston Island (British Columbia)
