= James Barnston =

- Born: July 3, 1831; Norway House, Rupert's Land
- Died: May 20, 1858 (aged 26); Montreal, Canada East
- Education: University of Edinburgh
- Occupations: physician, botanist, and professor
- Relatives: George Barnston, father

James Barnston (July 3, 1831 – May 20, 1858), a son of HBC fur trader George Barnston, was born at Norway House (Man.), and trained as a medical doctor at the University of Edinburgh. He obtained an M.D. presenting a thesis 'Observations on scarlatina'.

Barnston had a love of natural history from his father's influence and this was nurtured while studying medicine. He returned to Canada in 1853 and practiced medicine in Montreal where he also actively continued his botanical pursuits. He promoted the founding of a chair in natural history at McGill University and became the first professor of botany at that institution.

He became ill at the end of his first course of lectures and never recovered, dying in his 26th year.
