= List of fossiliferous stratigraphic units in Nova Scotia =

This is a list of fossiliferous stratigraphic units in Nova Scotia, Canada.

Group or Formation	Period	Notes
Abenaki Formation	Cretaceous, Jurassic	
Arbuckle Brook Formation	Cambrian	
Arisaig Group/Doctors Brook Formation	Silurian	
Beechhill Cove Formation	Silurian	
Brigus Formation	Cambrian	
Canso Formation	Carboniferous	
Champlain Clay Formation	Canada	
Chapel Island Formation	Cambrian	
Cumberland Formation	Carboniferous	
Cumberland Group/Joggins Formation	Carboniferous	
Cumberland Group/Port Hood Formation	Carboniferous	
Cuslett Formation	Cambrian	
Doctors Brook Formation	Silurian	
Fosters Point Formation	Cambrian	
French River Formation	Silurian	
Fundy Group/Blomidon Formation	Triassic	
Fundy Group/McCoy Brook Formation	Jurassic	
Fundy Group/Wolfville Formation	Triassic	
Horton Formation	Carboniferous	
Horton Group/Cheverie Formation	Carboniferous	
Horton Group/Horton Bluff Formation	Carboniferous	
Horton Group/Horton Bluff Formation	Carboniferous	
Knoydart Formation	Devonian	
Mabou Formation	Carboniferous	
Mabou Group/Parrsboro Formation	Carboniferous	
Morien Formation	Carboniferous	
Moydart Formation	Silurian	
Pictou Formation	Carboniferous	
Pictou Formation	Carboniferous	
Riversdale Formation	Carboniferous	
Riversdale Group/Joggins Formation	Carboniferous	
Ross Brook Formation	Silurian	
Ross Point Formation	Silurian	
Stellarton Formation	Carboniferous	
Stonehouse Formation	Silurian	
Windsor Formation	Carboniferous	
