= Random Formation =

Geologic formation In Canada

- Stratigraphic range: Early Cambrian
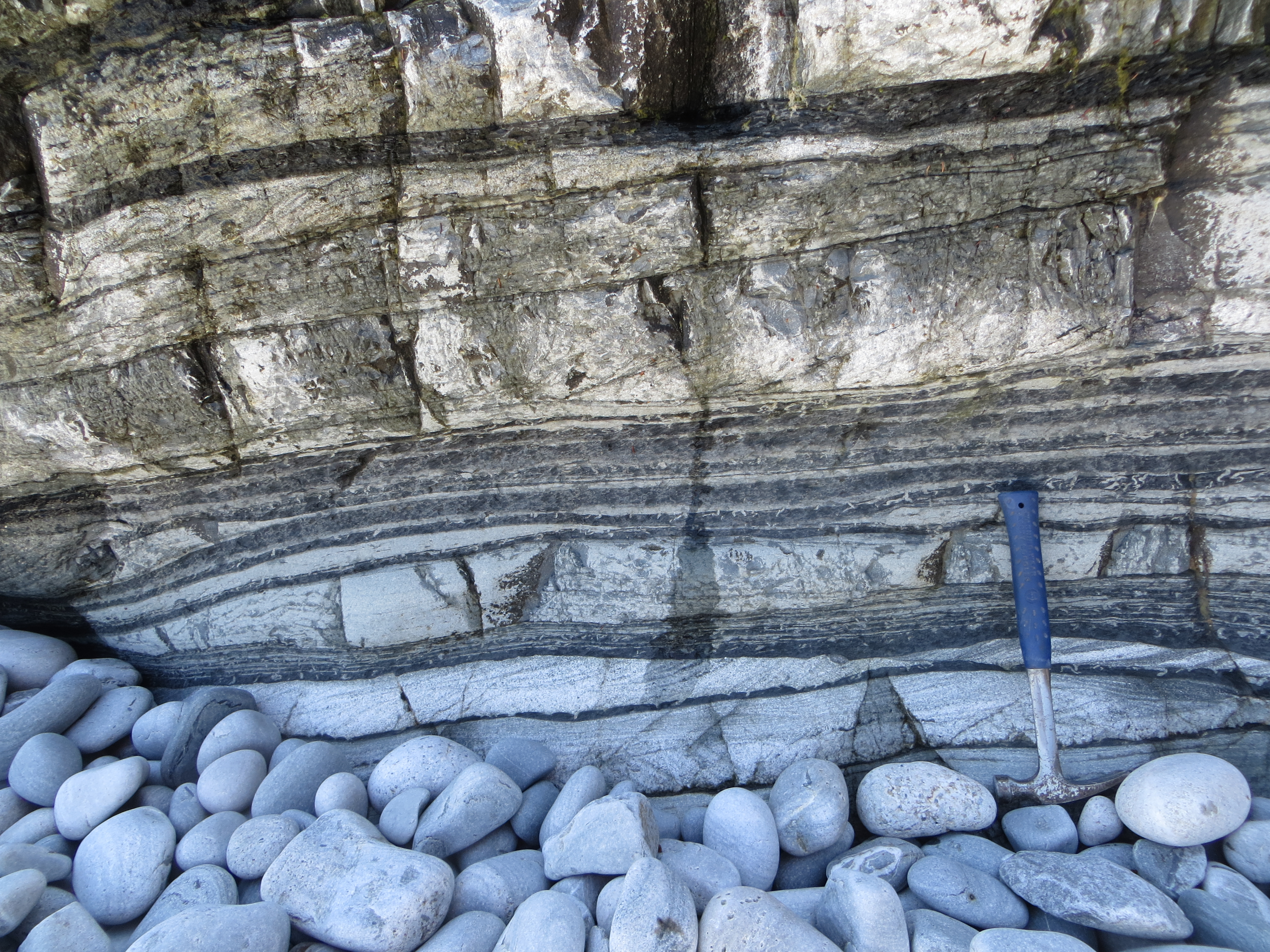
- Some facies of the Random Formation: Synaresis cracks in mudstones, with overlying white cross-bedded tidal sandstones
- Type: Formation
- Unit of: Young's Cove Group, Musgravetown Group, or none, depending on authority (and location)
- Underlies: (Unconformably) Bonavista Fm and others
- Overlies: Chapel Island Fm (conformably, Burin Peninsula); Crown Hill Formation (conformably, Random Island)
- Thickness: From a few metres to 250 m

Lithology
- Primary: Herringbone-crossstratified white arenites
- Other: Grey-green silts and shales

Location
- Region: Newfoundland
- Country: Canada

Type section
- Named for: Random Island
- Bedrock distribution of the Random Formation

The Random Formation is a rock unit in Newfoundland dating to the early Cambrian period, dominated by tidal quartz arenites deposited in a near-shore environment, but also incorporating intertidal and open-shelf deposits, including glauconitic and mud-cracked mudstones (now shales), and red channel sandstones. It was deposited quickly and is approximately 175 m (574 ft) thick. The Blue Pinion Formation was originally recognized as a separate formation, but is now interpreted as an expression of the Random Formation.

== Sedimentology ==
Its white arenitic sandstones are very distinctive, recognizable from their herringbone cross-stratification that denotes the influence of storm systems. Interbedded green-grey sands and silts represent an intertidal setting.

== Spatial distribution ==
It is widespread throughout Newfoundland unlike its underlying units. It was deposited in intertidal mud flats to subtidal setting, then (later) near the bottom of an open marine shelf.

The top of the unit intergrades with the overlying strata.

== Stratigraphy ==
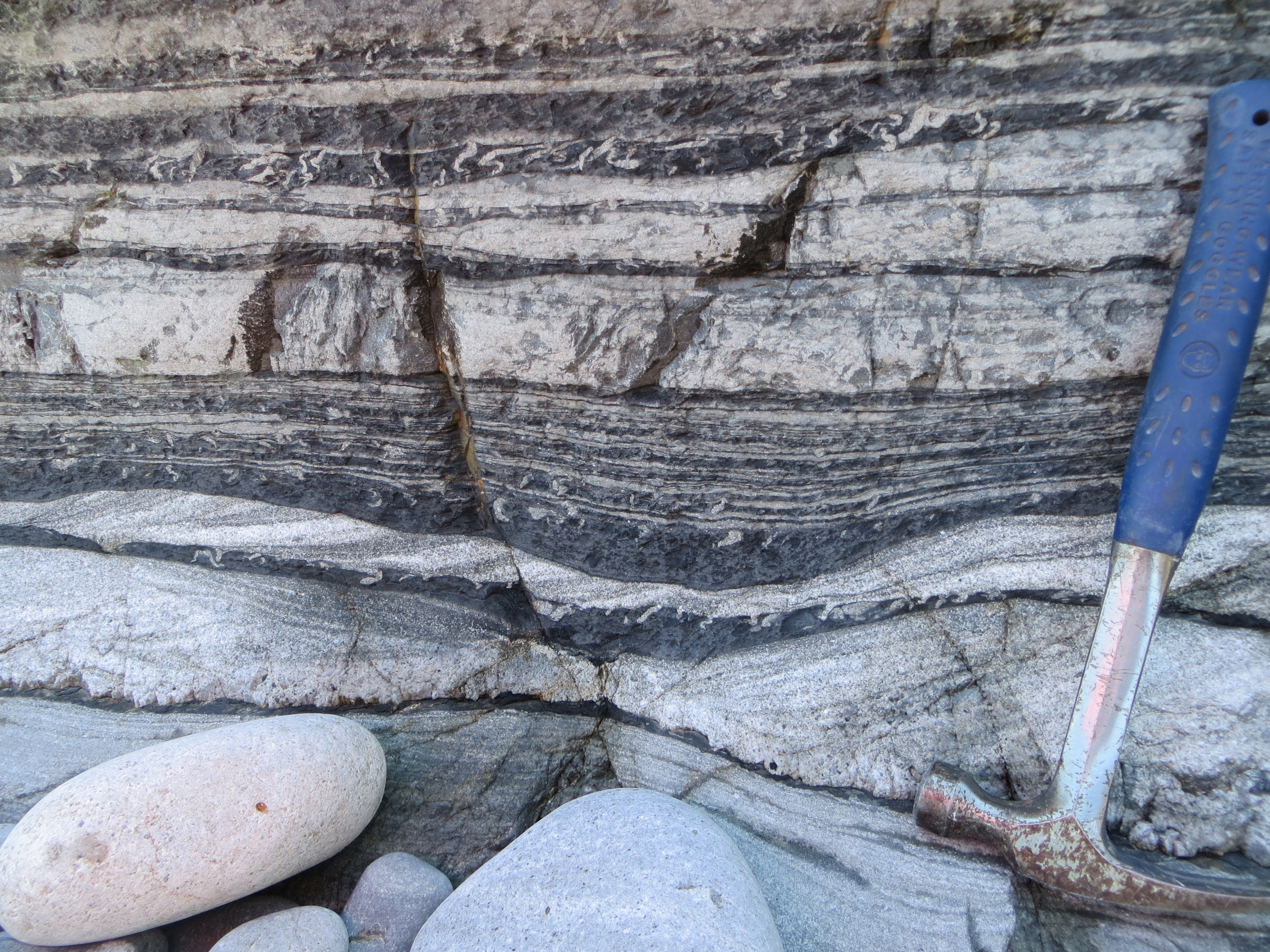
Synaresis cracks in the Random Formation, Trinity Bay, Newfoundland

Some studies assign the Random Formation as the lowest unit of the Adeyton Group, but strictly it is below that group.

It overlies the Chapel Island formation, which contains the Precambrian/Cambrian boundary.

The unit is often strongly folded.

== Age ==
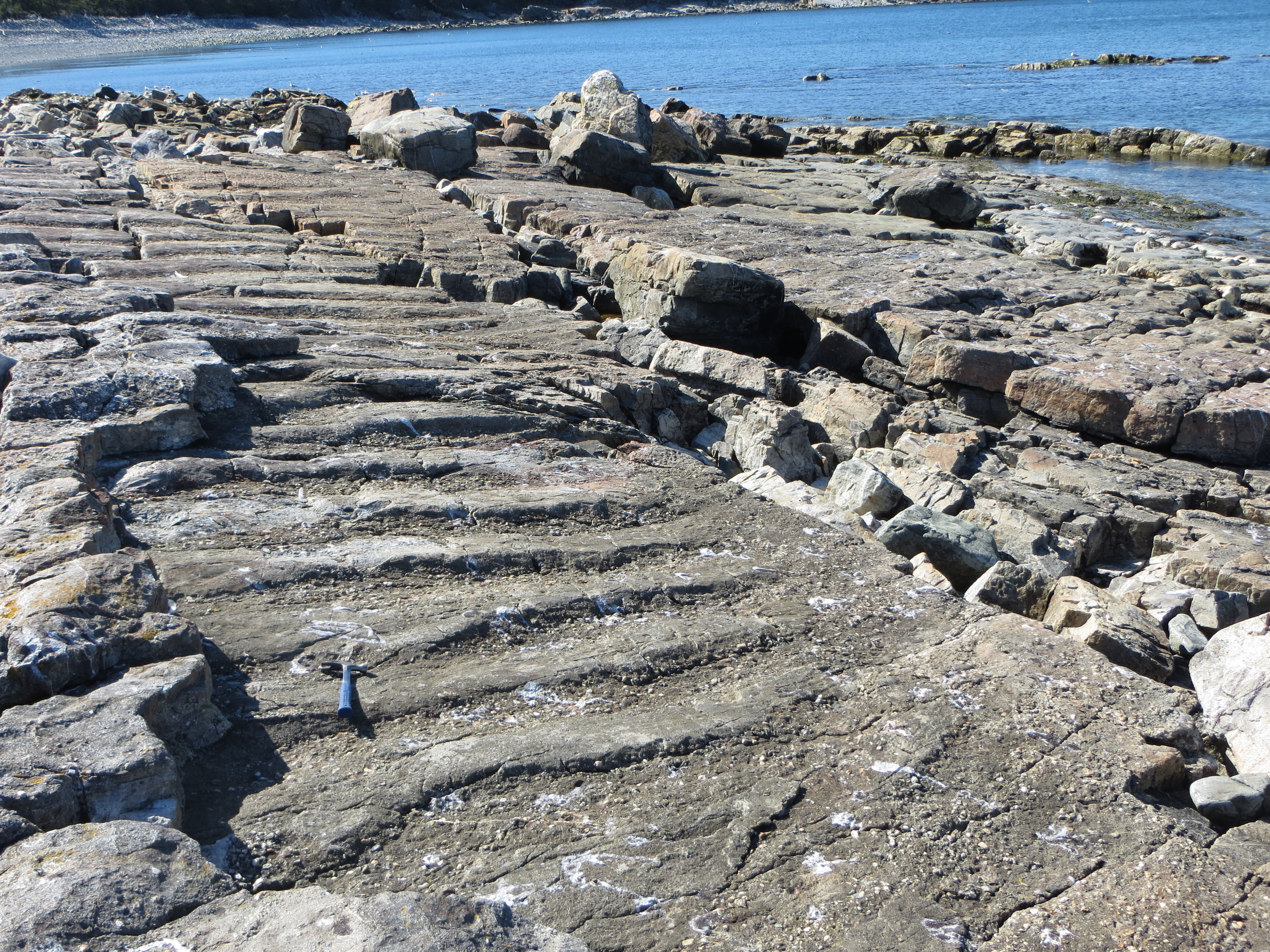
Megaripples in the quartz arenites of the Random Formation

The formation is difficult to date, but is considered Precambrian, as it lies unconformably under the Bonavista Formation and conformably above Ediacaran strata. It does sit above the Chapel Island Formation on the Burin peninsula meaning that, at that location, the lower boundary is in the Lower Cambrian. Inarticulate brachiopods have been found in its upper strata, dating these to the late early or even early mid Cambrian.

However, it is likely that the unit is diachronous and may date into the Ediacaran further to the east.

The Cambrian stage 2 - stage 3 boundary (Tommotian/Atdabanian) has been reported as being within the Random Formation, or possibly in the overlying Bonavista Formation. The overlying Smith Point Formation hosts the first trilobites.

== Palaeontology ==
The trilobite-like trace fossils Rusophycus and Cruziana occur in the Random Formation, alongside a range of other ichnofossils including Diplocraterion, Paleodictyon, Scolicia, and Squamodictyon. Body fossils include the small shelly fauna Aldanella attleborensis assemblage.

== See also ==
- Inlet Group
