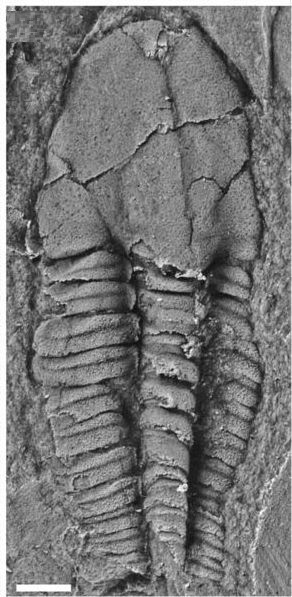
- Agraulos ceticephalus Menevia Formation, Wales

Scientific classification
- Kingdom: Animalia
- Phylum: Arthropoda
- Clade: †Artiopoda
- Class: †Trilobita
- Order: †Ptychopariida
- Family: †Agraulidae
- Genus: †Agraulos; Hawle & Corda, 1847

Species
- A. ceticephalus (Barrande, 1846); A. socialis (Billings, 1872); A. affinis (Billings, 1872); A. lewisi Fletcher, 2017

Synonyms
- Agraulos synonymy: Arion Barrande, 1846; non Arion Férussac, 1819; Arionides Barrande, 1847; Arionellus Barrande, 1850; Agrauloides Howell, 1937; A. ceticephalus synonymy: Arion ceticephalus; Arionides ceticephalus; Arionellus ceticephalus; Arionellus longicephalus

= Agraulos =

Agraulos Temporal range: Middle Cambrian ~510–499 Ma

Genus of trilobites

Agraulos is a genus of Solenopleuridae trilobites that lived during the Middle Cambrian in North America and Europe, particularly the Czech Republic. The genus was named by Hawle & Corda in 1847.

== Etymology ==
Agraulos is derived from the Greek Ἄγραυλος, "country woman", wife of Kekrops.

== Type species ==
Type species (designated by Miller 1889). Arion ceticephalus Barrande, 1846 from the Cambrian Eccaparadoxides pusillus Zone in the Skryje Member of the Buchava Formation, within the Skryje–Tyrovice Basin, Bohemia.

== Diagnosis ==
Agraulinae with cephala generally domed; glabella isosceles-trapezoidal, i.e. with truncate front and base angles of the forward-converging lateral margins/flanks more than 15°; occipital ring mesially swollen backwards, with or without a medial node or spine; preglabellar field relatively long (sag.); posterolateral projection of fixigena narrow (tr.); librigenal spines short to long, with some deflected outwards. Thorax of up to 16 segments with first anterior axial rings marked by terrace lines immediately succeeded in some species by rings bearing incipient median nodes or incipient/prominent spines; thoracic segments finely punctate or granulate. Pygidium, small and transverse (Fletcher, 2017, pp, 9,10).

== Distribution ==
- A. ceticephalus (= Arionellus longicephalus Hicks, 1872) occurs in the Middle Cambrian Jince Formation of the Czech Republic. The species was first described from the Skryje Member of the Buchava Formation (Chlupáč et al. 1998; Fatka et al. 2011) on the slopes of the Berounka River in the Týřovice-Luh-Skryje area between Prague and Plzeň in the Skryje-Týřovice Basin. The species has been recovered also from the Menevia Formation of St. David's, South Wales (Fletcher, 2017, Fig. 8, I, J, K and Fig. 9, A-C) and, as its junior subjective synonym "Agraulos longicephalus" (Hicks, 1872), from the Nant-y-big Formation (Hypagnostus parvifrons Biozone) of Porth Ceiriad, North Wales (Young et al., 2002; Young et al., 1994, p. 343), the Manuels river formation of Eastern Newfoundland (Martin and Dean, 1988, p. 21, pl.3, figs. 9, 11, 12; non figs. 10 & 13), and Spain (Sdzuy, 1961, pl.23, ?figs. 8–11, 15). Fletcher (2017, p. 26) observed that specimens described by Weidner and Nielsen (2015, pl. 41A–F; Fig. 22B) as Agraulos longicephalus (from the Middle Cambrian Paradoxides paradoxissimus Superzone of the Alum Shale Formation and within the lower and upper parts of the Ptychagnostus s.l. atavus Zone as well as in the Ptychagnostus punctuosus Zone), are in fact "marked by a conspicuous small median projection on the occipital ring, quite different from any species recorded elsewhere".
- A. socialis (Billings, 1872) occurs in the Manuels River Formation (Drumian Stage) of Eastern Newfoundland where localities include the eastern side of chapel arm in Trinity Bay, Deep Cove in St Mary's Bay, and the Manuels River Section near St John's (Fletcher, 2017, p. 25). Fletcher also observed (op. cit. pp. 25, 26) that "of all the specimens referred to longicephalus, the exoskeleton from the Montagne Noire figured by Courtessole (1973, pl. 10, fig. 5; Fig. 22P) appears to be very close to A. socialis, as are Sdzuy's 1961 illustrations of associated Spanish cranidia and a thoracic axis without notable nodes or spines".
- A. affinis (Billings, 1872) derives from the Big Gulley Member green mudstone of the Chamberlain's Brook Formation in the coastal cliffs of the greater Branch Cove on both sides of the Branch River estuary, St Mary's Bay, Newfoundland, originally as part of the Geological Survey of Newfoundland Collection (Fletcher, op. cit, p. 21). The species occurs in association with the Scandinavian taxa Condylopyge carinata Westergärd, 1936 and Parasolenopleura gregaria [Solenopleura cristata Linnarsson, 1877] indicating a zonal position about that of Ptychagnostus praecurrens (Fletcher, op.cit.) and Eccaparadoxides oelandicus.
- A. lewisi Fletcher, 2017 (p. 19, fig. 9D-I) is recorded from the Menevia Formation of Porth-y-rhaw, St. David's, Wales and derives from the Hypagnostus parvifrons Biozone (Localities PR-4 and PR-16 of Rees et al., 2014). The species is also recorded from the parvifrons Zone in the Harlech Dome of North Wales, Clogau Formation, above Rhaiadr Bridge (Fletcher, op. cit. Fig. 8, F & G).

== Remarks ==
Arionellus quadrangularis Whitfield (1884), originally collected from the mid-Cambrian Braintree Formation at Old Hayward Quarry, Quincy, Massachusetts, US, had previously been assigned to Agraulos by Walcott and others. McMenamin (2002), however, erected Skehanos to accommodate the species as Skehanos quadrangularis.

Scandinavian species attributed by Westergård (1953) to Agraulos [i.e. A. difformis, A. aculeatus, A. acuminatus (all Angelin, 1851), and A. anceps] were transferred by Ahlberg & Bergström (1978) to Proampyx although several Lower Cambrian forms they also assigned to Proampyx would later be allocated to various other genera.
