= Ives Head Formation =

Geologic formation in Leicestershire, United Kingdom

- Stratigraphic range: early Ediacaran; ~620–611 Ma
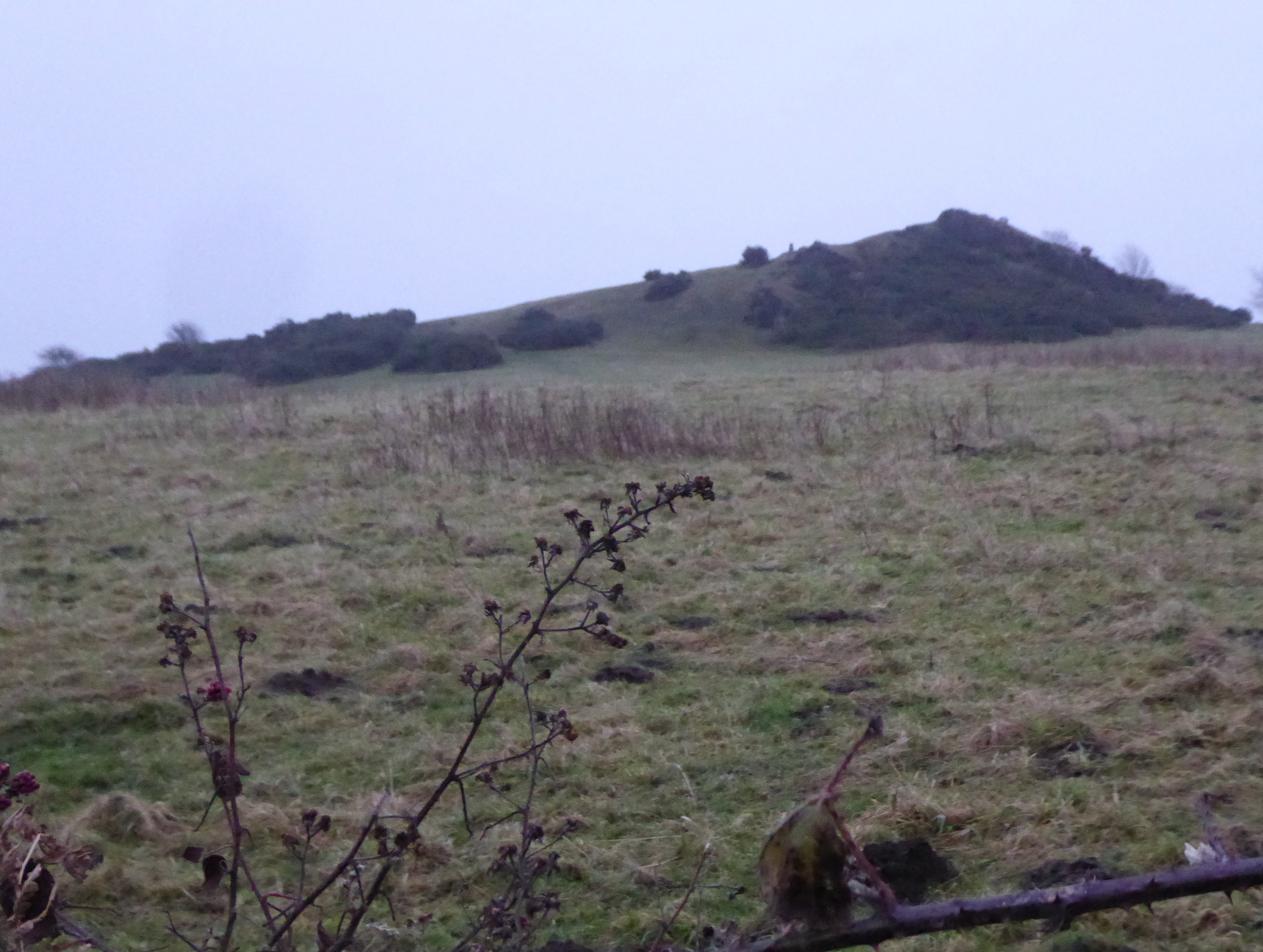
- Ives Head, the locality after which the formation is named.
- Type: Formation
- Unit of: Blackbrook Group
- Sub-units: Morley Lane Tuffs, Lubcloud Greywackes, South Quarry Slump Breccia Members
- Underlies: Blackbrook Reservoir Formation
- Overlies: Morley Lane Volcanic Formation (Not seen)
- Thickness: 820 m (2,690 ft)

Lithology
- Primary: Tuff
- Other: Breccia, Greywacke, Sandstone, Dacite

Location
- Region: Leicestershire
- Country: United Kingdom

Type section
- Named for: Ives Head

The Ives Head Formation is a geologic formation in Leicestershire, England. It forms part of the Blackbrook Group within the Charnwood Forest succession. The unit preserves rocks of Lower Ediacaran age and is named after the locality of Ives Head.

== Geology ==
The Ives Head Formation is the lowest formation within the Blackbrook Group, being overlain by the tuffaceous Blackbrook Reservoir Formation. The dominant rocks in this formation are also tuffaceous in nature. A borehole sample taken some 541 m (1,775 ft) below the formation itself, known as the "Morley Lane Borehole", showed that the formation is underlain by 294 m (965 ft) of greenish-gray tuffs, pelites and sandstone, which are inter-bedded in layers of porphyritic dacite lava-rock. This underlying rock would later be named the "Morley Lane Volcanic Formation".

=== Members ===
There can be found three members in this formation, which are as follows, in ascending stratigraphic order (lowest to highest):

- Morley Lane Tuffs Member: Coming in at 238 m (781 ft), this member is primarily composed of coarse-grained tuffs, with moderate amounts of finely laminated dust-tuffs and tuffaceous pelites.
- Lubcloud Greywackes Member: Coming in at 550 m (1,800 ft), this member is dominated by medium to very fine-grained greywackes, with some layers of greywackes being tuffaceous in nature. There can also be found throughout the member moderate amounts of coarse-grained greywackes and finely laminated tuffaceous pelites.
- South Quarry Slump Breccia Member: Only coming in at 32 m (105 ft), this member is predominately composed of slump volcanic breccia, as well as coarse-grained tuffs and finely laminated dust-tuffs.

== Dating ==
The Ives Head Formation has been dated using U–pd dating on several zircon samples collected from the base, middle, and top of the formation. Samples collected from the top and middle of the formation yielded a date range of 611+2
−4 Ma to 611±2 Ma, giving a maximum deposition age of 611 Ma. Samples from the base of the formation would yield a date range of 622 Ma to 620 Ma, with a minimum deposition age of 620 Ma used.

== Paleobiota ==
The Ives Head Formation contains the oldest known fossils within the Charnian Supergroup, occurring on the Lubcloud surface. Preliminary zircon ages suggest that these fossils may be older than the Gaskiers glaciation if the proposed dating is confirmed, with the base of the formation lying just below 611 Ma. This would place them among the oldest currently recognised Ediacaran assemblages; however, comparisons with units such as the 580 Ma Rocky Harbour Formation in Newfoundland and Labrador and the 602 Ma Lantian Formation in China remain tentative, as the dating of the Charnian succession requires further refinement.

Color key: Taxon / Reclassified taxon / Taxon falsely reported as present / Dubious taxon or junior synonym / Ichnotaxon / Ootaxon / Morphotaxon

Notes
Uncertain or tentative taxa are in small text
~~crossed out~~ taxa are discredited.

=== Ivesheadiomorph ===
Genus	Species	Locality	Notes	Images
Blackbrookia	B. oaksi	Lubcloud Greywackes Member	Poorly preserved organism, possibly of a petalonamid.	
Ivesheadia	I. lobata	Lubcloud Greywackes Member	Poorly preserved organism.	
Shepshedia	S. palmata	Lubcloud Greywackes Member	Poorly preserved organism.	

== See also ==
- List of fossiliferous stratigraphic units in the United Kingdom
