= Arionellus =

Arionellus Barrande, 1850, is a disused name for a genus of trilobite. The name Arionellus was a replacement for Arionides Barrande, 1847, itself a replacement for Arion Barrande, 1846, which was preoccupied because Férussac had already used it in 1819 for a genus of slugs.

Agraulos had already been proposed as replacement for Arion by Hawle and Corda in 1847, but Barrande unjustly considered it a homonym of Agraulis, a butterfly named by Boisduval in 1836.

The species of Arionellus have now been reassigned to the following genera.

- A. bipunctatus = Croixana bipunctata
- A. ceticephalus = Agraulos ceticephalus
- A. convexus = Camaraspis convexa
- A. cylindricus = Keithiella cylindrica
- A. oweni = Modocia oweni
- A. primaevus = Strenuaeva primaeva
- A. pustulatus = Glaphurus pustulatus
- A. texanus = Tricrepicephalus texanus
- A. tripunctatus = Tricrepicephalus tripunctatus
