= Fosters Point Formation =

Geologic formation in Canada

- Stratigraphic range: mid Cambrian
- Type: Formation
- Underlies: Brigus Formation
- Overlies: Bonavista Group

Lithology
- Primary: Limestone

Location
- Region: Nova Scotia, Newfoundland
- Country: Canada

The Fosters Point Formation is a Cambrian limestone geologic formation in Nova Scotia and Newfoundland. It preserves fossils.

== See also ==
- List of fossiliferous stratigraphic units in Nova Scotia
- List of fossiliferous stratigraphic units in Newfoundland and Labrador
