= Wild Cove formation =

- Stratigraphic range: 575 – 538.8 Ma (Ediacaran)
- Type: Formation
- Unit of: Musgravetown Group

Lithology
- Primary: Sedimentary

Location
- Region: Newfoundland
- Country: Canada
- Occurrence of the Wild Cove formation in southeastern Newfoundland

The Wild Cove formation is a formation cropping out in Newfoundland.
