= Trinny Cove Formation =

Geologic formation in Newfoundland, Canada

- Stratigraphic range: Ediacaran
- Type: Formation
- Unit of: Musgravetown Group
- Underlies: Crown Hill Formation
- Overlies: Maturin Ponds Formation

Lithology
- Primary: Olive green - Red Sandstone
- Other: Siltstone, Conglomerate, Grey Shale

Location
- Region: Newfoundland
- Country: Canada
- Occurrence of the Trinny Cove Formation in southeastern Newfoundland

The Trinny Cove Formation is an Ediacaran formation cropping out in Newfoundland. It is made up of various sandstones, siltstones and conglomerates, with some minor grey shales.
