= Deadmans Cove Formation =

Geologic formation in Newfoundland, Canada

- Stratigraphic range: Ediacaran
- Type: Formation
- Unit of: Musgravetown Group

Lithology
- Primary: Siliciclastic sandstone

Location
- Region: Newfoundland
- Country: Canada
- Occurrence of the Deadmans Cove Formation in southeastern Newfoundland

The Deadmans Cove Formation is a geologic formation cropping out in Newfoundland. This is the part of Musgravetown group.
