= Heart's Desire Formation =

Formation of sandstone in Newfoundland, Canada

- Stratigraphic range: Ediacaran
- Type: Formation
- Unit of: Musgravetown Group
- Underlies: Crown Hill Formation
- Overlies: Heart's Content Formation

Lithology
- Primary: Olive-green Sandstone

Location
- Region: Newfoundland
- Country: Canada
- Occurrence of the Heart's Desire Formation in southeastern Newfoundland

The Heart's Desire Formation is an Ediacaran formation of 'olive-green' sandstones cropping out in Newfoundland.
