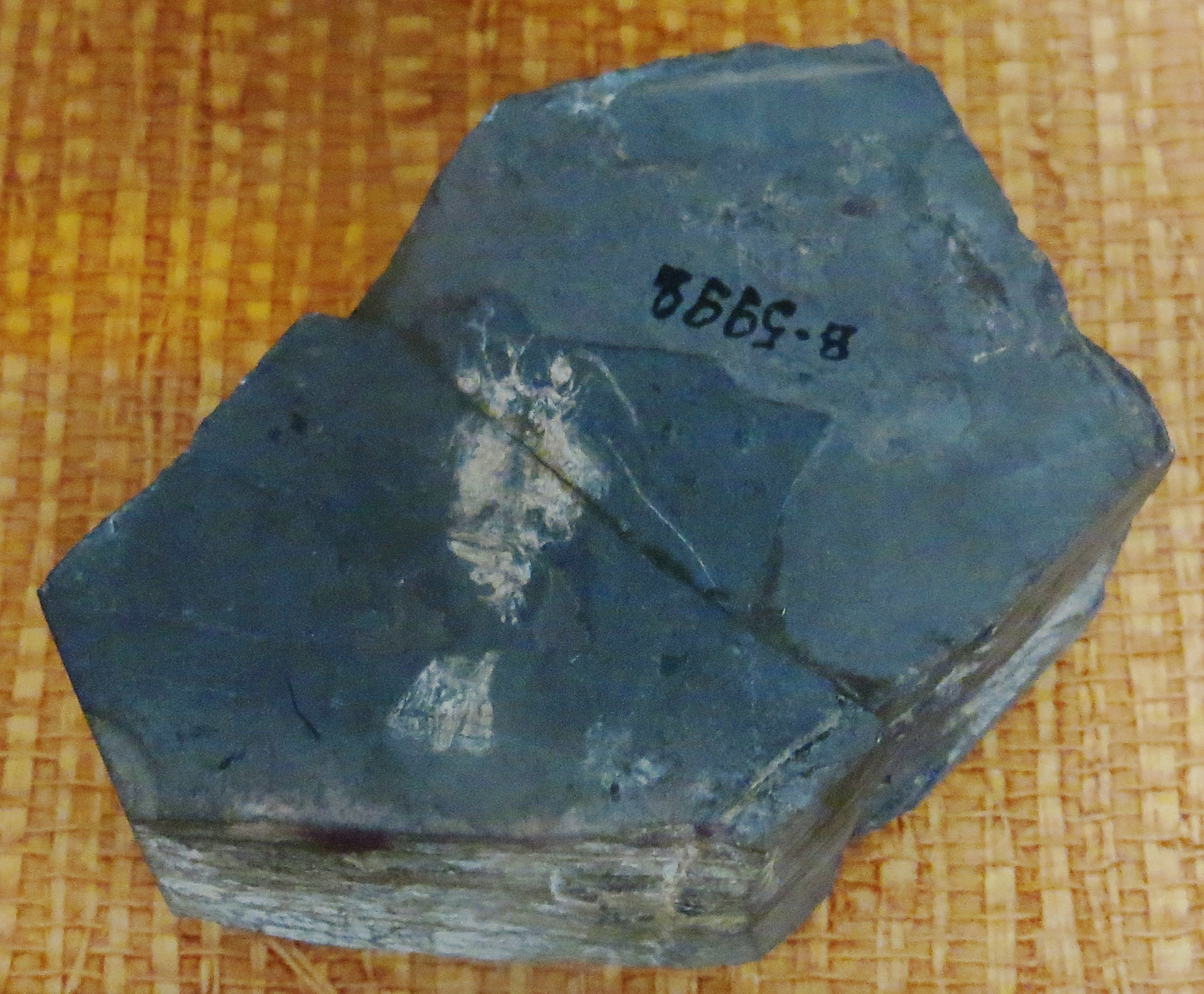
- Fossil of T. woodwardi at the Gallery of Paleontology and Comparative Anatomy
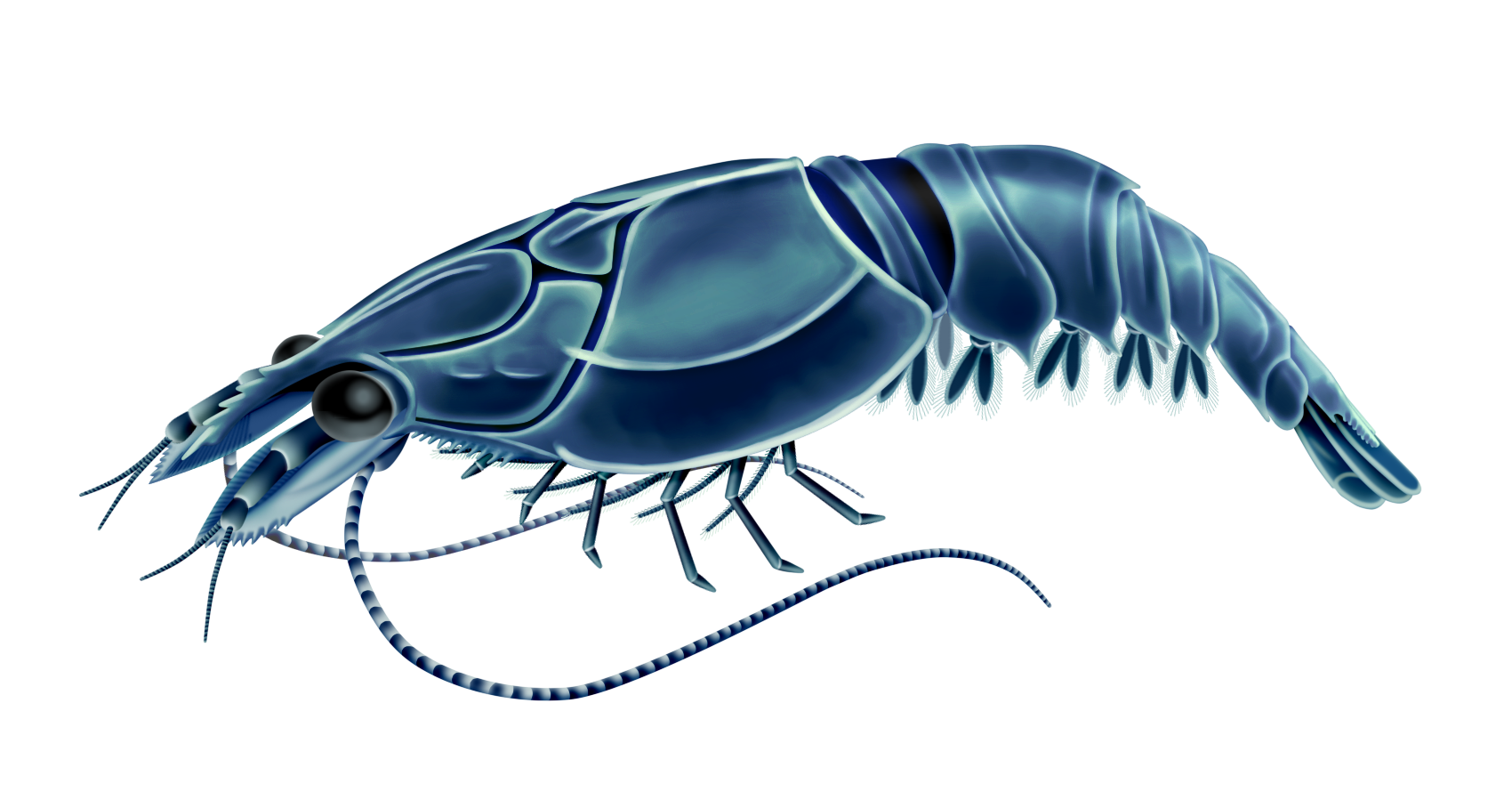
- Reconstruction of T. etheridgii

Scientific classification
- Kingdom: Animalia
- Phylum: Arthropoda
- Class: Malacostraca
- Order: †Pygocephalomorpha
- Family: †Tealliocarididae
- Genus: †Tealliocaris; Peach, 1908

Type species
- †Anthrapalaemon? woodwardi (= †Tealliocaris woodwardi) Etheridge, 1877

Other species
- †T. etheridgii Peach, 1882; †T. caudafimbriata Copeland, 1957; †T. palincsari Schram, 1988; †T. holthuisi Irham et al., 2010; †T. walloniensis Gueriau et al., 2014; †T. briggsi Clark and Ross, 2024; †T. weegie Clark and Ross, 2024

Synonyms
- Synonyms of Tealliocaris: Pseudotealliocaris Brooks, 1962; Synonyms of T. woodwardi: Anthrapalaemon? woodwardi Etheridge, 1877; Tealliocaris loudonensis Peach, 1908; Tealliocaris tarrasiana Peach, 1908; Synonyms of T. etheridgii: Anthrapalaemon etheridgii Peach, 1882; Anthrapalaemon etheridgii var. latus Peach, 1882; Anthrapalaemon formosus Peach, 1882; Tealliocaris etheridgei Peach, 1908; Tealliocaris etheridgei var. lata Peach, 1908; Tealliocaris formosa Peach, 1908; Pseudotealliocaris etheridgei Schram, 1979; Synonyms of T. caudafimbriata: Tealliocaris barathrota Copeland, 1957; Tealliocaris belli Copeland, 1957; Pseudotealliocaris caudafimbriata Brooks, 1962; Synonyms of T. palincsari: Pseudotealliocaris palincsari Schram, 1988; Synonyms of T. holthuisi: Pseudotealliocaris holthuisi Irham et al., 2010; Synonyms of T. weegie: Tealliocaris robusta var. Peach, 1908

= Tealliocaris =

Tealliocaris Temporal range: Famennian–Serpukhovian

Extinct genus of crustaceans

Tealliocaris is an extinct genus of pygocephalomorphans that lived from the Late Devonian to Early Carboniferous periods in Europe and North America. The genus was established in 1908 by Ben Peach, and many species have been assigned to it since, though some are now invalid or have been reassigned to other genera. Although it can be inferred that T. loudonensis was originally intended as the type species of Tealliocaris, this species is now deemed a junior synonym of T. woodwardi, first described as a species of Anthrapalaemon in 1877, and thus T. woodwardi is currently deemed the type species of the genus.

== Discovery and naming ==
=== Earliest finds ===
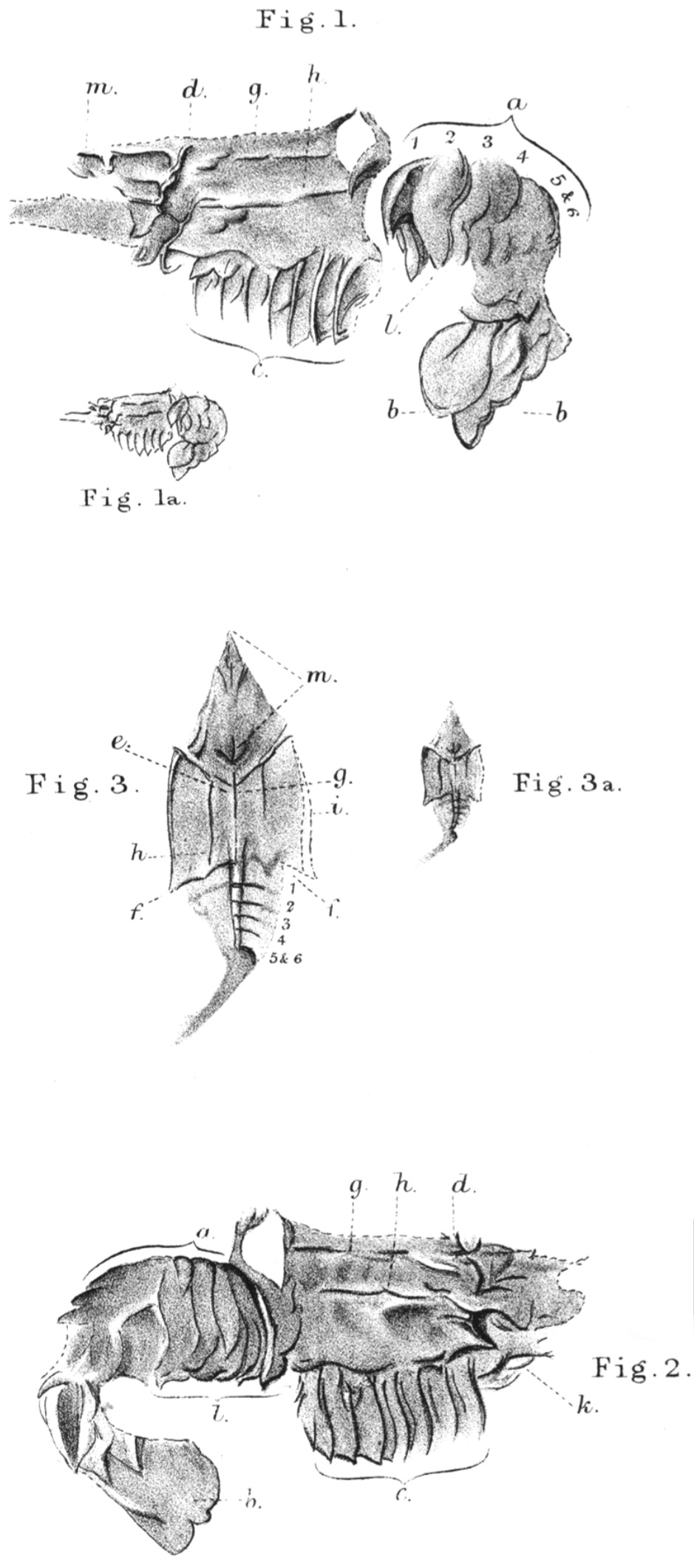
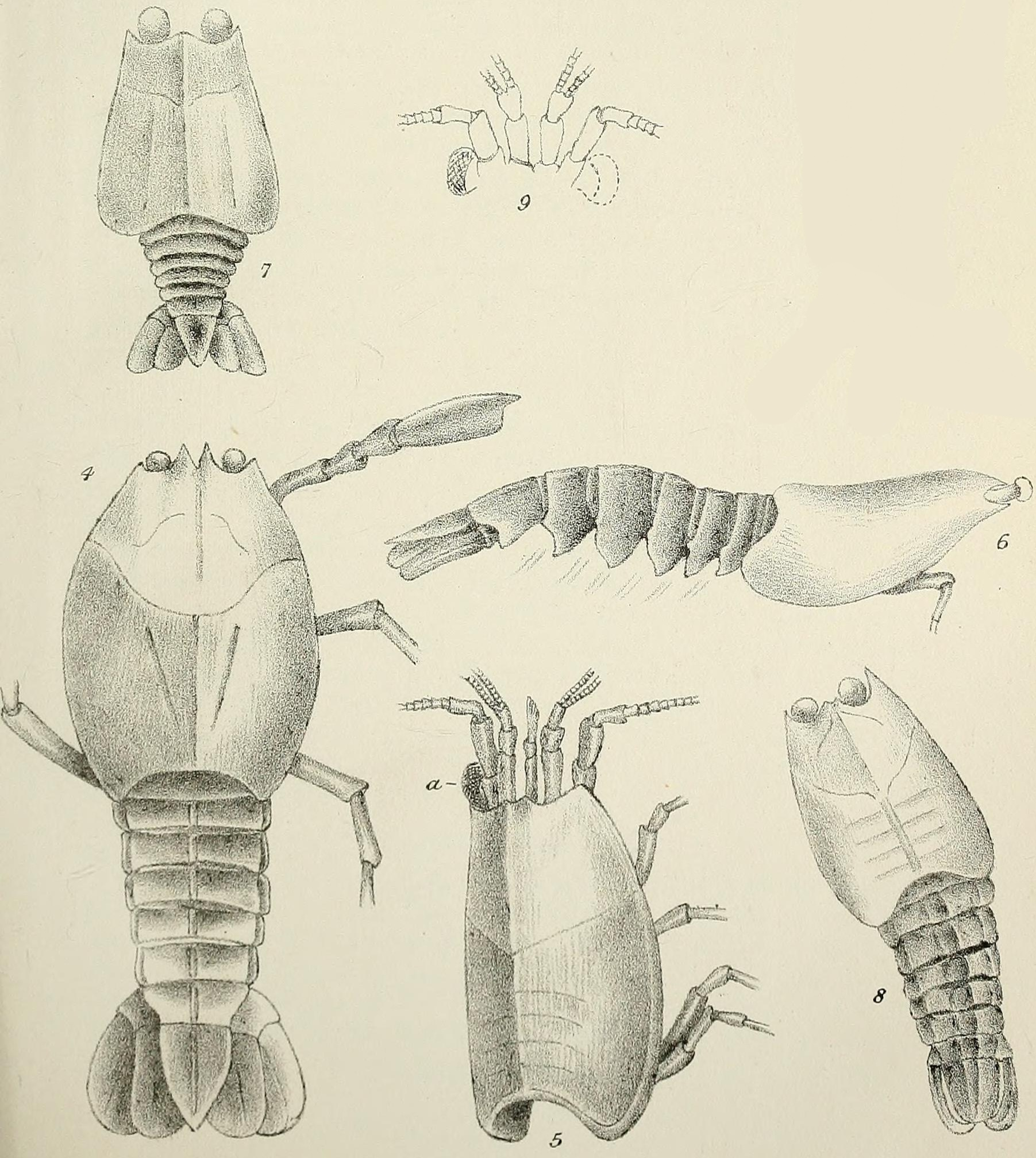
Figures drawn by Etheridge in 1877 (left) and 1879 (right) of T. woodwardi fossils, originally labelled as Anthrapalaemon woodwardi

Species of Tealliocaris have been described before the genus was established, originally being placed into the genus Anthrapalaemon. In 1877, British paleontologist Robert Etheridge, Junior became the first to study fossils of Tealliocaris, analysing an iron nodule containing remains of two individuals discovered by James Connie (a collector of the Geological Survey of Scotland) in Carboniferous-aged deposits at Belhaven Bay, near Dunbar, Scotland. Believing they were similar to remains of Anthrapalaemon, he tentatively assigned this specimen as a new species of the genus which he named Anthrapalaemon? woodwardi after English paleontologist Henry Woodward. Later in 1879, Etheridge redescribed the species after studying more specimens of it found by A. Macconochie in three other southern Scottish sites, and confidently designated it as a species of Anthrapalaemon.

Two other species were first described as members of Anthrapalaemon in 1882 by British paleontologist Ben Peach under the names A. etheridgii and A. formosa respectively, with the additional erection of a subspecies of the former named A. etheridgii var. latus, and are based on a series of specimens found in Glencartholm, Scotland. It was not until 1908 that Peach realized A. woodwardi and species similar to it belong in a separate genus, which he named Tealliocaris. The generic name combines the surname of Jethro Teall (the Director of the Geological Survey of Scotland at the time and Peach's former Chief) with the Ancient Greek word καρίς (karís, meaning "shrimp"), with the suffix being added to distinguish this genus from Tealia (a genus of sea anemone currently deemed invalid). He reclassified the three A. woodwardi, A. etheridgii and A. formosa as species of Tealliocaris, and A. etheridgii var. latus as a subspecies within the same genus, with the subspecific name being changed to lata (thus renaming the subspecies as T. e. var. lata). The specific name of A. etheridgii was also misspelled as etheridgei, which would lead to this misspelling being used in later studies such as Schram (1979). In addition, Peach erects three new species which he named T. loudonensis, T. tarrasiana and T. robusta respectively, and two new subspecies designated as T. woodwardi var. and T. robusta var., all of which are based on material collected in Scotland. In the section describing T. woodwardi, it can be inferred that Peach intended for T. loudonensis to be the type species of the genus.

=== Later revisions ===
In 1979, American paleontologist Frederick Schram discovered that the specimens assigned to T. woodwardi do not differ significantly from those assigned to T. loudonensis, with the former including smaller specimens but also broadly overlapping in size range with the latter. In addition, the remains placed within T. tarrasiana were found to be poorly preserved specimens that also show no objective difference when compared to T. woodwardi and T. loudonensis. These three species were thus deemed synonymous, with T. woodwardi becoming the only valid species among them and the other two becoming junior synonyms of it based on the principle of priority. Furthermore, Schram found T. etheridgii (referred to as T. etheridgei due to Peach's misspelling), T. formosa and T. robusta to all be synonymous with each other, believing their fossils represent only one species. He also believed this species should be placed in the genus Pseudotealliocaris (see below), and thus gave this species the name P. etheridgei. These revisions left T. woodwardi as the only species within Tealliocaris, becoming the type species since T. loudonensis (the original type species) became a junior synonym of it, and the specimen GSE 5950 was designated as the lectotype. Briggs and Clarkson (1985) supported this synonymy, but used the fossil described in 1877 by Etheridge as the holotype rather than the lectotype chosen by Schram.

In 2013, a paper by Neil D.L. Clark redescribing Tealliocaris was published in which it was determined that T. robusta is a distinct species from T. etheridgii, and thus was reinstated as a valid name. The subspecies T. robusta var. was determined to be invalid, as being more slender (the characteristic originally used by Peach to distinguish it) was deemed an undiagnostic trait for distinguishing between species of Tealliocaris, and thus the supposed subspecies could not be distinguished from other T. robusta specimens. The synonymy between T. woodwardi and T. loudonensis continued to be accepted, so the former remained the type species of the genus. However, Clark later found in a 2024 study with Andrew J. Ross that T. robusta should be moved into the genus Schramocaris, renaming it as S. robusta, and that the specimens designated by Peach as T. robusta var. represent a separate species within the genus Tealliocaris. Therefore, T. robusta var. was renamed as T. weegie, naming it after the people of Greater Glasgow in the local dialect. Clark and Ross also recognized another new species from Scottish specimens, one of which (GSE 13042) was originally assigned to T. tarrasiana by Ben Peach in 1908 under the specimen number m2049c. However, because the T. tarrasiana holotype was already synonymized with T. woodwardi, this new species was instead named T. briggsi.

=== Pseudotealliocaris ===
A study on the Carboniferous arthropods of The Maritimes by M.J. Copeland was published in 1957 in which three new species were described and assigned to Tealliocaris. The first was named T. caudafimbriata, the specific name meaning "tail fringe", with Copeland assigning two specimens to this species. Several specimens were assigned to the species named T. barathrota, deriving the specific name from a Greek word meaning "pitted", in reference to the pits and wrinkles across the carapace of the animal. The species T. belli was established based on a single fossil (GSC 10138) and named after Canadian geologist Walter A. Bell. All specimens assigned by Copeland to these three species were collected from the Mabou Group (then known as the Canso Group) in Nova Scotia, Canada.

In 1962, Harold Kelly Brooks analysed the figures from Copeland's 1957 study of the three Canadian species assigned to Tealliocaris and determined that Copeland had misinterpreted the fossils, though Brooks was unable to access the actual specimens for study. Brooks found that there no significant differences were discernable between the three supposed species, and that the Canadian specimens represent only one species. Furthermore, he states that this species differs from other known Tealliocaris in having long anterolateral (orbital) spines and large branchiolateral keels on the carapace. Based on this, Brooks establishes the genus Pseudotealliocaris, renaming Tealliocaris caudafimbriata as Pseudotealliocaris caudafimbriata and designating it as the type species of the genus, while T. barathrota and T. belli were declared as junior synonyms of this species. Later authors would add more species to this genus; Frederick Schram moved Tealliocaris etheridgii into this genus as P. etheridgei in 1979, later established the species P. palincsari in 1988, and P. holthuisi was named in 2010 by Mohammed Irham and colleagues.

A redescription of Tealliocaris by Neil D.L. Clark published in 2013 found that the features used by Brooks in 1962 to distinguish the genus from Pseudotealliocaris are actually present on Scottish specimens of Tealliocaris, including the type species T. woodwardi. Therefore, it was announced that Pseudotealliocaris is a junior synonym of Tealliocaris. Though the Canadian specimens were noted to be poorly preserved, Clark decided to retained the name Tealliocaris caudafimbriata for them until specimens preserving more distinct diagnostic features (like spines on the scales of the antennae) are found. The species P. palincsari and P. holthuisi were also moved into Tealliocaris, though Clark does mention that their material should be reanalysed to confirm if such a placement is accurate.

=== Valid species ===
Many species have been assigned to Tealliocaris in the years since the genus was established, though some have since been reassigned to other genera or declared invalid. The following species are currently deemed valid:

- T. woodwardi was first tentatively assigned as a species of Anthrapalaemon in 1877 and moved into Tealliocaris when the genus was named in 1908. It has been the type species of Tealliocaris ever since T. loudonensis was declared a junior synonym of it by Frederick Schram in 1979. The type specimen (BGS 5944) was collected from Belhaven Bay near Dunbar, and many more fossils of this species have been found across Scotland, including 198 specimens from Cheese Bay, East Lothian, five from the Granton Shrimp Bed, one from below the Glencartholm shrimp beds. Additional specimens from Newfoundland, Canada were initially reported in 1982 as T. sp. aff. loudonensis, but should be referred to T. woodwardi as the two species are now considered synonymous.
- T. etheridgii was initially named in 1882 by Ben Peach as a species of Anthrapalaemon. The lectotype is BGS 5918, as designated by Frederick Schram in 1979. Known specimens have been collected from the Scottish sites of Glencartholm and Muirhouse.
- T. caudafimbriata was named by M.J. Copeland in 1957 and is known from several specimens found in the Mabou Group of Nova Scotia, Canada. The type specimen is GSC 10382. The known remains are poorly preserved and almost indistinguishable from specimens of Scottish Tealliocaris species, but the spines on the edge of the carapace are longer, suggesting they do represent a distinct species. Clark (2013) therefore decided to retain the name T. caudafimbriata until more complete specimens are discovered.
- T. palincsari was first described in 1988 by Frederick Schram under the name Pseudotealliocaris palincsari. It is known from several fossils extracted from a borehole drilled in Warsaw Township, Pennsylvania by the Pennsylvania Department of Natural Resources. The specific name honors Edward Palincsar, Schram's former professor at Loyola University Chicago. Though the specimens were initially reported to originate from the Mississippian-aged Pocono Formation, the deposits they were found in are now considered to be within the Famennian-aged part of the Huntley Mountain Formation instead.
- T. holthuisi was first described as a species of Pseudotealliocaris in 2010 by Mohammed Irham and colleagues. The holotype is a fossil and its counterpart collective designated SDSNH 123200, and several additional specimens are designated as paratypes. These were all collected by J.R. Jennings from the Mississippian-aged Leitchfield Formation along Helm Creek near Leitchfield, Kentucky. The species is named after Dutch carcinologist Lipke Holthuis.
- T. walloniensis was named in 2014 afted the Wallonia region of Belgium, where the known fossils were found. The holotype (IRSNB a 12866a–b) and paratypes originate from the late Famennian-aged Bois des Mouches Formation in Strud, with additional specimens being known from Trooz and Anhée. This species is known from continental deposits, and would have lived in freshwater habitats.
- T. briggsi was named by Neil D.L. Clark and Andrew J. Ross in 2024 on the basis of several specimens, including the holotype (NMS G.2015.32.912), three paratypes (including GSE 13042, a specimen initially assigned to T. tarrasiana, now deemed a junior synonym of T. woodwardi) and 16 other specimens. The type specimen was found in the Tournaisian-aged lower part of the 'plant bed' of the Ballagan Formation, at Willie's Hole in Chirnside, Scotland. The species is named after Irish paleontologist Derek Briggs, who found fossils at this location and worked alongside Ross in 1993.
- T. weegie was first described as a subspecies and designated T. robusta var. by Ben Peach in 1909. In 2024, it was redescribed as a separate species within Tealliocaris and given the name T. weegie, named after the people of Greater Glasgow in the local dialect. The holotype (UCZM I.9430) was found in Pendleian (regional substage corresponding to the early Serpukhovian)-aged shales above the Top Hosie Shale at Bearsden, Scotland, and specimens have also been found at other Scottish sites such as Peel Burn, Red Cleugh Burn, Hindog Glen and East Kilbride.
