= Grebes Nest Point Formation =

- Stratigraphic range: Early Ordovician– Middle Ordovician
- Type: Formation
- Unit of: Wabana Group

Lithology
- Primary: Marine sediments

Location
- Region: Newfoundland
- Country: Canada
- Occurrence of the Grebes Nest Point Formation in southeastern Newfoundland

The Grebes Nest Point Formation is a formation cropping out in Newfoundland.
