= Salmonier Cove Formation =

- Stratigraphic range: Late Cambrian
- Type: Formation
- Unit of: Young's Cove Group

Lithology
- Primary: Marine siliciclastic shale

Location
- Region: Newfoundland
- Country: Canada
- Occurrence of the Salmonier Cove Formation in southeastern Newfoundland

The Salmonier Cove Formation is a formation cropping out in Newfoundland.
