= Little Bell Island Formation =

Island formation in Newfoundland and Labrador

- Stratigraphic range: Late Cambrian– Early Ordovician
- Type: Formation
- Unit of: Bell Island Group

Lithology
- Primary: Marine sediments

Location
- Region: Newfoundland
- Country: Canada
- Occurrence of the Little Bell Island Formation in southeastern Newfoundland

The Little Bell Island Formation is a formation cropping out in Bell Island, Newfoundland.

== Landslide of 2009 ==
On May 7, 2009, a landslide occurred on the Little Bell Island Formation. This landslide occurred in part because of heavy rains caused by a passing spring cold wave. Because of the remoteness of the outcropping, only sea animals and intertidal life was affected at first. But because of the large amount of debris pushed into the Atlantic Ocean, a small tidal wave formed and crashed into the main Newfoundland Island, affecting beachgoers and fishing vessels.
