= Blackbrook Group =

Geologic group in Leicestershire, the United Kingdom

- Stratigraphic range: Ediacaran 620–569 Ma
- Type: Group
- Unit of: Charnian Supergroup
- Sub-units: Blackbrook Reservoir Formation; Ives Head Formation; South Quarry Slump Breccia Member; Lubcloud Greywackes Member; Morley Lane Tuffs Member
- Underlies: Maplewell Group
- Thickness: 1,430+ m (4,691+ ft)

Lithology
- Primary: Tuff
- Other: Pelite, Greywacke, Breccia, Sandstone, Dacite

Location
- Region: Leicestershire
- Country: United Kingdom

The Blackbrook Group is a geologic group in Leicestershire, and is the oldest group of the Charnian Supergroup. It preserves fossils dating back to the Ediacaran period. It mainly contains pelite, tuff and greywacke.

== Formation units ==
It is made up of two formations, and is the basal-most unit of the Charnian Supergroup. Uppermost formation within the group is the Blackbrook Reservoir Formation, tuffeceous pelite, tuffs and coarse-grained tuffs. This is underlain by the basal-most formation of the group and supergroup, the Ives Head Formation, which consists of slump breccia, coarse-grained tuffs and dust tuffs, with fine-grained and tuffeceous greywackes in the middle part of the formation, and nearer to its base are sandstones and dacite lavas.

== Dating ==
Whilst no proper full zircon dating has been performed in the Blackbrook Group, some dating has returned a lower age of 620 Ma, with the top age of 569 Ma based on the base of the overlying Maplewell Group. As the group contains some of the oldest fossils of the Charnian Supergroup, found in the Lubcloud surface of the lower-most Ives Head Formation, it has been noted that if these dates can be confirmed and backed by more samples, then they could be the oldest pre-Gaskiers biota known, and even the oldest Ediacaran biota, beating out the 580 Ma Rocky Harbour Formation of Newfoundland, and even the 602 Ma Lantian Formation of China, which would greatly change our understanding of the origins of the wider Ediacaran biota.

== See also ==
- List of fossiliferous stratigraphic units in the United Kingdom
