= Harcourt Group =

Geologic group in Canada

- Stratigraphic range: Middle Cambrian–Early Ordovician
- Occurrence of the Harcourt Group in southeastern Newfoundland
- Type: Group
- Sub-units: Clarenville Formation; Elliott's Cove Formation; Manuels River Formation
- Underlies: Bell Island Group (temporally - water cover obscures contact)
- Overlies: Adeyton Group

Location
- Region: Newfoundland
- Country: Canada

The Harcourt Group is a stratigraphic group of siliciclastic rocks deposited in the Gondwanan Margin, cropping out in the Avalon Zone of Newfoundland.
