= Knoydart, Nova Scotia =

Community in Nova Scotia, Canada

Knoydart
- Knoydart in Nova Scotia
- Coordinates: 45°43′05″N 62°13′59″W
- Country: Canada
- Province: Nova Scotia
- Municipality: Pictou County

Government
  - MLA: Tim Houston (PC)
  - MP: Sean Fraser (L)
- Time zone: UTC-4 (AST)
  - Summer (DST): UTC-3 (ADT)
- Postal Code: B0K 1G0
- Area codes: 902, 782

Knoydart is a rural coastal community located in the Canadian province of Nova Scotia along Nova_Scotia_Route_245. Unlike most communities in Nova Scotia, Knoydart is located in both the Municipalities of the County of Antigonish and in the County of Pictou. The picturesque community made up of small farms, rural homes and coastal cottages, offers a breathtaking panoramic view of the Northumberland Strait.

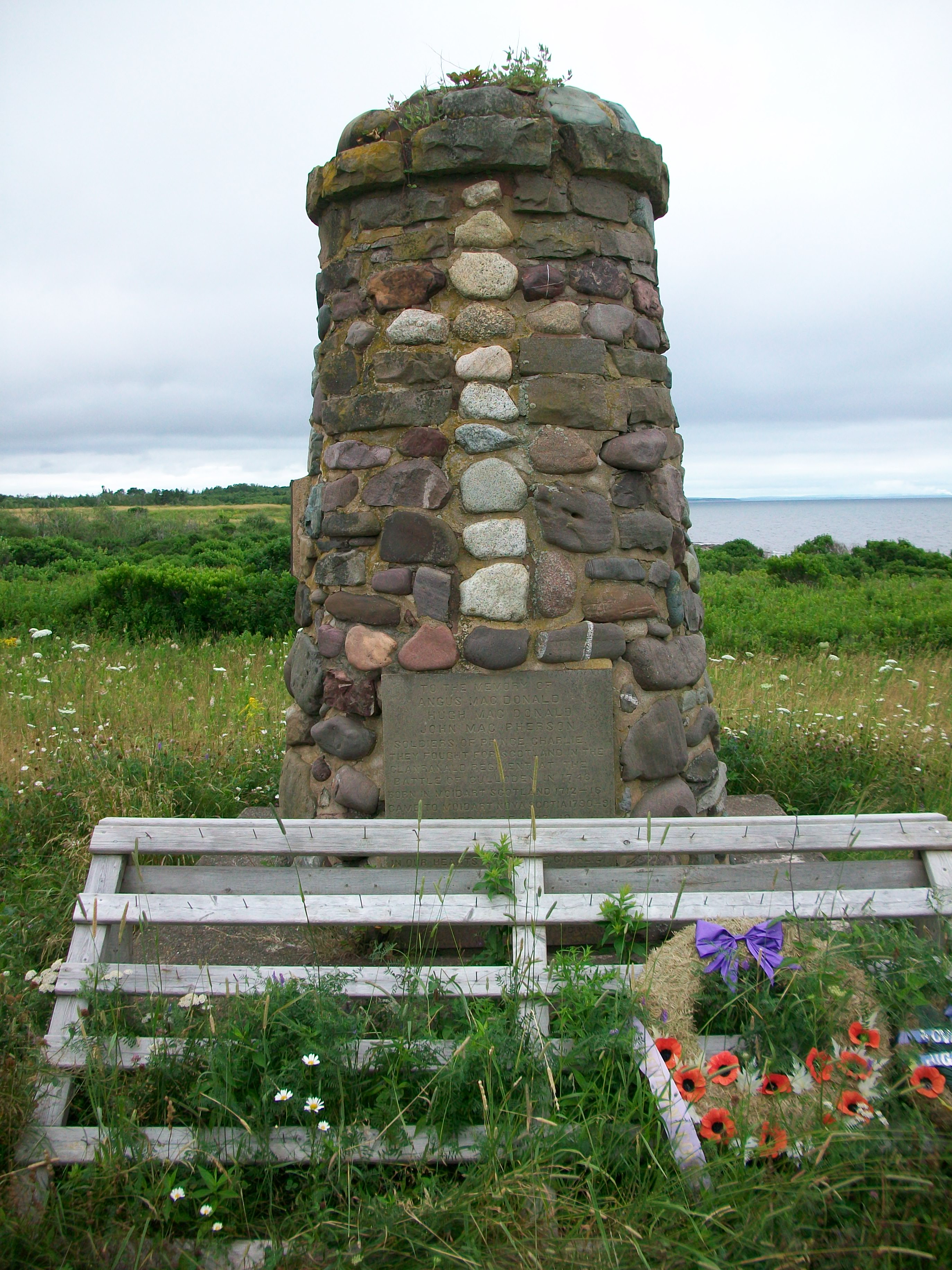
Culloden Cairn, Knoydart, Nova Scotia

== Geography ==
The community is classified as an unincorporated place in the Canadian Geographical Names Database (CGNDB). It is bounded by the community of Lismore to the west, the community of McAras Brook to the east, and the community of Ardness to the south. It has one main freshwater tributary, Knoydart Brook that flows north through the community before emptying into the Northumberland Strait. A small headland, known as Knoydart Point extends outwards into the strait as well close to where the brook meets the ocean.

== History ==
The community was named after Knoydart (Scottish Gaelic: Cnòideart) in Scotland by Martin McDonald, who was the first to settle here in 1787.

== Battle of Culloden Memorial ==
The community is most notable for the Culloden Memorial Cairn, commemorating three men who fought on the side of Bonnie Prince Charlie at the Battle of Culloden and emigrated to the area in the 1780s.

The Cairn was erected in 1938 and commemorates Angus MacDonald, Hugh MacDonald and John MacPherson – who are buried near the historic monument. The three men fought for the Jacobite cause in the Clan Ranald Regiment. The stone is a replica of the Cairn on the battlefield in Scotland and contains stones from the battlefield.

A plaque was installed on the cairn in 1978 and each year since 1982, a Battle of Culloden remembrance ceremony has been held to commemorate the day of the battle which is attended by over 300 people.

== Geology ==
The Knoydart_Formation is a Lower Devonian geological unit in Nova Scotia composed primarily of red siltstone, shale, and sandstone, preserves early-stage land-plant fragments, fish remains (such as ostracoderm scales), and freshwater or low-energy trace fossils.
