= Wabana =

Wabana may refer to:

- Wabana, Newfoundland and Labrador, Canada
- Wabana Township, Itasca County, Minnesota, United States
- Wabana Group, a geological group cropping out on Bell Island, Newfoundland, Canada

== See also ==
- Wabanaki Confederacy, a North American First Nations and Native American confederation
  - Abenaki, an Indigenous people of the Northeastern Woodlands of Canada and the United States
