= List of fossiliferous stratigraphic units in Massachusetts =

This article contains a list of fossil-bearing stratigraphic units in the state of Massachusetts, U.S.

== Sites ==
Group or Formation	Period	Notes
Agawam Group/Portland Formation	Jurassic	
Agawam Group/Turners Falls Formation	Jurassic	
Chamberlain's Brook Formation	Cambrian	
Meriden Group/East Berlin Formation	Jurassic	
Mount Toby Formation	Jurassic	
Portland Formation	Jurassic	
Weymouth Formation	Cambrian	

== See also ==
- Paleontology in Massachusetts
