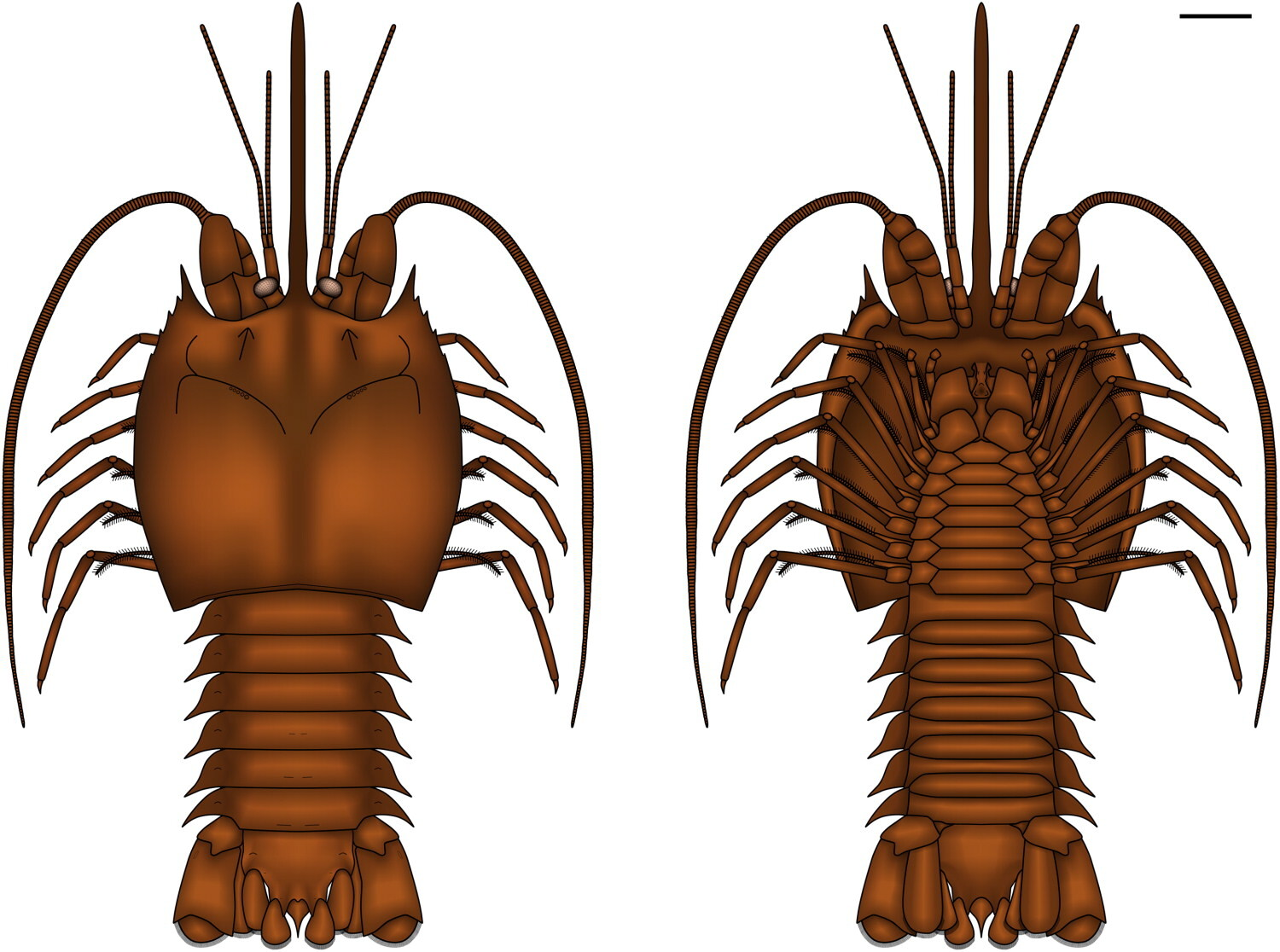
- Life restoration of Pygocephalus brymboensis
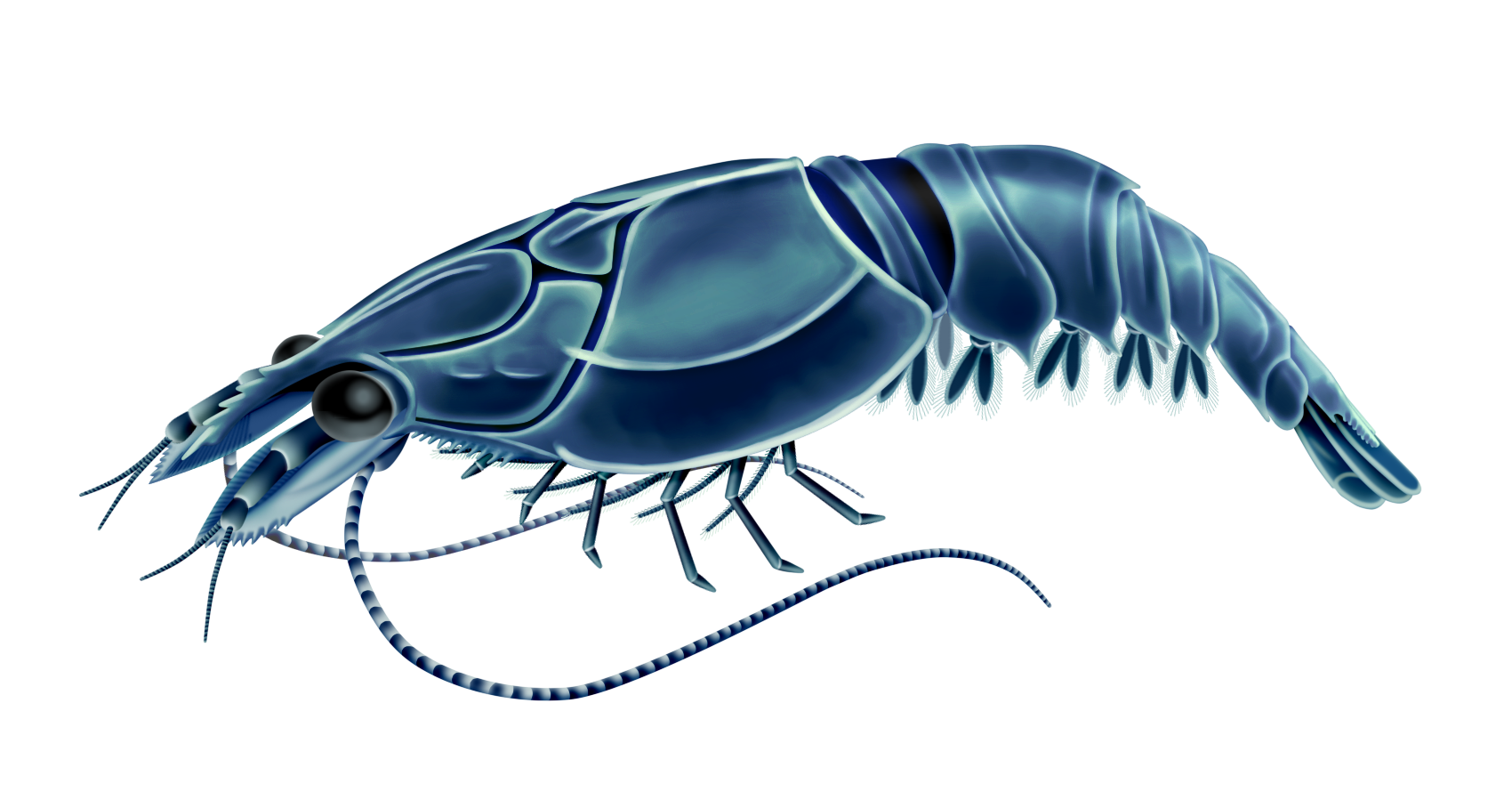
- Life restoration of Tealliocaris etheridgii

Scientific classification
- Kingdom: Animalia
- Phylum: Arthropoda
- Clade: Pancrustacea
- Class: Malacostraca
- Superorder: Peracarida
- Order: †Pygocephalomorpha; Beurlen, 1930

Families
- Jerometichenoriidae; Notocarididae; Pygocephalidae; Tealliocarididae; Tylocarididae

= Pygocephalomorpha =

Pygocephalomorpha Temporal range: Famennian–Early Permian

Extinct order of crustaceans

The order Pygocephalomorpha is an extinct group of peracarid crustaceans. Pygocephalomorpha appeared in the Late Devonian, were abundant from the Carboniferous period until their extinction in the Early Permian epoch.

This group constituted part of the freshwater and aquatic crustacean assemblages. The carapace is relatively axially shortened, with a prominent gastric region. Laterally, a cervical groove is visible, with carapace margins which is defined by an acute spine or process, including somewhat well developed branchiostegites".

== Taxonomy ==
The order contains extinct five families, and seven genera incertae sedis:

- †Jerometichenoriidae Schram, 1978
  - †Jerometichenoria Schram, 1978
- †Notocarididae Brooks, 1962
  - †Notocaris Broom, 1931
  - †Paulocaris Clarke, 1920
- †Pygocephalidae Brooks, 1962
  - †Anthracaris Brooks, 1962
  - †Mamayocaris Brooks, 1962
  - †Pygocephalus Huxley, 1857
- †?Tealliocarididae Brooks, 1962 (Affinity as pygocephalomorph is uncertain)
  - †Tealliocaris Peach, 1908
  - †Laevitealliocaris Yang et al., 2018
- †Tylocarididae Taylor, Yan-Bin & Schram, 1998
  - †Chaocaris Shen, 1983
  - †Fujianocaris Taylor, Yan-Bin & Schram, 1998
  - †Liocaris Beurlen, 1931
  - †Pseudogalathea Peach, 1883
  - †Tylocaris Taylor, Yan-Bin & Schram, 1998
- †Pygocephalomorpha incertae sedis
  - †Bellocaris Fong, 1972
  - †Hoplita Pineiro, Morosi & Ramos, 2012
  - †Iraticaris Adami-Rodrigues, Pazinato & Pinto, 2016
  - †Permocaris Adami-Rodrigues, Pazinato & Pinto, 2016
  - †Pittinucaris Adami-Rodrigues, Pazinato & Pinto, 2016
  - †Pygaspis Beurlen, 1934
  - †Sosiocaris Jones, 2015

== Phylogeny ==
The phylogeny of Pygocephalomorpha after Astrop 2026.

- †Pygocephalomorpha
  - †Liocaris sp.
  - - †Anthracaris gracilis
    - - - †Jerometichenoria grandis
        - - - †Mamayocaris jepseni
            - †Mamayocaris serendipitous
          - Pygocephalus
            - †Pygocephalus cooperi
            - - †Pygocephalus aisenvergi
              - - †Pygocephalus brymboensis
                - †Pygocephalus dubius
      - - †Paulocaris pachecoi
        - - †Pseudogalathea macconochiei
          - - - †Tylocaris asiaticus
              - †Fujianocaris bifurcatus
            - - †Schramocaris gilljonesorum
              - †Tealliocaris
                - †Tealliocaris woodwardi
                - - †Tealliocaris robusta
                  - †Tealliocaris etheridgii

== See also ==
- Tealliocaris
