= Mooring Cove Formation =

- Stratigraphic range: 555 – 549 Ma
- Type: Formation
- Unit of: Long Harbour Group
- Underlies: Rencontre Formation

Lithology
- Primary: Non-marine felsic volcanics

Location
- Region: Newfoundland
- Country: Canada
- Occurrence of the Mooring Cove Formation in southeastern Newfoundland

The Mooring Cove Formation is a formation of volcanic rock exposed in outcrops in Newfoundland.
