= Weymouth Formation =

Cambrian geologic formation found in eastern Massachusetts

- Stratigraphic range: Lower Cambrian; 517–512 Ma
- Type: Geological formation
- Underlies: Braintree Argillite
- Overlies: North Attleboro Formation
- Area: Avalon terrane within northeast Massachusetts

Lithology
- Primary: red, purple, and greenish gray mudstone
- Other: limestone, slate, phyllite

Location
- Region: Boston, Massachusetts, metropolitan area
- Country: United States of America

Type section
- Named for: Weymouth, Massachusetts
- Named by: LaForge (1932)

The Weymouth Formation is a geological formation in northeastern Massachusetts in the northeastern United States. The formation consists mainly of red, green, and purple mudstones and red limestones. It preserves an important record of the trilobites, hyoliths, and small shelly fossils, which occupied the Avalon terrane during the Lower Cambrian. Locally, metamorphism has transformed the mudstones of the Weymouth Formation into either slate or phyllite.

== History of Study ==
Fossils in the strata belonging to the Weymouth Formation were first noticed in outcrops along the shore of East Point near Nahant, Massachusetts by Louis Agassiz in 1850. However, he misidentified these fossils as fossil corals. Their true identity and age were determined by Foerste in 1889.

On the basis of lithology, Foerste in 1889, recognized the red slates and limestones exposed northeast of Mill Cove in North Weymouth as a distinct stratigraphic unit. Based on lithologic and local geologic structure, he concluded they were the same strata, although metamorphosed, exposed at East Point. Based upon fossil hyoliths found by Agassiz at East Point and stratigraphic correlations, Foerste assigned these strata to the Lower Cambrian. He also recognized them as being older than the Middle Cambrian Paradoxides-bearing slates exposed in the region of Braintree, Massachusetts.

Also in 1900, Crosby described and mapped unfossiliferous slates exposed along the shoreline of Mill Cove as part of his Blue Hills Complex. He assigned these slates to the Lower Cambrian based on their lithologic characteristics and local structural geology.

Back in 1899, Burr found fossil trilobites and hyoliths in outcrops east of Mill Cove. These fossils were reported by Burr in 1900. These fossils confirmed the Lower Cambrian age of these strata and demonstrated they are a different sequence of strata than the than the Middle Cambrian Paradoxides-bearing slates found in Braintree, Massachusetts region. Additional fossil trilobite and hyoliths reported Grabau further supported a Lower Cambrian age for the strata.

In 1909, LaForge informally proposed the name Weymouth formation for Lower Cambrian siliceous slate, limestone, and slaty quartzite that outcrops along the shoreline of Mill Cove and fossiliferous slaty mudstone that outcrops in and around Weymouth, Massachusetts. Later in 1932, LaForge formally named the same strata the Weymouth Formation with its type locality being the exposures of Lower Cambrian strata around Mill Cove in Weymouth. He included the 33 m (108 ft) feet of gray slaty quartzite and cherty greenish slate, with some thin beds of white limestone exposed at East Point near Nahant in Weymouth Formation.

In 1917, Emerson formally named a correlative sequence of reddish shale or slate with layers and noduIes of white limestone and the overlying greenish shale or slate the Hoppin Slate. Unlike the Weymouth Formation, Emerson included a basal white quartzite in the Hoppin Slate. The Hoppin Slate was named for Hoppin Hill in North Attleboro, Massachusetts, where the not greatly altered Hoppin Slate contains fossils of Lower Cambrian trilobites and hyoliths. As defined by Emerson, the Hoppin Slate is exposed at two places in Narragansett Basin, one at Hoppin Hill and the other in Wrentham, Massachusetts.

In 1944, Howell and others illustrate the Weymouth and Hoppin formations together in the same box in their correlation chart of Cambrian stratigraphic units. This indicates that they consider both formations to be age equivalent. Other studies accept the Weymouth and Hoppin formations as equally valid stratigraphic units.

In 1979, Anstey conducted a detailed study of the Hoppin Slate as defined by Emerson in 1917. He mapped its distribution within the Narragansett Basin and analyzed its sedimentology and paleontology. At the type locality, he recognized from bottom to top an 11 to 15 m (36 to 49 ft) thick basal quartzite; an 18 to 30 m (59 to 98 ft) thick green slate; a 34 to 44 m (112 to 144 ft) m thick fossiliferous red limestone; and an 186 m (610 ft) m thick red and green slate. He agreed with Dowse that the Hoppin Hill nonconformably overlies the underlying Dedham Granodiorite, formerly the Hoppin Granite, (598 ± 54 m.y.). He found that the limestones present in the Hoppin Hill exposures are lithologically similar to Lower Cambrian limestones exposed east and south of Mill Cove of the Fore River at Weymouth. However, he was unable to evaluate the stratigraphic relationships between the Hoppin Hill Slates and Weymouth Formation because the limestones and other strata of the Weymouth Formation were too poorly exposed.

After detailed geologic mapping analysis of the structural geology of the Boston and Milton, Massachusetts, region, Billings concluded in 1982 that the Weymouth Formation and other Cambrian strata in the region occur as roof pendants and large xenoliths in granite plutons. He proposed that these plutons are part of a deeply eroded and tilted Ordovician caldera. Finally, he recognized and mapped a regional, unnamed quartzite member at the base of the Weymouth Formation.

In 1988, Landing published an extensive analysis and review of the stratigraphy and paleontology. He concluded that the Hoppin Slate and Pirate Cave Formation are only local names for the same Lower Cambrian strata known as the Weymouth Formation. He proposed that the names Hoppin Slate, Hoppin Formation, and Pirate Cave Formation be abandoned and their use discontinued. In addition, he proposed that the Weymouth Formation be restricted to the Lower Cambrian red, purple, and green mudstones, limestones, and coeval phyllites and slates of eastern Massachusetts. Finally, he recognized the basal quartzite member of the Hoppin Slate and Weymouth Formation as a distinct, regionally extensive, stratigraphic unit, which he called the North Attleboro Formation. The North Attleboro Formation nonconformably overlies Neoproterozoic crystalline rocks.

The Weymouth Formation is correlated with, in ascending order, the Cuslett, Foster’s Point, and Brigus Formations in Newfoundland. The underlying the North Attleboro Formation is correlated it to the Random Formation in Newfoundland.

== Description ==
Because of the variable degrees of metamorphism, the lithology of the Weymouth Formation varies significantly although its protolith remains recognizably consistent throughout the Avalon Terrane in eastern Massachusetts and adjacent part of Rhode island. Where least effected by metamorphism, four different facies can be recognized. They are (1) purple, green, and grey, weakly bioturbated mudstone (shale) with or without calcareous nodules; (2) purple to red burrowed mudstone (shale) with or without calcareous nodules; (3) interbedded, red bioturbated shale and red nodular to bedded fossil wackestones to packstones with local algal mud mounds and oncolite--intraclast beds; and (4) algal mud mounds, laminated algal limestones, and fossil hash beds. Locally, the mudstones of the Weymouth Formation have been transformed into either slate or phyllite by metamorphism.

=== Northeastern Massachusetts ===
Southeast of Boston in the city of Weymouth, the Weymouth Formation consists largely of isolated and scattered exposures of greenish and purple, slate or slaty mudstones interbedded white (weathered) lime mudstones and conoidal fossil hash wackestones. At some of these exposures, the slaty purple and green mudstones contain deeply weathered calcareous nodules. As previously mentioned, unfossiliferous red slates and limestones of the Weymouth Formation occur as discontinuous exposures along the shoreline of Mill Cove.

At Hoppin Hill region in eastern Massachusetts, the Weymouth Formation consists of poorly exposed sections of fossiliferous red slate (slaty mudstone), red and green slate (slaty mudstone), and intraclast- and hyolith-rich red limestone. Isolated outcrops of the Weymouth Formation occur along Ellis Road and southwest of Sheldonville, Massachusetts. The latter outcrop consists of steeply dipping, maroon slates intercalated with algal mud mounds and shell hash that forms the northeast side of a roche moutonee.

At East Point, the easternmost extremity of Nahant, Massachusetts, spectacular sea cliffs expose a continuous 130 m (430 ft) of section of Weymouth Formation. Despite the outstanding quality of exposure, what should be a simple section is greatly complicated by fault offsets and interruptions by thick igneous sills and dikes. The section consists of a dark silicified mudstone or argillite interbedded with nodular horizons and limestone beds. A 3 m (9.8 ft) thick limestone bed occurs the southeast side of the point along the top of the cliff. At East Point, abundant dikes and sills of the Ordovician (?) Nahant Gabbro and faults disrupt the Weymouth Formation. In addition, the Weymouth formation has been substantially altered by contact metamorphism into hornfels in which the siliciclastic mudstones and have been transformed along with much of the nodular and bedded limestones into fine-grained epidote.

=== Southeastern Rhode Island ===
Highly folded and sheared, red and maroon phyllites and a basal limestone bed are exposed along the west-central coast of western Newport Neck in Newport, Rhode Island. Formerly known as the Pirate Cave Formation, these strata are now assigned to the Weymouth Formation, unconformable overlie late Precambrian arkosic turbidites. Insoluble residues of the basal limestone contains small shelly fossils.

== Contacts ==
The nature of the lower contact of the Weymouth Formation varies greatly with location. At Hoppin Hill, its steeply dipping to overturned strata uncomfortably overlies the 11 to 15 m (36 to 49 ft)thick white quartzites of the North Attleboro Formation. In turn, the stratigraphic base of the North Attleboro Formation nonconformably overlies a granodiorite that forms the bulk of Hoppin Hill. Among the evidence for a nonconformably is the presence of rounded pebbles of siliceous quartz arenite in thin sandstones of the Weymouth Formation. The lower contact of the Weymouth Formation has not been described in the Boston Basin, although Billings has mapped the presence of a layer of white quartzite, presumably the North Attleboro Formation, underlying the Weymouth Formation in that region. In addition, the presence of the North Attleboro Formation lying underneath the Weymouth Formation exposed at East Point is indicated by the occurrence of quartz arenite xenoliths in the Nahant Gabbro.

In the Hoppin Hill region, fanglomerates comprising the Pondville Conglomerate (Carboniferous) unconformably overlie and truncate the Weymouth Formation on the west side of Hoppin Hill Reservoir. In the Boston Basin, the upper contact of the Weymouth Formation is not exposed. Presumably, in that region, the Weymouth Formation is overlain by Middle Cambrian strata of the Braintree Argillite. At East point, the upper contact and strata younger than the Weymouth Formation are not preserved. Along the west-central coast of western Newport Neck, the Weymouth Formation is separated from Late Precambrian turbidites by an angular unconformity. At Newport Neck, the Weymouth Formation is overlain by Middle Cambrian phyllites.

== Paleobiota ==
From oldest to youngest, three faunas have been found in the Weymouth Formation: (1) a pre-trilobite Aldanella attleborensis assemblage, (2) a younger pre-trilobite small shelly fossils, Camenella baltic assemblage, and (3) a trilobite-bearing, Callavia assemblage. The trilobites found in the Callavia assemblage include Calodiscus lobatus, Dipharus attleborensis, Serrodiscus bellimarginatus, and Strenuella strenua. The Callavia (Elliptocephala) assemblage also contains, hyoliths and hyolithids, helcionellids, halkierids, brachiopods, tommotiids ((Rhombocorniculum), rostroconchs (Watsanella), and snails (Aldanella).

== Regional distributaion ==
These strata are interpreted to be the base of a latest Ediacaran–Ordovician transgressive - overstep sequence that once covered greatest Avalonia. This siliciclastic-dominated, marine sedimentary sequence once unconformably blanketed a Neoproterozoic pre-Avalonian basement composed of a crustal collage of arc, continental, oceanic fragments and mélanges. The marine sedimentary blanket and underlying Avalonian basement has since been broken up and distributed across the region of Rhode Island, Northeastern Massachusetts, Maritime Canada, and North Wales.

== See also ==
- List of fossiliferous stratigraphic units in Massachusetts
- Paleontology in Massachusetts
