= Maturin Ponds Formation =

Geologic formation in Newfoundland, Canada

- Stratigraphic range: Ediacaran
- Type: Formation
- Unit of: Musgravetown Group
- Underlies: Rocky Harbour Formation, Trinny Cove Formation and Heart's Content Formation
- Overlies: Big Head Formation

Lithology
- Primary: Red Sandstone
- Other: Mudstone, Conglomerate

Location
- Region: Newfoundland
- Country: Canada
- Occurrence of the Maturin Ponds Formation in southeastern Newfoundland

The Maturin Ponds Formation is an Ediacaran formation cropping out in Newfoundland, comprising red sandstones and minor conglomerates.
