= Bonavista Formation =

Geologic formation in Newfoundland and Labrador, Canada

- Stratigraphic range: Early Cambrian
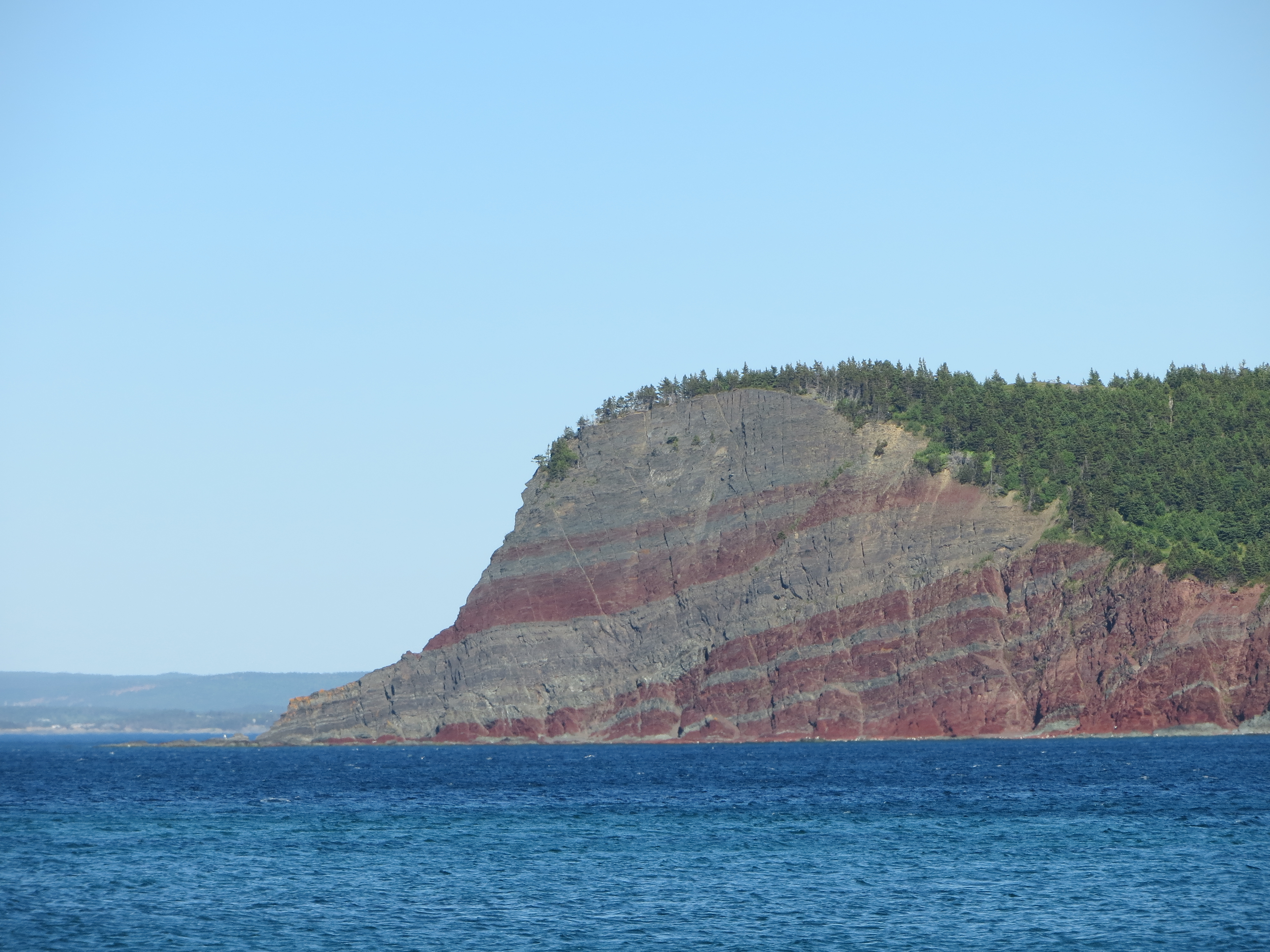
- Bonavista Fm near Long Cove, Trinity Bay, NL
- Type: Formation
- Unit of: Adeyton Group
- Underlies: Smith Point Fm
- Overlies: Random Fm

Location
- Region: Newfoundland
- Country: Canada
- Occurrence in southeast Newfoundland

The Bonavista Formation is an Early Cambrian formation which is exposed in outcrop in Newfoundland. The unit is dominated by red mudstone, with some purple-green mudstones, and the occasional interbedded nodular limestone. A gritty conglomerate is exposed at the base of the unit.
