= Brigus Formation =

Geologic formation in Canada

- Stratigraphic range: Stage 4 (Latest Lower Cambrian)
- Type: Formation
- Unit of: Adeyton Group
- Underlies: Chamberlain's Brook Formation
- Overlies: Smith Point Fm, Fosters Point Formation

Location
- Region: Newfoundland and Labrador
- Country: Canada

The Brigus Formation is a fossiliferous (e.g. trilobites) upper lower Cambrian geologic formation in Newfoundland and Labrador.

It comprises a series of deep red nodular mudstones, with some prominent grey limestone beds.

== See also ==
- List of fossiliferous stratigraphic units in Newfoundland and Labrador
- Inlet Group
