= Redmans Formation =

- Stratigraphic range: Late Cambrian –Early Ordovician
- Type: Formation
- Unit of: Bell Island Group

Lithology
- Primary: Marine sediments

Location
- Region: Newfoundland and Labrador
- Country: Canada
- Occurrence of the Redmans Formation in southeastern Newfoundland

The Redmans Formation is a formation cropping out in Newfoundland.
