= Blackbrook Reservoir Formation =

Geologic formation in Leicestershire, the United Kingdom

- Stratigraphic range: middle Ediacaran; ~611–569 Ma
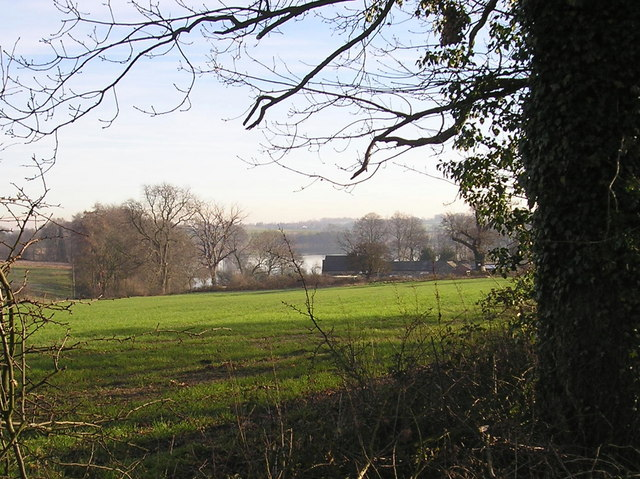
- Blackbrook Reservoir, which gave its name to the formation, which itself can be found here.
- Type: Formation
- Unit of: Blackbrook Group
- Underlies: Beacon Hill Formation
- Overlies: Ives Head Formation
- Thickness: 610 m (2,001 ft)

Lithology
- Primary: Tuff
- Other: Pelite, Mudstone, Siltstone, Sandstone

Location
- Coordinates: 52.757°N 1.324°W
- Region: Leicestershire
- Country: United Kingdom

Type section
- Named for: Blackbrook Reservoir
- Named by: Moseley et Ford
- Location: Blackbrook Reservoir and Quarry
- Year defined: 1985
- Thickness at type section: 550 m (1,804 ft)

The Blackbrook Reservoir Formation is an Ediacaran aged geologic formation in Leicestershire, and lies within the wider Blackbrook Reservoir area. It is primarily composed of tuffs, siltstone, and sandstone.

== Geology ==
The formation is roughly 610 m (2,001 ft) in thickness, which can be broken up into three distinct layers, although there are no members. At its base it is predominately composed of up to 210 m (689 ft) of tuffeceous pelites, dust tuff, and coarse-grained tuff. The middle layers of the formation only reaches up to 30 m (98 ft), being composed primarily of weathered coarse-grained tuffs, with tuffeceous pelites. Throughout the top of the formation, the previous tuffeceous pelites, dust tuff, and coarse-grained tuffs from the lower layers return, making up the rest of the 370 m (1,214 ft).

At its type section in Blackbrook Quarry, which is roughly 550 m (1,804 ft) thick, the formation is primarily composed instead of pale-gray to greenish-gray, finely laminated volcaniclastic mudstone and siltstones, which are intercalated with beds of fine-grained sandstone. At the contact point over the South Quarry Slump Breccia Member of the underlying Ives Head Formation, the composition of the rocks change to beds of laminated to massive volcaniclastic siltstone and sandstone, ranging between 0.2–0.4 m (1–1 ft) in thickness.

In the reference section in Newhurst Quarry, the formation is composed primarily of parallel laminated, massive, or normally graded volcaniclastic mudstone and siltstone. There can also be found, though more rarely, massive to normally graded beds of volcaniclastic sandstone, with individual sandstone beds graded down into massive matrix-supported breccia.
