= Inlet Group =

Unused geological term

The Inlet Group was proposed as a geological unit for southeastern Newfoundland. It was made up of the Brigus Formation, Chamberlain's Brook Fm, Manuels River Fm, Chapel Island Formation, Burnt Island Formation and the Random Formation

The inlet group term is no longer used as it was considered redundant to terminology used elsewhere on the island.
