= Fundy Group =

- Stratigraphic range: Triassic
- Type: Group
- Unit of: Newark Supergroup

Location
- Region: Nova Scotia
- Country: Canada

The Fundy Group is a geologic group in Nova Scotia. It preserves fossils dating back to the Triassic period.

== See also ==
- List of fossiliferous stratigraphic units in Nova Scotia
