= Mount Toby Formation =

Geologic formation in Massachusetts, United States

- Stratigraphic range: Jurassic
- Type: Formation
- Unit of: Newark Supergroup

Location
- Region: Massachusetts
- Country: United States

The Mount Toby Formation is a geologic formation in Massachusetts. It preserves fossils dating back to the Jurassic period.

== See also ==
- List of fossiliferous stratigraphic units in Massachusetts
- Paleontology in Massachusetts
