= Arisaig Group =

- Stratigraphic range: Silurian
- Type: Group

Location
- Region: Nova Scotia
- Country: Canada

The Arisaig Group is a geologic group in Nova Scotia. It preserves fossils dating back to the Silurian period.

== See also ==
- List of fossiliferous stratigraphic units in Nova Scotia
