= Heart's Content Formation =

Geologic formation in Newfoundland, Canada

- Stratigraphic range: Ediacaran
- Type: Formation
- Unit of: Musgravetown Group
- Sub-units: Bellevue Beach Member
- Underlies: Heart's Desire Formation
- Overlies: Maturin Ponds Formation
- Thickness: 600–1,000 m (2,000–3,300 ft)

Lithology
- Primary: Black Shale
- Other: Sandstone, Conglomerate

Location
- Region: Newfoundland
- Country: Canada

Type section
- Named by: King, 1988
- Occurrence of the Heart's Content Formation in southeastern Newfoundland

The Heart's Content Formation is an Ediacaran formation of dark grey/black shales interlaced with sandstones and pebble conglomerate, cropping out in Newfoundland.
