= Parrsboro Formation =

Geologic formation in Nova Scotia, Canada

- Stratigraphic range: Westphalian
- Type: Formation

Location
- Region: Nova Scotia
- Country: Canada

The Parrsboro Formation is a geologic formation in Nova Scotia. It preserves fossils dating back to the Carboniferous period.

== See also ==
- List of fossiliferous stratigraphic units in Nova Scotia
