= Rencontre Formation =

Geological formation

- Stratigraphic range: 552–538.8 Ma (approx)
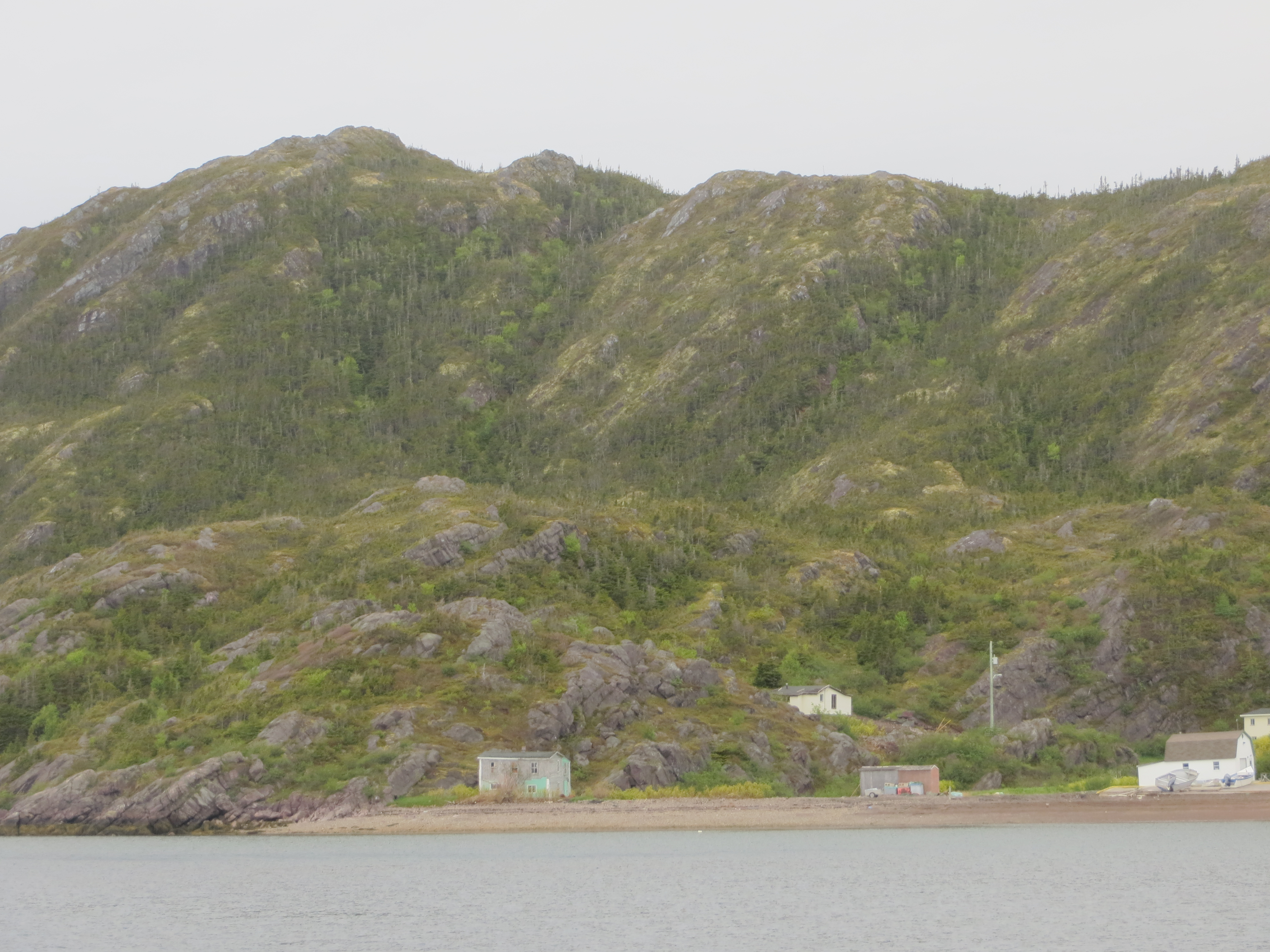
- Outcrops of the Rencontre Formation in Rencontre, NL.
- Type: Formation
- Unit of: (Long Harbour Group, in some schemes - e.g. NL GeoAtlas)
- Underlies: Chapel Island Fm
- Overlies: Long Harbour Group - volcanics - in Rencontre, Mooring Cove Formation
- Thickness: Hundreds of metres

Location
- Region: Newfoundland
- Country: Canada
- Outcrop distribution

The Rencontre Formation (locally pronounced Rown-Counter) is a geological formation just below the Cambrian-Ediacaran boundary in Newfoundland, deposited in a fault-bounded enclosed basin. U-Pb dates obtained just below its base give a maximum age of 552 ± 3 million years ago.

It is subdivided into five depositional phases, with two subsequent phases in a seven-phase series corresponding to the overlying Chapel Island Formation (900 m thick in this basin) and Random Formation (250 m thick in this basin).

1. Phase one - 300 m - conglomerate dominated, some sandstone and minor siltstones
2. Phase 2 - 150 m - sands and silts
3. Phase 3 - 180 m - silts and minor sands; lower silts are grey-green, glauconitic, wave-rippled and mud-cracked; upper silts becoming red
4. Phase 4 - 200 m - coarse sands
5. Phase 5 - greater than 200 m - arenites and red silts.
