= Bull Arm Formation =

Geologic formation in Newfoundland, Canada

- Stratigraphic range: Ediacaran
- Type: Formation
- Unit of: Musgravetown Group
- Underlies: Big Head Formation

Lithology
- Primary: Tuff

Location
- Region: Newfoundland
- Country: Canada
- Occurrence of the Bull Arm Formation in southeastern Newfoundland

The Bull Arm Formation is a volcanic Ediacaran formation cropping out in Newfoundland, the oldest of the Musgravetown Group, which is made up of Tuff, and various mafic flows.
