= Elliott's Cove Formation =

Geologic formation in Newfoundland, Canada

- Stratigraphic range: Middle Cambrian–Late Cambrian
- Type: Formation
- Unit of: Harcourt Group
- Overlies: Manuels River Formation

Lithology
- Primary: Marine sedimentary

Location
- Region: Newfoundland
- Country: Canada
- Occurrence of the Elliott's Cove Formation in southeastern Newfoundland

The Elliott’s Cove Formation is a Middle Cambrian rock unit in eastern Newfoundland, in the Random Island area. It forms part of the Harcourt Group and is composed mainly of thinly layered mudstone, siltstone, and fine-grained sandstone, typically grey to dark and locally rich in mica and organic material. These rocks were deposited in a shallow marine environment, the presence of trace fossils shows that the seafloor supported active marine life. Today, the formation is exposed in scattered outcrops on Random Island, where it has been folded and faulted during later tectonic events.
