= Smith Point Formation =

- Stratigraphic range: Tommotian
- Type: Formation
- Unit of: Adeyton Group
- Underlies: Brigus Formation (conformably)
- Overlies: Bonavista Fm (conformably)
- Thickness: 7 m (at type locality)

Location
- Region: Newfoundland
- Country: Canada

The Smith Point Formation is an Early Cambrian (c. Tommotian), fossil-rich, pink to brick red limestone formation cropping out in Newfoundland.

== Palaeontology ==
Its fossil assemblage includes trilobites, hyoliths, and microbialites (stromatolites/ oncolites).
