= Ives Head =

Protected area in Leicestershire, England

Coordinates: 52.749°N 1.293°W

- Site of Special Scientific Interest
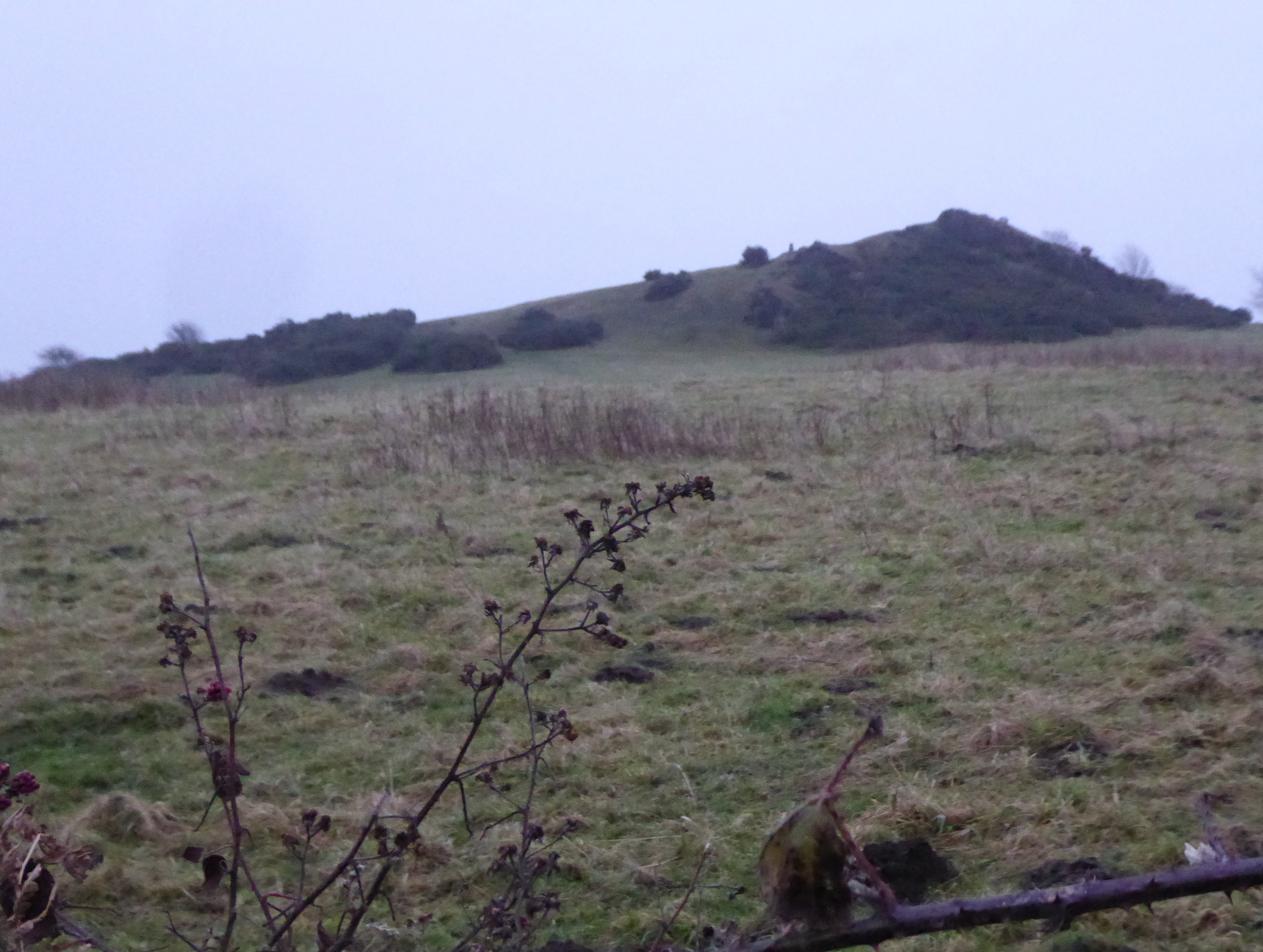
- Location of Ives Head.
- Area of search: Leicestershire
- Grid reference: SK 478 170
- Interest: Geological
- Area: 5.0 hectares (12 acres)
- Notification date: 2012
- Location map: Magic Map

Ives Head is a 5 hectares (12 acres) geological Site of Special Scientific Interest south of Shepshed in Leicestershire. It is a Geological Conservation Review site.

This site exposes volcaniclastic sandstones dating to the late Precambrian, around 600 million years ago. It is important for the global understanding of the early evolution of Ediacaran environments.

The site is private land with no public access.
