= Young's Cove Group =

- Stratigraphic range: 550–Early Cambrian Ma
- Occurrence of Young's Cove Group in southeastern Newfoundland
- Type: Group
- Sub-units: Random Formation; Chapel Island Formation; Rencontre Formation (sometimes placed in Long Harbour Group)

Location
- Region: Newfoundland and Labrador
- Country: Canada

Young's Cove Group is a stratigraphic group covering the Ediacaran-Cambrian boundary (in the Chapel Island Formation, cropping out on the Burin Peninsula and elsewhere in Newfoundland.

The Rencontre Formation is sometime included in this group, sometimes in the Long Harbour Group. That formation overlies volcanic rocks dated to 552 ± 2 million years ago.
