= Mabou Group =

- Stratigraphic range: Carboniferous
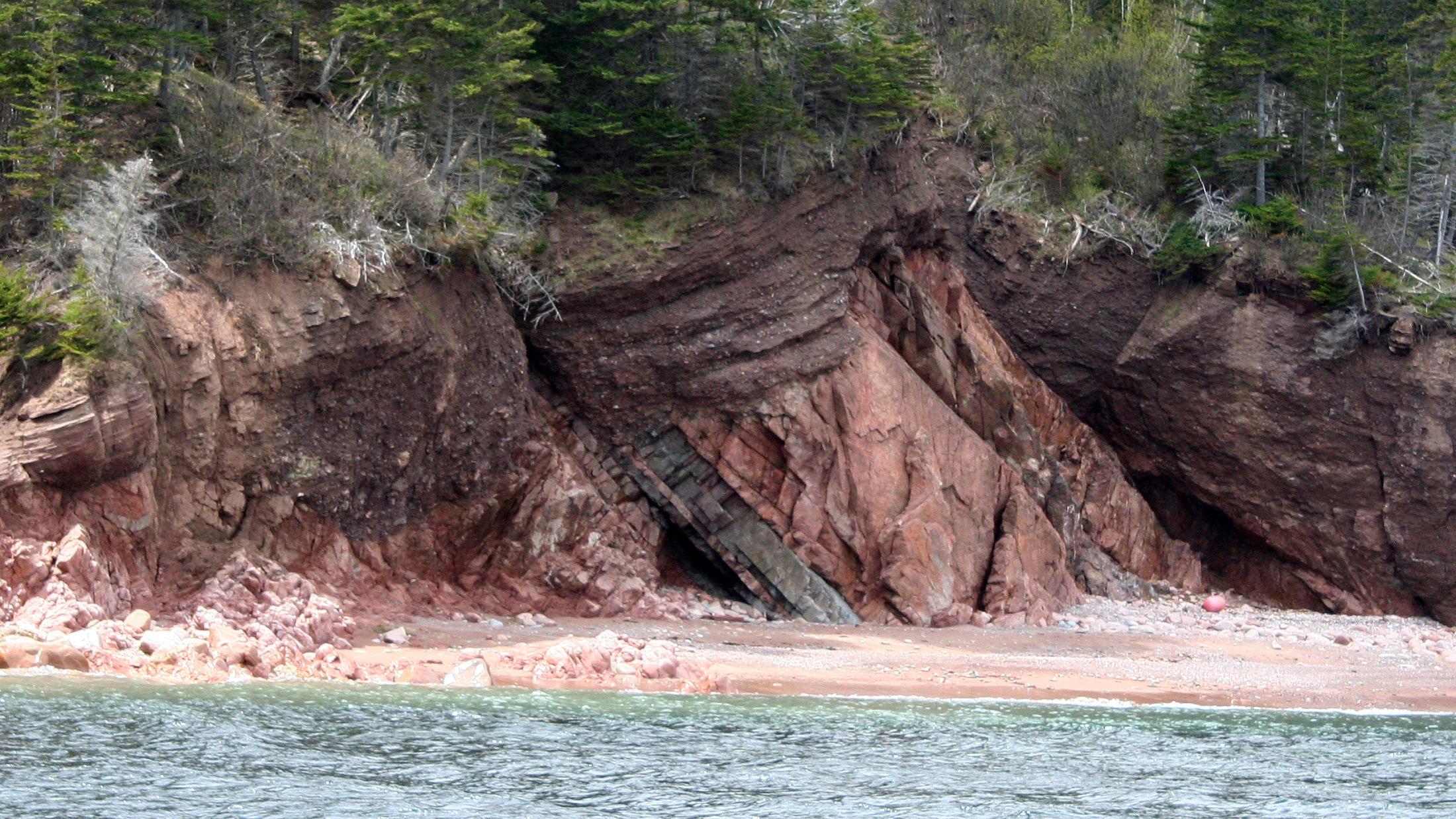
- Unconformity between the Mabou Group and Precambrian basement, Cape Breton, Nova Scotia.
- Type: Group

Location
- Region: Nova Scotia
- Country: Canada

The Mabou Group is a geologic group in Nova Scotia. It preserves fossils dating back to the Carboniferous period.

== See also ==
- List of fossiliferous stratigraphic units in Nova Scotia
