= Chapel Island Formation =

Sedimentary formation in Newfoundland, Canada

- Stratigraphic range: Ediacaran – Fortunian
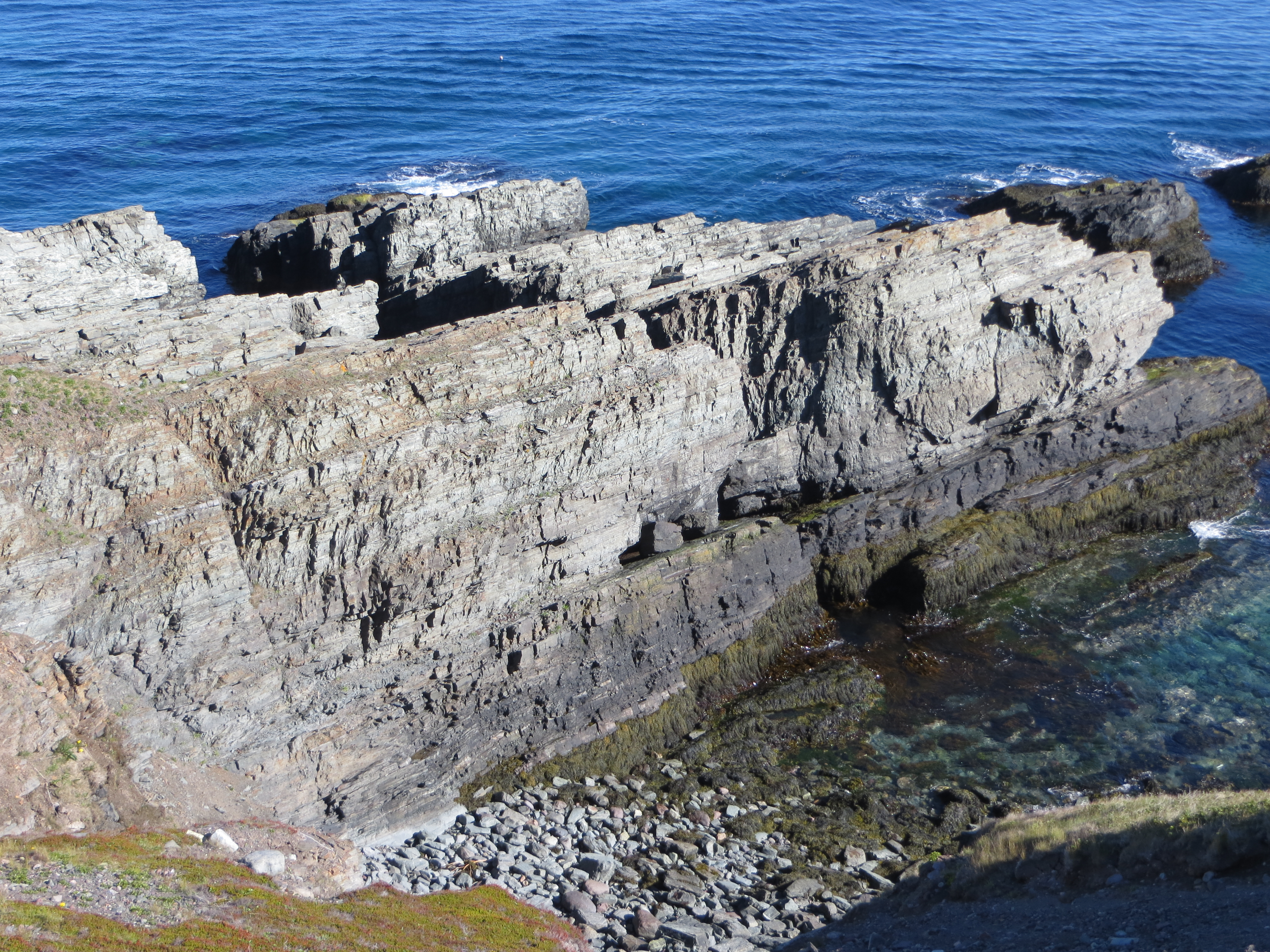
- Ediacaran–Cambrian boundary section at Fortune Head, Newfoundland, in the Chapel Island Formation. The darker units constituting the bottom 2–3 m of the outcrop correspond to Unit 1; the GSSP lies a couple of meters into Unit 2.
- Type: Formation
- Unit of: Young's Cove Group
- Underlies: Random Fm
- Overlies: Rencontre Fm
- Thickness: Hundreds of metres

Location
- Region: Newfoundland
- Country: Canada
- Outcrop distribution in southeast Newfoundland

The Chapel Island Formation is a sedimentary formation from the Burin Peninsula, Newfoundland, Canada. It is a succession of siliciclastic deposits, over 1,000 metres (3,300 ft) thick, that were deposited during the latest Ediacaran and earliest Cambrian.

== Stratigraphy ==
The formation's sequence stratigraphy is detailed in a journal article by Myrow and Hiscott. The formation starts in an intertidal zone, then, as the Cambrian progresses, becomes deeper water (outer shelf) as a general trend.

The Chapel Island Formation lies on top of the Rencontre Formation and below the Random Formation. It is 900 metres (3,000 ft) thick in Fortune Bay as a fault-bounded basin, consisting of grey-green siltstones and sandstones, with minor limestone beds near its top. Small shelly fossils have been recovered – primitive taxa only. The setting is nearshore or open shelf.

== Subdivisions ==
The formation is divided into six members, numbered 1 to 5, with Member 2 split into 2A and 2B. The Proterozoic–Cambrian boundary occurs 20.66 metres (67.8 ft) above the base of the formation, 2.4 metres (7.9 ft) into Member 2A.

The lowest occurrence of Treptichnus pedum in the succession is 16.25 metres (53.3 ft) above the base of the unit.

== See also ==
- Inlet Group
