= Big Head Formation =

Geologic formation in Newfoundland, Canada

- Stratigraphic range: Ediacaran
- Type: Formation
- Unit of: Musgravetown Group
- Underlies: Maturin Ponds Formation
- Overlies: Bull Arm Formation
- Thickness: 460-2130 m

Lithology
- Primary: Gren-red Arkose
- Other: Conglomerate

Location
- Region: Newfoundland
- Country: Canada
- Occurrence of the Big Head Formation in southeastern Newfoundland

The Big Head Formation is an Ediacaran formation cropping out in Newfoundland. It consists of gray to red arkose sandstone, alongside a granulated conglomerate.
