= Rocky Harbour Formation =

Rock formation in Canada

- Stratigraphic range: late Ediacaran; ~580–579 Ma
- Type: Formation
- Unit of: Musgravetown Group
- Underlies: Crown Hill Formation
- Overlies: Maturin Ponds Formation; Big Head Formation

Lithology
- Primary: Sandstone
- Other: Siltstone, Tuff, Diamictite

Location
- Region: Newfoundland
- Country: Canada

Type section
- Named by: Jenness 1963
- Occurrence of the Rocky Harbour Formation in southeastern Newfoundland

The Rocky Harbour Formation is an Ediacaran formation cropping out in Newfoundland. Its depositional setting was deltaic, with sediments showing the influence of tides and waves.

It is also known to preserve pre-Gaskiers glaciation fossils, in the form of palaeopascichnid specimens, around 579 Ma.

== Geology ==
The Rocky Harbour Formation is a part of the larger Musgravetown Group, and can be found outcropping on the Bonavista Peninsula in Newfoundland. It is overlain by the volcanic Crown Hill Formation, whilst it is underlain by the sandstone Big Head and Maturin Ponds Formations.

=== Facies ===
The Rocky Harbour Formation is composed of seven known facies, which are as follows, in rough stratigraphic order (lowest to highest):

- Plate Cove Facies: This facies is dominated by dark-purple to dark-grey clast-supported pebble conglomerate, which is intensely cleaved in nature. The facies in some areas gradually grades into the overlying Monk Bay Facies.
- Monk Bay Facies: This facies is primarily composed of thinly laminated green-grey siltstone in its lower section, with dark-gray to light-pink, medium to thick-cross-bedded, medium to coarse-grained sandstones in the middle section, with rippled clast-supported pebble conglomerate capping the facies. Throughout the facies there can also be found mud drapes.
- Cape Bonavista Facies: This facies is most well known for being composed of dark green-grey to light pink-grey, cross-bedded, medium to coarse-grained arkosic sandstones. The sandstone rocks are inter-bedded with black, well-rounded and sorted, medium-bedded granule and pebble conglomerates.
- Kings Cove Lighthouse Facies: This facies is predominately composed of grey, wavy-bedded, fine to medium-grained sandstone inter-beds, which also have dark-purple, thin way laminations and mud drapes. Throughout the facies, there can also be found rip-up clasts, symmetric wave ripples, and trough cross-bedding.
- Trinity Facies: This facies is composed of green siltstone and laminated dropstone diamictite, with well-rounded pebbles and cobbles found throughout.
- Herring Cove Facies: This facies is primarily composed of siliceous mudstone and wavy to parallel-laminated siltstone. There can also be found thick-bedded peperites, felsic dykes, rhyolite sills, thin to medium-bedded tuffs throughout the facies.
- Kings Cove North Facies: This facies is dominated by siliceous mudstone, as well as wavy to parallel-laminated siltstone and lenticular fine-grained sandstone.

== Paleobiota ==
The Rocky Harbour Formation was previously the oldest formation in Newfoundland to contain the oldest fossil material at 579 Ma, until it was beaten by the Mall Bay Formation at 580 Ma. The fossils in question are of the enigmatic palaeopascichnids, elongated to agglutinated organisms which consist of multiple sausage-shaped chambers or spherical or hemispherical chambers that occasionally branch.

Color key: Taxon / Reclassified taxon / Taxon falsely reported as present / Dubious taxon or junior synonym / Ichnotaxon / Ootaxon / Morphotaxon

Notes
Uncertain or tentative taxa are in small text
~~crossed out~~ taxa are discredited.

=== incertae sedis ===
| Genus | Species | Locality | Notes | Images |
|---|---|---|---|---|
| Orbisiana (?) | Orbisiana (?) sp. | Freshwater Trestle locality | Agglutinated, branching organism. | |
| Palaeopascichnus | P. linearis | Freshwater Trestle locality | Elongated, branching organism. | |
