= Manuels River Formation =

Geologic formation in Newfoundland and Labrador, Canada

- Stratigraphic range: Middle Cambrian
- Type: Formation
- Unit of: Harcourt Group
- Underlies: Elliott's Cove Formation
- Overlies: Chamberlains Brook Formation
- Thickness: 27.5 m (90 ft) (Random Island)

Location
- Country: Canada

Manuels River Formation is a Middle Cambrian (Drumian) geological formation cropping out in the Random Island area of Newfoundland and elsewhere?. Its black/dark brown, finely laminated mudstones and thicker-bedded siltstones are occasionally interrupted by thin yellowish silty limestone horizons.

== Fossil content ==
Recorded fossils include Clarella venusta (Billings, 1872) and Mawddachites hicksii (Salter, 1864).

== See also ==
Inlet Group
