= Knoydart Formation =

Geological formation

- Stratigraphic range: Devonian
- Type: Formation

Location
- Region: Nova Scotia
- Country: Canada

The Knoydart Formation is a geologic formation in Nova Scotia. It preserves fossils dating back to the Devonian period.

== See also ==
- List of fossiliferous stratigraphic units in Nova Scotia
