= Strenuaeva =

Strenuaeva Temporal range: Cambrian series 2

Scientific classification
- Kingdom: Animalia
- Phylum: Arthropoda
- Clade: †Artiopoda
- Class: †Trilobita
- Order: †Ptychopariida
- Family: †Ellipsocephalidae
- Genus: †Strenuaeva; Richter & Richter, 1940

Species
- Strenuaeva inflata Ahlberg and Bergström, 1978

Synonyms
- Hindermeyeria Hupé, 1953; Strenueva Richter & Richter, 1940

Extinct genus of trilobites

Strenuaeva is a genus of Cambrian trilobite thought to show sexual dimorphism.
