= Chamberlain's Brook Formation =

Geologic formation in Canada

- Stratigraphic range: Middle Cambrian; ~509–506 Ma
- Type: Formation
- Unit of: Adeyton Group
- Sub-units: Fossil Brook Member (and others)
- Underlies: Manuels River Formation (unconformably?)
- Thickness: up to 14 m (46 ft)

Lithology
- Primary: Green, purple and red siliciclastic marine mudstones

Location
- Region: Atlantic coast
- Country: United States; Canada
- Occurrence of the Chamberlain's Brook Formation in southeastern Newfoundland

The Chamberlain's Brook Formation is a thin but distinctive geologic formation of dark red calcareous mudstones that crops out from Rhode Island to Massachusetts and, Nova Scotia, New Brunswick and Newfoundland. It preserves fossils, including trilobites, dating back to the lower mid-Cambrian period. Its lowermost member is the Braintree Member (lowest Middle Cambrian) and the uppermost member is the Fossil Brook Member.

== See also ==
- List of fossiliferous stratigraphic units in Massachusetts
- Paleontology in Massachusetts
- Inlet Group
