= Wabana Group =

Rock group cropping out on Bell Island, Newfoundland

- Stratigraphic range: Early Ordovician–Middle Ordovician
- Type: Group
- Overlies: Bell Island Group

Lithology
- Primary: Siliciclastic marine

Location
- Region: Newfoundland
- Country: Canada
- Occurrence of the Wabana Group in southeastern Newfoundland

The Wabana Group is a group cropping out on Bell Island, Newfoundland.
