= Adeyton Group =

Geologic formation in Canada

- Stratigraphic range: Early Cambrian–Mid Cambrian
- Type: Group
- Sub-units: Chamberlain's Brook Formation; Brigus Formation; Smith Point Formation; Bonavista Formation
- Underlies: Harcourt Group
- Overlies: Young's Cove Group

Location
- Region: Newfoundland
- Country: Canada
- Occurrence of Adeyton Group in southeastern Newfoundland

Adeyton Group is a Cambrian stratigraphic group cropping out in Newfoundland.
