= Crown Hill Formation =

Geologic formation in Canada

- Stratigraphic range: 550 Ma
- Type: Formation
- Unit of: Musgravetown Group
- Underlies: Random Formation (conformably, in Random Island area); Others (elsewhere)
- Overlies: Rocky Harbour Formation

Lithology
- Primary: Volcanic non-marine

Location
- Region: Newfoundland
- Country: Canada
- Occurrence in southeast Newfoundland

Crown Hill Formation is a late Ediacaran volcanic non-marine sedimentary formation in Newfoundland. It's topped off with a bright red conglomerate, with silt and arkose sands of similar hue too.

It's subdivided into nine facies, including (on Random Island) Brook Point, Duntara Harbour, Red Cliff (with Bluye Point Horizon subfacies') and Broad Head. (on Cape St Mary's) Cross Pt Member, Hurricane Brook Mmbr
