= Bell Island Group =

Geologic group in Canada

- Stratigraphic range: Late Cambrian – Early Ordovician
- Occurrence of the Bell Island Group in southeastern Newfoundland
- Type: Group
- Sub-units: Redmans Formation
- Underlies: Wabana Group

Location
- Region: Newfoundland
- Country: Canada

The Bell Island Group is a Group of marine sedimentary strata cropping out in Bell Island, Newfoundland. The sediments include dark grey to black clay-bearing, silt-rich mudstones interbedded with cross-stratified fine sandstone, and intense bioturbation by trace fossils. The sandstone and mudstone intervals appear to reflect deposition under strong wave/storm processes.
