= Musgravetown Group =

- Stratigraphic range: Ediacaran
- Type: Group
Sub-units
- Crown Hill Formation
- Rocky Harbour Formation
(in Random Island map area)
- Trinny Cove Formation
(elsewhere?)
- (Heart's Desire Fm)
- Heart's Content Fm
(on Cape St Mary's Peninsula)
- Maturin Ponds Fm
- Big Head Fm
- Bull Arm Formation
- Underlies: Bonavista Group (unconformably)
- Overlies: Connecting Point Group

Location
- Region: Newfoundland
- Country: Canada
- Occurrence of the Musgravetown Group in southeastern Newfoundland

The Musgravetown Group is a terminal Ediacaran stratigraphic group of terrestrialish sandstones, lavas and tuffs cropping out in Newfoundland.

It corresponds temporally to the Signal Hill Group further east.

Mills and Sandeman (2021) proposed elevating the Musgravetown Group to supergroup rank, subdivided into the Crown Hill Group, Rocky Harbour Group and Bull Arm Group.
