= Nova Scotia Route 242 =

Highway in Nova Scotia, Canada

Route 242

Route information
- Maintained by Nova Scotia Department of Transportation and Infrastructure Renewal
- Length: 16 km (9.9 mi)

Major junctions
- West end: Route 209 in Joggins
- East end: Route 302 in Maccan

Location
- Country: Canada
- Province: Nova Scotia
- Counties: Cumberland

Highway system
- Provincial highways in Nova Scotia; 100-series
← Route 239	→ Route 245

Route 242 is an east-west collector road in the northwest of the Canadian province of Nova Scotia, following the Chignecto Bay, an inlet of the Fundy Bay. It is lightly trafficked, 16 kilometers long, and goes across mostly forested lands. It is paved entirely by asphalt.

It is located in Cumberland County and connects Joggins at Route 209 with Maccan at Route 302. It is designated as part of the Fundy Shore Scenic Drive.

== Route ==
Route 242 begins at the northern terminus of Route 209, at Joggins where is immediately leaves the river. The route then reaches River Hebert. It then bifurcates towards the north for a short distance to follow Herbert River, afterwards it turns east for 8 kilometers, until Maccan, where it terminates at a T-intersection with Route 302.

== Communities ==
- Joggins
- River Hebert
- Strathcona
- Lower River Hebert
- Jubilee
- Maccan

== See also ==
- List of Nova Scotia provincial highways

== Sources ==
- MapArt (2008). Canada back road atlas / atlas des rangs et chemins. Oshawa, Ontario: MapArt Publishing. ISBN 978-1-55368-614-9.
