= List of rivers of Nova Scotia =

Nova Scotia's rivers all flow into the Atlantic Ocean through four unique watersheds: the Gulf of Maine, the Northumberland Strait, the Gulf of Saint Lawrence and into the Atlantic Ocean itself.

== Gulf of Maine ==
The Gulf of Maine system includes the Bay of Fundy, which includes the Cumberland and Minas Basins. In Nova Scotia, the system occupies the shores from Fort Lawrence to Cape St. Mary (44°05′N).

=== Bay of Fundy ===
The Bay of Fundy coastline in Nova Scotia begins at Fort Lawrence and circles Cape Chignecto eastward to Truro. It then follows west along the Annapolis Valley as far as Brier Island on the Digby Neck. Within the Bay of Fundy are two basins: Chignecto Bay which begins at Fort Lawrence and ends at Cape Chignecto, and the Minas Basin that encompasses everything east of Ramshead Point (near Diligent River) and Cape Split.

- Apple River (Note: westernmost river on the north coast of the Bay of Fundy)
- Fox River
- Ramshead River
- Diligent River (Note: easternmost river on the north coast of Bay of Fundy)
- Annapolis River (Note: easternmost river on the south coast of Bay of Fundy)
- Nictaux River
- Moose River
- Bear River
- Little River

=== Minas Basin ===
The Minas Basin flows into the Bay of Fundy between Ramshead Point and Cape Split.

- Habitant River
- Gaspereau River
- Black River
- Avon River

- Halfway River (Kings County)

- Cogmagun River
- River Hebert

- Halfway River (Cumberland County)
- Kennetcook River
- St. Croix River

- Cornwallis River
- Walton River
- Tennycape River
- Noel River
- East Noel River
- Shubenacadie River
- Stewiacke River
- Five Mile River
- Nine Mile River
- St. Andrews River
- Gays River
- Salmon River
- North River
- Chiganois River
- Debert River
- Folly River
- Great Village River
- Portapique River
- Bass River
- West Bass River
- Little Bass River
- Economy River
- East River
- North River
- Harrington River
- Moose River
- Farrells River

=== Gulf of Maine ===
The Gulf of Maine coastline in Nova Scotia begins at Brier Island and continues to Cape St. Mary.

- Sissiboo River
- Rivière Grosses Coques
- Belliveau River
- Meteghan River
- Salmon River
- Indian River
- Chebogue River
- Little River
- Tusket River
- Abrams River

== Atlantic Ocean ==
The Atlantic Ocean coastline in Nova Scotia begins at Cape Sable Island and continues to Cape Canso (45°20′N 61°0′W). The list is divided into the geographical shorelines in the province.

=== South Shore ===
The South Shore extends from Cape Sable Island to Halifax Harbour.

- Barrington River
- Clyde River
- Round Bay River
- Roseway River
- Jordan River
- Sable River
- Broad River
- Five Rivers
- Mersey River
- Shelburne River
- Medway River
- Petite Rivière
- LaHave River
- Mushamush River
- Martins River
- Vaughns River
- Gold River
- Middle River
- East River
- Little East River
- Ingram River
- Prospect River
- Terence Bay River

=== Eastern Shore ===
The Eastern Shore extends from Halifax Harbour to the Strait of Canso.

- Tillmann Brook
- Sackville River
- Little Sackville River
- Little Salmon River
- Chezzetcook River
- Musquodoboit River
- West River Sheet Harbour
- East River Sheet Harbour
- Salmon River
- Quoddy River
- Moser River
- Ecum Secum River
- Liscombe River
- St. Mary's River
- Indian River
- Country Harbour River
- Isaacs Harbour River
- Costley River
- Garry River
- New Harbour River
- Larrys River
- Salmon River
- Milford Haven River
- Roman Valley River
- Clam Harbour River
- St. Francis Harbour River

== Gulf of Saint Lawrence ==
The Gulf of Saint Lawrence coastline in Nova Scotia begins at Cape Canso (45°20′N 61°0′W) and continues to Cape George Point.

=== Cape Breton Island ===
- Aspy River
- Ingonish River
- North River
- Sydney River
- Mira River
- Framboise River
- Grand River
- Graham River
- Broad Cove River
- Margaree River
- Chéticamp River
- Mackenzie River
- Grand Anse River

==== Bras d'Or Lake ====
- River Denys
- Middle River
- Baddeck River
- Skye River
- Georges River

=== St. George's Bay ===
- Wrights River
- Little Tracadie River
- Tracadie River
- Afton River
- Pomquet River
- Black Avon River
- Alder River
- South River
- West River

== Northumberland Strait ==
The Northumberland Strait coastline in Nova Scotia begins at Cape George Point and continues to the Tidnish River.

- Ohio River
- James River
- Rights River
- North River
- Barneys River
- French River
- Sutherlands River
- boat harbour (out fall)
- East River of Pictou
- Middle River of Pictou
- West River of Pictou
- Big Caribou River
- Caribou River
- Toney River
- River John
- Waughs River
- Black River
- French River
- Dewar River
- Wallace River
- Pugwash River
- River Philip
- Little River
- Goose River
- Shinimicas River
- Tidnish River

== See also ==
- List of rivers of Canada
