= Barrington, Nova Scotia =

Barrington is the name of several places in Nova Scotia, a Canadian Atlantic province, and may refer to:

== Districts and communities ==
Municipality of the District of Barrington, a large district municipality in Shelburne County on the southwestern tip of the province

- Barrington, Nova Scotia (community), a rural community of about 4,000 people just east of the northern corner of Barrington Bay
- Barrington Head, Nova Scotia, a community on a headland on the northern end of Barrington Bay, between the communities of Barrington and Barrington West
- Barrington Passage, Nova Scotia, a community on the western side of Barrington Bay just north of Cape Sable Island and about 5 km south of Barrington West
- Barrington West, Nova Scotia, a community west of Barrington Head

== Geographical features ==
- Barrington Bay, a bay on the southwestern tip of the province including the waters off the north end of Cape Sable Island
- Barrington Lake, a lake about 4 kilometres (2.5 mi) north of the community of Barrington
- Barrington River (Nova Scotia), a river running from Barrington Lake to Barrington Bay

== See also ==
- Barrington River (disambiguation)
