= Halfway River (disambiguation) =

Halfway River is a tributary of the Peace River in northeastern British Columbia, Canada.

Halfway River may also refer to:

- Halfway River (Avon River tributary) in Kings County, Nova Scotia
- Halfway River (River Hebert tributary) in Cumberland County, Nova Scotia
- Halfway River, Nova Scotia, a village in Cumberland County near the River Hebert
