= Sackville River =

Coordinates: 44°43′59″N 63°39′57″W

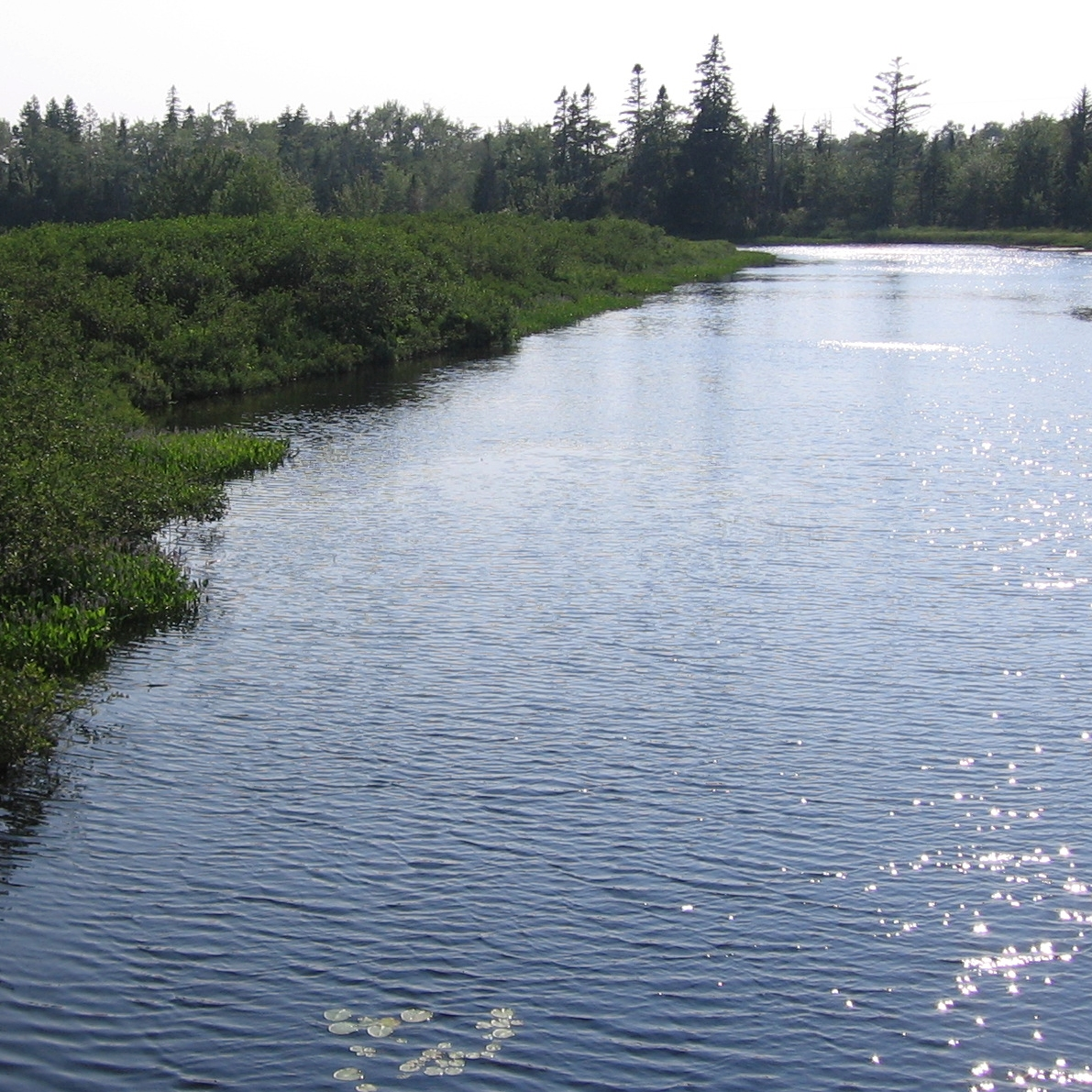
- Sackville River as seen from Highway 101 near Upper Sackville, Nova Scotia

- Location of mouth

Location
- Country: Canada
- Province: Nova Scotia

Physical characteristics
- Source
  - location: near Pentz Lake, East Hants
- Mouth
  - location: Bedford Basin
  - elevation: sea level
- Length: 40 km (25 mi)
- Basin size: 996 km^{2} (385 sq mi)

The Sackville River is a river in Hants County and Halifax Regional Municipality, Nova Scotia, Canada. It empties into Bedford Basin. The Little Sackville River is a tributary.

== 2023 flood ==
On July 21, 2023, a record 250+ millimetres of rain fell on the communities of Bedford and Lower Sackville in a period of seven hours, which is the three-month average in precipitation for Halifax, leading to the Sackville River to overflow like never before. Water levels eventually became so high that eventually vehicles were stalling and completely submerging on the nearby Highway 102 at the intersection for Highway 101, one of the busiest intersections in Nova Scotia, leading to the closure of both highways at Lower Sackville.

The flood led to the evacuation of Bedford Place and over 300 people in residences of the Union Street neighbourhood in Bedford. Despite initial reports of there being 4.5 feet of water inside of the mall, Bedford Place denied this rumour and confirmed max water levels on the interior of the mall reached six inches, but the mall was still closed as of 8 pm July 22 as the river was still consuming the parking lot. Halifax Search & Rescue was required to rescue mall employees on the night of the storm who were stuck in the floodwaters. Fish Hatchery Park, located at the mouth of the river in the Bedford Basin, was closed due to erosion destabilizing the entire ground of the park.

== Tributaries ==
- Little Sackville River
- Tomahawk Run
- Peverill's Brook

== Lakes ==
- McCabe Lake
- Webber Lake

== Communities ==
- Mount Uniacke
- Lower Sackville
- Middle Sackville
- Upper Sackville
- Bedford
- Hammonds Plains
- Beaverbank

== See also ==
- List of rivers of Nova Scotia
