= Pisiguit =

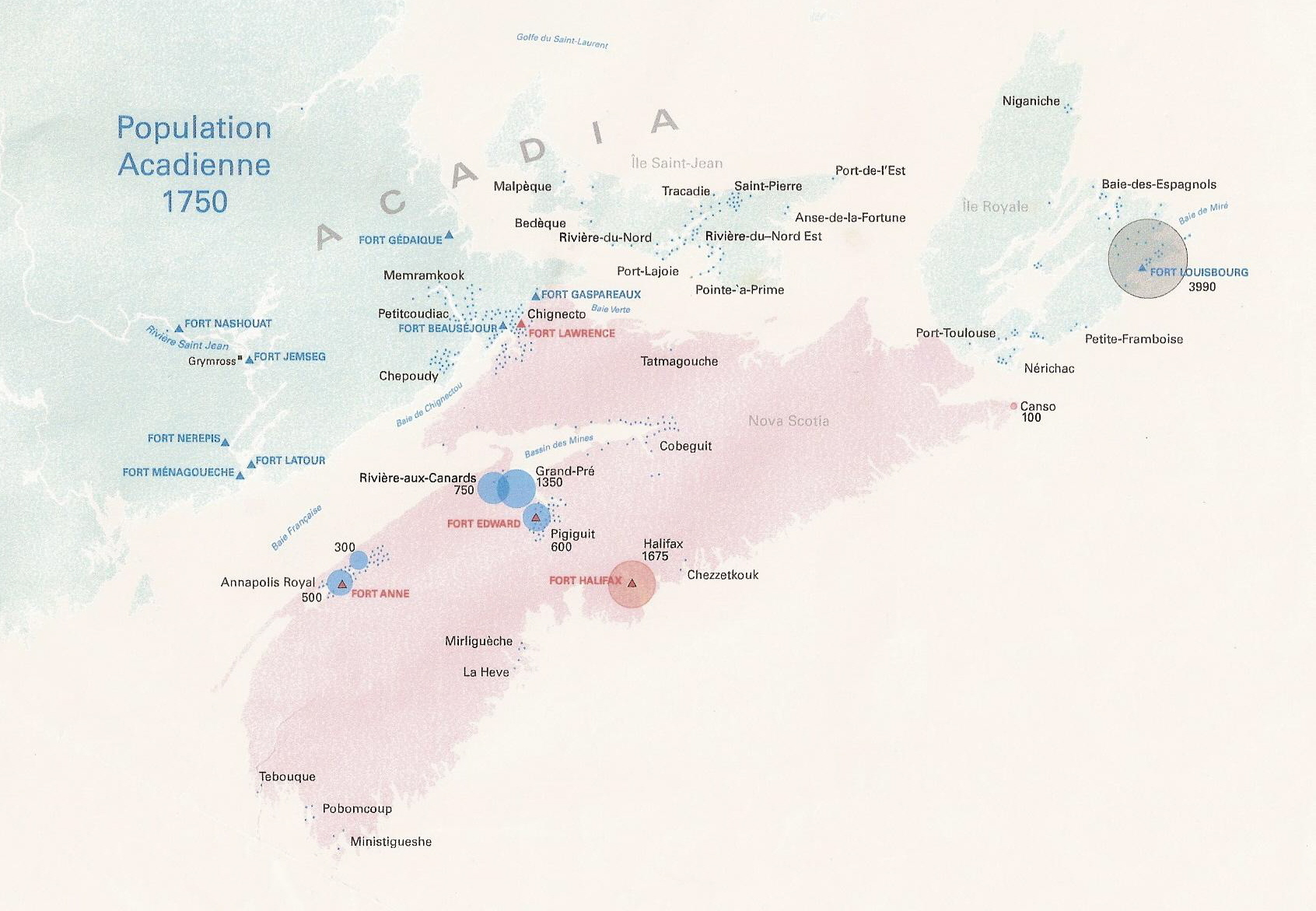
Population of Pisiguit in 1750

Pisiguit is the pre-expulsion-period Acadian region located along the banks of the Avon River (known as the Pisiquit River to the Acadians) from its confluence with the Minas Basin of Acadia, which is now Nova Scotia, including the St. Croix River drainage area. Settlement in the region commenced simultaneous to the establishment of Grand-Pré. Many villages (Rivet, Foret, Babin, Landry, Thibodeau, Vincent, etc.) spread rapidly eastward along the river banks. These settlements became known as Pisiguit or (Pisiquit, Pigiguit, Pisiquid, Pisiguid). The name is from the Mi'kmaq Pesaquid, meaning "Junction of Waters". In 1714, there were 351 people (in 56 families) there.

== Population ==
By the mid-18th century, a memoire from 1748 noted that there were 2,700 people in Pisiguit compared to 2,400 in the Grand Pré and Canard area, but the area lost its population rather quickly. Pisiguit was the Acadian settlement closest to Halifax, which was a newly forming English settlement. In the late 1740s and into the 1750s relations between France and Britain remained tense. After the establishment of Halifax in 1749, tensions broke out into open conflict across Nova Scotia in an undeclared war that would eventually become part of the larger conflict of the Seven Years' War. Both French and English powers created disturbances that destabilized the Minas area. Attacks on English forces at Grand Pré led to the building of Fort Edward in 1750. Attacks such as that at Five Houses on the St Croix River (Battle at St. Croix) and the actions of Le Loutre and his Mi'kmaq allies further led to difficulties. This caused many Pisiguit Acadians, particularly along the Cobequid shore, to pack up and leave, heading mainly toward the Chignecto area and Ile Saint-Jean (Prince Edward Island). By 1755, based on Charles Morris's remarks concerning the removal of the Acadians, there were about 1,400 people left there (about 800 on the left bank, about 100 on the right bank and Kennetcook River, and about 500 on the St. Croix River and today's Windsor area.

Pisiguit had two parishes: La Sainte Famille and L'Assomption. At first, Pisiguit had only one parish (Sainte Famille), founded on Aug. 8, 1698. Population increases and difficulty crossing the heavily tidal Pisiquit River necessitated the creation of a second parish. The Bishop of Quebec issued an edict creating the second (l'Assomption) on June 28, 1722. Ste-Famille retained the lands to the west of the Pisiquit while the new parish of l'Assumption covered the lands to east. Although these parishes were established seldom were there enough priests to oversee the needs of the people. Being stationed at a particular parish, they would then travel to surrounding parishes as regularly as possible (for a list of Acadian colonial period priests at or serving Pisiquit see separate section below). The shortage of priests is evidenced by the fact that in 1749, the l'Assomption parish protested to the bishop of Quebec that they had no priest.

NOTE: The Acadian dictionary notes that L'Assomption was at Pisiguit west, and Ste. Famille was at Pisiguit east, but the Ste. Famille cemetery was found on the west side of the river?

Priests at Pisiquit:

Priest	Dates	Parishes served in	Religious Order
Jean Buisson de Saint-Cosme	1692-1698	Minas	Secular
Felix Pain	1701-1732 (approx.)	Beaubassin, Ile Royal, Minas, Port Lajoie	Recollet
Bonaventure Masson	1704-1715	Minas, Port Royal	Recollet
Lucien Verger	1721	Minas	Recollet
Ignace Flament	1724-1728	Chignecto, Minas	Recollet
Isadore Caulet	1730-1745	Louisbourg, Minas, Pisiquit, Port Lajoie	Recollet
Jean-Baptiste Chauvreulx	1735-1755	Minas, Pisiquit, Pobomcoup	Sulpician
Jean-Baptiste de Guy-Desenclaves	1739-1758	Annapolis Royal, Minas, Pobomcoup	Sulpician
Laboret	1741-1746	Annapolis Royal, Beaubassin, Minas, Pointe-Prim	Secular
Jacques Girard	1742-1758	Cobequid, Minas, Pointe-Prim	Secular (seminary of Quebec)
Francois la Marie	1752-1755	Pisiquit, Riviéré aux Canards	Spiritan
Henri Daudin	1753-1755	Annapolis Royal, Pisiquit	Spiritan

Pisiquit Area Churches and Chapels

Structure	Location	Dates
Parish Church	l'Assomption	1722-1750 (pulled down to make way for Fort Edward)
Chapel	Ville Foret	? - 1756 (burned)
Parish Church	Sainte-Famille	1698 - 1755 (burned)
Chapel	Trahan	?- 1756 (burned)

== Expulsion ==
Fort Edward was built in 1750 on a point of land where the St. Croix and Pisiquit rivers meet. The first commandant was Capt. Gorham (he was wounded at the Battle at St. Croix on his earlier march from Halifax). After that, Captain Alexander Murray, became in charge of the fort. The fort had been built to verify the Acadians in Pisiguit and to control the passageway for ships trying to sail to the Bay of Fundy.?

On September 5, 1755, the Acadians were told to assemble at the fort where they learnt of their expulsion. 1066 people of Pisiguit were boarded on four vessels, the Neptune, the Three Friends, the Dolphin, and the Ranger. This took place on October 13, but it was only on Monday October 20, that they left to meet with ships in the Minas Basin, leaving Grand Pré, to sail in convoy to New England, Maryland, and other ports in the Thirteen Colonies. The English did not burn the farms in the village as had happened in some of the other communities in the region. In the ensuing guerilla warfare that took place between 1755 and 1758, farms were burnt by both sides. Many buildings remained standing though as they were distributed by lottery after 1760 to the New England Planters who settled on the Acadians former lands.

On November 19, 1775, 156 inhabitants of Pisiguit arrived in Philadelphia, and others in December. Amongst the first Acadians to reach Louisiana, the majority were from Pisiguit and Beaubassin.

The Acadian people never again received permission to resettle Pisiguit, but some of them settled other parts of the Maritimes to rebuild their lives. After the expulsion, Fort Edward was used as a site to hold Acadians.

== Post expulsion ==
In 1759, 50 New England Planter families were settled in Piziquid by Amos Fuller and John Hicks of Rhode Island and 50 more in 1760. The government provided grants of land and supplies of tools, arms, ammunition, and one bushel of corn per person per month for a year. In July, they had a drawing for 28 lots to see who got the boards, timber, and buildings the Acadians left behind. For example, James Wilson and Joseph Northup got barn #8 and house #13. In July 1762, 130 Acadian men were brought from Ft. Edward to Halifax. This left (according to a count on August 9, 1752) 313 Acadians being held at Ft. Edward ... 21 men, 90 women, and 202 children.

By 1763, the communities of Horton, Falmouth, Cornwallis, and Newport had a population of 1936 (in 367 families). There were more Acadian prisoners on the east side of the Piziquid than there were settlers in West Falmouth (356). The Acadian prisoners were hired (4 shillings/day) by the new immigrants to help fix the dikes in the new settlements.

After the close of the Seven Years' War and the removal of the prohibition on Acadians residing in the Province, a few Acadians attempted to reestablishment themselves in the area. These efforts generally failed and they removed themselves to the St. Mary's Bay area on the western shore of Nova Scotia. Windsor was formed in 1764. Anslow mentions the remains of Acadian dykes near "the Island Acadian Burying Ground."

== Sainte Famille Cemetery ==
In summer 1996, a work crew was excavating the ground to begin construction on Gabriel Road in the Mountain View Subdivision near Falmouth, Nova Scotia. After finding bones in the soil, David Christianson of the Nova Scotia Museum was called to come out to the site. He found a couple of skeletons and over 2 dozen graves. The graves were identified by clay caps which were about a foot under the surface. The graves were five feet deeper. Wrought-iron square nails and fragments of wood dated the graves to the 18th century. A King George III halfpenny and ceramic button from the 18th century were also found. The discover of the graves placed the area under the provincial Special Places Protection Act. Though the uncovered graves were scheduled to be studied, those not disturbed would be left in place. It is estimated that the site contains over 300 graves. Construction plans ceased and a committee was formed to take care of the situation. Lot #7, which contains about 70% of the cemetery site was soon purchased. The committee also borrowed money to purchase the remainder of the cemetery on lot #6. The Sainte Famille church is thought to have been located on the site of lot #8, which is covered by a house. The skeletal remains were reburied and a memorial park now commemorates the site.
