= Maccan River (Nova Scotia) =

Coordinates: 45°45′59.9″N 64°19′56.9″W

Maccan

Location
- Country: Canada
- Province: Nova Scotia

Physical characteristics
- Mouth
  - location: Confluence of River Hebert
  - elevation: sea level
- Basin size: 1,304 km^{2} (503 sq mi)(together with Kelly River / River Hebert)

Basin features
- Progression: River Hebert—Cumberland Basin—Chignecto Bay—Bay of Fundy

The Maccan River is a small tidal river contained completely within Cumberland County, Nova Scotia. The river terminates at the confluence of River Hebert at Amherst Point, and empties into the Cumberland Basin. The river's tidal bore may be viewed from the Tidal Wetlands Park in Maccan. According to estimates by the Province of Nova Scotia, there are 9,092 people resident within the Maccan/Kelly/Hebert watershed in 2011.

Tributaries include the Nappan River, Patton Creek, St. Georges Brook, and Kennedy Creek. The river passes through the communities of Maccan and Athol, Nova Scotia. The word Maccan is derived from the Miꞌkmaq word 'Maakan' meaning a good place for fishing.

The main line of the Canadian National Railway follows the Maccan River for part of its length.

== See also ==
- List of rivers of Nova Scotia
