= Lucasville =

Lucasville can refer to:

- Lucasville, Ohio
- Lucasville, Ontario
- Lucasville, Nova Scotia
- Southern Ohio Correctional Facility (commonly referred to as Lucasville)
