= Millwood High School =

Millwood High School may refer to:

- Millwood High School (Nova Scotia)
- Millwood High School (Oklahoma)
