= St. Croix, Nova Scotia =

Community in Nova Scotia, Canada

Coordinates: 44°58′0″N 64°1′59″W

Location of St. Croix in Nova Scotia

St. Croix is a community in the Canadian province of Nova Scotia, located in Hants County.

It is located along Highway 101, on St. Croix River, east of Windsor.

== Battle at St Croix (1750) ==
The Battle at St. Croix happened during Father Le Loutre's War between New England Rangers and the Mi'kmaq. To capture the Acadians involved in the British defeat at the Fort Logis, Grand Pre the previous year, Cornwallis sent John Gorham to Piziquid to construct Fort Edward and imprison the Acadians. After two days of marching from Fort Sackville (present day Bedford), they come to the St Croix River. At the river a battle broke out with the Mi'kmaq. Gorham took over a saw mill and two local Acadian homes for protection. The Mi'kmaq numbers continued to grow, therefore Gorham sent a messenger to Fort Sackville for reinforcements.

== St Croix Recreation Park ==
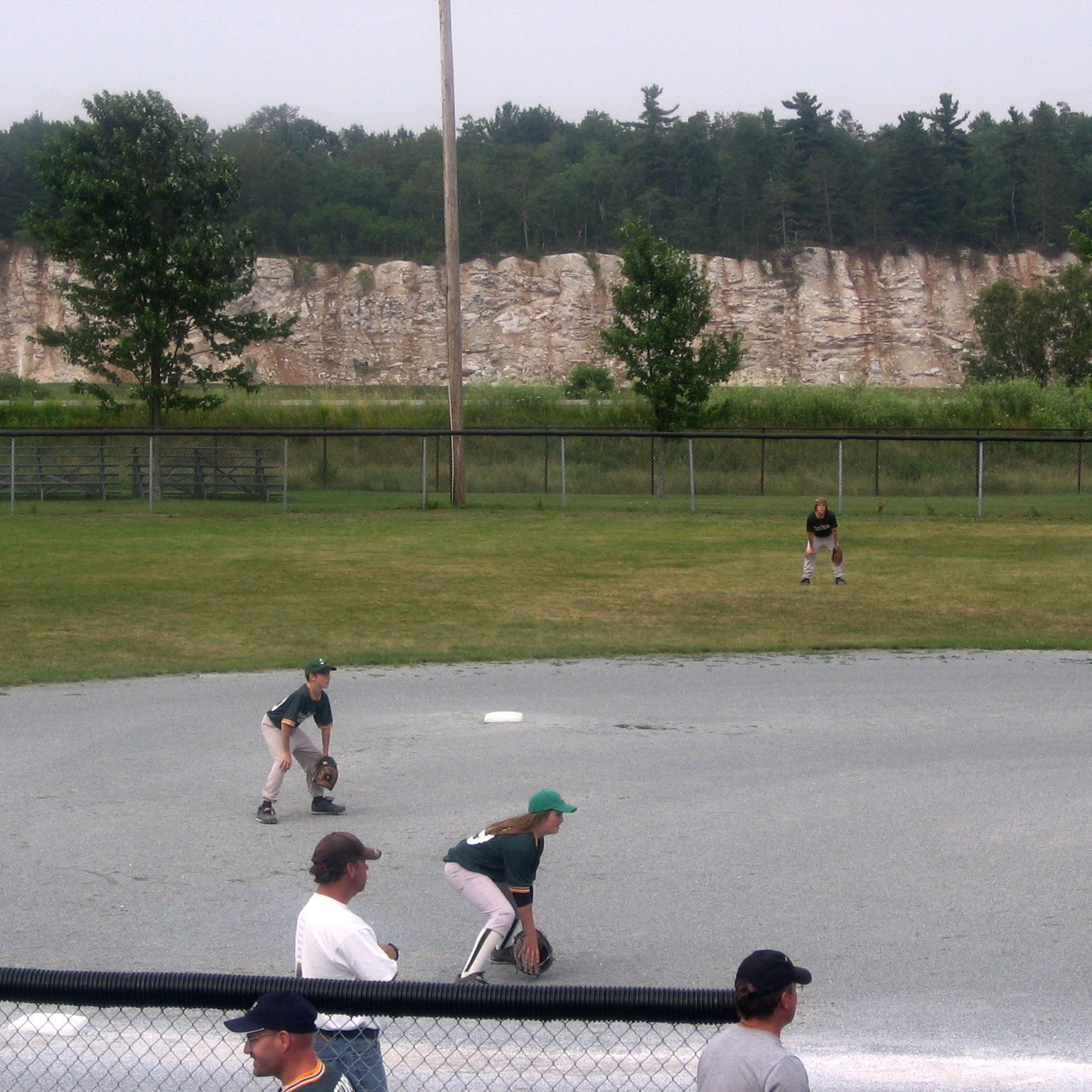
St Croix Recreation Park showing distinctive gypsum cliffs in the background

The St Croix Recreation Park consists of two softball diamonds adjacent to each other. The fields have been host to many national softball events, including the 1998 and 2004 Canadian Senior Men's Fastpitch Championships, the 2000 Canadian Midget Fastpitch Championship (when Central Frontenac Cyclones went undefeated to win gold), the Eastern Canadian Fastpitch Championships, and numerous other Nova Scotia provincial tournaments.

The main tenants of the park are teams that represent the West Hants Thunder Minor Softball Association and other teams from the West Hants area that use the field for recreational leagues. The field was also home to the Halifax-Windsor Keiths. The team disbanded after the 2004 Canadian Senior Men's Fastpitch Championships.

The largest crowd known to watch an event at the facility was approximately 5,500 people, for the championship game between the Halifax-Windsor Keiths and the Halifax Jaguars for the 1998 Canadian Senior Men's Fastpitch Championship.

== See also ==
- List of communities in Nova Scotia
