= Wallace River (Nova Scotia) =

Wallace
- Location of the mouth of the Wallace River

Location
- Country: Canada
- Province: Nova Scotia

Physical characteristics
- Source: Dicks Meadows
  - location: Cobequid Mountains
  - coordinates: 45°33′25.50″N 63°34′1.78″W
  - elevation: 350 m (1,150 ft)
- Mouth: Wallace Bay
  - location: Wallace Bridge
  - coordinates: 45°48′47.7252″N 63°30′57.89″W
  - elevation: 0 m (0 ft)
- Length: 45.5 km (28.3 mi)
- Basin size: 394 km^{2} (152 sq mi)
- Discharge
  - location: mouthapprox.

The Wallace River is a river running mostly through Cumberland County, Nova Scotia, Canada.

== See also ==
- List of rivers of Nova Scotia
