= River Hebert =

Coordinates: 45°41′26.5″N 64°22′25″W

Location
- Country: Canada
- Province: Nova Scotia

Physical characteristics
- Mouth
  - location: Cumberland Basin
  - elevation: sea level
- Basin size: 1,304 km^{2} (503 sq mi)(together with Kelley River / Maccan River)

Basin features
- Progression: Cumberland Basin—Chignecto Bay—Bay of Fundy

The River Hebert is a small tidal river that empties into the Cumberland Basin, and is contained completely within Cumberland County, Nova Scotia. According to estimates by the Province of Nova Scotia, there were 9,092 people resident within the Maccan/Kelley/Hebert watershed in 2011.

== See also ==
- List of rivers of Nova Scotia
