= Upper Sackville, Nova Scotia =

Coordinates: 44°48′20″N 63°45′01″W

Upper Sackville in Nova Scotia

Upper Sackville is a Canadian suburban community in Halifax, Nova Scotia, Canada. Before European colonization, the land was inhabited for thousands of years by the Mi'kmaq. Later, the community was named after George Germain, 1st Viscount Sackville.

Upper Sackville is situated in the Sackville River valley immediately north of Middle Sackville and south of Mount Uniacke on Trunk 1. It is approximately 35 km (22 mi) by road from Downtown Halifax.
