= Bedford Basin =

Bay in Nova Scotia, Canada

Coordinates: 44°42′N 63°38′W

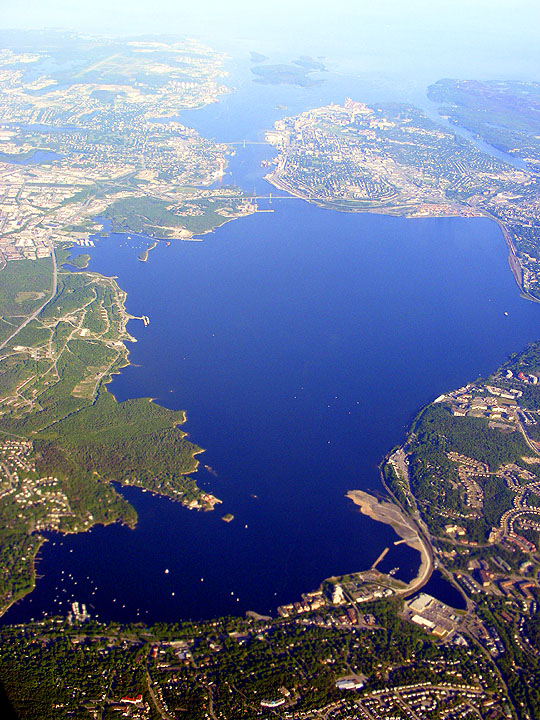
An aerial view of Bedford Basin looking southeast.

Bedford Basin is a large enclosed bay, forming the northwestern end of Halifax Harbour on Canada's Atlantic coast. It is named in honour of John Russell, 4th Duke of Bedford.

== Geography ==
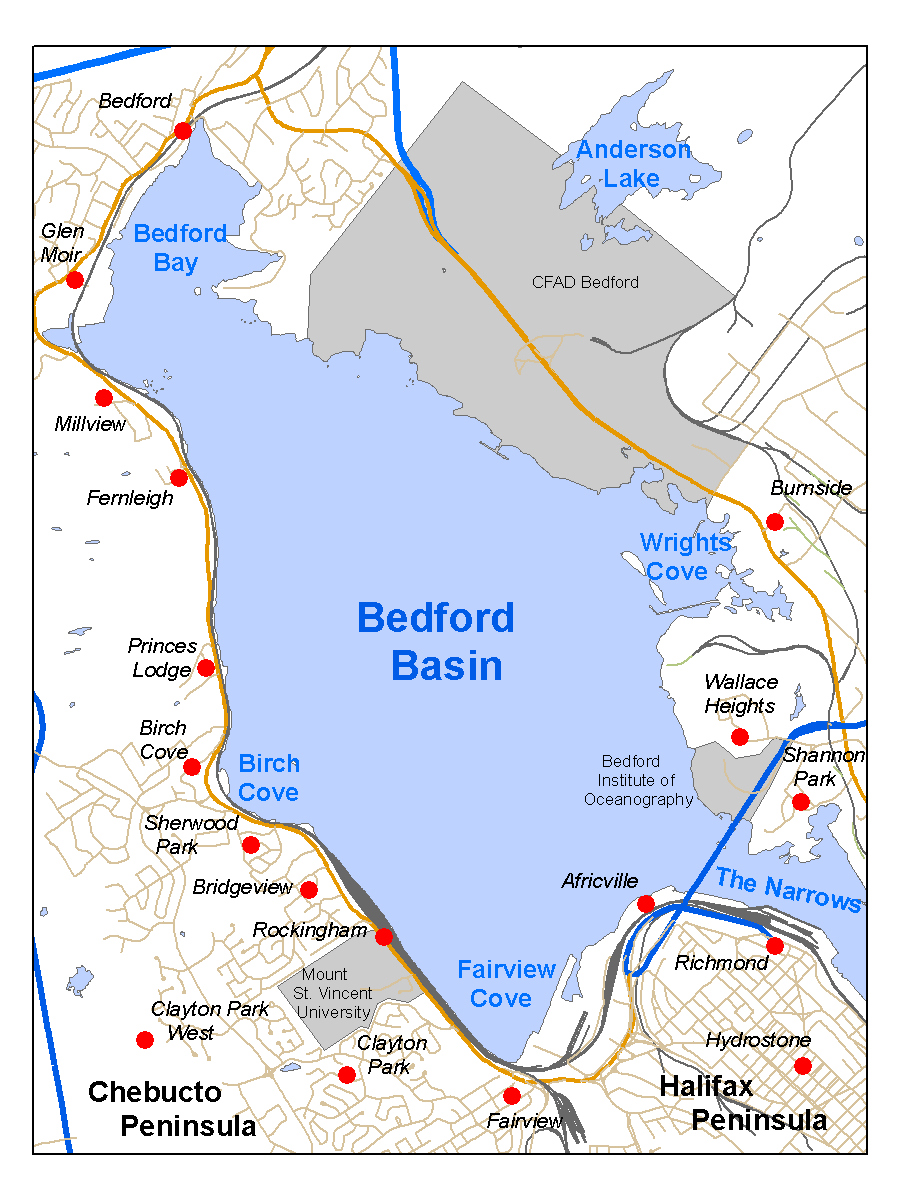
Map highlighting key points around the Bedford Basin.

Geographically, the basin is situated entirely within the Halifax Regional Municipality (HRM) and is oriented northwest–southeast, measuring approximately 8 kilometres (5 mi) long and 5 kilometres (3 mi) wide, surrounded by low hills measuring up to 160 metres (520 ft) in elevation, although most elevations range up to 30–60 metres (100–200 ft). The basin is fed by water from the Sackville River and has a maximum depth of 71 metres (233 ft); The basin's geologic history can be traced to the Wisconsin Glaciation when it, along with "The Narrows", formed part of the pre-historic Sackville River valley.

The basin contains the following sub-basins:

- Bedford Bay, in the extreme northwest.
- Birch Cove, on the western shore.
- Fairview Cove, in the extreme southwest.
- Wrights Cove, on the eastern shore.

Bedford on the northwestern corner takes its name from the basin, while Dartmouth sits on its eastern shore and Rockingham occupies the majority of the western shore. Africville Park is situated on the southern shore near the entrance into The Narrows.

=== Shoreline development ===
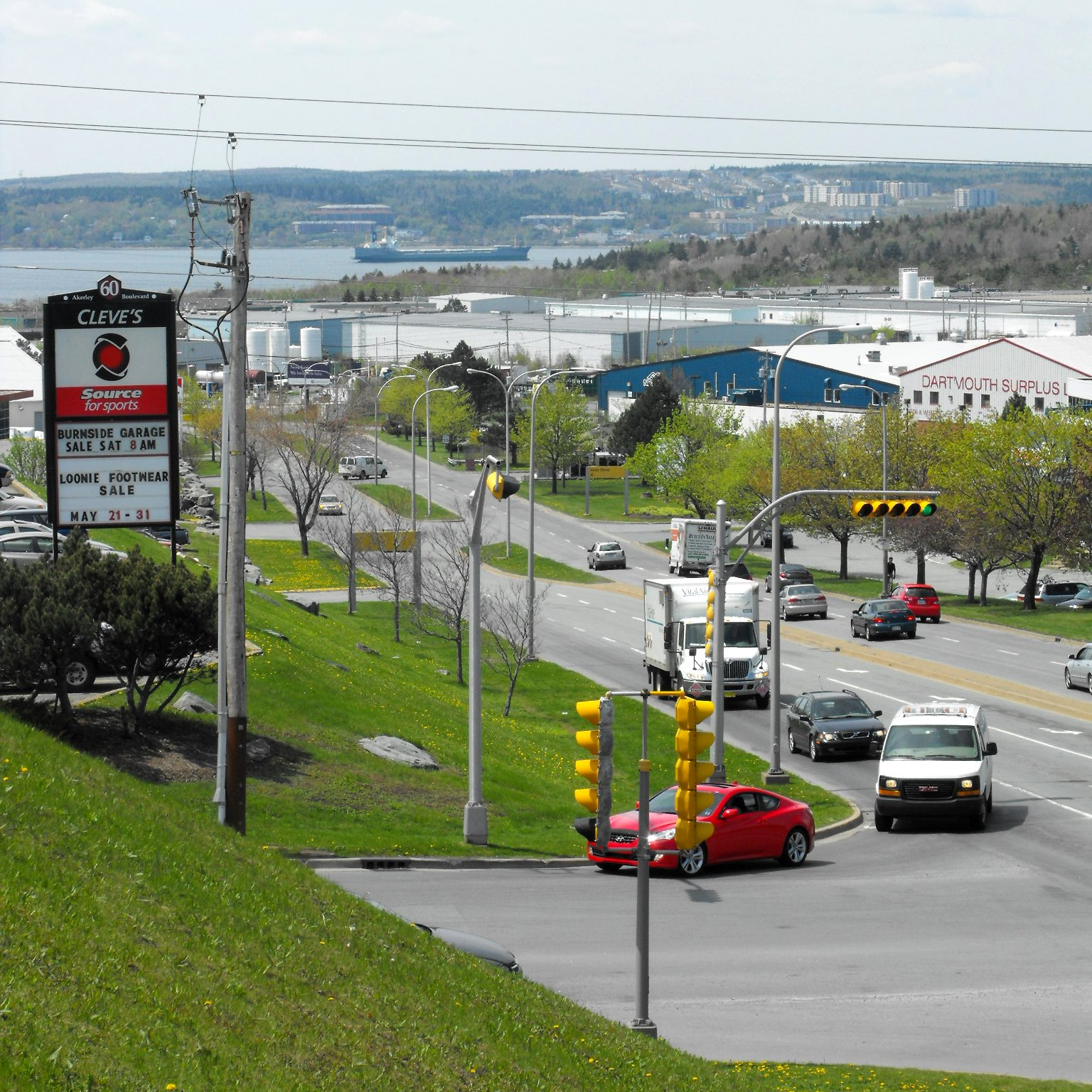
The east shore of the basin is home to Burnside Industrial Park. Bedford Bay may be seen in the background.

The lands surrounding the basin are heavily developed with the only significant greenspace remaining being along the northeastern shore of the basin where a significant blast buffer zone surrounds Canadian Forces Ammunition Depot Bedford (CFAD Bedford); this is the Royal Canadian Navy's weapons depot for its Atlantic fleet, known as Maritime Forces Atlantic (MARLANT).

The south shore of the basin at Fairview Cove hosts one of Halifax's two container terminals as well as the railway yard, Pace Yard, operated by Canadian National Railway (CN). The east shore of the basin hosts Burnside Industrial Park, the largest industrial park in HRM, as well as a bulk gypsum terminal at Wrights Cove and the Bedford Institute of Oceanography (which also derives its name from the basin) situated near the entrance to The Narrows. The vast majority of the western shore to the head of the basin is fronted by rail lines, behind which are a mix of residential/commercial and institutional developments.

== History ==
Though inhabited by the Mi'kmaq and the French having known of the site since the 17th century, the basin was named for John Russell, 4th Duke of Bedford, who was the British Secretary of State for the Colonies when Halifax was founded in 1749. The North American station of the Royal Navy was based just outside the entrance of the basin from 1759 to 1905, at the Royal Naval Dockyards. The naval base served as the station's headquarters until 1818, when it became the summer headquarters of the station. Defences were built around the approach towards the basin's entrance, with the construction of the York Redoubt at Ferguson's Cove, as well as fortifications on Georges Island, and McNabs Island. These defences were a part of the Halifax Defence Complex. In 1907, the Royal Naval Dockyards was transferred to the Government of Canada, and continues to operate as CFB Halifax.

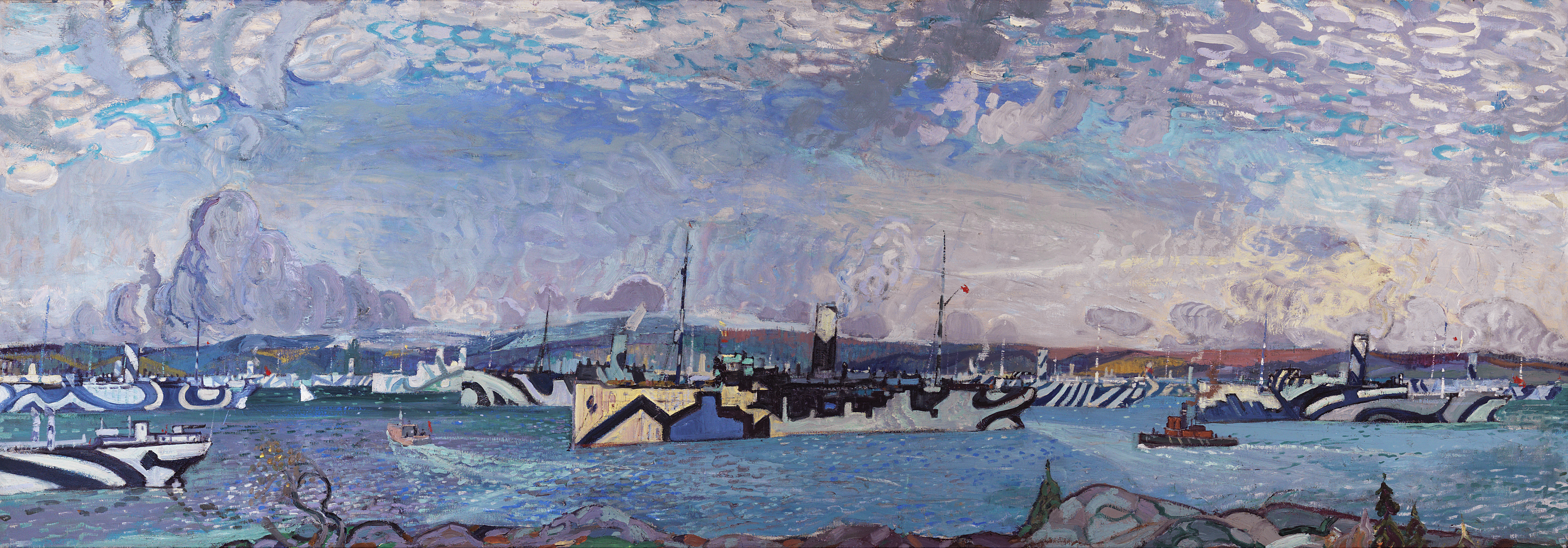
A depiction of an Allied convoy in Bedford Basin during the Second World War. Dazzle camouflage was used prominently during the war in an effort to mislead enemies on a ship's course of direction, distance, and speed.

The basin played a key role during the First and Second World Wars when commercial shipping was being attacked by enemy submarines. Given the size of the Port of Halifax, and its vicinity to Europe in contrast to other North American ports, the basin was used as an assembly point for transatlantic convoys bound for Europe. With defences built just outside of the only access point into the basin (a strait called The Narrows), it provided a safe place to assemble convoys consisting of hundreds of merchant ships and their escorts in relative security, while torpedo nets kept submarines at bay. In December 1917 the basin was the site of the Halifax Explosion, where two ships collided in the basin causing an explosion that levelled most of the surrounding area.

In 1994, the defences that protected Bedford Basin were designated a National Historic Site of Canada, commemorating the assembly of convoys in Bedford Basin during the Second World War. In 2010, on the 100th anniversary of the Royal Canadian Navy, a plaque was unveiled at Bedford Lake, Griesbach, Edmonton, Alberta, in recognition of the role played by Bedford Basin in the world wars.

"Bedford Basin is a large enclosed anchorage, forming the northwestern end of Halifax Harbour in Nova Scotia on Canada's Atlantic coast. The basin is quite deep and the good holding ground on the basin floor makes it an ideal anchorage and a protected location for ships.

The Basin came to international significance during both the First and Second World Wars when the German navy began to use submarines as an offensive weapon against Allied shipping. Canada's prominent role in the First World War led to Halifax being chosen as the primary logistic port for resupplying Western Europe. The protected waters of Bedford Basin allowed the Royal Navy and Royal Canadian Navy to assemble convoys consisting of hundreds of merchant ships in relative security while torpedo nets kept German submarines at bay. As observed By Rear Admiral Leonard W. Murray (RCN), Halifax saw first hand the tragic loss of life amongst merchant seamen. The Basin was a daily witness to the grim war at sea. Stricken vessels limped back to port and seamen told their stories of battle and the hazards of the North Atlantic convoy routes.

Today, CFB Halifax is located on the channel at the entrance to Bedford Basin and is the home of Canada's Atlantic fleet."- Bedford Basin Memorial in Alberta
