= Barrington River =

Barrington River may refer to:

- Barrington River (New South Wales), Australia
- Barrington River (Nova Scotia), Canada
- Barrington River (Rhode Island), U.S.
