= Webber Lake (Sackville) =

Lake of Nova Scotia

- Location within Nova Scotia
- Location: Halifax Regional Municipality, Nova Scotia
- Coordinates: 44.7752°N 63.7264°W
- Basin countries: Canada
- Surface elevation: 80 m (260 ft)

Webber Lake is a lake of Halifax Regional Municipality, Nova Scotia, Canada. It is situated between Middle Sackville and Lucasville, just south of Nova Scotia Highway 101.

== See also ==
- List of lakes in Nova Scotia
