= Halfway River (River Hebert tributary) =

Location
- Country: Canada
- Province: Nova Scotia

Physical characteristics
- Mouth
  - location: River Hebert
  - coordinates: 45.507765°N 64.337871°W

The Halfway River is a tributary of the River Hebert in Nova Scotia, Canada.

The village of Halfway River is near the mouth of the river.
