= Battle at St. Croix =

1750 battle during Father Le Loutre's War

- Part of Father Le Loutre's War
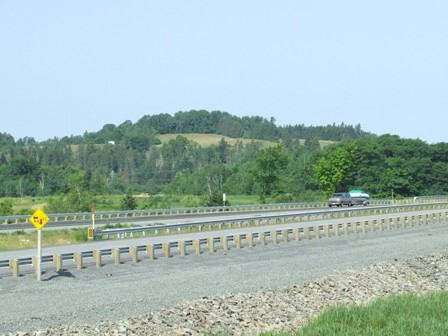
- "Battle Hill", St. Croix, Nova Scotia
Date	March 20–23, 1750
Location	St. Croix, Nova Scotia 44°57′42.9″N 64°2′1.6″W
Result	British victory

Belligerents
Miꞌkmaq militia, Maliseet ("St. John Indians"), Acadians ("rebel inhabitants")	British America

Commanders and leaders
Unknown	John Gorham (wounded); Captain William Clapham; Captain George St. Loe

Strength
Unknown	Unknown

Casualties and losses
1 killed	Three wounded, including Gorham

The Battle at St. Croix was fought during Father Le Loutre's War between Gorham's Rangers and Mi'kmaq at Battle Hill in the community of St. Croix, Nova Scotia. The battle lasted from March 20–23, 1750.

== Historical context ==
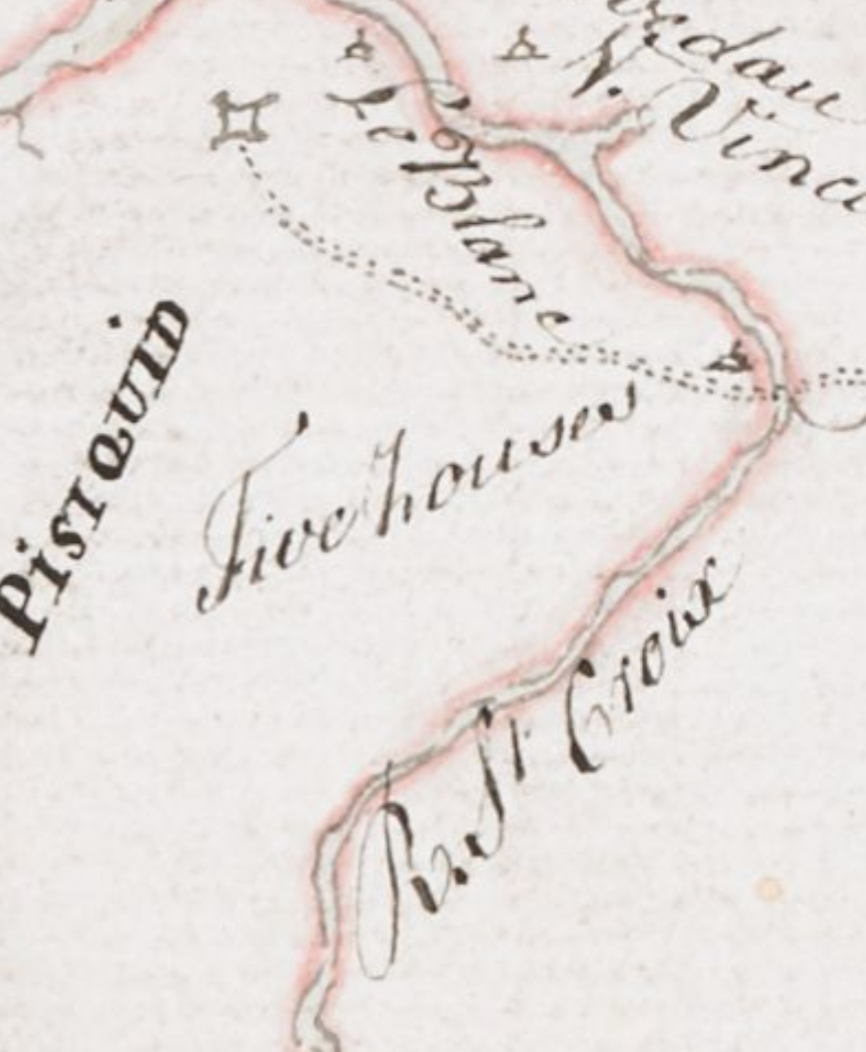
Five Houses, site of the battle (inset of map by John Brewse)

Despite the British Conquest of Acadia in 1710, Nova Scotia remained primarily occupied by Catholic Acadians and Mi'kmaq. By the time Edward Cornwallis had arrived in Halifax, there was a long history of the Wabanaki Confederacy (which included the Mi'kmaq) resisting British colonization along the New England–Acadia border in Maine by attacking colonial settlements (See the Northeast Coast Campaigns 1688, 1703, 1723, 1724, 1745, 1746, 1747).

To prevent the establishment of Protestant settlements in the region, the Mi'kmaq raided the early British settlements of present-day Shelburne (1715) and Canso (1720). A generation later, Father Le Loutre's War began when Edward Cornwallis arrived to establish Halifax with 13 transports on June 21, 1749.

Within 18 months of establishing Halifax, the British also took firm control of the Nova Scotia peninsula by building fortifications in all the major Acadian communities: present-day Windsor (Fort Edward), Grand Pre (Fort Vieux Logis) and Chignecto (Fort Lawrence). (A British fort already existed at the other major Acadian center of Annapolis Royal, Nova Scotia. Cobequid remained without a fort.) Nevertheless, there were still numerous Mi'kmaq and Acadian raids on these fortifications.

On September 30, 1749, prior to the battle, about forty Mi'kmaq attacked six men who were cutting trees at a saw mill in Dartmouth, Nova Scotia. Four of them were killed on the spot, one was taken prisoner and one escaped. Two of the men were scalped, and the heads of the others were cut off. A detachment of rangers was sent after the raiding party and cut off the heads of two Mi'kmaq and scalped one.

On October 2, 1749, in response to the raid in Dartmouth, Cornwallis created an extirpation proclamation. The Siege of Grand Pre was the first recorded conflict after the proclamation of Cornwallis' bounty. In early March 1750, the Acadians and Mi'kmaq took three English prisoners. Gorham was ordered to Fort Edward. The Battle at St. Croix occurred when New England Rangers were en route to Grand Pre to arrest the Acadians who had supported the siege and the taking of the three prisoners.

== Battle ==
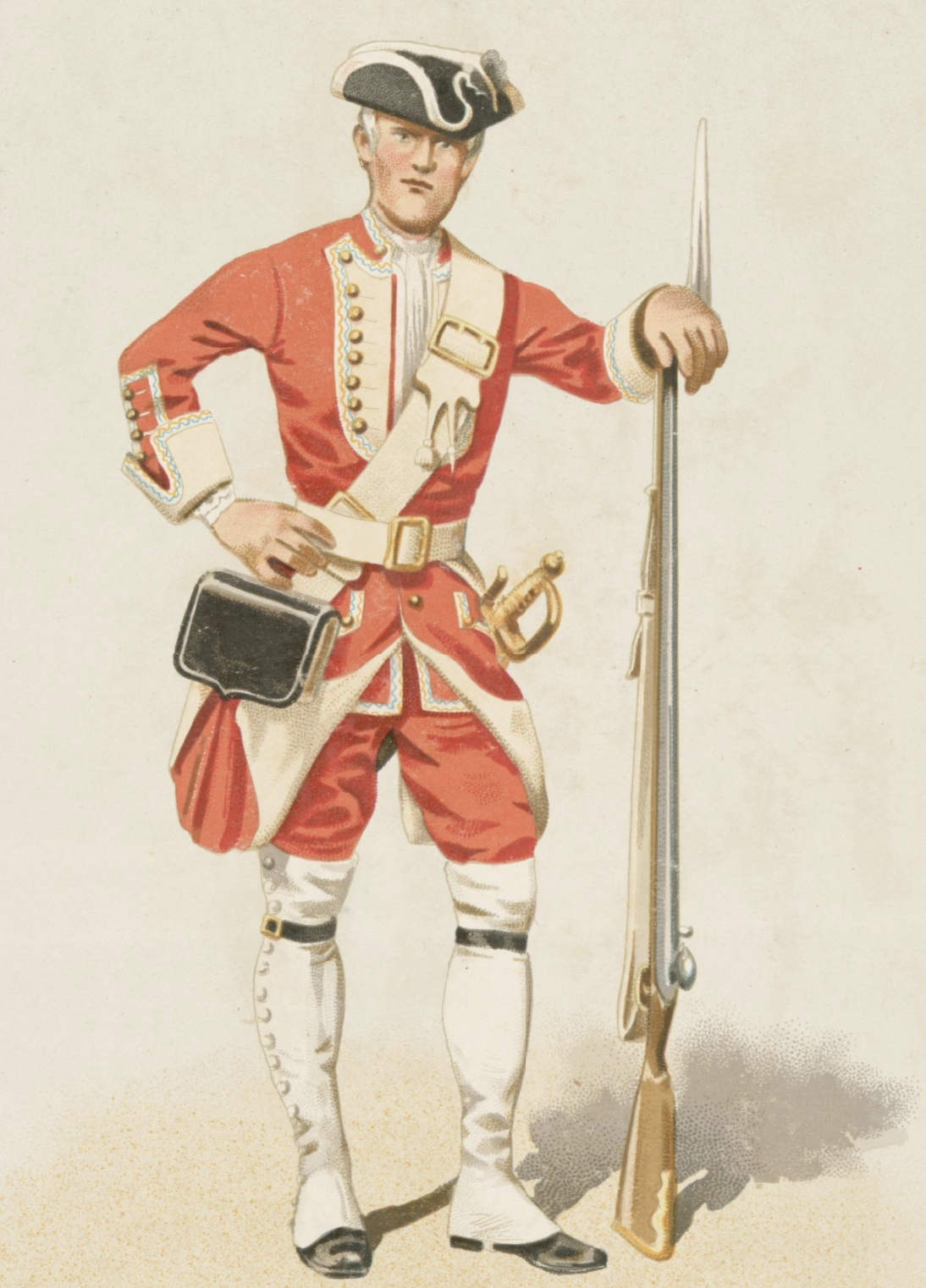
Private, 40th Regiment of Foot, 1742

On December 17, upon recently building a road from Halifax to Grand Pre, Cornwallis ordered Gorham to clear the road of natives who might hinder communications. On March 18, 1750, according to British accounts of the battle, a group of Rangers under the command of John Gorham (military officer) left Fort Sackville (now Bedford, Nova Scotia), under orders from Cornwallis to march to Pisiguit (in present-day Windsor). Their mission was to establish a blockhouse at Pisiguit (i.e., Fort Edward), and to seize the property of Acadians who had participated in the Siege of Grand Pre.

Arriving at about noon on March 20 at the Acadian village of Five Houses beside the St. Croix River, Gorham and his men found all the houses deserted. Seeing a group of Mi'kmaq hiding in the bushes on the opposite shore, the Rangers opened fire. The skirmish deteriorated into a siege, with Gorham's men taking refuge in a sawmill and two of the houses. During the fighting around "Battle Hill", the Rangers suffered three wounded including Gorham, who sustained a bullet in the thigh. As the fighting intensified, a request was sent back to Fort Sackville for reinforcements.

On March 22, responding to the call for assistance, Cornwallis ordered Captain William Clapham's Rangers and Captain George St. Loe of the 40th Regiment of Foot, equipped with two field guns, to join Gorham at Pisiguit. The additional troops and artillery turned the tide for Gorham and forced the Mi'kmaq to withdraw.

== Aftermath ==
After the siege, Gorham and the additional troops continued on to Pisiguit. Arriving there, Gorham established himself at the Parish Church of L'Assomption (in present-day Fort Edward) and proceeded to scour the surrounding countryside in a search-and-destroy mission against the Mi'kmaq. Richard Bulkeley wrote that between 1749 and 1755, Nova Scotia "was kept in an uninterrupted state of war by the Acadians... and the reports of an officer commanding Fort Edward (Nova Scotia), [indicated he] could not be conveyed [to Halifax] with less an escort than an officer and thirty men."

In March 1750, the Mi'kmaq and Acadian militias killed Cornwallis' messenger who was en route from Halifax to Chignecto. As a result, Cornwallis stopped sending small parties out of Halifax.

== Literature cited ==
- Faragher, John Mack (2005). A Great and Noble Scheme: The Tragic Story of the Expulsion of the French Acadians from Their American Homeland. W.W Norton & Company. ISBN 978-0-393-05135-3.
- Grenier, John (2008). The Far Reaches of Empire: War in Nova Scotia, 1710-1760. University of Oklahoma Press. ISBN 978-0-8061-3876-3.
- Griffiths, N.E.S. (2005). From Migrant to Acadian: A North American Border People, 1604-1755. McGill-Queen's University Press. ISBN 978-0-7735-2699-0.
- Landry, Peter. The Lion & The Lily. Vol. 1. Victoria: Trafford, 2007.
- Murdoch, Beamish (1866). A History of Nova-Scotia, Or Acadie. Vol. II. Halifax: J. Barnes.
- Rompkey, Ronald, ed. Expeditions of Honour: The Journal of John Salusbury in Halifax, Nova Scotia, 1749–53. Newark: U of Delaware P, Newark, 1982.
