= John Lusby Marsh National Wildlife Area =

National Wildlife Area in Nova Scotia

Coordinates: 45°48′55″N 64°15′50″W

- Interactive map of John Lusby Marsh National Wildlife Area
- Location: Nova Scotia
- Nearest city: Amherst, Nova Scotia
- Area: 552 hectares (1,360 acres)
- Established: 1978

John Lusby Marsh National Wildlife Area is a 552 hectares (1,360 acres) National Wildlife Area located in Cumberland County, Nova Scotia, Canada, adjacent to Amherst, Chignecto National Wildlife Area, and Amherst Point Migratory Bird Sanctuary. The wildlife area is protected and managed in accordance with the Wildlife Area Regulations. It was established in 1978.

The wildlife area contains a large salt marsh named John Lusby Marsh, the largest continuous section of wetlands in the Bay of Fundy ecosystem.

It protects a variety of birds, including Canada goose, willet, and American wigeon.

Some activities are permitted, such as wildlife observation, hiking, and photography. Waterfowl hunting is also permitted, subject to federal and provincial regulations.

== Geography ==
John Lusby Marsh National Wildlife Area comprises approximately 552 hectares (1,360 acres) in area. The wildlife area contains a large salt marsh named John Lusby Marsh, which is largest continuous section of wetlands remaining in the Bay of Fundy ecosystem.

== Birds ==
John Lusby Marsh National Wildlife Area is important for birds during migration. The wildlife area protects American black duck, green-winged teal, American wigeon, northern pintail, greater yellowlegs, lesser yellowlegs, short-billed dowitcher, Canada goose, and willet.

== Activities ==
Activities such as wildlife observation, hiking, and photography are permitted. Waterfowl hunting is also permitted, subject to federal and provincial regulations.

== Access ==
John Lusby Marsh National Wildlife Area can be accessed via Nova Scotia Highway 104 and Nova Scotia Trunk 6, as well as minor forest trails.

== See also ==
- List of protected areas of Nova Scotia
