= Lucasville, Nova Scotia =

Coordinates: 44°46′8.3″N 63°43′7″W

Lucasville in Nova Scotia

Lucasville is a Black Nova Scotian settlement within the Halifax Regional Municipality in the Canadian province of Nova Scotia. The community is home to Atlantic Splash Adventure, a popular local water park.

== Geography ==
Lucasville is located within the Halifax Regional Municipality near Bedford and Lower Sackville. Lucasville borders Webber Lake and McCabe Lake. The Lucasville Road goes through the community, splitting into the Cranley Road and Waterstone Run.

== History ==
The community was established by James Lucas and Moses Oliver in 1827, then known as Lucas Settlement. The founders were Black Refugees from the United States who first settled the area after the War of 1812.

In 1970, Lucasville had a Black population of 200.

=== Present day ===
Throughout the years, residents have raised safety concerns regarding the Lucasville Road. No sidewalks or transit access along the prolific road have been implemented for residents, and some residents emphasise it as an issue for children's safety. The Lucasville Greenway Society, a local organisation, requested that the Halifax Regional Municipality construct a greenway project. The project was aimed at connecting Lucasville to surrounding communities and to act as a multi-use transportation pathway and walking space for pedestrians.

== Atlantic Splash Adventure ==
A view of the water park in July 2019

Formerly known as Atlantic Playland, Atlantic Splash Adventure is a water park located in Lucasville. Transformed into a water park in 1981, it has become a popular local attraction. Described as "Halifax’s only water park," six additional slides were built in it in June 2019, totaling eight slides.

== Notable residents ==
- Eli Goree — Actor

== See also ==
- Black Nova Scotians
