= Avon River (Nova Scotia) =

Coordinates: 44°59′21.35″N 64°9′7.29″W

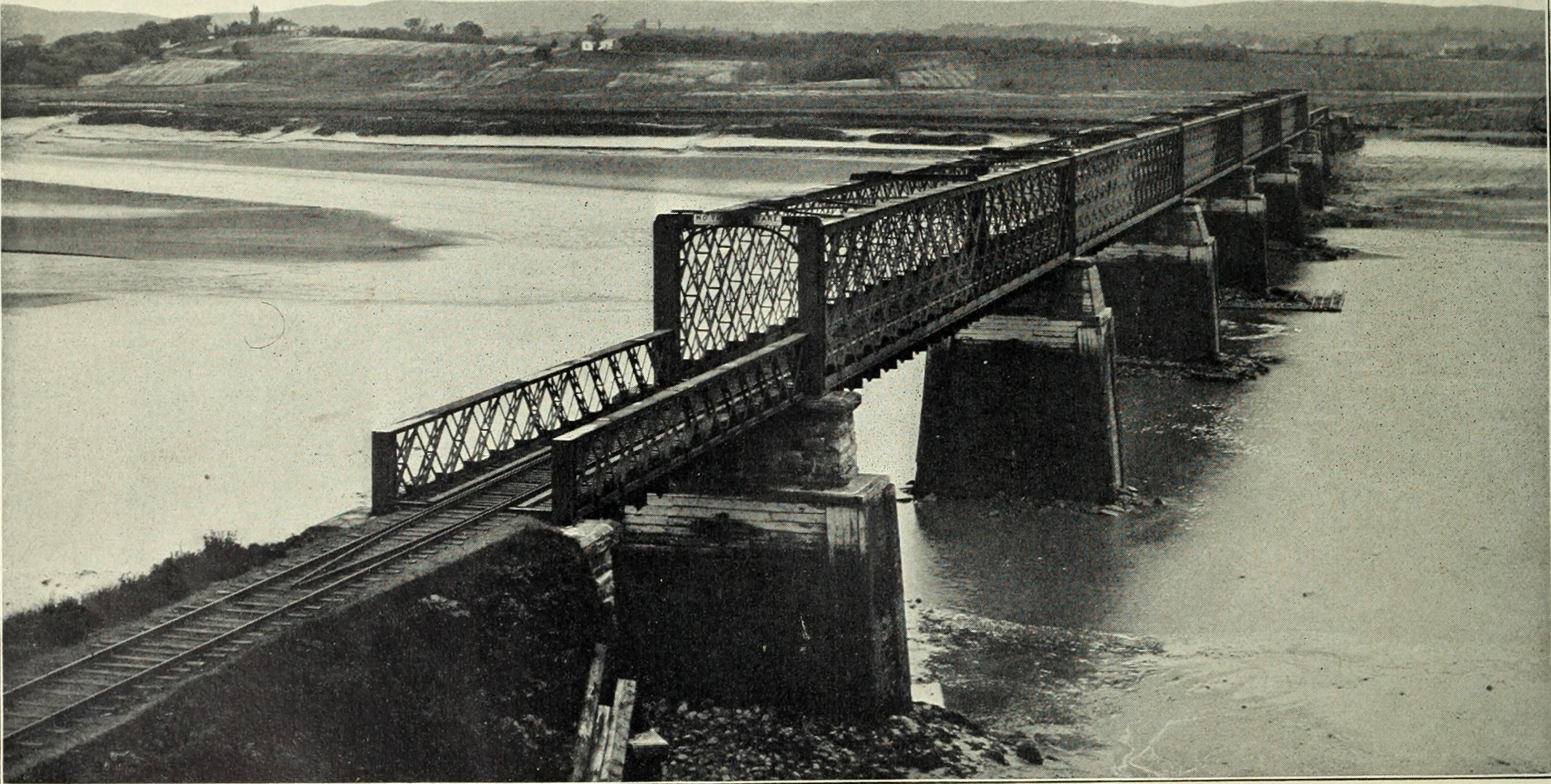
- 19th-century photograph of the Dominion Atlantic Railway bridge at Windsor

Location
- Country: Canada
- Province: Nova Scotia

Physical characteristics
- Mouth
  - location: Minas Basin
  - elevation: sea level
- Length: 64 km (40 mi)
- Basin size: 1,306 km^{2} (504 sq mi)

The Avon River is a small river in central Nova Scotia, Canada.

A northerly flowing river, the Avon River's flow rises at an elevation of 145 metres (475 ft.) at Card and Bag Lakes on the South Mountain, a distance of approximately 29 kilometres (18 miles) southwest of the town of Windsor. Its meander length is 64 km (40 mi). At Windsor Forks, the West Branch Avon River (the main tributary) and the Southwest Branch Avon add their flow to the Avon. The West Branch Avon River rises at an elevation of 175 metres (574 ft.) at Black River Lake. Both the flows of the Avon and the West Branch have been impeded by hydropower developments in the early twentieth century. Near the rural community of Martock, the river enters a broad glacial river valley forming a ria where it becomes tidal, creating an estuary for its remaining route to the Minas Basin at Kempt Shore, several kilometres downriver from the town of Hantsport. Another tributary, the St. Croix River joins just below Windsor creating a total watershed of 1,306 square kilometres.

Rivers flowing into the Avon include the Halfway, Herbert, Cogmagun, Kennetcook and St. Croix.

The Avon River is evident on many very early maps of the region and by 1686 is shown, along with its drainage basin, on Jean-Baptiste-Louis Franquelin's map in great detail.

== Causeway and controversy ==
In 1970 the mouth of the Avon River was crossed by a rock and earth fill causeway immediately downstream from Windsor at its junction with the St. Croix River as part of the development of a controlled access expressway called Highway 101.

The Avon River Causeway replaced an existing road bridge upriver from town and also resulted in the rerouting of the Dominion Atlantic Railway's Halifax-Yarmouth main line which used to run through Windsor's downtown, crossing the river on a bridge parallel to the road bridge immediately upriver from the town.

Flood control gates in the causeway control the Avon River's discharge and the incoming tidal waters in order to regulate the river's flowage to prevent flooding in Windsor. The section of the Avon River upriver of the causeway along the Windsor waterfront then became the 'man-made', freshwater, Lake Pesaquid.

A decision in August 2007 by the New Brunswick government to remove a similar causeway (constructed in 1968) blocking the Petitcodiac River, another tributary of the Bay of Fundy, to avoid facing charges under the federal Fisheries Act, was expected to have ramifications for the Avon River causeway.

=== Environmental impacts ===
The flood control has had the negative impact of blocking fish movement and causing siltation upstream. The fish affected are the Atlantic salmon, listed as endangered under the Canadian Species at Risk Act, and the American eel is threatened.

Downstream, the construction of the causeway dramatically affected the Avon River, with large parts of the once-navigable river now being obstructed by large mud flats and vegetation, owing to the lack of tidal exchange and freshwater discharge. The nature writer Harry Thurston has noted, "Almost before the last stone was put in place, sediment began to accumulate to an alarming rate - 5 to 14 centimetres per month. Within seven years, a four metre high island of silt formed on the seaward side of the causeway; and the effects were felt 20 kilometres downstream, where two metres of mud impaired navigation at Hantsport."

Dr. Michael Risk of the University of Guelph, researching the build-up of a new mud flat on the seaward side of the causeway, "estimated that the bottom-dwelling creatures at Windsor were experiencing a two-thirds mortality rate", which led him to state the new formation was a "biological desert". The onset of the mud flat formation left the sediments in an initial state which were too soft to support organisms. The need to monitor and assess the impacts of such changes gave impetus to a greater interest in Bay of Fundy ecosystem and the ultimate establishment of the Acadia Centre for Estuarine Research (ACER) in Wolfville. Contrasting the initial decline of bottom-dwelling creatures, Dr. Graham Daborn of ACER found that zoo-plankton "are more abundant than previously thought. They appear to be able to thrive on non-living organic matter..." and that this "abundance of creatures at the lower end of the food chain suggests a considerable nursery role for the inner Bay." This notion is supported by research work completed by Dr. Sherman Bleakney of Acadia University.

=== Highway improvements and water control plans ===
In 2016 plans were announced to twin Highway 101 from Three Mile Plains to Falmouth, crossing the Avon on an overpass with completion planned to be complete by 2023. A replacement for the aboiteau acceptable to all parties proved difficult to achieve but in December 2025 a design was submitted to Fisheries and Oceans Canada that Nova Scotia Public Works believed would be acceptable and permit completion of the highway.

In March 2021 the federal fisheries minister ordered the Nova Scotia Department of Agriculture to operate the tidal gates at the Avon River in a manner that improves fish passage. Fishermen and Indigenous groups reacted positively, but the resulting lower water level in Lake Pisiquid was a nuisance to others. Pisiquid Canoe Club feared they would have to suspend operations, and the increased salinity made the water unsuitable for agricultural irrigation.

In summer 2023, during record-breaking wildfires, the government of Nova Scotia ordered the closing of an aboiteau at the Windsor causeway "to maximize the water supply available in the event of wildfires". The aboiteau's opening in March 2021 had caused nearby Lake Pisiquid to drain.

== See also ==
- List of rivers of Nova Scotia
