= Cumberland Basin (Canada) =

Bay bordering Nova Scotia and New Brunswick

Coordinates: 45°48′N 64°23′W

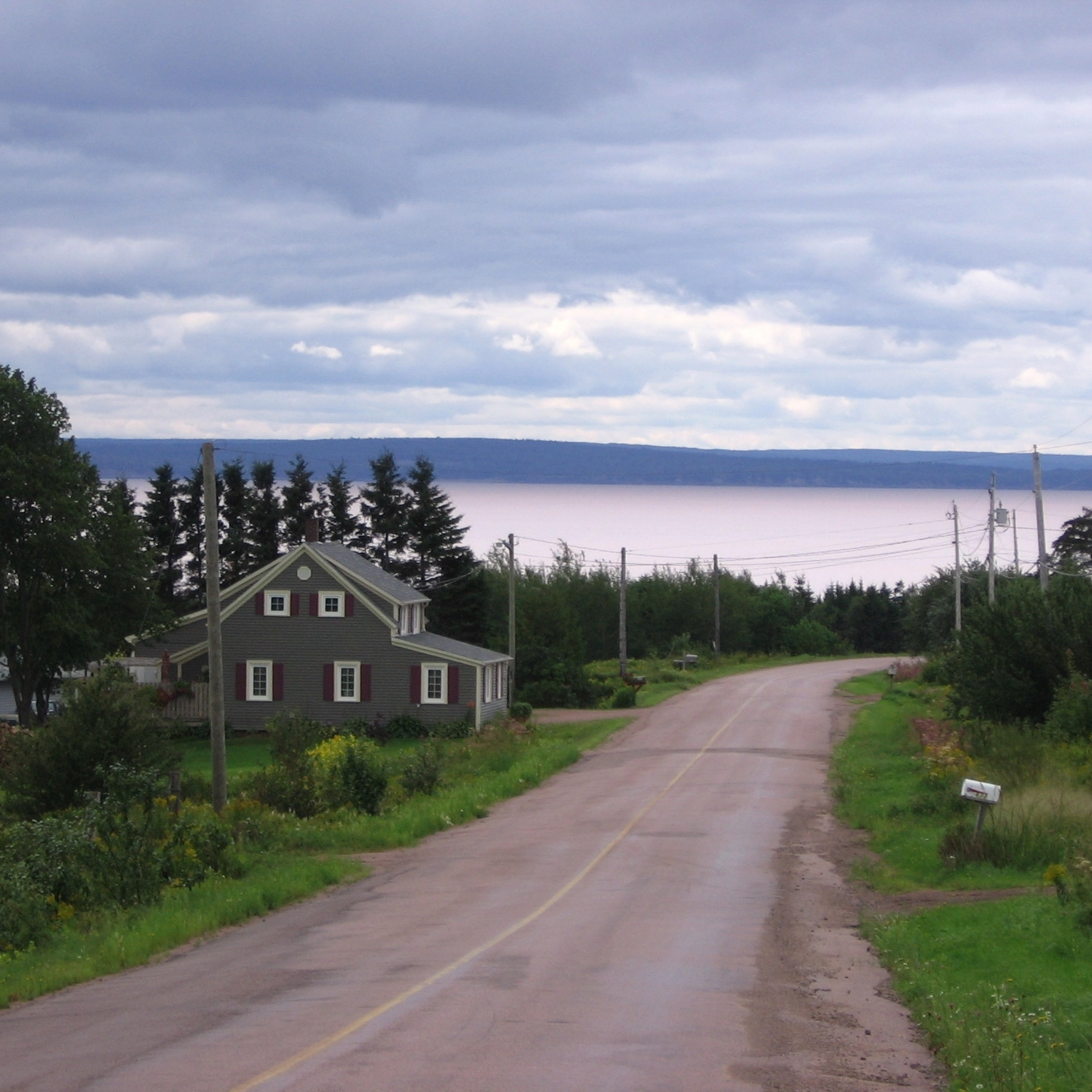
Cumberland Basin

Cumberland Basin is an inlet and northeasternmost part of the Bay of Fundy, located on the border between the Canadian provinces of Nova Scotia and New Brunswick. It is the eastern branch of Chignecto Bay, which in turn is the western arm of the upper Bay of Fundy.

In geology, the Cumberland Basin is a sedimentary basin which underlies most of Cumberland County, Nova Scotia, west of Chignecto Bay and north of the Cobequid Mountains. It is a one of eleven sub-basins of the Maritimes Basin. The geological Cumberland Basin is west of, and extends beneath, the maritime Cumberland Basin.

Along the Nova Scotia shore of the lower Cumberland Basin at Joggins are seaside cliffs known for fossil formations. Several coal seams are also exposed. These were mined commercially for Bituminous coal for nearly 140 years (1819–1958). The upper Cumberland loops clockwise, north of a flatland called Elysian Fields and southeast to Amherst Point and the mouth of the Maccan River.

Across the basin from the mouth of the Maccan River, the mud and sand flats and salt marshes exposed at low tide attract millions of shorebirds during fall migration. A small portion of the Upper Cumberland Basin has been protected as Chignecto National Wildlife Area. The upper basin has been listed as a Ramsar site and also designated a Hemispheric Shorebird Reserve, the highest classification of the Western Hemisphere Shorebird Reserve Network.

The fishery in Cumberland Basin is mainly limited to shad and lobster.

== See also ==
- Royal eponyms in Canada
