= Millwood High School (Nova Scotia) =

Public high school in Middle Sackville, Nova Scotia

Location
- 141 Millwood Drive; Middle Sackville, Nova Scotia, B4E 0A1; Canada; 44°47′25.8″N 63°42′29.7″W

Information
- School type: Public High school
- Founded: 1986 (split shifts); building opened 1989
- School board: Halifax Regional Centre for Education
- Principal: Stephen Corkum
- Grades: 9–12
- Enrollment: 897 (2023–24)
- Language: English; French immersion
- Colours: Navy, red and silver
- Mascot: Knight
- Team name: Knights
- Website: mlh.hrce.ca

Millwood High School is a public high school in Middle Sackville, Nova Scotia, Canada. It is part of the Halifax Regional Centre for Education (HRCE) and serves grades 9–12 within the Millwood Family of Schools, which includes Harry R. Hamilton Elementary, Millwood Elementary, Sackville Heights Elementary and Sackville Heights Junior High.

== History ==
Plans for a second High School to relieve crowding in the Sackville area led to the creation of Millwood High School in 1986 , initially operating on split shifts at nearby Sackville High while Millwood's facility was constructed . The school moved into its own building in 1989 . By 2025, HRCE's Long-Range Outlook and SchoolsPlus documentation continued to reference the " Millwood Family of Schools , " reflecting ongoing community planning around enrollment and programming . In the year 2011 Millwood High won soccer provincials with Jarett Conway as the Captain . A banner was placed within the Gymnasium at Millwood High .

== Campus ==
The school is located at 141 Millwood Drive in Middle Sackville, on a suburban campus that includes a gymnasium and outdoor fields used by school teams and community sport associations.

== Academics ==
Millwood offers the provincial English program alongside French Immersion pathways (e.g., Science 10 (F), Histoire planétaire 12F) and co-op learning options, as set out in the school's annual course selection guide. Advanced Placement (AP) opportunities are available within HRCE, and Millwood has offered AP English Literature at the Grade 12 level in recent years.

== Arts ==
Millwood maintains active arts programming and participates in HRCE's Halifax Regional Arts initiatives supporting fine arts across families of schools. The school stages annual musical theatre productions; for example, in 2026 Millwood presented Mean Girls with student casts and crews.

== Athletics ==
Millwood's teams compete as the Knights in a wide range of Nova Scotia School Athletic Federation sports, including badminton, baseball, basketball, cross country, curling, football, golf, hockey, rugby, soccer, softball, track and field, volleyball and wrestling. The school also fields boys' and girls' hockey teams that participate in the Metro High School Hockey League.

== Student life ==
Student Council activities and school events are regularly reported through School Advisory Council (SAC) minutes and school communications.

== Feeder schools ==
Millwood is the senior high for the Millwood Family of Schools, whose member schools are Harry R. Hamilton Elementary, Millwood Elementary, Sackville Heights Elementary and Sackville Heights Junior High.

== Enrolment ==
As of the 2023–24 school year, provincial data report a total enrolment of 897 students at Millwood High.

== See also ==
- Education in Nova Scotia
- Halifax Regional Centre for Education
