= Little Sackville River =

River in Halifax, Nova Scotia, Canada

Coordinates: 44°45′0″N 63°39′57″W

Little Sackville River is a river in Halifax Regional Municipality, Nova Scotia, Canada.

In July 2002, thousands of fish in the Little Sackville River were killed by a toxic spill. After an investigation by the Department of Environment and Labour and the Department of Fisheries and Oceans, many of the fish were deemed to have suffocated due to several metals, such as aluminum and iron, clogging the gills. Additionally, high levels of aluminum caused acute toxicity in the water. Aqueous aluminum is highly toxic to freshwater fishes and benthic macroinvertebrates. This was very likely another cause of the death of the fish.

== See also ==
- List of rivers of Nova Scotia
