= Barrington Head, Nova Scotia =

Barrington Head
- Locality
- Location of Barrington Head, Nova Scotia
- Coordinates: 43.568333°N 65.577222°W
- Country: Canada
- Province: Nova Scotia
- County: Shelburne
- Municipal district: Barrington
- Time zone: UTC-4 (AST)
  - Summer (DST): UTC-3 (ADT)
- Postal code(s): B0W 1E0
- Area code: 902
- Access Routes: Trunk 3

Barrington Head is a locality in the Canadian province of Nova Scotia, located in the Municipality of the District of Barrington of Shelburne County.

Originally a community, it was amalgamated with the community of Barrington in 2006.

It refers to a general geographic area consisting of the region to the east of the head of the Barrington River (which flows into Barrington Bay), Route 3, to approximately the Hibbard's Brook bridges, one near the Barrington Municipal Exhibition Grounds on Route 3, and one other being on Route 309, on the Villagedale Road. Barrington Head was once home to Swim's General Store, and contains the Kenney Shell Station, the United Church, Barrington Exhibition Grounds, 7E Volunteer Fire Department, and the Goodwill Club of Barrington.

Forest Ridge Academy (elementary school) is in the area, as well as the Dept. of Highways building.

== See also ==
- List of communities in Nova Scotia
