= Chignecto Bay =

Inlet of the Bay of Fundy in North America

Coordinates: 45°40′N 64°40′W

Designations

Ramsar Wetland
- Official name: Chignecto
- Designated: 16 October 1985
- Reference no.: 320

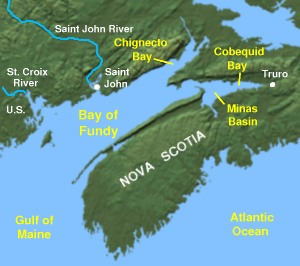
Chignecto Bay is the north-east arm of the Bay of Fundy.

Chignecto Bay (French: Baie de Chignectou) is an inlet of the Bay of Fundy located between the Canadian provinces of New Brunswick and Nova Scotia and separated from the waters of the Northumberland Strait by the Isthmus of Chignecto. It is a unit within the greater Gulf of Maine Watershed. Chignecto Bay forms the northeastern part of the Bay of Fundy which splits at Cape Chignecto and is delineated on the New Brunswick side by Martin Head. Chignecto Bay is a Ramsar site.

Chignecto bay was also the site of an unsuccessful railway and canal project of the 1880s and 1890s that would have intersected the landmass, thereby providing a transit passage between New England and Prince Edward Island. After several investigations into the feasibility of a new canal project, including most importantly by the Chignecto Canal Commission, the proposed Chignecto Canal was deemed commercially and economically unjustifiable and the project was abandoned. Some of the physical remnants of the 1880s project still continue to dot the landscape of Chignecto Bay today.

== Hydrography ==
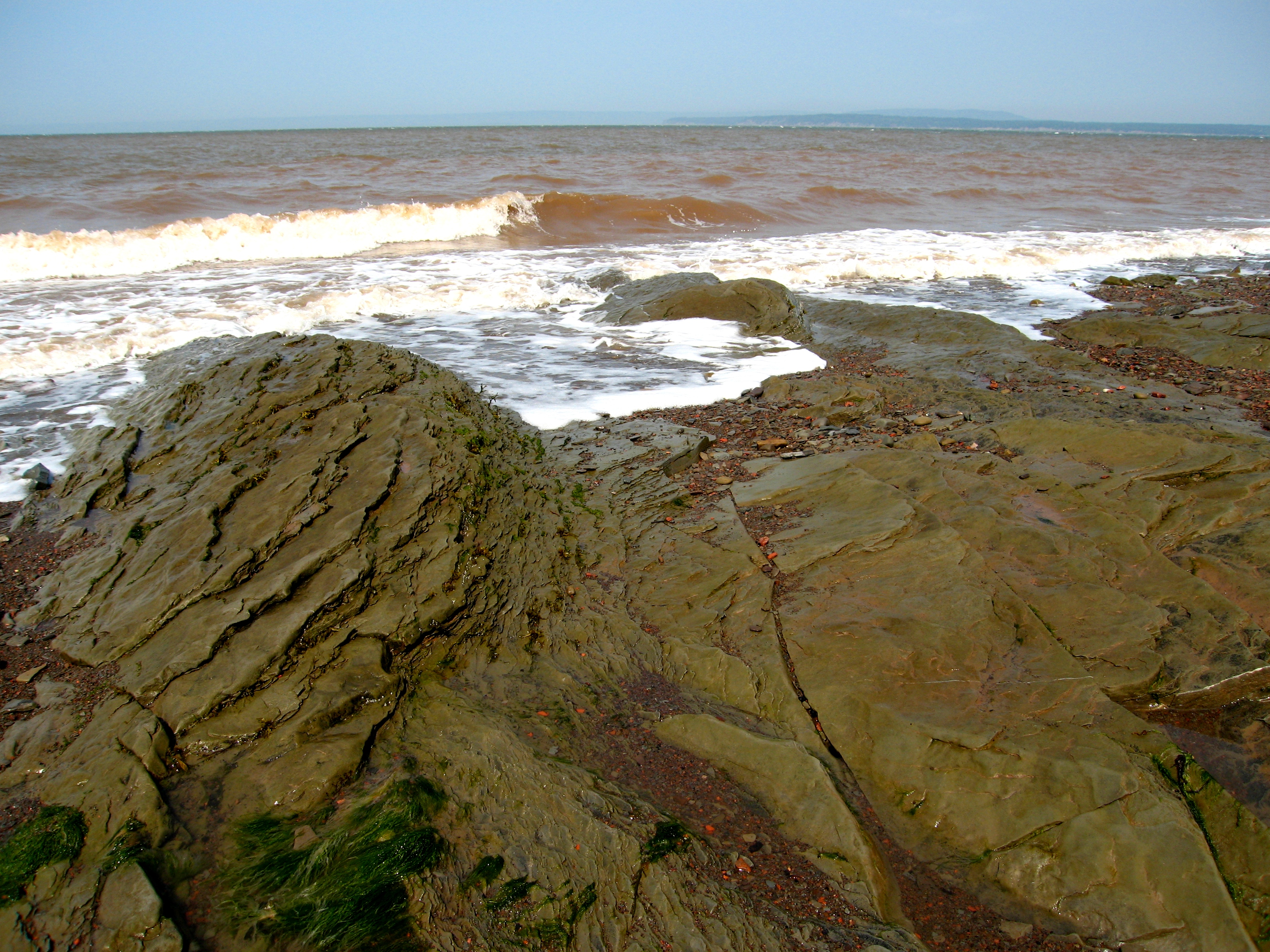
Chignecto Bay viewed from Joggins Fossil Cliffs. In the distance is Cape Maringouin with the coast of New Brunswick visible on the horizon.

At its head, Chignecto Bay itself subdivides into two basins, separated by Cape Maringouin:

- Cumberland Basin - the northeast arm of Chignecto Bay (and the Bay of Fundy) between the two provinces, terminating at the Tantramar Marshes and the estuaries of the Tantramar River and Maccan River.
- Shepody Bay - the north arm of Chignecto Bay and is wholly within New Brunswick. Its northern limit is formed at the estuaries of the Petitcodiac and Memramcook Rivers.

Many small named bays line the Bay's coast including Salisbury Bay at the mouths of the Upper Salmon River and Cleveland Brook, site of the Village of Alma, NB.

Chignecto Bay is a northern extension of a rift valley that forms much of the Bay of Fundy.

== Toponymy ==
Chignecto is derived from the Mi'kmaq language, but its exact etymology is unclear. It may be from Sigunikt 'foot cloth', possibly alluding to a Mi'kmaq legend. Or it may be from Siknikt, 'drainage place'; the latter (as Siknikt or Signigt, in longer form Sikniktewa'kik or Signigtewa'gi) is today the name of the Mi'kma'ki district in which the bay is located.

== Shorebird wildlife areas ==
The head of Cumberland Basin is an important migrating area for many shorebirds. A large portion of it is protected as a wildlife sanctuary known as the Chignecto National Wildlife Area. It includes the 10.2 km^{2} John Lusby National Wildlife Area, which is recognized as a Ramsar Wetland of International Importance since October 1985.
