= Joggins =

Community in Nova Scotia, Canada

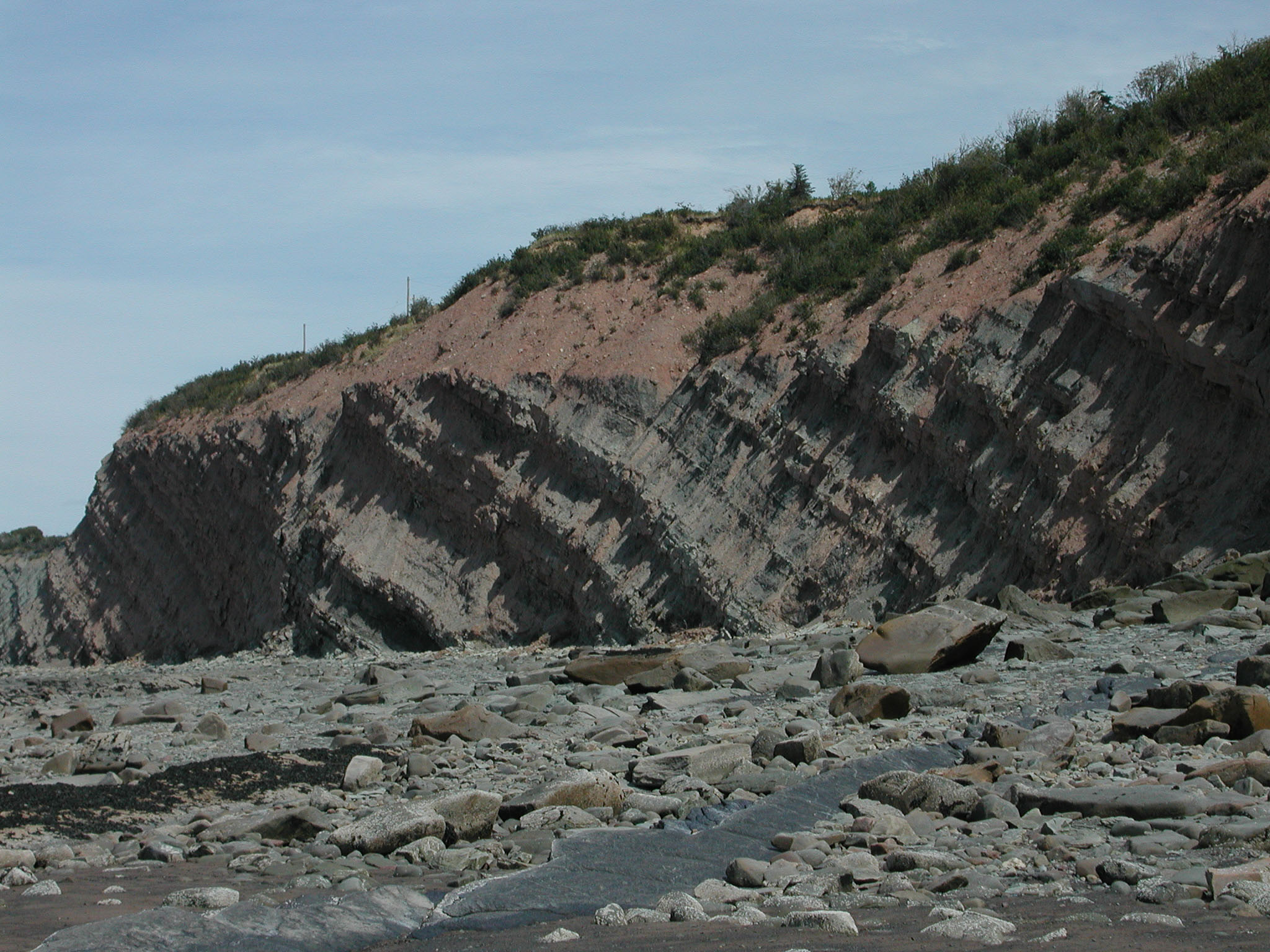
- View of the Joggins Fossil Cliffs

- Location within Nova Scotia
- Coordinates: 45°41′30.78″N 64°26′36.85″W
- Country: Canada
- Province: Nova Scotia
- Municipality: Cumberland County
- Incorporated: 1889
- Dissolved: 1949
- Time zone: UTC-4 (AST)

UNESCO World Heritage Site
- Official name: Joggins Fossil Cliffs
- Type: Natural
- Criteria: viii
- Designated: 2008 (32nd session)
- Reference no.: 1285
- Region: Europe and North America

Joggins is a rural community located in western Cumberland County, Nova Scotia, Canada. On July 7, 2008, a 15-km length of the coast constituting the Joggins Fossil Cliffs was officially inscribed on the World Heritage List.

== History ==
Historical populations
Year	Pop.	±%
1901	1,088	—
1911	1,648	+51.5%
1921	1,732	+5.1%
1931	1,000	−42.3%

The area was known to the Mi'kmaq as "Chegoggins" meaning place of the large fish weir, a name modified by French and English settlers to Joggins. Situated on the Cumberland Basin, a sub-basin of the Bay of Fundy, Joggins was a long established coal mining area. Its coal seams which are exposed along the shore of the Cumberland Basin were exploited as early as 1686 by local Acadian settlers and by the British garrison at Annapolis Royal in 1715.

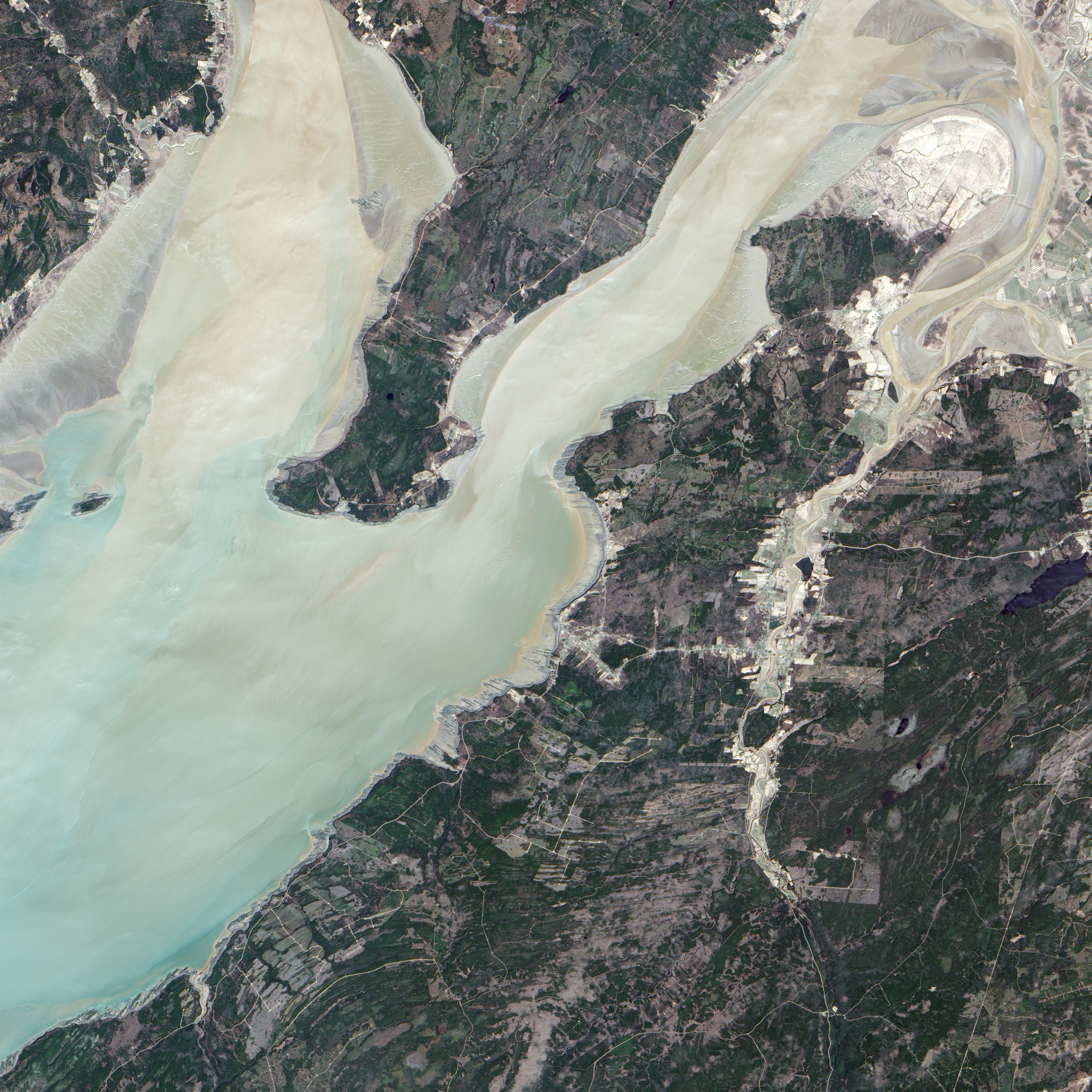
Satellite view of the upper Bay of Fundy region during low tide, showing Joggins Cliffs and community of Joggins at centre right.

The first commercial mine was set up by Major Henry Cope in 1731, but was destroyed by the Mi'kmaq in November 1732. In 1819 Samuel McCully opened a mine with much of his production being shipped by sea to Saint John, New Brunswick and other markets, but the mine went out of business in 1821 having mined less than 600 tons.

Large-scale industrialization came to Cumberland County under the General Mining Association, which held the rights to the area's coal fields. Commencing at Joggins in 1847, production increased after the construction of the Intercolonial Railway in the 1870s, followed by the 1887 opening of the Joggins Railway, a 12-mile rail line from mines at Joggins to the Intercolonial mainline at Maccan, through River Hebert.

Old coal mine working are eroding out of the sea-cliffs at Joggins. Recently dendrochronology had been employed to date the timber pit props. A late nineteenth century age has been inferred, with most props dating from the 1860s and 1870s.

The coal mines attracted a diverse number of workers, some as young as 12 years. French-speaking Acadians returned from New Brunswick, and were joined by Irish and Scottish immigrants. Joggins Mines expanded rapidly to include three churches, two cemeteries, a hotel, a roller ring, movie theatre, fire department, general store, post office, railway station and school. Coal mining grew in such importance that the community was incorporated as a town in 1919, a status that it maintained until 1949, when the decline of local coal mines resulted in out migration and economic decline.

Coal mined at Joggins during the first decades of the 20th century primarily fed two electrical generating stations near Maccan, however these plants were outdated by the 1950s and the mines closed shortly after the Springhill Mining Disaster in 1958. Rail service was abandoned to the community in the early 1960s.

The Joggins area was well known in the 19th and early 20th century for the quarrying of limestone grinding wheels, lumber, fishing and dairy production. The Bay of Fundy also boosts a rich tradition of shipbuilding. In the 1800s, wooden coastal schooners were built on the shore to carry coal and mill stones to the United States. Several of the older homes in the Joggins area display the sturdy, practical, yet handsome woodworking of craftsmen trained in shipbuilding. Many of the beaches along the Bay of Fundy are still littered with stone ballast from the hulls of old ships. Today in addition to tourism, the area is known for the commercial cultivation of wild blueberries and agricultural food processing.

The roads and bridges to Joggins were improved in the 1980s and 1990s and area has become popular for tourism, summer homes and retirees. Joggins is a destination on the Nova Scotia Economic and Rural Development and Tourism Glooscap Trail, a spectacular twisting drive of soaring cliffs and deep valleys along the Bay of Fundy. Mi'kmaq legend tells of the a mythical transformer, Glooscap, who created Nova Scotia and controlled the great tides with his magical powers. The Bay of Fundy has the highest tides in the world. Visitors can walk on the ocean floor at low tide, or go rafting on the tidal bore. The high tides have shaped the landscape into one of singular beauty; pristine beaches, dramatic rock outcrops, sea cliffs, waterfalls, and rugged forests. The Joggins area is ecologically diverse and rich in wildlife. Eagles, osprey, and moose are common sights. In the fall the area is popular with birdwatchers; the rich marshes, originally diked by the Acadians in the 1600s, attract hundreds of thousands of migrating birds.

Joggins has been known for its fossils since the early 19th century. The fossils are found in the exposed Pennsylvanian coal seams in the cliffs that overlook the shore. The fossils consist mainly of Late Carboniferous seed ferns, lycopsids, horsetail, early tetrapods and sea life. The daily high tide erodes the cliff, the stone fossils fall out of the coal and are left on the shore when the tide recedes. Fossils have also been found in the area deep shaft mines and in drilling core samples hundreds of feet down. Joggins is one of the easiest places in the world to find early Pennsylvanian coal fossils. In 2008, the Joggins Fossil Cliffs were designated as a UNESCO natural heritage site.

The Joggins Fossil Centre is the museum built on the fossil cliff to display the fossils. Exhibits include the geological history of the Joggins Cliffs, the history of scientific discovery at Joggins, and how area coal mining affected the community. Interpretive tours of the cliffs are offered. The centre is open seasonally.

== Joggins Fossil Cliffs ==
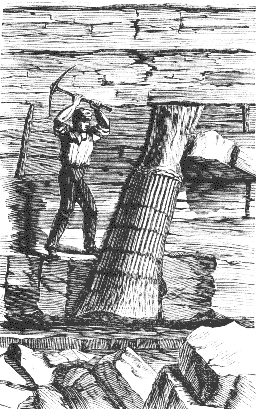
An upright tree-like fossil (a lycophyte such as Sigillaria) preserved in the cliffs at Joggins, Nova Scotia

Joggins is famous for its record of fossils from a rainforest ecosystem approximately 310 million years ago, dating to the Pennsylvanian "Coal Age" during the Late Carboniferous Period.

The dramatic coastal exposure of the Carboniferous (also known as Coal Age) rocks, known as the Joggins Fossil Cliffs, are continually hewn and freshly exposed by the actions of the tides in the Cumberland Basin. Geologists were first attracted to this locality in the late 1820s with Abraham Gesner, Richard Brown, Thomas Jackson and Francis Alger all making important observations. A little later, a party from Williams College, Massachusetts became the first student party to study Joggins for educational reasons in 1835. However, the true fame of Joggins dates to the mid-nineteenth century and the visits in 1842 and 1852 by Charles Lyell, the founder of modern geology and author of Principles of Geology. In his Elements of Geology (1871), Lyell proclaimed the Joggins exposure of Coal Age rocks and fossils to be "the finest example in the world".

The fossil record at Joggins figures in Charles Darwin's On the Origin of Species, and played a role in the Great Oxford Debate of 1860 between Bishop Wilberforce and Thomas Huxley.

Much of the early work to document the fossil record at Joggins was by Nova Scotian geologist Sir William Dawson (1820–1899), who had a close personal and working relationship with his friend and mentor Charles Lyell. Much of Dawson's collection resides at the Redpath Museum of McGill University. Other notable nineteenth century geologists who worked at Joggins include Abraham Gesner, inventor of kerosene, and William Logan, who measured the cliffs bed by bed for the Geological Survey of Canada.

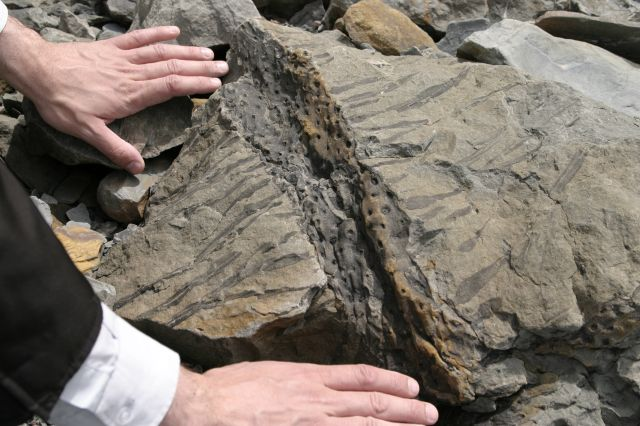
Imprint of a fossilized arborescent lycophyte rhizome called Stigmaria, found near the cliffs at Joggins, Nova Scotia.

In 1852 Lyell and Dawson made a celebrated discovery of tetrapod fossils entombed within an upright tree at Coal Mine Point. Subsequent investigations by Dawson led to the discovery of one of the most important fossils in the history of science, Hylonomus lyelli, which remains the earliest known sauropsid (reptile) in the history of life, but not oldest known amniote, the group that includes all vertebrates that can reproduce out of water. In 2002, Hylonomus lyelli was named the provincial fossil of Nova Scotia. Another vital early tetrapod fossil has been found here, the earliest synapsid, Protoclepsydrops, which is actually earlier than Hylonomus.^{p39}

Other organisms found at the Joggins site include members of the calamites family, lepidodendron, sigillaria, ferns, various early amphibian species, numerous fish species (including evidence of coelacanths) and a variety of arthropod species.

In addition to individual fossils, the Joggins Fossil Cliffs is of interest because it represents a time in Earth's history when a tropical rainforest covered Nova Scotia. Slightly more recent fossil finds indicate that these rainforests collapsed quickly, triggering a mass extinction event, the Carboniferous Rainforest Collapse.

Trackways made by the giant arthropod Arthropleura are preserved at the Joggins Fossil Cliffs. The tree-like lycopodiophyte Sigillaria is famously preserved in situ at Joggins.

== Recent geologic and paleontologic work ==
There has been a surge in interest in Joggins over the past two decades. Recent geologic work has been primarily coordinated by Martin Gibling, Professor of Sedimentology at Dalhousie University.

Amateur fossil collectors have also made major contributions to our knowledge. For example, Don Reid, a long-time resident of Joggins, donated his entire collection of Joggins fossils to the Joggins Fossil Institute. Many of his specimens are on display in the Joggins Fossil Centre.

In 2009, palaeontologist Melissa Grey was hired as the first scientific curator for the Joggins Fossil Institute (JFI). The Joggins Fossil Institute continues to conduct and foster research at the site and hosts international palaeontologists and geologists and conference field-trips. JFI also has a Science Advisory Committee comprising scientists from Maritime universities and government departments. This is a volunteer committee whose mission is to: provide expert and comprehensive advice and support to the JFI on scientific matters respecting the development, conservation and management of the Joggins Fossil Cliffs property, the content of the Joggins Fossil Centre's programs, scientific research related to the fossil cliffs, and scientific issues arising from the site's status as a UNESCO World Heritage Site. The committee also assists in reporting on the status of monitoring programs and state of conservation of the Joggins Fossil Cliffs property.

== World Heritage Site ==
In 2007, a 14.7-km length of the coast constituting the Joggins Fossil Cliffs was nominated by Canada to UNESCO as a natural World Heritage Site. It was officially inscribed on the World Heritage List in on July 7, 2008.

=== IUGS geological heritage site ===
In respect of the 'world's best example of 'Coal Age' tropical forests and [the site of its] oldest known reptiles', the International Union of Geological Sciences (IUGS) included the ' Coal Age Joggins Fossil Cliffs' in its assemblage of 100 'geological heritage sites' around the world in a listing published in October 2022. The organization defines an IUGS Geological Heritage Site as 'a key place with geological elements and/or processes of international scientific relevance, used as a reference, and/or with a substantial contribution to the development of geological sciences through history.'

== Gallery ==
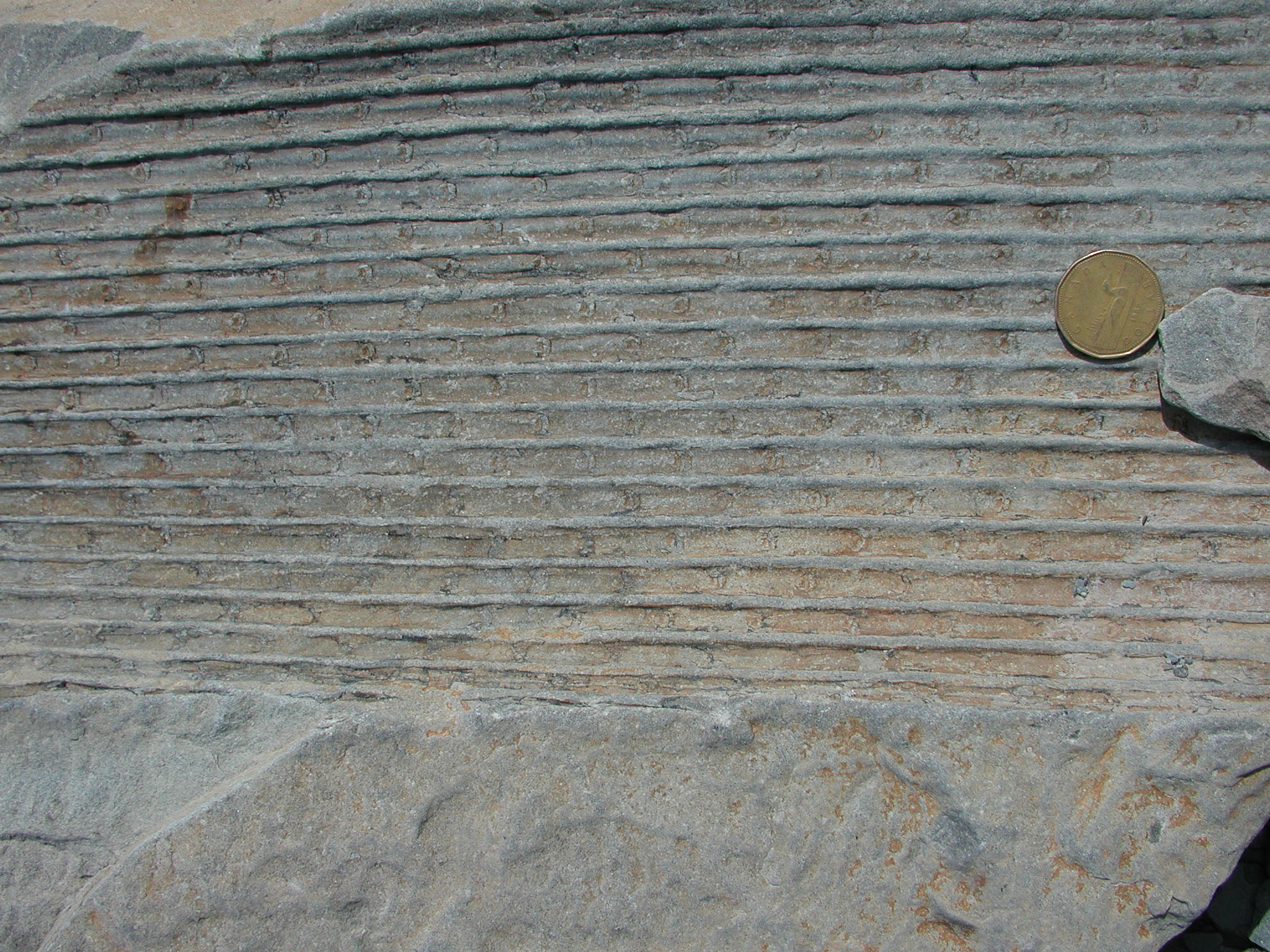
Sigillaria lycopod fossil, showing its bark impression (Canadian one dollar coin, 26.5mm for scale)

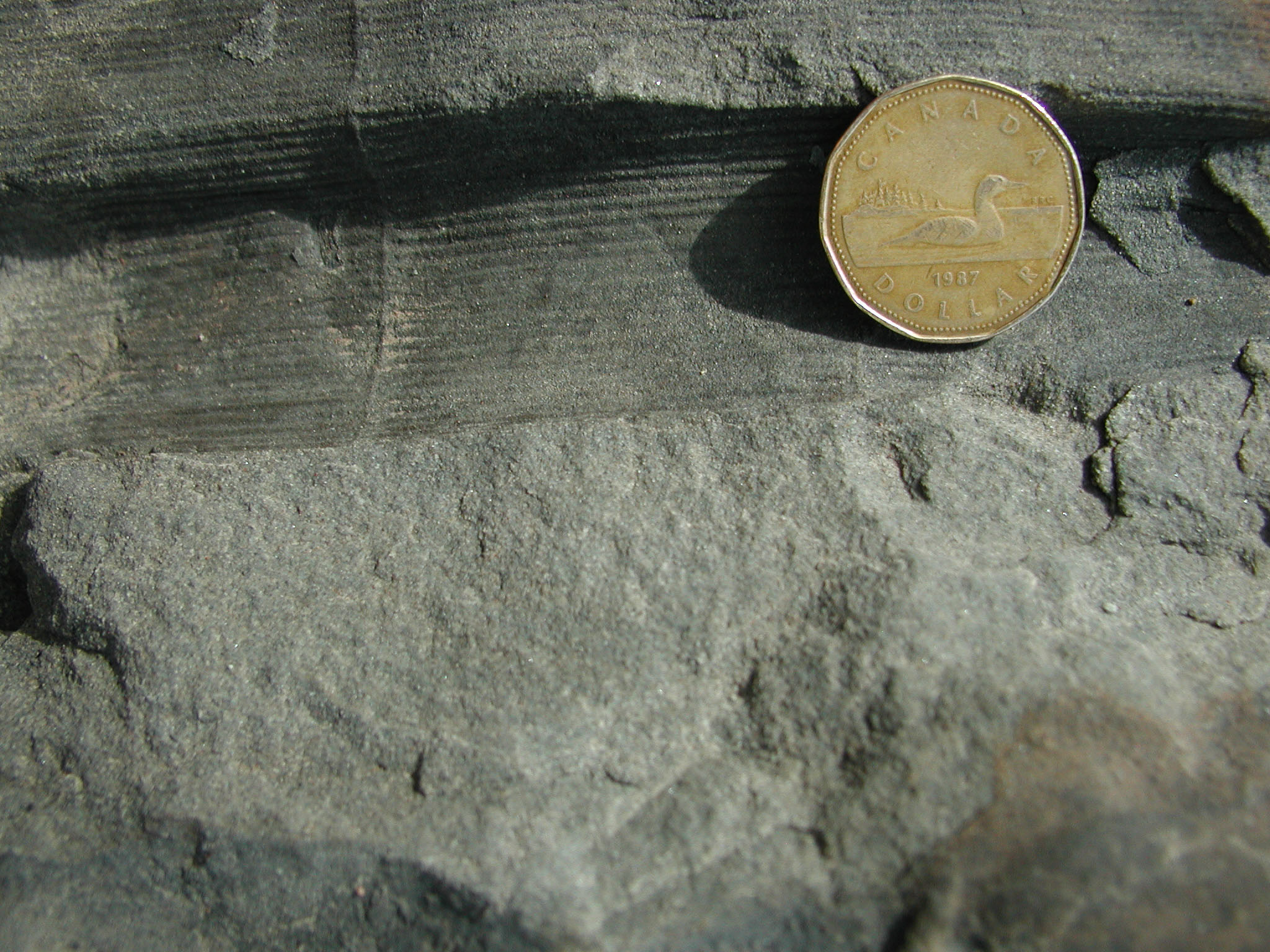
Calamites (horsetail) fossil

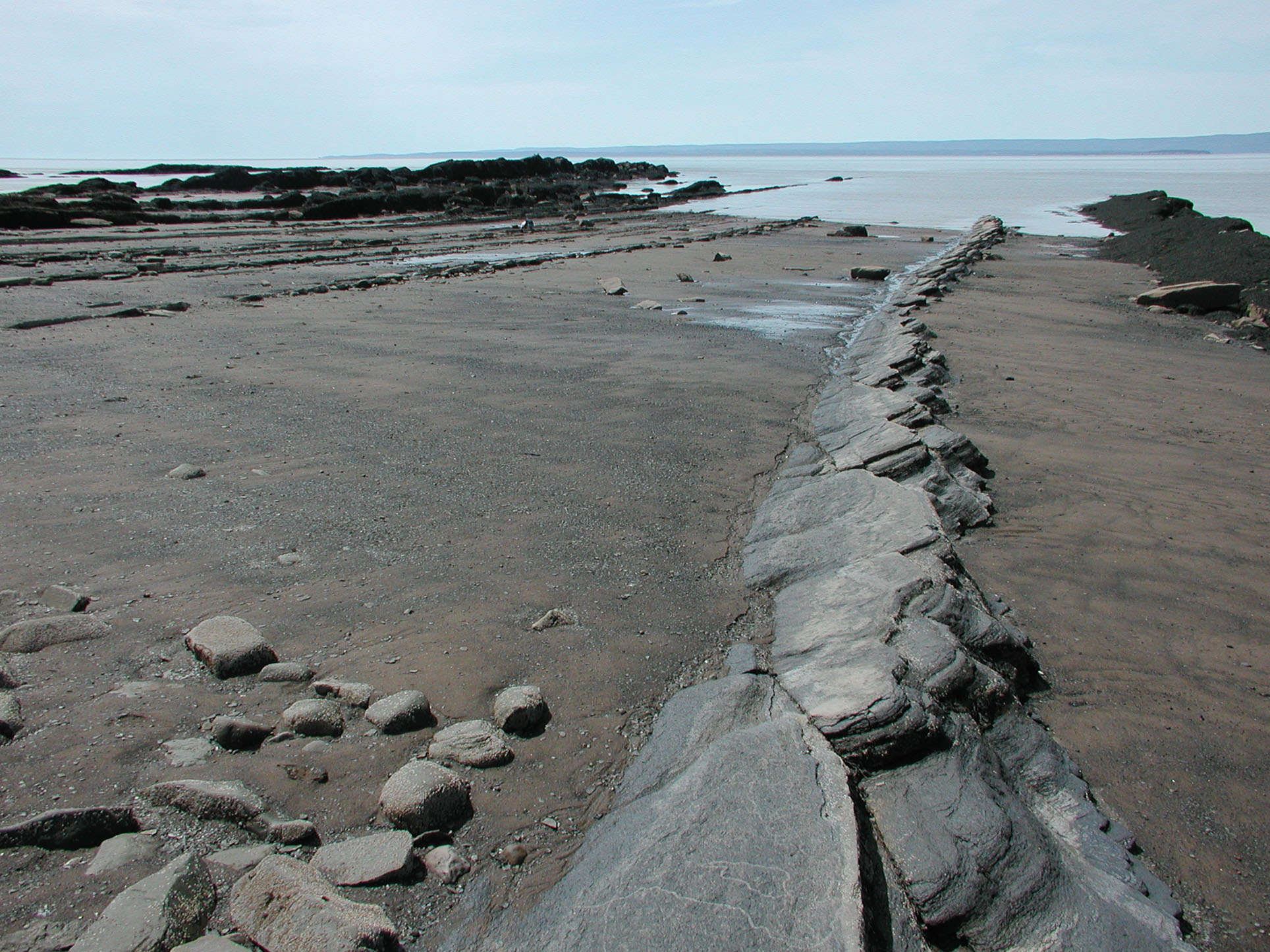
Beach, showing Carboniferous stratification
