= Chignecto National Wildlife Area =

Protected area in Nova Scotia

Coordinates: 45°48′0″N 64°14′58″W

- Interactive map of Chignecto National Wildlife Area
- Location: Nova Scotia
- Nearest city: Amherst
- Area: 475 hectares (1,170 acres)
- Established: 1982
- Governing body: Environment Canada

Chignecto National Wildlife Area is a 475 hectares (1,170 acres) National Wildlife Area located in Cumberland County, Nova Scotia, adjacent to John Lusby Marsh National Wildlife Area and Amherst. The wildlife area was established in 1982, and is protected and managed in accordance with the Wildlife Area Regulations. It is administered by Environment Canada. The area overlaps with the Amherst Point Migratory Bird Sanctuary.

The area has controlled water-level freshwater impoundments, natural sinkhole ponds, forests, and old fields, and a variety of wetlands.

The upland and wetland habitats in the area attracts many species of birds. 228 bird species were found, and over 100 bird species breed in the area. Several mamals have been found in the area, and many types of trees grow in the area.

== Name ==
The name Chignecto derives from the Mi'kmaq name Siknikt, meaning 'drainage place'. Siknikt, also known as Signigtewa'gi, is one of the seven (or eight) districts of the Mi'kmaw homeland: Mi'kma'ki, covering regions in south and eastern New Brunswick as well as in New Scotia around the isthmus.

== Geography ==
Chignecto National Wildlife Area comprises 213 hectares (530 acres) of controlled water-level freshwater impoundments which were built by Ducks Unlimited Canada in early 1973, 110 hectares (270 acres) of natural sinkhole ponds, 100 hectares (250 acres) of forest habitat, and 52 hectares (130 acres) of old fields in various stages of reforestation, for a total of 475 hectares (1,170 acres). The area features a variety of wetland types, such as natural ponds and shallow, controlled water-level marshes.

Layton’s Lake, one of the lakes in the National Wildlife Area, is formed by a sinkhole and has chemocline, which is rare for lakes. Prior to the 1960s, the lake experienced periodic intrusions of seawater. At a depth of 8 to 8.5 metres (26 to 28 ft), the lake salinity transitions from freshwater to saltwater.

== Ecology ==
=== Birds and mammals ===
The upland and wetland habitats in the area attract many species of birds. A total of 228 bird species were recorded in recent years, and more than 100 birds breed in the area. Birds include Canada goose, Anas rubripes, northern pintail, green-winged teal, blue-winged teal, American wigeon, northern shoveler, and ring-necked duck regularly breed in the National Wildlife Area. Pied-billed grebe, American bittern, Virginia rail, Sora, common moorhen, American coot, black tern, and marsh wren is commonly encountered. Pied-billed grebes are particularly numerous, with 1.7 nests per hectare (0.69 nests per acre) reported within Impoundment 1 in 1983. Gadwall, wood duck, redhead, and ruddy ducks are rarely found.

The area is home to White-tailed deer, red fox, raccoon, porcupine, striped skunk, beaver, muskrat, masked shrew, northern flying squirrel, star-nosed mole, snowshoe hare, and woodchuck.

=== Reptiles, amphibians and fish ===
Reptiles and amphibians known or suspected in Chignecto National Wildlife Area include Rana clamitans, northern spring peeper, wood frog, mink frog, northern leopard frog, yellow spotted salamander, and maritime garter snake. At night, following the first warm rains of spring provides a rare opportunity to see reptiles and amphibians that are rarely seen.

Fish include white perch, yellow perch, American eel, and brown bullhead. The small lakes provide a suitable habitat for brook trout.

=== Flora ===
The forested uplands of Amherst Point are dominated by conifers, particularly spruce, balsam fir, and eastern larch. Eastern hemlock grows on the slopes and ridges surrounding some sinkholes. A few sugar maple and yellow birch remain of the once-thriving hardwood stand. Hawthorns and wild apple trees occur commonly along the woodland edges. Silver maple, Manitoba maple and scots pine grow around the former homesteads.

Cattails and bur-reed are the most common aquatic plants found around the edges of bodies of water, while water milfoil and other submergent plants grow in deeper waters.

== History ==
By the late 1600s, French Acadian settlers expanded outwards from Beaubassin on the Fort Lawrence Ridge and settled several sites bordering the Chignecto Isthmus. It is likely that some of the uplands were used as farms. At the late 19th century, large areas of white spruce reveal remnants of cleared and cultivated land, while introduced trees such as Norway maple and Manitoba maple. The diverse ecosystem made it an ideal location for both fishing and hunting.

In 1905, a New York company formed a short-lived mining operation named Maritime Gypsum Company. In that same year, they constructed a railway line linking its quarry to a wharf on John Lusby Marsh. A portion of the old rail line now forms part of the walking trail within the area. In the late 20th century, the area was perfect for outdoor activities, especially in winter. The sinkholes surrounded by tall trees offered a great spot for sociallizing and skating.

In the beginning of 1973, Ducks Unlimited Canada established 213 hectares (530 acres) of controlled water level freshwater wetlands. Nine years later, the land got designated as Chignecto National Wildlife Area in 1982. Decayed remnants of the cannonball-topped fence posts can still be found in the wildlife area.

== Recreation ==
Recreations including wildlife viewing, hiking, participating in a group meal or group event involving 15 or more people, operating a vehicle, other than a snowmobile or an all-terrain vehicle, on designated roads and in designated parking areas, swimming, picking edible plants and mushrooms, boat riding, motorized boating (less than 10 horsepower), cross country skiing, snowshoeing, and skating, sport fishing, in accordance with any applicable federal permit is allowed.

Humane trapping of furbearers is legal within Chignecto National Wildlife Area, which provides a significant income to local trappers.

== See also ==
- List of protected areas of Nova Scotia
