= Halfway River, Nova Scotia =

Community in Nova Scotia, Canada

Halfway River
- Location within Nova Scotia
- Coordinates: 45°34′40.4″N 64°34′33.1″W
- Country: Canada
- Province: Nova Scotia
- Municipality: Cumberland County
- Time zone: UTC-4 (AST)
- Postal code: B
- Area code: 902

Halfway River is a rural community in the Canadian province of Nova Scotia, located in Cumberland County.
