= Middle Sackville, Nova Scotia =

Middle Sackville
- Location of Lower Sackville, Nova Scotia
- Coordinates: 44°47′44.1″N 63°43′48.4″W
- Country: Canada
- Province: Nova Scotia
- Municipality: Halifax Regional Municipality
- Time zone: UTC-4 (AST)
  - Summer (DST): UTC-3 (ADT)
- Area codes: 902, 782

Middle Sackville is a suburban community located in Halifax Regional Municipality in Nova Scotia, Canada. It was named after George Germain, 1st Viscount Sackville.

== Geography ==
Middle Sackville is located immediately north of Lower Sackville and south of Upper Sackville. Middle Sackville is located approximately 32 km (20 mi) north of Downtown Halifax.

== History ==
Prior to European colonization, this area was inhabited by the Mi'kmaq. As a result of its unincorporated status until 1996, Middle Sackville and adjacent unincorporated communities such as Lower Sackville and Upper Sackville did not benefit from appropriate planning and are an example of urban sprawl. The boundaries for the three Sackville communities were "officially" defined in 2013 by HRM and areas (such as the popular Millwood subdivision) that in the past were informally called Lower Sackville were changed to Middle Sackville. Boundaries were based on historic accounts of the areas.

Middle Sackville was the site of an early black community in the area of Maroon Hill. The Maroons were blacks brought in from Jamaica to help with the building of the Halifax Citadel and other capital works. The Maroons did not settle permanently and were later relocated to Freetown by the British.

== Transportation ==
=== Road ===
Middle Sackville is served by Trunk 1, also known as Sackville Drive on this section. Highway 101 is a 4 lane provincial arterial route that bypasses the community, and can be accessed via Margeson Drive which meets Sackville Drive at a roundabout. This gives commuters easy access to the rest of HRM and the Annapolis Valley. Speed limits in Middle Sackville vary from 110 km/h on the highway to 50 km/h on residential streets.

=== Public transportation ===
Halifax Transit provides service to the community via routes 83 Springfield, 183 Springfield Express, 85 Millwood, and 185 Millwood Express. These routes replaced their predecessors in November, 2019.

In the past there have been talks of adding a commuter rail service to Halifax via Windsor Junction and the disused Windsor and Hantsport railway line which bypasses the community, possibly being operated by VIA Rail. Lack of political support regarding construction and operating costs in recent years have scuttled the plans.

== Education ==
The community is home to five schools, including Millwood Elementary, Sackville Heights Elementary, Harry R. Hamilton Elementary, Sackville Heights Junior High, and Millwood High School. The schools have a combined population of about 2,700 students as of 2019.
