= Halfway River (Avon River tributary) =

Location
- Country: Canada
- Province: Nova Scotia

Physical characteristics
- Mouth
  - location: Avon River
  - coordinates: 45°03′47″N 64°10′23″W

The Halfway River is a tributary of the Avon River in Nova Scotia, Canada.

There are two impoundments located within the Halfway River system, used by Minas Basin Pulp and Power Limited for water storage.
