= St. Croix River (Nova Scotia) =

Coordinates: 45°0′2.3″N 64°6′20.4″W

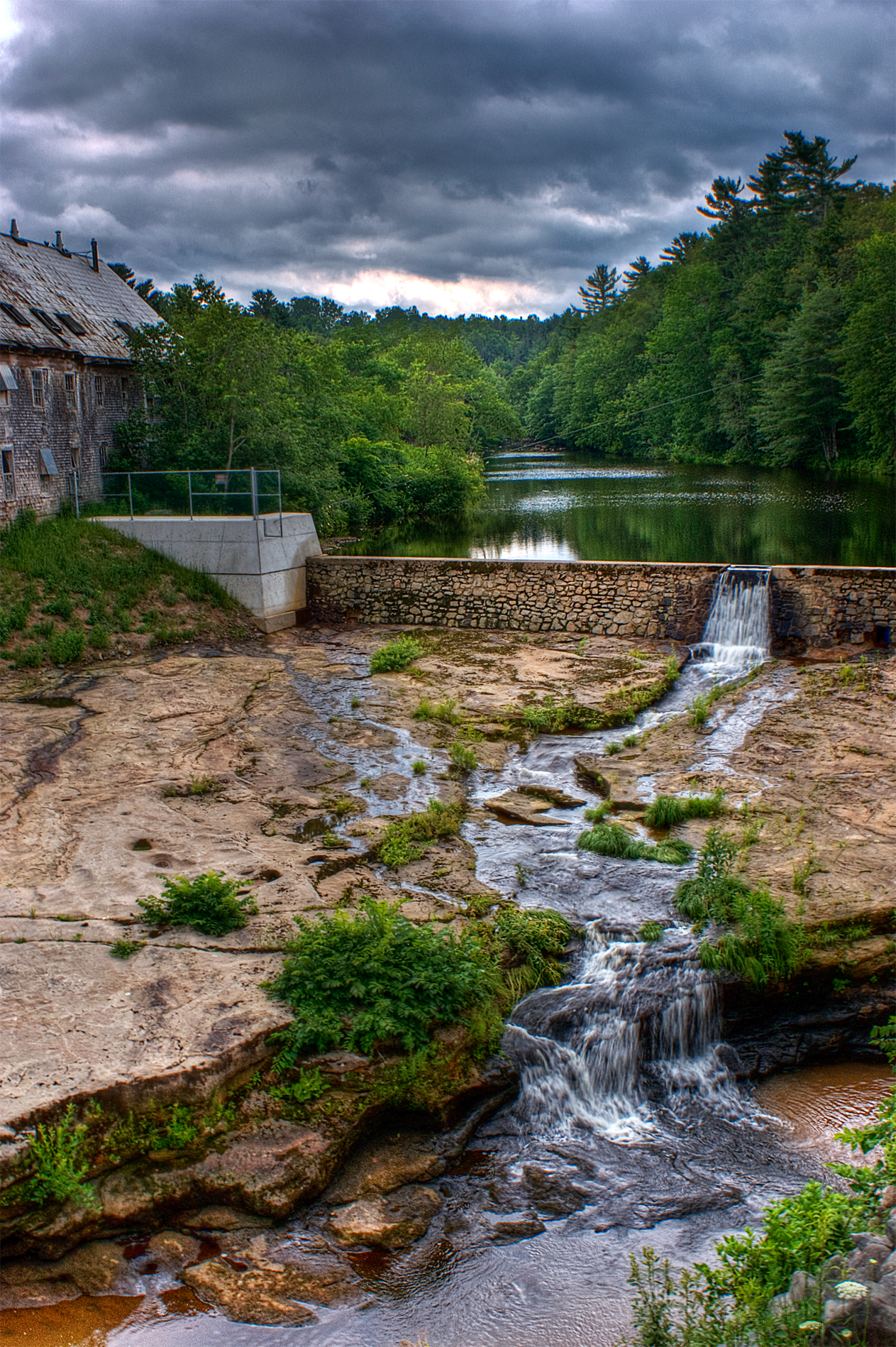
- St. Croix River (lower dam at St Croix)

Location
- Country: Canada
- Province: Nova Scotia

Physical characteristics
- Source
  - location: Lake Panuke
- Mouth
  - location: Confluence with the Avon River
  - elevation: sea level
- Length: 34 km (21 mi)
- Basin size: 1,368 km^{2} (528 sq mi)

Basin features
- Progression: Avon River—Minas Basin—Bay of Fundy

The St. Croix River is a river in Nova Scotia entirely contained in Hants and Halifax Counties. Its headwaters are Panuke Lake. The river has been exploited for water power. There were water mills in the nineteenth century and in the 1930s three hydroelectric dams were built; they still operate.

The lower reaches of the St. Croix are tidal. There is a wide flood plain where the river has cut through limestone bedrock now exposed as white cliffs. The calcareous soil harbours the rare Rams Head Lady Slipper.

The Nova Scotia Government estimates that the number of people living within the St. Croix watershed numbered 19,233 in 2011.

== History ==
The river and (Panuk - Mi’kmaw Village) Panuke Lake (was once a river frequented by spawning salmon before it was dammed, displacing the Indigenous peoples) were used as an important portage route first by the Mi'kmaq and later by European explorers and settlers. There is an unpopulated Indian reserve (St Croix Indian Reserve) on the lake.

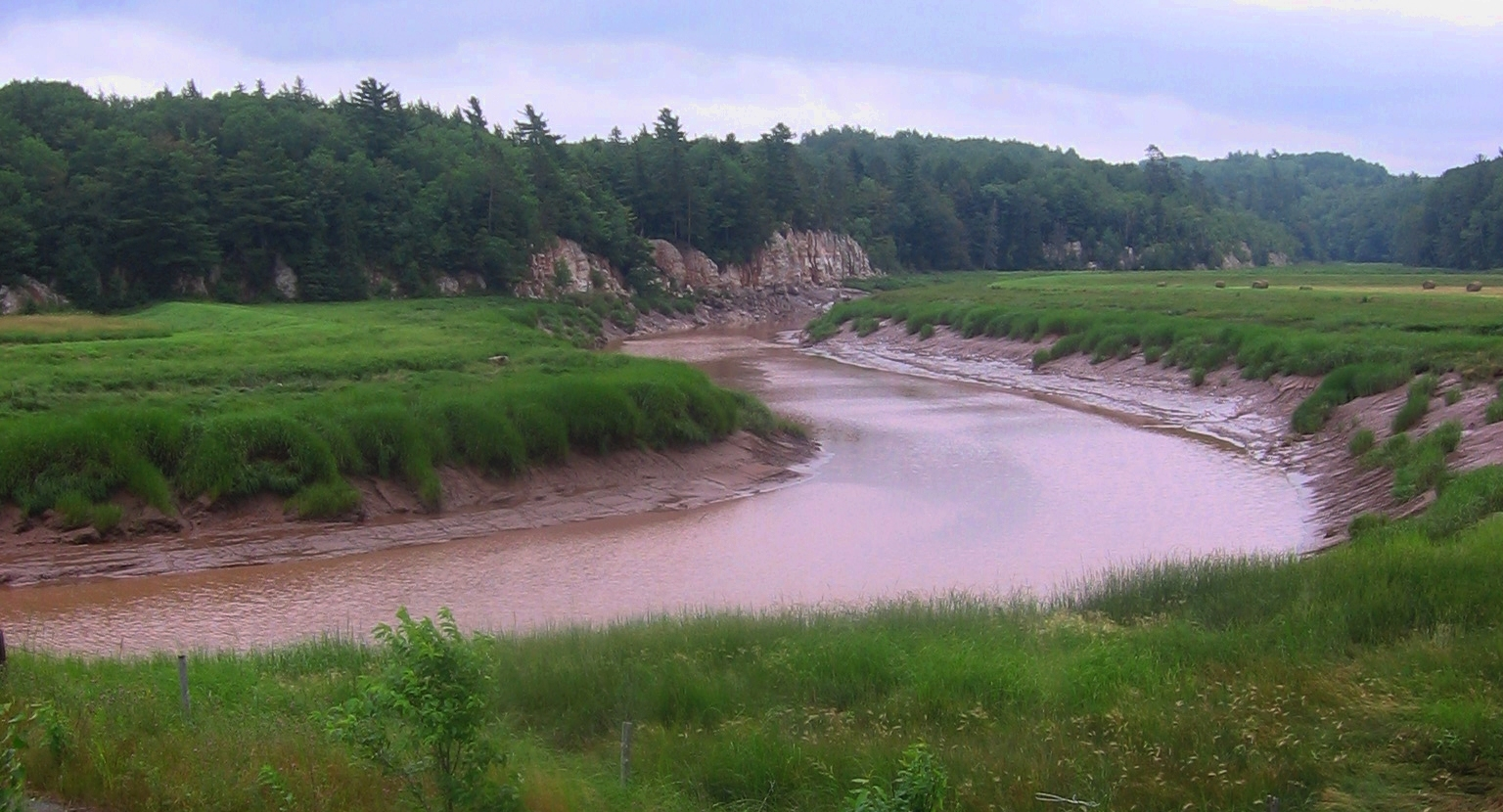
Meandering lower tidal reaches of the St. Croix

European settlement began with the Acadians (who named the river, calling the region Pisiguit).

=== The Battle at St Croix (1750) ===
The Battle at St. Croix happened between New England Rangers and the Mi'kmaq. To capture the Acadians involved in the British defeat at the Fort Logis, Grand Pre the previous year, Cornwallis sent John Gorham (military officer) to Piziquid to construct Fort Edward (Nova Scotia) and imprison the Acadians. After two days of marching from Fort Sackville (present day Bedford), they come to the St Croix River. At the river a battle broke out with the Mi'kmaq. Gorham took over a saw mill and two local Acadian homes for protection. The Mi'kmaq numbers continued to grow, therefore Gorham sent a messenger to Fort Sackville for reinforcements, which ended the battle. After the Expulsion of the Acadians, New England Planters settled the area. Extensive land grants were let by the Nova Scotia colonial government beginning in 1761.

Today, the St. Croix is a popular river for canoe and kayaking enthusiasts. The lower floodplains are dyked and farmed. The river's tidal bore may be viewed at Tidal View Farm.

=== 2023 Flood ===
On July 21 and 22, 2023, Nova Scotia received over 250+ millimeters of rain in less than an 8-hour period, leading to many rivers in the province to a 100-year flood. The water along the St. Croix rose so high that the dam began to breach, prompting the evacuation of everyone residing along the St. Croix River on the morning of the 22nd with fears the dam may have broke, but evacuation orders were rescinded later that evening. 3 people, a 52-year-old man, 2 children, were found deceased on July 24 and 25, respectively, after having been reported missing after being swept away by floodwaters. A fourth person, identified as a youth who was travelling with a 52-year-old man in the car that got swept away, was found August 2 along the shore in Advocate Harbour.

== See also ==
- List of rivers of Nova Scotia
