= Maccan =

Community in Nova Scotia, Canada

Coordinates: 45°43′14″N 64°14′57″W

Springhill in Nova Scotia

Maccan is a community in the Canadian province of Nova Scotia, located in Cumberland County.

The word Maccan is derived from the Mi'kmaq word 'Maakan' meaning a good place for fishing. It was a thriving coal mining, farming, railroad and river ship building community. Maccan was home of the famed Nova Scotia Intermediate baseball club, the Maccan Royals. Several books on the history of Maccan have been written. Copies are available at the Cumberland County Museum in Amherst, and in the Amherst Public Library.

Several historic figures were born in Maccan, including Jonathan McCully, Father of Confederation.
