= Barrington River (Nova Scotia) =

River in Nova Scotia, Canada

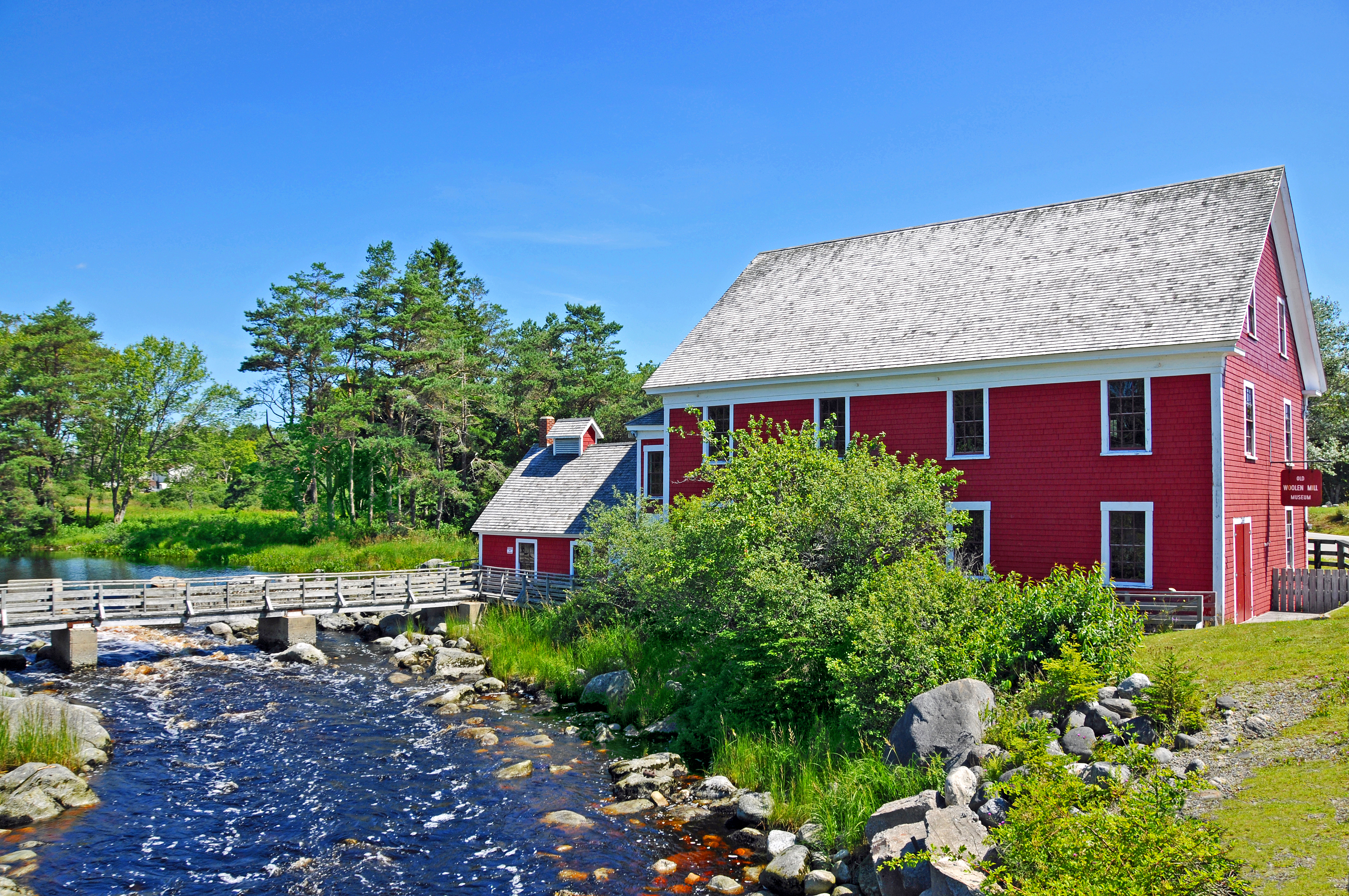
- Barrington Woollen Mill on the Barrington River

- Location within Nova Scotia

Location
- Country: Canada
- Province: Nova Scotia

Physical characteristics
- Mouth: Atlantic Ocean
  - coordinates: 43°34′3.3″N 65°34′42.7″W
- Length: 9 mi (14 km)

The Barrington River is a small river in the South Shore region of Nova Scotia, Canada.

The river rises in Barrington Lake and flows generally southwards into Barrington Bay by the community of Barrington Head in the Municipality of the District of Barrington. It is about 9 miles (14 km) long and was formerly noted as an excellent salmon fishery.
