= List of communities in Pictou County, Nova Scotia =

List of communities in Pictou County, Nova Scotia

Communities are ordered by the highway on which they are located, whose routes start after each terminus near the largest community.

== Towns ==
- New Glasgow - Stellarton - Pictou - Westville - Trenton - Thorburn

== Trunk routes ==
- Trunk 4: Salt Springs - West River - Greenhill - Alma - New Glasgow - French River - Broadway - Barney's River Station - Marshy Hope
- Trunk 6: Marshville - River John - Seafoam - Toney River - Caribou River

== Collector roads ==
- Route 245: Egerton - Merigomish - Lower Barney's River - Lismore - Knoydart
- Route 256: West Branch River John - Scotsburn - Lyons Brook
- Route 289: Little Harbour - New Glasgow - Westville - Rocklin - Lansdowne
- Route 347: New Glasgow - Priestville- Coalburn- Thorburn - Greenwood - McPhersons Mills - Meiklefield - Blue Mountain - Moose River - Garden of Eden - Eden Lake- Rocky Mountain - Willowdale - East River- East River St. Marys
- Route 348: Little Harbour - Chance Harbour - Pictou Landing - Trenton - New Glasgow - Stellarton - Churchville - Springville - Bridgeville - Glencoe - Sunnybrae
- Route 374: New Glasgow - Riverton - Eureka - Hopewell - Lorne - Trafalgar
- Route 376: West River - Durham

== Rural roads ==
- Alma
- Avondale
- Bailey Brook
- Black River
- Cape John
- Elgin
- Glengarry
- Granton
- Green's Brook
- Hodson
- Iron Ore
- Meadowville
- Mount Thom
- New Gairlock
- Pictou Island
- Piedmont
- St. Pauls
- Sutherland's River
- Sylvester
- Watervale
- Welsford
- West River Station
