= Nova Scotia Route 347 =

Highway in Nova Scotia, Canada

Route 347

Route information
- Maintained by Nova Scotia Department of Transportation and Infrastructure Renewal
- Length: 66 km (41 mi)

Major junctions
- South end: Trunk 7 in Aspen
- Hwy 104 (TCH) in Coalburn
- North end: Trunk 4 in New Glasgow

Location
- Country: Canada
- Province: Nova Scotia

Highway system
- Provincial highways in Nova Scotia; 100-series
← Route 344	→ Route 348

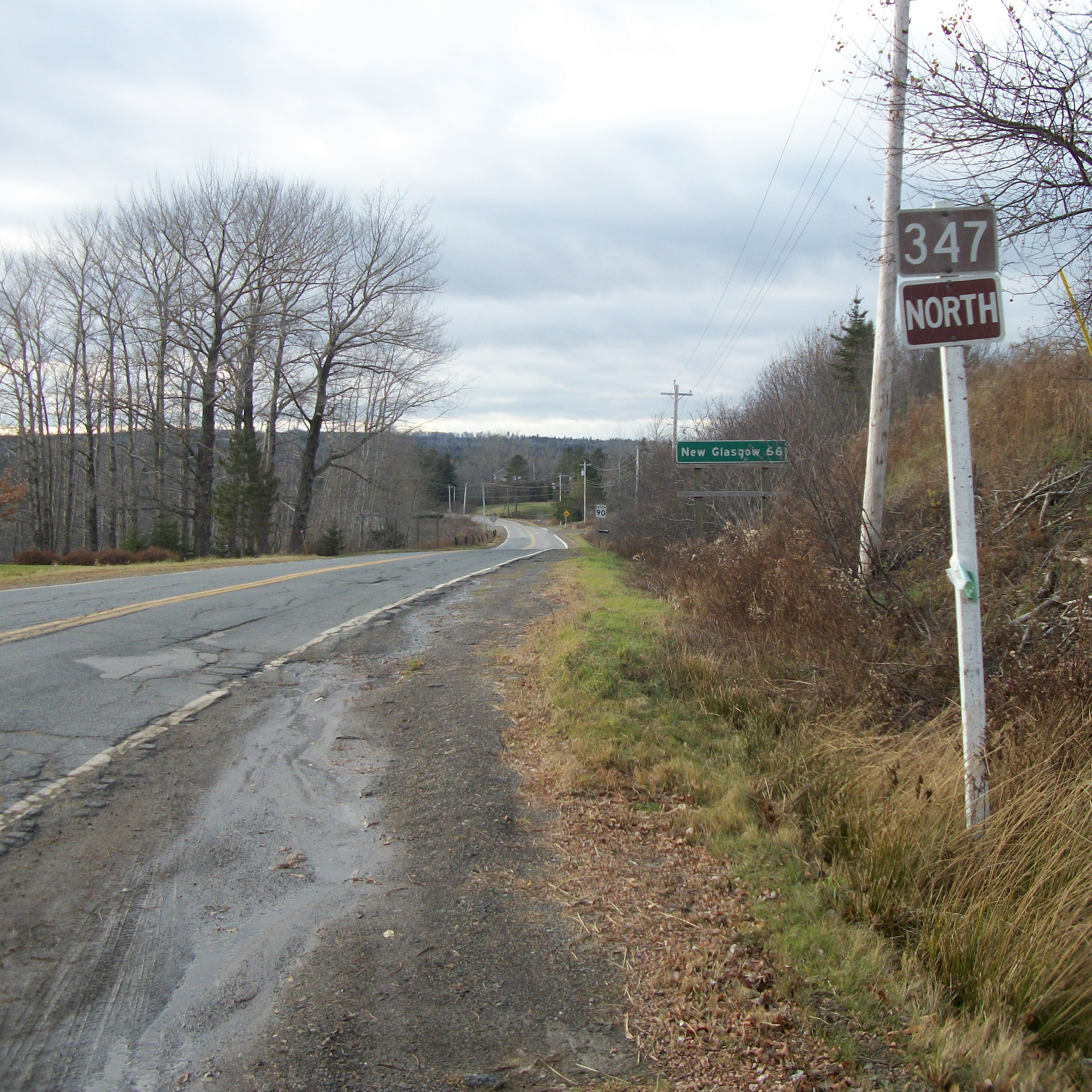
Route sign in Aspen, Guysborough County, Nova Scotia near its junction with Trunk 7

Route 347 is a collector road in the Canadian province of Nova Scotia. It is located in the northeastern part of the province and connects New Glasgow at Trunk 4 with Aspen at Trunk 7.

== Communities ==
- New Glasgow
- Priestville
- Coalburn
- Greenwood
- MacPhersons Mills
- Blue Mountain
- Moose River
- Garden of Eden
- Eden Lake
- Rocky Mountain
- Willowdale
- East River St. Marys
- Newtown
- Denver
- Aspen

== See also ==
- List of Nova Scotia provincial highways
