= Pictou West =

Provincial electoral district in Nova Scotia, Canada

Nova Scotia electoral district

Provincial electoral district
- Legislature: Nova Scotia House of Assembly
MLA
Marco MacLeod
Progressive Conservative
- District created: 1949
- First contested: 1949
- Last contested: 2024

Demographics
- Population (2011): 13,922
- Electors: 10,886
- Area (km²): 1,190
- Pop. density (per km²): 11.7
- Census division: Pictou County
- Census subdivision(s): Pictou, Pictou, Subd. A, Pictou Subd. B

Pictou West is a provincial electoral district in Nova Scotia, Canada, that elects one member of the Nova Scotia House of Assembly. Its member of the Legislative Assembly (MLA) since 2024 has been Marco MacLeod of the Progressive Conservative Association of Nova Scotia (PC).

The riding was created prior to the 1949 election out of the two-seat Pictou riding.

== Geography ==
The riding includes the western half of Pictou County, plus the town of Pictou. The riding contains the communities of Abercrombie, Alma, Bay View, Bigney, Black River, Braeshore, Brookland, Campbell Hill, Cape John, Caribou, Caribou Island, Caribou River, Central Caribou, Central West River, College Grant, Concord, Dalhousie, Diamond, Durham, East Branch, Elmfield, Four Mile Brook, Glengarry Station, Granton, Greenhill, Haliburton, Heathbell, Hedgeville, Hodson, Lansdowne Station, Loch Broom, Loganville, Louisville, Lovat, Lyons Brook, Marshdale, Marshville, Meadowville, Melville, Millbrook, Millsville, Mountain Road, Mount Thom, Mount William, New Gairloch, New Lairg, Pictou Island, Plainfield, Pleasant Valley, Poplar Hill, River John, Rockfield, Rocklin, Salt Springs, Scotsburn, Seafoam, Scotch Hill, Six Mile Brook, Sundridge, Sylvester, Toney River, Union Centre, Waterside, Watervale, Welsford, West Branch, West River Station, White Hill

The geography of Pictou West is 1,190 km^{2} (460 sq mi) of land area.

== Members of the Legislative Assembly ==
This riding has elected the following members of the Legislative Assembly:

Pictou West
Legislature	Years	Member	Party
44th	1949–1953	Stewart W. Proudfoot	Liberal
45th	1953–1956	Stewart W. Proudfoot	Liberal
46th	1956–1960	Harvey Veniot	Progressive Conservative
47th	1960–1963	Harvey Veniot	Progressive Conservative
48th	1963–1967	Harvey Veniot	Progressive Conservative
49th	1967–1970	Harvey Veniot	Progressive Conservative
50th	1970–1974	Harvey Veniot	Progressive Conservative
51st	1974–1978	Dan Reid	Liberal
52nd	1978–1981	Donald P. McInnes	Progressive Conservative
53rd	1981–1984	Donald P. McInnes	Progressive Conservative
54th	1984–1988	Donald P. McInnes	Progressive Conservative
55th	1988–1993	Donald P. McInnes	Progressive Conservative
56th	1993–1998	Donald P. McInnes	Progressive Conservative
57th	1998–1999	Charlie Parker	New Democratic
58th	1999–2003	Muriel Baillie	Progressive Conservative
59th	2003–2006	Charlie Parker	New Democratic
60th	2006–2009	Charlie Parker	New Democratic
61st	2009–2013	Charlie Parker	New Democratic
62nd	2013–2017	Karla MacFarlane	Progressive Conservative
63rd	2017–2021	Karla MacFarlane	Progressive Conservative
64th	2021–2024	Karla MacFarlane	Progressive Conservative
64th	2024–2024	Marco MacLeod	Progressive Conservative
65th	2024–present	Marco MacLeod	Progressive Conservative

== Election results ==
=== 2024 ===
2024 Nova Scotia general election
Party	Candidate	Votes	%	±%
Progressive Conservative	Marco MacLeod	4,325	74.08	+1.60
Liberal	Mary Wooldridge-Elliott	778	13.33	+3.78
New Democratic	Carol Ferguson	620	10.62	-5.92
Green	Clare Brett	115	1.97	+0.54
Total valid votes		5,838		
Total rejected ballots		30		
Turnout		5,869	47.74	
Eligible voters		12,293		
Progressive Conservative hold		Swing		
Source: Elections Nova Scotia

=== 2024 by-election ===
Nova Scotia provincial by-election, May 21, 2024 Resignation of Karla MacFarlane
Party	Candidate	Votes	%	±%	Expenditures
Progressive Conservative	Marco MacLeod	4,159	72.48	+8.86	$47,956
New Democratic	Melinda MacKenzie	949	16.54	+4.18	$38,663
Liberal	Mary Wooldridge-Elliott	548	9.55	-11.86	$15,865
Green	Clare Brett	82	1.43	-0.33	–
Total valid votes/Expense limit		5,738	99.29		
Total rejected ballots		43	0.74		
Turnout		5,781	47.73	-13.71	
Eligible voters		12,112			
Progressive Conservative hold		Swing		+2.34	
Source: Elections Nova Scotia

=== 2021 ===
2021 Nova Scotia general election
Party	Candidate	Votes	%	±%	Expenditures
Progressive Conservative	Karla MacFarlane	4,487	63.62	+1.04	$26,401.55
Liberal	Mary Wooldridge-Elliott	1,510	21.41	+4.95	$29,635.78
New Democratic	Rick Parker	872	12.36	-6.30	$25,332.33
Green	Clare Brett	124	1.76	-0.54	$200.00
Independent	John A. Clark	60	0.85		$200.00
Total valid votes/expense limit		7,053	99.63	–	$69,087.61
Total rejected ballots		26	0.37		
Turnout		7,079	61.44		
Eligible voters		11,521			
Progressive Conservative hold		Swing		-1.96	
Source: Elections Nova Scotia

=== 2017 ===
2017 provincial election redistributed results
Party	Vote	%
Progressive Conservative	4,380	62.58
New Democratic	1,306	18.66
Liberal	1,152	16.46
Green	161	2.30

2017 Nova Scotia general election
Party	Candidate	Votes	%	±%
Progressive Conservative	Karla MacFarlane	4,333	62.44	+22.35
New Democratic	Shawn McNamara	1,302	18.76	-15.53
Liberal	Ben MacLean	1,143	16.47	-9.14
Green	Cecile Vigneault	161	2.32	
Total valid votes		6,939	99.58	
Total rejected ballots		29	0.42	-0.40
Turnout		6,968	62.08	-7.28
Eligible voters		11,225		
Progressive Conservative hold		Swing		+18.94
Source: Elections Nova Scotia

=== 2013 ===
2013 Nova Scotia general election
Party	Candidate	Votes	%	±%
Progressive Conservative	Karla MacFarlane	3,026	40.10	20.10
New Democratic	Charlie Parker	2,588	34.29	-23.34
Liberal	Glennie Langille	1,933	25.61	5.55
Total valid votes		7,547	99.19	–
Total rejected ballots		62	0.81	+0.56
Turnout		7,609	69.36	+2.49
Eligible voters		10,971		
Progressive Conservative gain from New Democratic		Swing		+21.72
Source(s) Source: Nova Scotia Legislature (2024). "Electoral History for Pictou West" (PDF). nslegislature.ca. Nova Scotia, Chief Electoral Officer (2013). 39th Provincial General Election, October 8, 2013: Volume 1 – Statement of Votes & Statistics (PDF) (Report). Elections Nova Scotia. Archived from the original (PDF) on 10 April 2018.

=== 2009 ===
2009 Nova Scotia general election
Party	Candidate	Votes	%	±%
New Democratic	Charlie Parker	4,226	57.63	2.74
Liberal	Paul Landry	1,471	20.06	10.88
Progressive Conservative	Leonard Fraser	1,466	19.99	-14.00
Green	Chelsea Richardson	170	2.32	0.38
Total valid votes		7,333	99.74	–
Total rejected ballots		19	0.26	-0.23
Turnout		7,352	66.86	-1.93
Eligible voters		10,996		
New Democratic hold		Swing		-4.07
Source(s) Source: Nova Scotia Legislature (2024). "Electoral History for Pictou West" (PDF). nslegislature.ca.

=== 2006 ===
2006 Nova Scotia general election
Party	Candidate	Votes	%	±%
New Democratic	Charlie Parker	4,173	54.89	10.85
Progressive Conservative	Ron Baillie	2,584	33.99	1.31
Liberal	Sandy MacKay	698	9.18	-11.99
Green	Douglas Earl Corbett	147	1.93	–
Total valid votes		7,602	99.52	–
Total rejected ballots		37	0.48	-0.09
Turnout		7,639	68.79	-12.22
Eligible voters		11,105		
New Democratic hold		Swing		+4.77
Source(s) Source: Nova Scotia Legislature (2024). "Electoral History for Pictou West" (PDF). nslegislature.ca.

=== 2003 ===
2003 Nova Scotia general election
Party	Candidate	Votes	%	±%
New Democratic	Charlie Parker	3,410	44.05	8.36
Progressive Conservative	Paul Veniot	2,530	32.68	-4.78
Liberal	Edward MacMaster	1,639	21.17	-4.30
Independent	Doug Corbett	163	2.11	–
Total valid votes		7,742	99.42	–
Total rejected ballots		45	0.58	-0.05
Turnout		7,787	81.01	+2.87
Eligible voters		9,612		
New Democratic gain from Progressive Conservative		Swing		+6.57
Source(s) Source: Nova Scotia Legislature (2024). "Electoral History for Pictou West" (PDF). nslegislature.ca.

=== 1999 ===
1999 Nova Scotia general election
Party	Candidate	Votes	%	±%
Progressive Conservative	Muriel Baillie	3,102	37.46	-2.39
New Democratic	Charlie Parker	2,955	35.69	-4.57
Liberal	Paul Landry	2,109	25.47	5.59
Independent	D. Ed Berringer	114	1.38	–
Total valid votes		8,280	99.38	–
Total rejected ballots		52	0.62	+0.13
Turnout		8,332	78.15	+1.82
Eligible voters		10,662		
Progressive Conservative gain from New Democratic		Swing		+1.09
Source(s) Source: Nova Scotia Legislature (2024). "Electoral History for Pictou West" (PDF). nslegislature.ca. Nova Scotia, Chief Electoral Officer (1999). Returns of the General Election for the House of Assembly, Thirty-Fifth General Election (Report). Elections Nova Scotia.

=== 1998 ===
1998 Nova Scotia general election
Party	Candidate	Votes	%	±%
New Democratic	Charlie Parker	3,306	40.26	27.82
Progressive Conservative	Luke Young	3,273	39.86	-5.86
Liberal	Rob McDowell	1,633	19.89	-18.07
Total valid votes		8,212	99.50	–
Total rejected ballots		41	0.50	+0.03
Turnout		8,253	76.32	-3.94
Eligible voters		10,813		
New Democratic gain from Progressive Conservative		Swing		+16.84
Source(s) Source: Nova Scotia Legislature (2024). "Electoral History for Pictou West" (PDF). nslegislature.ca.

=== 1993 ===
1993 Nova Scotia general election
Party	Candidate	Votes	%	±%
Progressive Conservative	Donald P. McInnes	4,032	45.72	-9.02
Liberal	Rob McDowell	3,347	37.95	5.34
New Democratic	Malcolm Campbell	1,097	12.44	-0.21
Independent	Edward MacMaster	343	3.89	–
Total		8,819	–	
Source(s) Source: Nova Scotia Legislature (2024). "Electoral History for Pictou West" (PDF). nslegislature.ca. Nova Scotia, Chief Electoral Officer (1993). Returns of the General Election for the House of Assembly, Thirty-Third General Election (PDF) (Report). Queen's Printer. Archived from the original (PDF) on 18 June 2018.

=== 1988 ===
1988 Nova Scotia general election
Party	Candidate	Votes	%	±%
Progressive Conservative	Donald P. McInnes	3,824	54.74	-5.04
Liberal	John J. Henderson	2,278	32.61	2.56
New Democratic	Geoff Moore	884	12.65	5.10
Total		6,986	–	
Source(s) Source: Nova Scotia Legislature (2024). "Electoral History for Pictou West" (PDF). nslegislature.ca. Nova Scotia, Chief Electoral Officer (1988). Returns of the General Election for the House of Assembly, Thirty-Second General Election (PDF) (Report). Queen's Printer. Archived from the original (PDF) on 7 July 2018.

=== 1984 ===
1984 Nova Scotia general election
Party	Candidate	Votes	%	±%
Progressive Conservative	Donald P. McInnes	3,844	59.78	6.54
Liberal	Bob Naylor	1,932	30.05	-1.63
New Democratic	Lynn Curwin-Porteous	486	7.56	-3.20
Independent	Franklin R. Fiske	168	2.61	–
Total		6,430	–	
Source(s) Source: Nova Scotia Legislature (2024). "Electoral History for Pictou West" (PDF). nslegislature.ca. Nova Scotia, Chief Electoral Officer (1984). Returns of the General Election for the House of Assembly, Thirty-First General Election (PDF) (Report). Queen's Printer. Archived from the original (PDF) on 31 July 2017.

=== 1981 ===
1981 Nova Scotia general election
Party	Candidate	Votes	%	±%
Progressive Conservative	Donald P. McInnes	3,473	53.24	10.36
Liberal	Doris Rink	2,066	31.67	-8.94
New Democratic	Jim Scanlan	702	10.76	-4.79
Independent	Franklin Robert Fiske	282	4.32	–
Total		6,523	–	
Source(s) Source: Nova Scotia Legislature (2024). "Electoral History for Pictou West" (PDF). nslegislature.ca. Nova Scotia, Chief Electoral Officer (1981). Returns of the General Election for the House of Assembly, Thirtieth General Election (PDF) (Report). Queen's Printer. Archived from the original (PDF) on 31 July 2017.

=== 1978 ===
1978 Nova Scotia general election
Party	Candidate	Votes	%	±%
Progressive Conservative	Donald P. McInnes	2,888	42.89	-0.73
Liberal	Dan Reid	2,735	40.61	-3.38
New Democratic	John McDonald	1,047	15.55	3.16
Independent	Lloyd H. MacLellan	64	0.95	–
Total		6,734	–	
Source(s) Source: Nova Scotia Legislature (2024). "Electoral History for Pictou West" (PDF). nslegislature.ca. Nova Scotia, Chief Electoral Officer (1978). Returns of the General Election for the House of Assembly, Twenty-Ninth General Election (PDF) (Report). Queen's Printer. Archived from the original (PDF) on 18 June 2018.

=== 1974 ===
1974 Nova Scotia general election
Party	Candidate	Votes	%	±%
Liberal	Dan Reid	2,624	43.99	6.46
Progressive Conservative	Harvey Veniot	2,602	43.62	-7.38
New Democratic	Charles Parker	739	12.39	0.91
Total		5,965	–	
Source(s) Source: Nova Scotia Legislature (2024). "Electoral History for Pictou West" (PDF). nslegislature.ca. Nova Scotia, Chief Electoral Officer (1974). Returns of the General Election for the House of Assembly, Twenty-Eighth General Election (PDF) (Report). Queen's Printer. Archived from the original (PDF) on 18 June 2018.

=== 1970 ===
1970 Nova Scotia general election
Party	Candidate	Votes	%	±%
Progressive Conservative	Harvey Veniot	2,729	51.00	-14.20
Liberal	Mawhinney D. Laurence	2,008	37.53	2.73
New Democratic	Robert Cormier	614	11.47	–
Total		5,351	–	
Source(s) Source: Nova Scotia Legislature (2024). "Electoral History for Pictou West" (PDF). nslegislature.ca. Nova Scotia, Legislative Assembly (1970). Returns of the General Election for the House of Assembly, 1970 (PDF) (Report). Queen's Printer. Archived from the original (PDF) on 25 July 2018.

=== 1967 ===
1967 Nova Scotia general election
Party	Candidate	Votes	%	±%
Progressive Conservative	Harvey Veniot	3,137	65.20	5.67
Liberal	Edward Snow	1,674	34.80	-5.67
Total		4,811	–	
Source(s) Source: Nova Scotia Legislature (2024). "Electoral History for Pictou West" (PDF). nslegislature.ca. Nova Scotia Legislature (1967). Returns of the General Election for the House of Assembly (PDF) (Report). Queen's Printer. Archived from the original (PDF) on 25 July 2018.

=== 1963 ===
1963 Nova Scotia general election
Party	Candidate	Votes	%	±%
Progressive Conservative	Harvey Veniot	2,999	59.54	7.26
Liberal	Charles Ernest MacCarthy	2,038	40.46	-4.37
Total		5,037	–	
Source(s) Source: Nova Scotia Legislature (2024). "Electoral History for Pictou West" (PDF). nslegislature.ca. Nova Scotia Legislature (1963). Returns of the General Election for the House of Assembly (PDF) (Report). Queen's Printer. Archived from the original (PDF) on 25 July 2018.

=== 1960 ===
1960 Nova Scotia general election
Party	Candidate	Votes	%	±%
Progressive Conservative	Harvey Veniot	2,744	52.28	1.43
Liberal	W. A. Brody	2,353	44.83	-4.33
Co-operative Commonwealth	W. E. Salsman	152	2.90	–
Total		5,249	–	
Source(s) Source: Nova Scotia Legislature (2024). "Electoral History for Pictou West" (PDF). nslegislature.ca. Nova Scotia Legislature (1960). Returns of the General Election for the House of Assembly (PDF) (Report). Queen's Printer. Archived from the original (PDF) on 25 July 2018.

=== 1956 ===
1956 Nova Scotia general election
Party	Candidate	Votes	%	±%
Progressive Conservative	Harvey Veniot	2,644	50.85	0.93
Liberal	Stewart W. Proudfoot	2,556	49.15	-0.93
Total		5,200	–	
Source(s) Source: Nova Scotia Legislature (2024). "Electoral History for Pictou West" (PDF). nslegislature.ca. Nova Scotia Legislature (1956). Returns of the General Election for the House of Assembly (PDF) (Report). Queen's Printer. Archived from the original (PDF) on 10 September 2018.

=== 1953 ===
1953 Nova Scotia general election
Party	Candidate	Votes	%	±%
Liberal	Stewart W. Proudfoot	2,628	50.09	-4.96
Progressive Conservative	Harvey Veniot	2,619	49.91	4.96
Total		5,247	–	
Source(s) Source: Nova Scotia Legislature (2024). "Electoral History for Pictou West" (PDF). nslegislature.ca. Nova Scotia Legislature (1953). Returns of the General Election for the House of Assembly (PDF) (Report). Queen's Printer. Archived from the original (PDF) on 10 September 2018.

=== 1949 ===
1949 Nova Scotia general election
Party	Candidate	Votes	%	±%
Liberal	Stewart W. Proudfoot	2,817	55.04	–
Progressive Conservative	Donald R. Gilchrist	2,301	44.96	–
Total		5,118	–	
Source(s) Source: Nova Scotia Legislature (2024). "Electoral History for Pictou West" (PDF). nslegislature.ca. Nova Scotia Legislature (1949). Returns of the General Election for the House of Assembly (PDF) (Report). Queen's Printer. Archived from the original (PDF) on 10 September 2018.

== See also ==
- List of Nova Scotia provincial electoral districts
- Canadian provincial electoral districts
