= East River of Pictou =

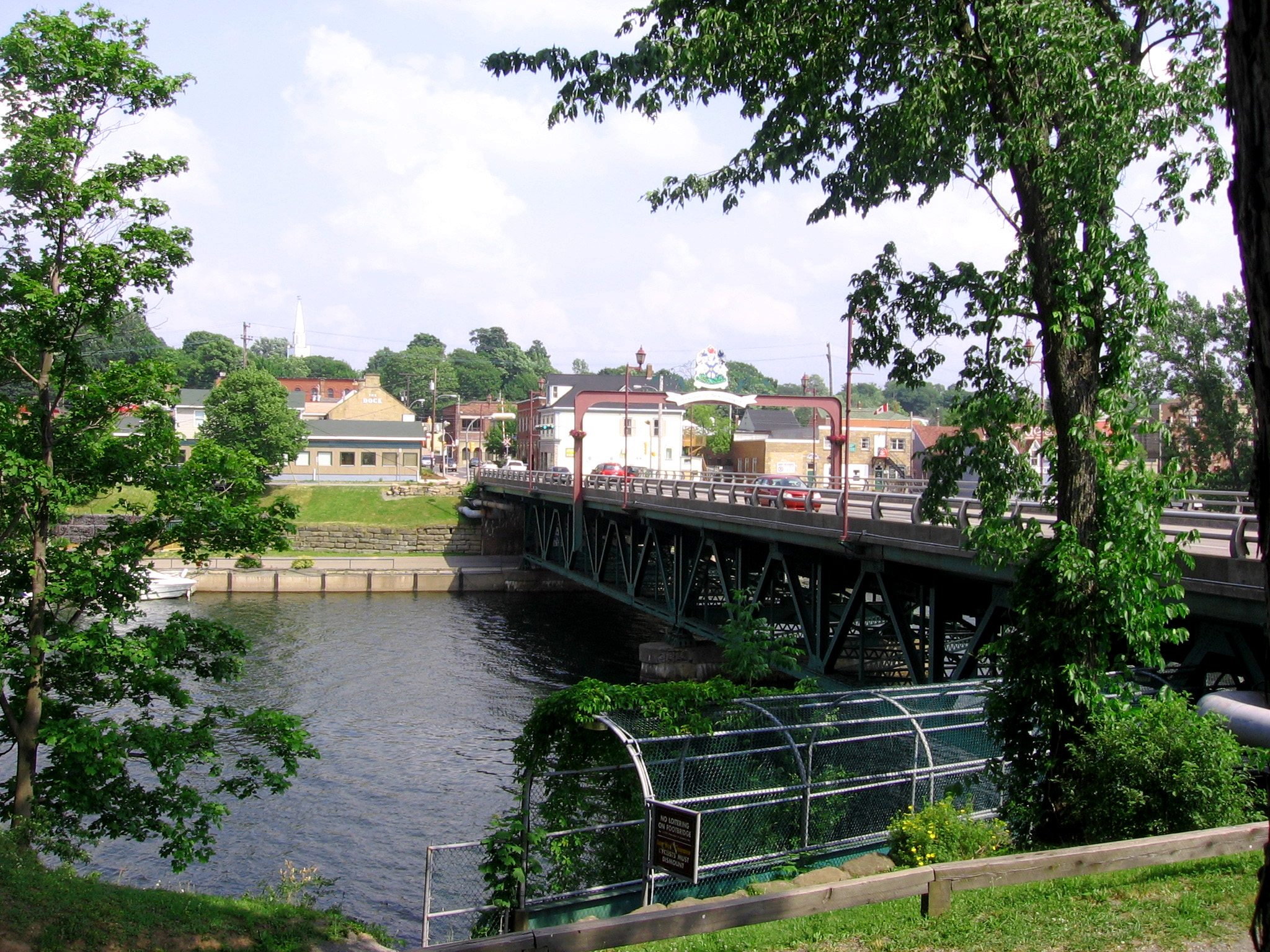
- Bridge across the East River at New Glasgow

Location
- Country: Canada
- Province: Nova Scotia

Physical characteristics
- Mouth
  - location: Pictou Harbour (sub-basin of Northumberland Strait
  - coordinates: 45°39′38″N 62°42′15″W
  - elevation: sea level
- Length: 57 km (35 mi)
- Basin size: 547 km^{2} (211 sq mi)

The East River of Pictou is a Canadian river located in Pictou County, Nova Scotia.

The river has a meander length of approximately 57 km (35 mi) and a watershed having an area of approximately 547 km^{2} (211 sq mi). It rises at Hunters Lake in the community of Eden Lake. It discharges into Pictou Harbour which is a sub-basin of the Northumberland Strait. It is an estuary for approximately 12 km (7.5 mi) from Pictou Harbour to New Glasgow and is currently navigable for small pleasure craft for approximately 10 km (6.2 mi).

The majority of the watershed is heavily forested. The lower valley, running approximately 20 km (12 mi) from Pictou Harbour experiences the majority of human impact.

The valley is tied to Nova Scotia's, and Canada's, earliest industrial activity since the discovery in 1798 of what is now known as the Pictou Coalfield in the Carboniferous Stellarton Basin. Large-scale underground coal mining commenced along the river valley in 1827 under the General Mining Association and lasted until the explosion at the Westray Mine in 1992; small scale open pit mining has continued since 1992. The nation's first steel fabrication facility was founded in 1872 in Trenton, spurred in part by the availability of local coal and partly by the transportation opportunities provided by the navigable portion of the river and the arrival in 1867 of the Nova Scotia Railway.

== Communities ==
(from source to mouth)

- Eden Lake
- Kerrowgare
- Sunny Brae
- Iron Rock
- Glencoe
- St. Pauls
- Bridgeville
- Springville
- Island East River
- Eureka
- Churchville
- Riverton
- Plymouth
- Stellarton
- New Glasgow
- Trenton
- Abercrombie
- Hillside
- Pictou Landing

== See also ==
- List of rivers of Nova Scotia
