= Nova Scotia Route 348 =

Highway in Nova Scotia, Canada

Route 348

Route information
- Maintained by Nova Scotia Department of Transportation and Infrastructure Renewal
- Length: 101 km (63 mi)

Major junctions
- South end: Trunk 7 in Melrose
- Hwy 104 (TCH) / Trunk 4 / Route 289 in New Glasgow
- North end: Route 289 in Little Harbour

Location
- Country: Canada
- Province: Nova Scotia

Highway system
- Provincial highways in Nova Scotia; 100-series
← Route 347	→ Route 349

Route 348 is a collector road in the Canadian province of Nova Scotia.

It is located in the northeastern part of the province and connects Little Harbour at Route 289 with Melrose at Trunk 7.

In the town of Trenton it runs on "North Main Street," "Main Street" and "Trenton Road." In the neighbouring town of New Glasgow it runs on "North Provost Street," "Provost Street" and "Jury Street" (southbound), "Archimedes Street" (northbound), and the "East River Road."

== Communities ==
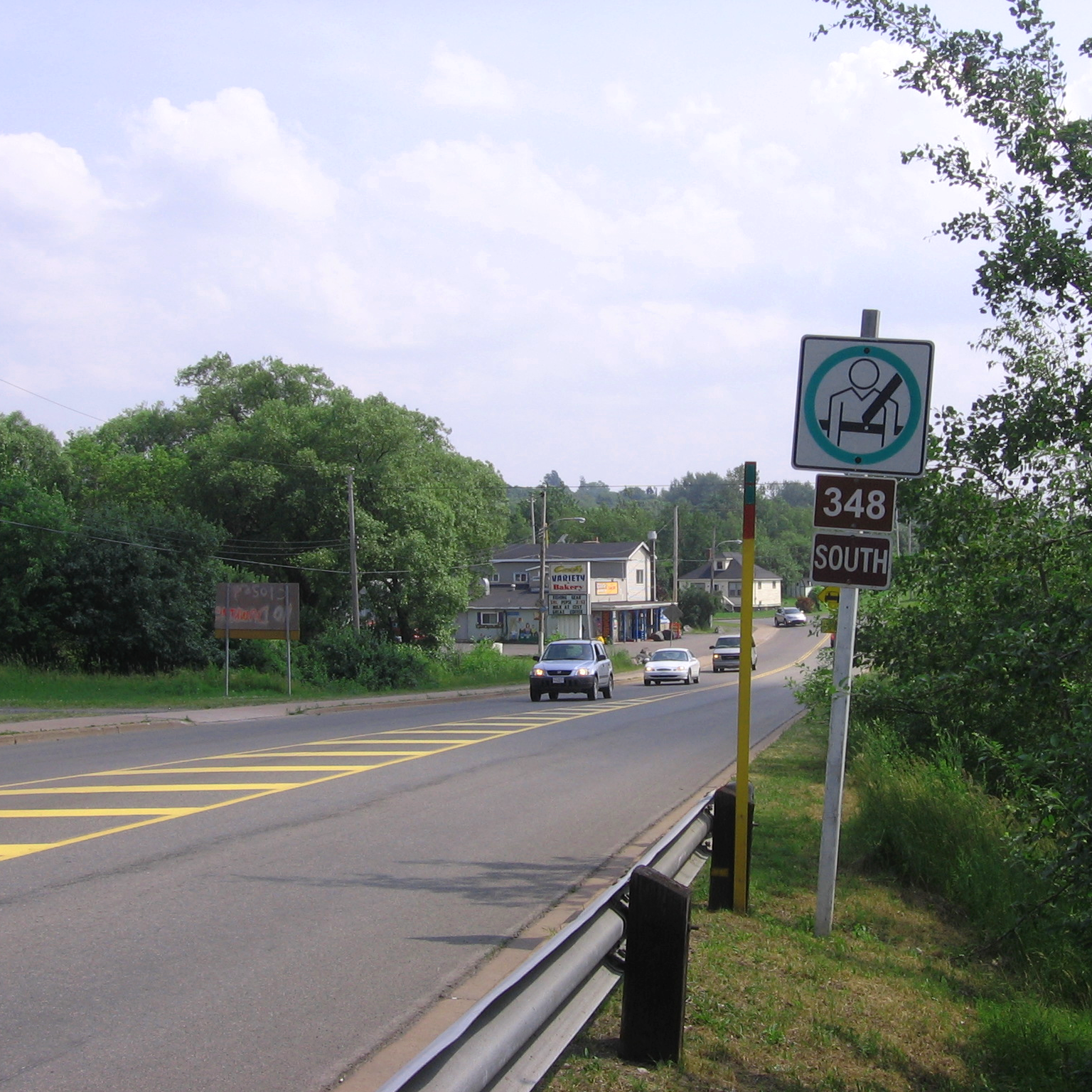
Nova Scotia Route 348 in Trenton. It is known as Main Street in this town.

- Little Harbour
- Chance Harbour
- Pictou Landing
- Boat Harbour West 37
- Hillside
- Trenton
- New Glasgow
- Plymouth
- Churchville
- Springville
- Bridgeville
- St. Pauls
- Glencoe
- Iron Rock
- Sunnybrae
- Caledonia
- Lower Caledonia
- Upper Smithfield
- Smithfield
- Glenelg
- Melrose

== See also ==
- List of Nova Scotia provincial highways
