= Middle River of Pictou =

Location
- Country: Canada
- Province: Nova Scotia

Physical characteristics
- Mouth
  - location: Pictou Harbour (sub-basin of Northumberland Strait
  - coordinates: 45°39′23″N 62°43′57″W
  - elevation: sea level
- Length: 37 km (23 mi)
- Basin size: 213 km^{2} (82 sq mi)

The Middle River of Pictou is a Canadian river located in Pictou County, Nova Scotia.

The river has a meander length of approximately 37 km (23 mi) and a watershed having an area of approximately 213 km^{2} (82 sq mi). It rises at Dryden Lake in the community of Glengarry Station. It discharges into Pictou Harbour which is a sub-basin of the Northumberland Strait. Historically, until 1969, it was an estuary for approximately 8.5 km (5.3 mi) from Pictou Harbour to Alma; since then only the lower 2.5 km (1.6 mi) remains as an estuary.

The valley is tied to Nova Scotia's, and Canada's, earliest industrial activity since the discovery in 1798 of what is now known as the Pictou Coalfield in the Carboniferous Stellarton Basin. Large-scale underground coal mining commenced in the nearby East River of Pictou river valley in 1827 under the General Mining Association and lasted until the explosion at the Westray Mine in 1992; small scale open pit mining has continued since 1992.

The community of "Acadia Mine" which was later renamed as the town of Westville experienced coal mining from the 1860s-1970s, entirely within the watershed of the Middle River of Pictou. Historically, two coal mining companies operated coal shipment piers on the Middle River of Pictou until the early to mid-20th century. One pier was located near the head of navigation in the southern part of Granton along the east bank of the river. The other pier was located at the mouth of the river at Abercrombie Point in the northern part of Abercrombie. Both piers were served by railway lines and hauled coal from mines in Westville.

The river experienced significant changes in the late 1960s due to industrial development and construction of transportation infrastructure. In 1965 the Government of Nova Scotia under the leadership of Premier Robert Stanfield passed the Scott Maritimes Limited Agreement (1965) Act in the Nova Scotia House of Assembly. This legislation included an agreement whereby the Government of Nova Scotia, beginning in 1967, would provide to a pulp mill to be located at Abercrombie a minimum of 25,000,000 imp gal (110,000 m^{3}) per day. To meet this requirement, the provincial government constructed a rock fill dam across the estuarine portion of the Middle River of Pictou at a location between Loch Broom and Granton, creating a reservoir with an area of approximately 6 km^{2} (2.3 sq mi) and a depth of approximately 5 m (16 ft). The flooding of the reservoir also required the realignment of 6 km (3.7 mi) of the CN Rail line running between Stellarton and Oxford Junction, including the abandonment of several properties in the community of Sylvester. The rail line was realigned to cross the Middle River of Pictou on the reservoir's dam and remained in operation until freight rail traffic ceased in 1986.

The other major change to the Middle River of Pictou, as well as the West River of Pictou and the western portion of Pictou Harbour was the construction in 1968 of a rock fill causeway and tidal sluice gates across the harbour between Abercrombie Point in the south and Brown's Point in the north. This causeway carries Nova Scotia Highway 106 and is named the "Harvey A. Veniot Causeway" in honour of local politician Harvey Veniot. The causeway has proven controversial as in addition to limiting the exchange of water in the harbour, it has significantly reduced the navigable portion of Pictou Harbour.

The majority of the watershed of the Middle River of Pictou is heavily forested. A section measuring approximately 8 km (5.0 mi) in length through the communities of Union Centre and Rocklin has some cleared land for small family farms.

== Communities ==
(from source to mouth)

- Glengarry Station
- Concord
- Rocklin
- Union Centre
- Pleasant Valley
- Hamilton Road
- Westville
- Alma
- Sylvester
- Granton
- Loch Broom
- Abercrombie

== See also ==
- List of rivers of Nova Scotia
