= Denver (disambiguation) =

Denver is the capital of the U.S. state of Colorado.

Denver may also refer to:

== Places ==
- Denver, Victoria, a locality in Australia
- Denver, Nova Scotia, a village in Canada
- Denver, Norfolk, a village and civil parish in the United Kingdom
- Denver, Johannesburg, a suburb of Johannesburg, South Africa

=== United States ===
- Denver Basin, a geologic basin in eastern Colorado
- Denver, Illinois, an unincorporated community
- Denver Township, Richland County, Illinois
- Denver, Indiana, a town
- Denver, Iowa, a city
- Denver, Kentucky, an unincorporated community
- Denver Township, Isabella County, Michigan
- Denver Township, Newaygo County, Michigan
- Denver Township, Rock County, Minnesota
- Denver, Missouri, a village
- Denver Township, Adams County, Nebraska
- Denver, North Carolina, a census-designated place and unincorporated community
- Denver, Ross County, Ohio, an unincorporated community
- Denver, Wood County, Ohio, an unincorporated community
- Denver, Pennsylvania, a borough
- Denver City, Texas, a town
- Denver, West Virginia, an unincorporated community

== Schools ==
- Denver Academy, a private day school in Denver, Colorado
- Denver School of the Arts, a pioneering magnet school in Denver, Colorado
- Denver School of Science and Technology, a public charter school in Denver, Colorado
- Denver Seminary, an accredited, graduate-level institution in Littleton, Colorado
- University of Denver, a private university in Denver, Colorado

== Ships ==
- Denver-class cruiser, a US Navy class of protected cruisers
- USS Denver (CL-16), a cruiser commissioned in 1904
- USS Denver (CL-58), a light cruiser commissioned 1942
- USS Denver (LPD-9), an amphibious transport dock commissioned in 1968

== Sports ==
- Denver Broncos, a National Football League team based in Denver, Colorado
- Denver Nuggets, a National Basketball Association team based in Denver, Colorado
- Denver Bears (Western League), a former minor league baseball team based in Denver, Colorado
- Denver Outlaws, a professional men's field lacrosse team based in Denver, Colorado
- Denver Pioneers, the sports teams of the University of Denver
- Denver Zephyrs (formerly the Denver Bears), a former Minor League Baseball team based in Denver, Colorado

== Other uses ==
- Denver (name), a list of people with the surname or given name
- Denver omelette or Western omelette
- Denver sandwich or Western sandwich
- Dënver, a Chilean pop duo
- "Denver" (song), by Larry Gatlin & the Gatlin Brothers Band
- Duke of Denver, a fictional English title of nobility in the Lord Peter Wimsey books by Dorothy Sayers
- Denver, the title character of the cartoon Denver, the Last Dinosaur
- Roman Catholic Archdiocese of Denver, Denver, Colorado
- Denver International Airport, serving Denver, Colorado
- Denver Health (hospital), formerly named Denver General Hospital, Denver, Colorado
- Denver Windmill, listed windmill in England
- Project Denver, codename of a computer microarchitecture designed by Nvidia
- The Denver Dry Goods Company or The Denver, a defunct company in Denver, Colorado
- Denver railway station (England), a railway station in Denver, England

== See also ==
- Dapper Denver Dooley, a Walter Lantz cartoon character and Woody Woodpecker's rival
- Denver boot, a wheel clamp for immobilizing vehicles
- Denver tool, a multi-purpose tool used to gain forcible entry in emergencies
- Metropolitan State University of Denver (MSU Denver), a public university in Denver, Colorado
- University of Colorado Denver (CU Denver), a public research university in Denver, Colorado
- Denver Developmental Screening Test or Denver Scale, a developmental screening exam for children
