= Nova Scotia Route 289 =

Highway in Nova Scotia, Canada

Route 289

Route information
- Maintained by Nova Scotia Department of Transportation and Infrastructure Renewal
- Length: 98 km (61 mi)

Major junctions
- West end: Route 236 in Green Oaks
- Hwy 102 / Trunk 2 in Brookfield; Route 336 in Springside; Hwy 104 (TCH) / Route 348 / Route 374 in New Glasgow
- East end: Route 348 in Little Harbour

Location
- Country: Canada
- Province: Nova Scotia
- Counties: Colchester / Pictou

Highway system
- Provincial highways in Nova Scotia; 100-series
← Route 277	→ Route 301

Route 289 is a collector road in the Canadian province of Nova Scotia.

It is located in the northern and central part of the province, connecting Melmerby Beach Provincial Park in Kings Head with Route 236 near Green Oaks.

== Communities ==
- Green Oaks (approximate terminus)
- Pleasant Valley
- Brookfield
- Middle Stewiacke
- Halfway Brook
- Otter Brook
- Upper Stewiacke
- Stewiacke Cross Roads
- Springside
- Sheepherders Junction
- Lansdowne
- New Lairg
- Rocklin
- Union Centre
- Hazel Glen
- Westville
- New Glasgow
- Academy
- Little Harbour Road
- Little Harbour
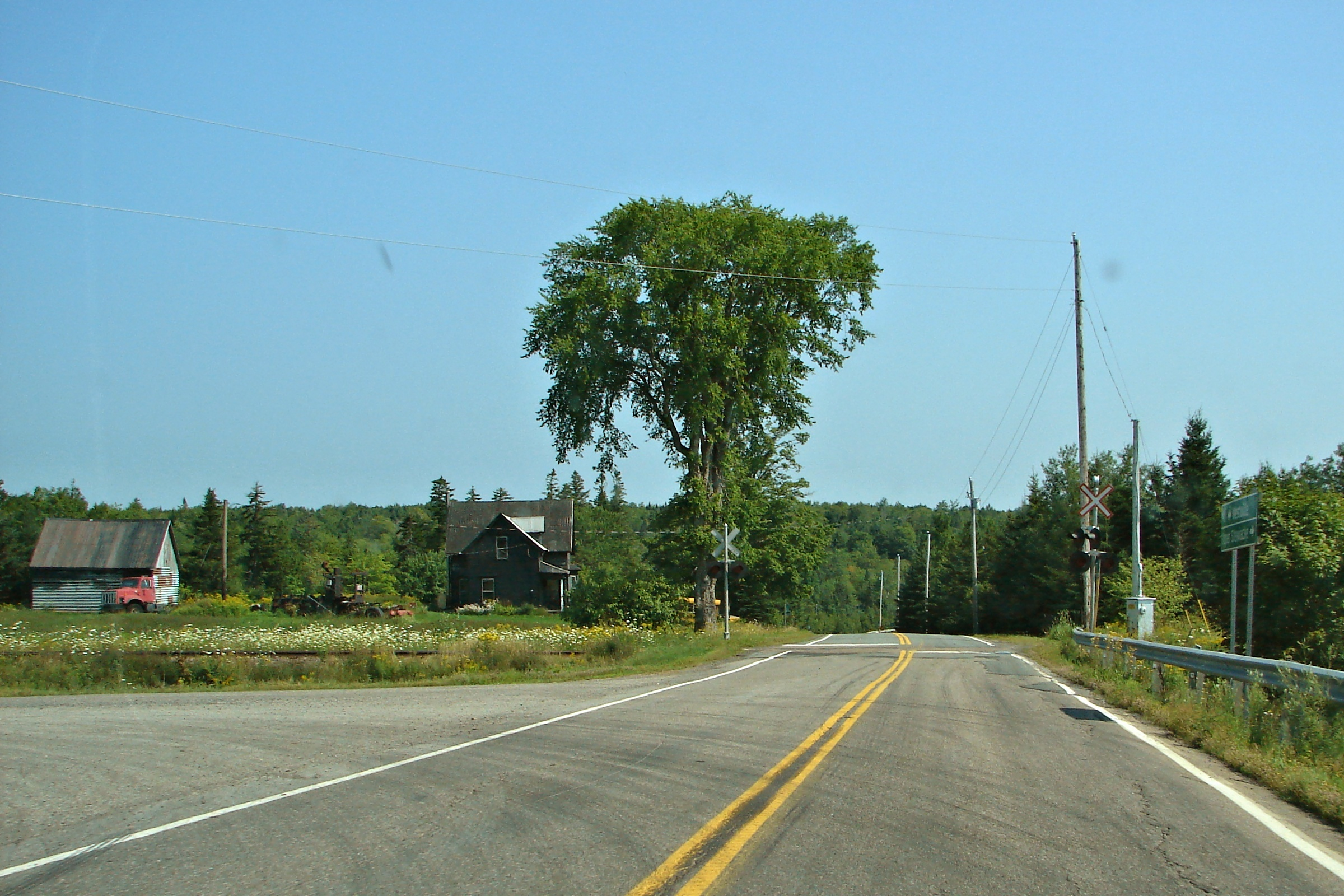
Route 289 at Lansdowne

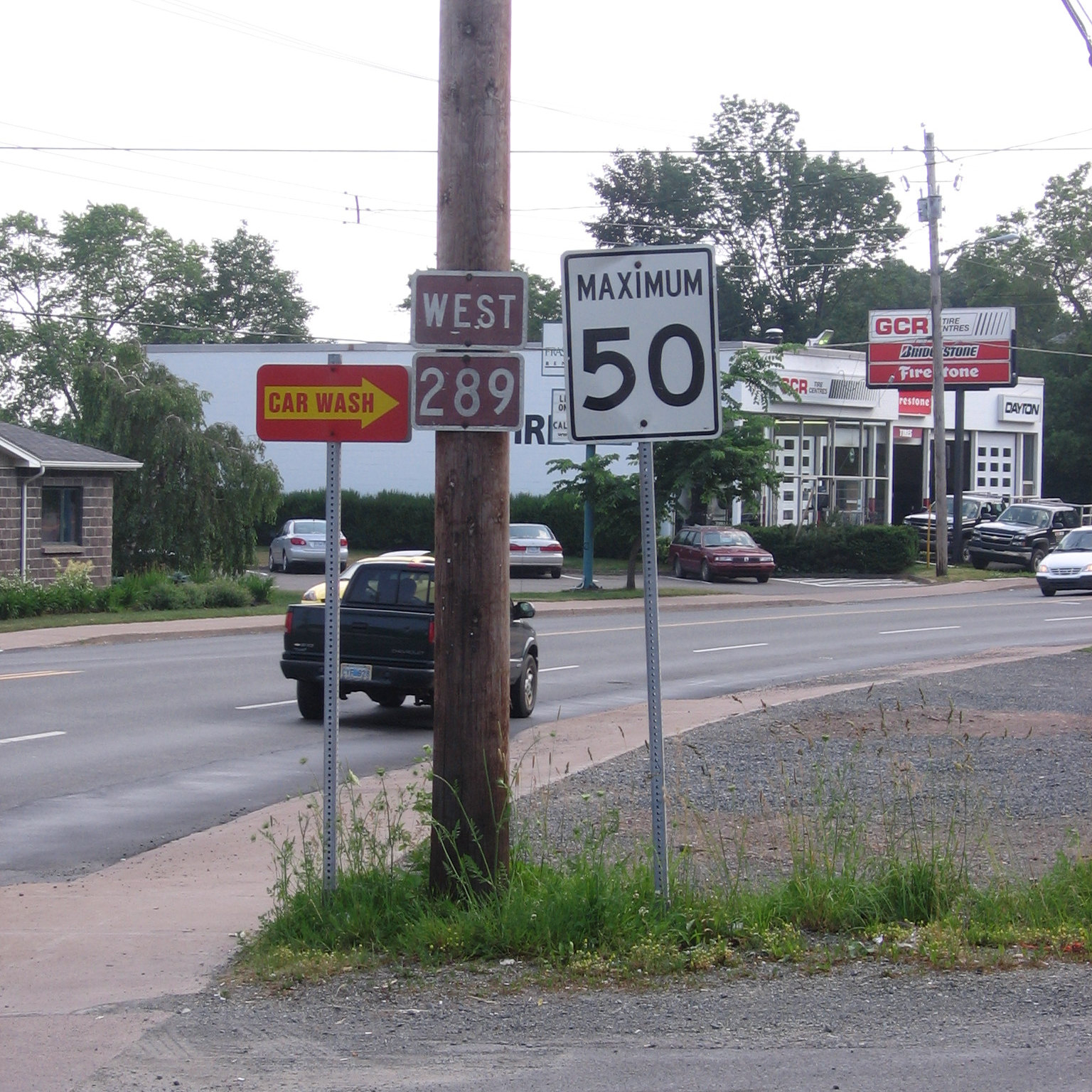
Route 289 in the area of Stellarton Road in New Glasgow. It shares the same route as Nova Scotia Trunk 4 on the west side of New Glasgow.

== See also ==
- List of Nova Scotia provincial highways
