= Denver Township =

Denver Township may refer to the following places in the United States:

- Denver Township, Richland County, Illinois
- Denver Township, Isabella County, Michigan
- Denver Township, Newaygo County, Michigan
- Denver Township, Rock County, Minnesota
- Denver Township, Adams County, Nebraska

== See also ==
- Denver (disambiguation)
