= Charlie Parker (Nova Scotia politician) =

Canadian politician

The Honourable Charlie Parker

Member of the Nova Scotia House of Assembly for Pictou West
- In office August 5, 2003 – October 8, 2013
- Preceded by: Muriel Baillie
- Succeeded by: Karla MacFarlane
- In office March 24, 1998 – July 27, 1999
- Preceded by: Don McInnes
- Succeeded by: Muriel Baillie

Speaker of the House of Assembly of Nova Scotia
- In office June 25, 2009 – January 11, 2011
- Preceded by: Alfie MacLeod
- Succeeded by: Gordie Gosse

Minister of Natural Resources
- In office January 11, 2011 – October 22, 2013
- Preceded by: John MacDonell
- Succeeded by: Zach Churchill

Personal details
- Born: 1951 (age 74–75) Durham, Nova Scotia
- Party: NDP
- Occupation: educator

Charles Lewis Parker is a Canadian former educator and politician who represented the constituency of Pictou West in the Nova Scotia House of Assembly from 1998 to 1999, and from 2003 to 2013. He sat as a member of the Nova Scotia New Democratic Party.

Parker was born and raised on his family's farm in Durham. A graduate of West Pictou District High School, Parker is a graduate of the Nova Scotia Teachers College and he also graduated from Acadia University with a BSc. Parker worked as a public school teacher as well as owning and operating a garden centre/nursery and was a realtor. Parker lives in Loch Broom and is married with two children.

== Political career ==
Parker began his public service as a municipal councillor for the Municipality of the County of Pictou where he served four terms.

In 1998 Parker successfully ran for the Nova Scotia New Democratic Party nomination in the riding of Pictou West. He was elected in the 1998 provincial election by a margin of 33 votes (40.3% of votes cast).

Parker lost in the 1999 provincial election by a margin of 147 votes (35.69% of votes cast).

In the 2003 provincial election Parker re-offered with the NDP in Pictou West and was elected with 44.05% of the vote, by a margin of 880 votes. Parker was re-elected in the 2006 provincial election with 54.89%, increasing his margin to 1,589 votes. While a member of the official opposition, Parker served as the critic for Natural Resources. He also served as Chair of the Standing Committee on Private and Local Bills and sat on the Legislature's Human Resources Committee.

Parker was re-elected in the 2009 provincial election which saw the Nova Scotia NDP win a majority of seats. Parker was elected in the fall sitting of the legislature as Speaker of the House of Assembly. He resigned this post in January 2011 after being offered a cabinet position, having been appointed to the Executive Council of Nova Scotia where he served as Minister of Natural Resources as well as Minister of Energy.

Parker lost his seat in the 2013 provincial election.
