= Nova Scotia Highway 106 =

Highway in Nova Scotia

Highway 106
- Route Transcanadienne
- Jubilee Highway; Trans-Canada Highway
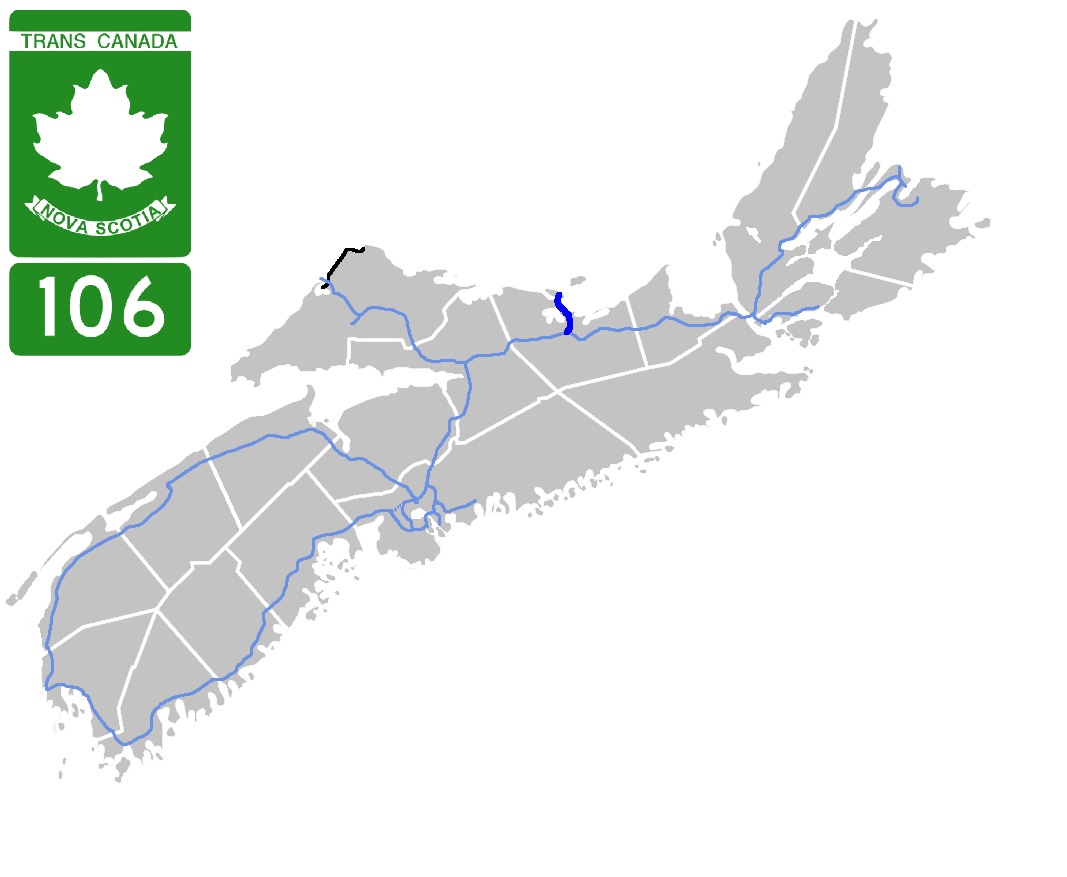

Route information
- Maintained by Department of Transportation and Infrastructure Renewal
- Length: 19.38 km (12.04 mi)

Major junctions
- South end: Hwy 104 (TCH) near New Glasgow
- Trunk 6 / Route 376 at Pictou
- North end: Northumberland Ferries terminal in Caribou continues as Route 1 (TCH) in Prince Edward Island

Location
- Country: Canada
- Province: Nova Scotia

Highway system
- Trans-Canada Highway; Provincial highways in Nova Scotia; 100-series
← Hwy 105 (TCH)	→ Hwy 107

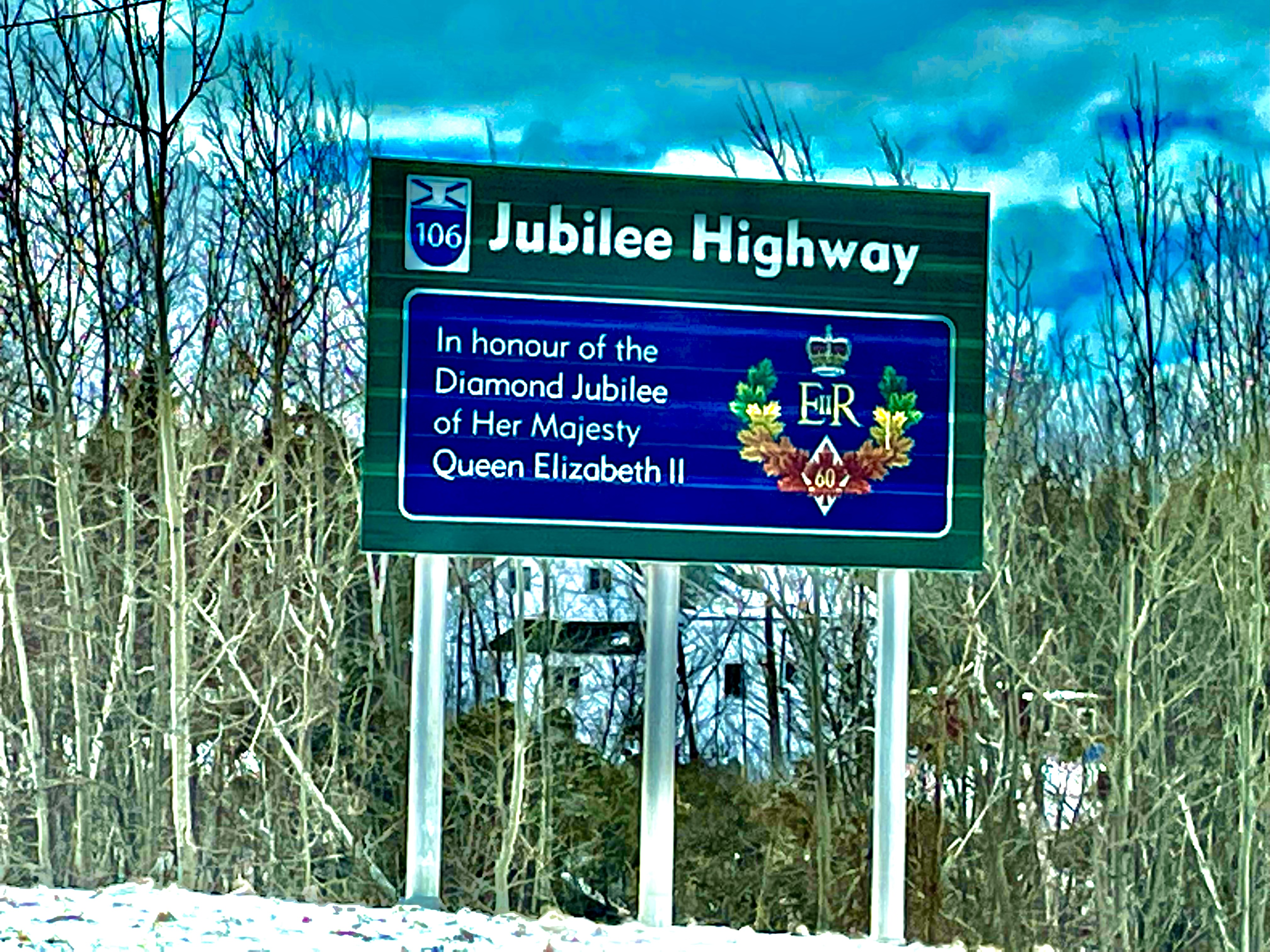
The sign at the northern terminus of the Jubilee Highway (Nova Scotia Highway 106) at the Northumberland Ferries terminal in Caribou

Highway 106 is a 19 km (12 mi) 2-lane limited-access highway located within Pictou County, in the Canadian province of Nova Scotia. The provincial government named the highway the Jubilee Highway on December 21, 2012 in honour of Queen Elizabeth II's Diamond Jubilee.

The highway is part of the Prince Edward Island loop of the Trans-Canada Highway and connects the Northumberland Ferries terminal in Caribou in the north with the mainline Trans-Canada at Highway 104 near Mount William in the south, 3 kilometres (2 mi) east of New Glasgow.

== Route description ==
Highway 106 begins at a trumpet interchange with Highway 104. The route bypasses to the west side of New Glasgow by running along the centre of Abercrombie Point. It crosses Pictou Harbour to the town of Pictou using the Harvey A. Veniot Causeway, which opened in 1968. A traffic circle at the west end of Pictou, known as the Pictou Rotary, connects Highway 106 with the centre of town as well as Trunk 6 (the Sunrise Trail) and Route 376. The route is a super two expressway except for a short section of at-grade two lane highway near the northern terminus. The route ends in Caribou at the Northumberland Ferries terminal to Prince Edward Island, where the Trans-Canada Highway designation continues as Prince Edward Island Highway 1.

== Major intersections ==
The entire route is in Pictou County.

Location	km	mi	Exit	Destinations	Notes
	0.0	0.0	1	Hwy 104 (TCH) – New Glasgow, Cape Breton Island, Westville, Truro	Signed as exits 1E (east) and 1W (west)
Mount William	1.3	0.81	1A	Abercrombie, Trenton	
	6.6	4.1	2	Granton, Abercrombie	
Pictou	8.6– 10.2	5.3– 6.3	Harvey Veniot Causeway crosses Pictou Harbour		
Pictou	11.7– 12.1	7.3– 7.5	3A	West River Road – Pictou	Pictou Rotary; Signed as exits 3B (to Hwy 106 north) and 3E (to Hwy 106 south)
Pictou	11.7– 12.1	7.3– 7.5	3C	Trunk 6 west (Sunrise Trail) – River John, Tatamagouche, Amherst	Pictou Rotary; Signed as exits 3B (to Hwy 106 north) and 3E (to Hwy 106 south)
Pictou	11.7– 12.1	7.3– 7.5	3D	Route 376 south to Route 256 – Lyons Brook, Durham	Pictou Rotary; Signed as exits 3B (to Hwy 106 north) and 3E (to Hwy 106 south)
Caribou	19.4	12.1	Caribou Ferry Terminal		
Northumberland Strait			Northumberland Ferries Limited ferry to Wood Islands, PEI		
Northumberland Strait			—	Route 1 (TCH) west – Charlottetown	Continues in Prince Edward Island
1.000 mi = 1.609 km; 1.000 km = 0.621 mi: Tolled; Note: Exit numbers in Nova Scotia are sequential.

== See also ==
- Royal eponyms in Canada

Trans-Canada Highway
Previous route PE Route 1	Highway 106	Next route Highway 104
