= Denver Township, Michigan =

Denver Township is the name of some places in the U.S. state of Michigan:

- Denver Township, Isabella County, Michigan
- Denver Township, Newaygo County, Michigan

== See also ==
- Denver Township (disambiguation)
