= Sunnybrae =

Sunnybrae may refer to:

- Australia:
  - Sunnybrae Farm Complex, a heritage site on the former Islington Sewage Farm in Regency Park, South Australia
  - Sunnybrae, a town in Peterborough District, South Australia
- Canada:
  - Sunnybrae, Nova Scotia, a community in Pictou County
  - Sunnybrae Provincial Park, a protected area in British Columbia
  - Sunnybrae, a community within the municipality of Trent Hills, Ontario
  - Sunnybrae Public School, a school in Simcoe County, Ontario
- New Zealand:
  - Sunnybrae Normal School in Hillcrest, Auckland

== See also ==
- Sunny Brae (disambiguation)
