= Stewart W. Proudfoot =

Canadian politician (1908–1986)

MLA for Pictou West
- In office 1949–1956
- Preceded by: new riding
- Succeeded by: Harvey Veniot

Personal details
- Born: Stewart William Proudfoot; July 31, 1908 Scotsburn, Nova Scotia
- Died: June 26, 1986 (aged 77) New Glasgow, Nova Scotia
- Party: Liberal
- Occupation: merchant

Stewart William Proudfoot (July 31, 1908 – June 26, 1986) was a Canadian politician. He represented the electoral district of Pictou West in the Nova Scotia House of Assembly from 1949 to 1956. He was a member of the Nova Scotia Liberal Party.

Proudfoot was born in 1908 at Scotsburn, Pictou County, Nova Scotia. He married Helen Elizabeth MacLean in 1937, and was a merchant by career. Proudfoot entered provincial politics in the 1949 election, winning the newly established Pictou West riding. He was re-elected in the 1953 election, defeating Progressive Conservative Harvey Veniot by 9 votes. Proudfoot was defeated when he ran for re-election in 1956, losing to Veniot by 88 votes. Proudfoot died in 1986.
