= Plymouth, Nova Scotia =

Plymouth, Nova Scotia may refer to:

- Plymouth, Pictou County, Nova Scotia
- Plymouth, Yarmouth County, Nova Scotia
