= Sunny Brae =

Sunny Brae may refer to:

- Sunny Brae, California, an unincorporated community in Humboldt County
- Sunny Brae, New Brunswick, a neighbourhood in Canada
- Sunny Brae, Nova Scotia, a community in Canada

== See also ==
- Sunnybrae (disambiguation)
