= Pictou Harbour =

Natural harbour in Nova Scotia; its geography and history

Coordinates: 45.6694°N 62.7035°W

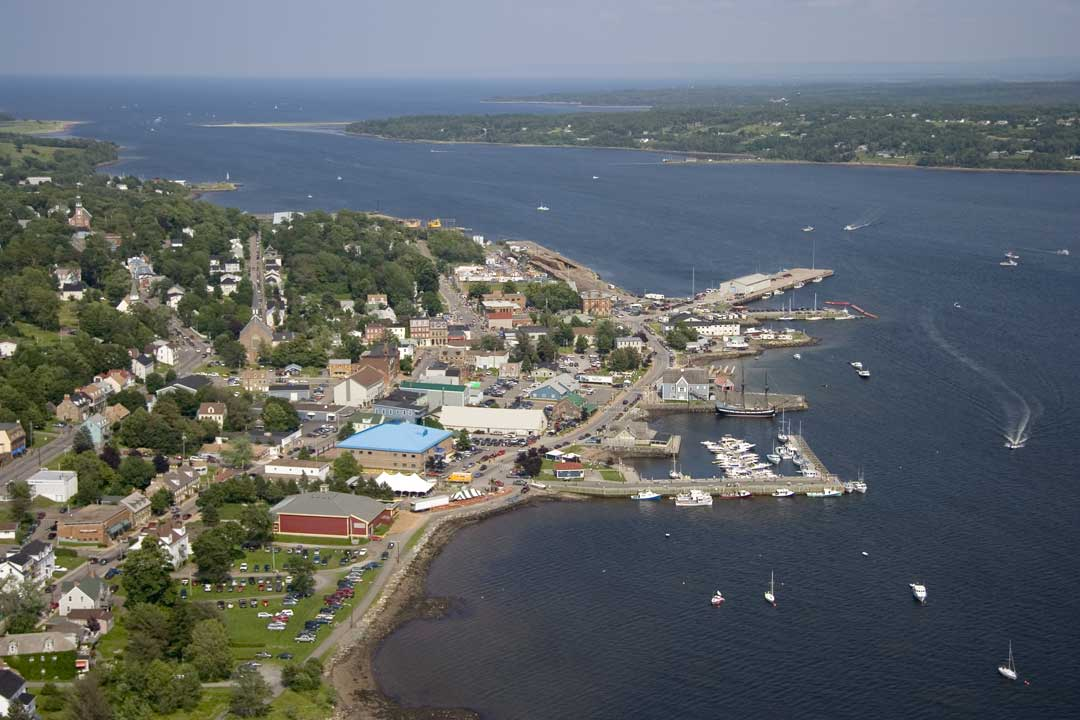
Aerial view of Pictou and the harbour

Pictou Harbour is a natural harbour in Nova Scotia on the Northumberland Strait.

== Geography ==
The distance between the town of Pictou on the north shore, and the community of Pictou Landing to the south is about 1 km (0.62 mi). The south side of the harbour opens into the broad mouth of the East River of Pictou which flows inland through the towns of Trenton and New Glasgow. The south-west end of the harbour is bisected by the Harvey Veniot causeway that carries Nova Scotia Highway 106. The causeway has limited the navigable portion of the harbour to approximately 5 km (3.1 mi) in length. Prior to the opening of the causeway in 1968, the harbour continued into the confluence of the West River of Pictou and Middle River of Pictou, both of which were navigable.

The body of water immediately outside the harbour is known as the Pictou Road. The entrance to the harbour is protected by two sandbars and is about 400m wide. A lighthouse was installed on this bar in 1834 and lost to fire in 1903. Its replacement, a 55-foot octagonal tower was also destroyed by fire on July 5, 2004.

== History ==
The first settlers arrived in Pictou Harbour in 1767 on the Betsey from Philadelphia. The Hector arrived in 1773, bringing the first Scottish settlers to arrive in the province directly from Scotland. Timber was being exported to Britain from Pictou harbour as early as 1777 and the first ship was built there in 1788 by Thomas Copeland. By 1803, fifty vessels loaded squared timber for Britain. The Harriet was launched in 1798 with a registered tonnage of 422 tons and is believed to be the largest built in Nova Scotia at the time.

By 1830 coal was being brought from the inland towns by steamboat for transshipment and soon coal and iron were the chief exports through the harbour. The Pictou coalfield may not have developed prior to the building of the mainline railways in the 1860s and 1870s if it weren't for its proximity to Pictou harbour, and coal shipments continued until shortly after World War II. Pictou thrived as a port, and the United States government recognized its importance and operated a consulate from 1837 to 1897 to look after its interests in Pictou County coal and fish from the Gulf of St. Lawrence. Pictou opened as a port of registry in 1840 and at that time was registering between 20 and 40 ships a year. In 1874 the Customs House was built by the Dominion Government to collect tariffs and duties, and control goods and people flowing through the port, which was a significant port of entry at the time, and the main passenger connection with Upper Canada.

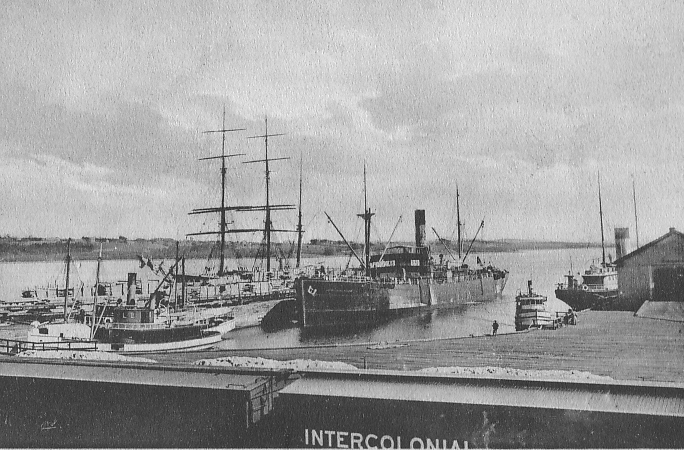
Wharf and Intercolonial rail cars at Pictou, circa 1912

The first railway to reach Pictou Harbour was in 1867 when the Pictou extension of the Nova Scotia Railway reached Pictou Landing on the south shore of the harbour. From there the railway company operated a steam-powered ferry to take passengers across the harbour where they could connect with ships leaving for Prince Edward Island and Montreal. There was also a coal pier there for loading ships. The Intercolonial Railway opened a line into Pictou town in 1887, crossing the harbour at the mouth of the West River. The bridge, known as Mile Bridge, was destroyed by fire in 1993. Ferry service from the upriver towns declined with the introduction of rail service and ceased in the 1920s due to the increasing use of cars, but the ferry between Pictou, Pictou Landing and Abercrombie continued until after World War II.

On August 24, 1873, a hurricane caused extensive damage throughout the harbour. The water rose above the wharves, causing goods and lumber to be washed away. Wharves and coal piers on both sides of the harbour were extensively damaged and ships at anchor were driven ashore. The brigantine Willow Brae was driven up the Middle River and 300 tons of coal had to be unloaded before she could be salvaged. The schooner Guiding Star carrying 140 tons of coal went so far up the Middle River that she had to be abandoned.

In 1879 the chief imports were flour, meal, beef, pork, sugar, tea and general merchandise, while exports were coal and lumber. At that time the minimum depth of water over the bar was reported as 24 feet, in the harbour 5 to 6 fathoms, and 21 feet at the wharves. The harbour was ice free until mid-December. There were two marine railways, one being able to handle ships of 1000 tons.

The Canadian Trade Review reported in 1900 that Pictou harbour was also handling produce and dairy products from Prince Edward Island, as well as most of the lobster from the eastern end of the Gulf. It was also importing iron ore from the mine at Belle Isle, Newfoundland, for the Nova Scotia Iron Company smelters at Ferrona, and copper ore for the Copper Crown Company in Pictou. A pier at Granton on the Middle River, 3 miles upstream from the harbour, was loading steamships of 3,000 ton capacity with coal from the Drummond colliery in Westville.

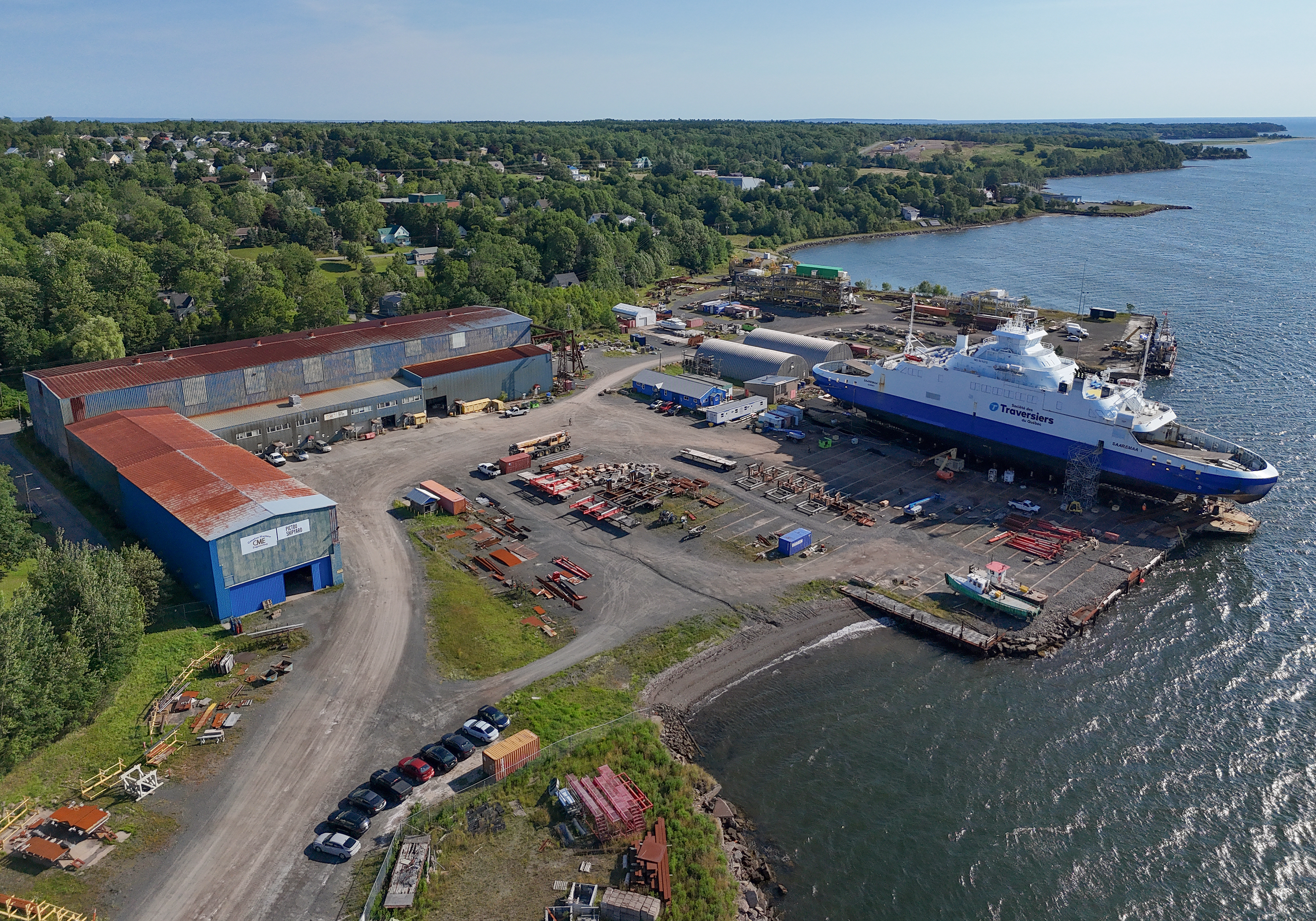
Pictou Shipyard

On September 25, 1925, the cargo steamer Dieuze caught fire and sank outside the shipping lane. The captain was the only person aboard at the time and he survived. The wreck was rediscovered in 2015 during surveying work by the Canadian Hydrographic Service sitting upright on the bottom in 13.5 metre deep water, but it wasn't until divers explored the wreck that it could be identified.

Pictou Shipyard was established during World War II, causing the population of the town to triple, and is notable for its construction of 24 Park ships over a two-year period during World War II, and continues in business today.

The landscape of the harbour changed considerably in the late 1960s with the construction of a kraft pulp mill at Abercrombie Point, between the East and Middle rivers. At the same time the Middle river was dammed to supply fresh water to the mill, and a causeway was constructed to carry Highway 106 across the harbour from Abercrombie Point to Pictou.

== Current usage of the harbour ==
In Pictou town, the Pictou Marine Terminals offer three berths for ships up to 150m, and a 17 berth marina for small pleasure craft and a Canadian Coast Guard Inshore Search and Rescue Service boat. The Hector Heritage Quay Visitor's Marina has moorings for 40 pleasure craft. On the outskirts of town is the private Pictou Marina, home of the Pictou Yacht Club. Directly across the harbour from there is a fishing wharf at Pictou Landing. Cruise ships began visiting Pictou in 2014.

== Environment ==
Being an estuary, the water is considered brackish, with a density of about 1019 kg/m^{3} that varies seasonally. The sand bar on the southside of the harbour entrance is an 8ha Provincial Nature Reserve, comprising beaches and dunes that provide habitat for the endangered piping plover. Human settlement and industrial activity have impacted Pictou harbour since the 18th century through pollution, impacts on wilderness habitat and harvesting of renewable resources. It is still a highly productive fish habitat which supports a variety of fish species, including oysters, clams, mackerel, herring, Atlantic salmon, striped bass, and brown trout.
