= Iron Rock =

Iron Rock may refer to:

- Iron Rock, New Jersey, unincorporated community in the United States
- Iron Rock, Nova Scotia, community in Canada
