= Watervale =

Watervale may refer to:

- Watervale, South Australia, a town in the Clare Valley, approximately 9 kilometres north of Auburn
- Watervale, Michigan, a former lumber town now a National Historic Site
- Watervale, New York, an unincorporated hamlet in Onondaga County, New York, USA
- Watervale, Nova Scotia Canada
- Watervale (horse), winner of the 1911 Preakness Stakes
