= List of shipwrecks in July 1914 =

The list of shipwrecks in July 1914 includes ships sunk, foundered, grounded, or otherwise lost during July 1914.

== 1 July ==
List of shipwrecks: 1 July 1914
| Ship | State | Description |
|---|---|---|
| Andrei Pervozvanny | Imperial Russian Navy | The Andrei Pervozvanny-class battleship ran aground off Osmussaar. She was refloated, repaired and returned to service. |
| Unione | Italy | The cargo ship ran aground on Lošinj, Austria-Hungary and sank. Her crew were rescued. |

== 7 July ==
List of shipwrecks: 7 July 1914
| Ship | State | Description |
|---|---|---|
| Calypso | French Navy | The Laboeuf-class submarine collided with Mousqueton (French Navy) and sank in the Mediterranean Sea off Toulon, Var. All 26 crew were rescued. |
| Granfos | Norway | The cargo ship ran aground on Mouse Island, Shetland Islands, United Kingdom. She was refloated on 10 July. |
| Hattie T. | United States | The sloop yacht went ashore at Fort Pond Bay, New York. Later refloated. |

== 8 July ==
List of shipwrecks: 8 July 1914
| Ship | State | Description |
|---|---|---|
| Tyne | United Kingdom | The schooner ran aground at Porthmadog, Caernarfonshire. She sank the next day. |

== 10 July ==
List of shipwrecks: 10 July 1914
| Ship | State | Description |
|---|---|---|
| New Jersey | United States | The pilot ship was sunk in a collision with Manchioneal (United States) at the east end of the Ambrose Channel. The crew were saved by Manchioneal. |
| Newstead | United Kingdom | The cargo ship ran aground in the North Sea off Boulmer, Northumberland. She was refloated on 15 July. |

== 11 July ==
List of shipwrecks: 11 July 1914
| Ship | State | Description |
|---|---|---|
| Cerro Largo | Uruguay | The 1,384-ton brigantine was wrecked at Porto Pedras, Maceio, Brazil. |
| Geo. P. Hudson | United States | The schooner was sunk in a collision with Middlesex in thick fog near the Pollock Rip Lightship. Three crew were killed. |
| Mendoza | Argentina | The cargo liner ran aground at Punta Mogotes. She was abandoned by her crew on 15 July and was declared a total loss. |
| Precursore | United Kingdom | The ketch collided with William Balls in the North Sea and sank. Her crew were rescued. |

== 12 July ==
List of shipwrecks: 12 July 1914
| Ship | State | Description |
|---|---|---|
| Lizzie Horan | United States | The barge caught fire and sank off Bartletts Reef, near New London, Connecticut. |

== 13 July ==
List of shipwrecks: 13 July 1914
| Ship | State | Description |
|---|---|---|
| Vivid | United Kingdom | The brigantine collided with St. Ronald (United Kingdom) in the North Sea off the coast of Yorkshire and sank with the loss of three of her four crew. |

== 14 July ==
List of shipwrecks: 14 July 1914
| Ship | State | Description |
|---|---|---|
| Usania | Norway | The cargo ship was destroyed by fire at Siglufjörður, Iceland. |

== 15 July ==
List of shipwrecks: 15 July 1914
| Ship | State | Description |
|---|---|---|
| Nymphea | United Kingdom | The bulk molasses carrier ran aground at Whinnyfold, Aberdeenshire and was a total loss. |

== 16 July ==
List of shipwrecks: 16 July 1914
| Ship | State | Description |
|---|---|---|
| Ceres | Portugal | The 103-foot (31 m), 139-ton fishing, or cargo, vessel was wrecked at Kouki, south of Mogador, French protectorate of Morocco. |
| Nelson | Canada | The 134-foot (41 m), 496-ton, out-of-service passenger ship was disposed of by burning on Kootenay Lake during the Chahko Mika Carnival. |

== 18 July ==
List of shipwrecks: 18 July 1914
| Ship | State | Description |
|---|---|---|
| Jeanne A. Pickels | United Kingdom | The schooner was driven ashore at Chance Harbour, Nova Scotia, Canada and was wrecked. |

== 19 July ==
List of shipwrecks: 19 July 1914
| Ship | State | Description |
|---|---|---|
| Cienfuegos | Cuba | The cargo ship was wrecked at Scatarie Island, Nova Scotia, Canada. |
| Clarence H. Venner | United States | The schooner was wrecked at Cape Sable, Nova Scotia, |
| Harold C. Beecher | United States | The schooner was wrecked at Scatarie Island. |
| Ragna | Norway | The cargo ship was wrecked near Louisbourg, Nova Scotia. |

== 23 July ==
List of shipwrecks: 23 July 1914
| Ship | State | Description |
|---|---|---|
| Berlin | Germany | The passenger ship collided with Ostsee (Germany) in the Swinemünde Haff and sank. All on board were rescued. |

== 27 July ==
List of shipwrecks: 27 July 1914
| Ship | State | Description |
|---|---|---|
| Yparraguirre | Spain | The cargo ship was severely damaged by fire at Sevilla, Andalusia. |

== 29 July ==
List of shipwrecks: 29 July 1914
| Ship | State | Description |
|---|---|---|
| Paragon | United Kingdom | The cargo ship collided with Taygetos (United Kingdom) in the Irish Sea off Barry, Glamorgan and was beached. |

== 30 July ==
List of shipwrecks: 30 July 1914
| Ship | State | Description |
|---|---|---|
| Cedia | Russia | The schooner was abandoned in the Baltic Sea. |

== 31 July ==
List of shipwrecks: 31 July 1914
| Ship | State | Description |
|---|---|---|
| Buccaneer | United Kingdom | The cargo ship came ashore at Tamatave, Madagascar and was wrecked. Her crew survived. |
| Framfjord | Norway | The barque came ashore in Saldanha Bay, South Africa and was wrecked. |

== Unknown date ==
List of shipwrecks: Unknown date 1914
| Ship | State | Description |
|---|---|---|
| Camrose | United Kingdom | The cargo ship ran aground on The Burlings, Portugal. She was abandoned on 29 July as a total loss. |
| Maltby | United Kingdom | The cargo ship was severely damaged by fire at Buenos Aires, Argentina. |
