= Greenwood, Nova Scotia (disambiguation) =

Greenwood, Nova Scotia may refer to:

- Greenwood, Halifax County, Nova Scotia, a rural community
- Greenwood, Nova Scotia, a village in Kings County
- Greenwood, Shelburne, Nova Scotia, a rural community in Shelburne County
- Greenwood, Pictou, Nova Scotia, a rural community in Pictou County
- Greenwood Heights, Nova Scotia, a neighbourhood of Timberlea, Halifax
- Greenwood Lake a lake in the Guysborough, Nova Scotia
- Greenwood Square, a rural community in Kings County
- CFB Greenwood, a Canadian Forces Base in Kings County
