= Nova Scotia Route 376 =

Highway in Nova Scotia, Canada

Route 376

Route information
- Maintained by Nova Scotia Department of Transportation and Infrastructure Renewal
- Length: 17 km (11 mi)

Major junctions
- South end: Trunk 4 in West River
- Route 256 in Lyons Brook
- North end: Hwy 106 (TCH) in Pictou

Location
- Country: Canada
- Province: Nova Scotia

Highway system
- Provincial highways in Nova Scotia; 100-series
← Route 374	→ Route 395

Route 376 is a collector road in the Canadian province of Nova Scotia.

It is located in Pictou County and connects West River at Trunk 4 with Pictou at Highway 106. It was originally part of Trunk 6 until 1970

== Blue Route ==
Traffic volumes are comparatively light on this highway. As a result, in 2017, portions of Route 376 and Trunk 4, and Pictou's Jitney Trail became the first segment of Nova Scotia's Blue Route, a designated cycling corridor.

== Communities ==
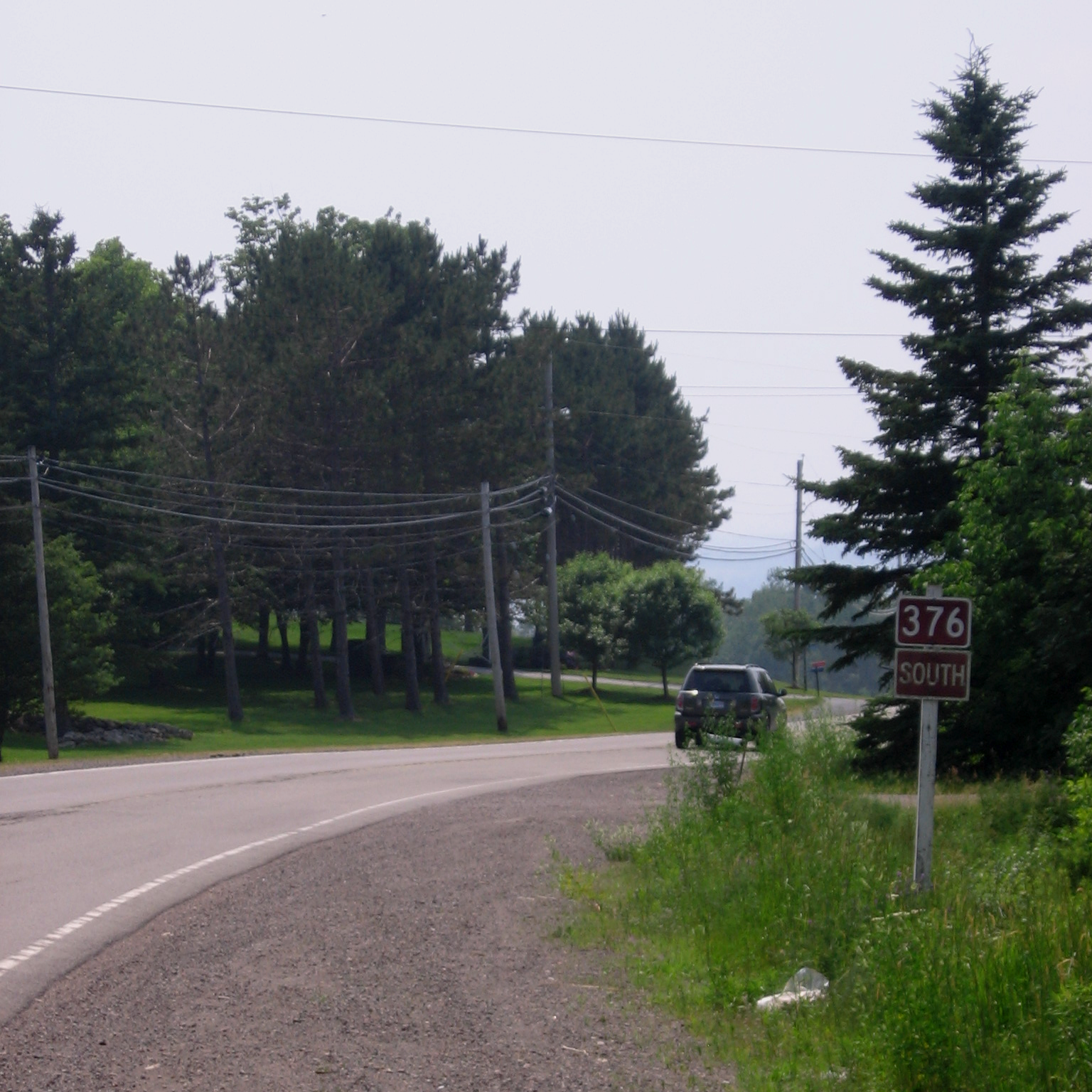
Route 376 outside Pictou, Nova Scotia

- West River
- Durham
- Lyons Brook
- Haliburton

== See also ==
- List of Nova Scotia provincial highways
