= Disappearance of Lilly and Jack Sullivan =

2025 disappearance in Canada

Disappearance of Jack and Lilly Sullivan
- Lilly Sullivan, left, and Jack Sullivan, right
- Date: May 2, 2025
- Duration: Missing for 1 year, 3 months and 9 days
- Location: Pictou County, Nova Scotia; 45°25′50″N 62°49′22″W
- Outcome: Unsolved
- Missing: Lilly Sullivan (aged 6 years); Jack Sullivan (aged 4 years)

Canadian siblings Lilly Sullivan (born March 2019) and Jack Sullivan (born October 29, 2020) disappeared from their rural home on Gairloch Road in Lansdowne Station, Pictou County, Nova Scotia, during the early morning hours of May 2, 2025.

A large-scale search effort was undertaken in the days immediately following their disappearance, which was mostly scaled back on May 7 after no trace of the children was found. Several further individual organized search efforts have taken place in the weeks since, which have not resulted in any significant findings. Police investigation into the disappearance has included interviews of at least 54 individuals, some of whom were administered polygraph testing. Authorities have stated that there is no evidence that the children were abducted, but they have "not ruled out" that the disappearance is suspicious.

The case has captured widespread attention throughout Canada and internationally due to the unusual circumstances surrounding the disappearance. As of October 2025, the Government of Nova Scotia is offering a reward of up to $150,000 for information that is deemed to be of "investigative value" to the search for the missing siblings.

== Background ==
The Sullivan siblings lived with their biological mother Malehya Brooks-Murray, their stepfather Daniel Martell, and their one-year-old baby sister at a rural property on Gairloch Road in Landsdowne, Nova Scotia. The property has been described as being surrounded by woods, steep banks, and thick brush. According to Martell, both Jack and Lilly were kept home from school on Thursday, May 1, and Friday, May 2, because Lilly had a cough. They had also not been at school on Wednesday, April 30, because there was no school due to a professional development (PD) day for teachers.

According to police records, on April 30, the siblings along with their mother, stepfather, and younger sister went for groceries together and arrived back home by 10:19 p.m. that evening. During the afternoon of May 1, the five travelled to nearby New Glasgow where Jack and Lilly were captured on video surveillance with their family at a Dollarama store at 2:25 p.m. Brooks-Murray initially stated to police that she put Jack and Lilly to bed at 9 p.m. on May 1, later changing the time to 10 p.m. in a subsequent statement. She also stated that Martell had stayed up after she went to bed that night, and she did not know what time he had come to bed.

On the morning of May 2 at 6:15 a.m., Brooks-Murray marked the children absent from school due to illness.

== Disappearance ==
At some point between 8:00 and 9:40 a.m. on May 2, Martell and Brooks-Murray claim that they were both in the bedroom with their one-year-old daughter, Meadow. The couple said that Lilly came in and out of the bedroom several times, and Jack could be heard in the kitchen. Shortly afterward, they say they could no longer hear either of them, and never saw the two children again.

Brooks-Murray said that Martell had put a wrench on top of the front door the night before and it had not been disturbed, so Martell surmised that the siblings must have gone out the back sliding door, which he also stated was typically silent when opened. Brooks-Murray stated that she and Martell then looked for the siblings outside, yelling out for them. Martell's mother, Janie Mackenzie, who lived in a separate building on the same property, said she fell asleep around 8:50 a.m. and awoke to the sound of her dog barking, and then heard Jack and Lilly playing on the swings and laughing in the backyard before she fell back asleep.

At 10:01 a.m., Brooks-Murray called 9-1-1 to report Jack and Lilly missing. Lilly is said to have likely been wearing a pink sweater, pink pants, and pink boots, and Jack blue dinosaur boots, when they disappeared. Martell told police that while initially searching in the forest he thought he heard a scream that sounded like it could have been Jack or Lilly, but a helicopter flying overhead then made it impossible to hear anything further.

== Aftermath and investigation ==
=== May 2025 ===
At 12:25 p.m. ADT on May 2, the Royal Canadian Mounted Police (RCMP) issued a statement notifying the public about the disappearance, asking anyone who might have information to come forward. At the time, police stated their belief that the children had wandered away from their home, and that there was no evidence of abduction. At 4:55 p.m., police issued an update advising a vulnerable missing persons advisory had been issued for Pictou County, and asking the public to stay clear of the area where the disappearance is said to have taken place.

At 12:45 a.m. on May 3, Brooks-Murray called police to report that the siblings' estranged biological father, Cody Sullivan, might have taken the children across the border to New Brunswick. Police response to this call included a visit to Sullivan's home at 2:50 a.m., where he stated he had not seen Jack or Lilly for three years. Police later made a request to obtain camera footage at the Cobequid Pass, which is a toll plaza located on the Trans-Canada Highway on the route to New Brunswick.

Later on May 3, police and volunteers numbering at least 100 searched the area surrounding the siblings' home using ground search, dogs, drones, and helicopters to aid in the search. The siblings' mother, Malehya Brooks-Murray, spoke to CTV News and stated that she was still "hopeful" the children would be located, saying "we just want them home as soon as possible". She further elaborated, saying that "[the night of May 2] was one of the worst nights because I didn’t have them in their beds, and I don’t want to go another night without them". The same day, Nova Scotia premier Tim Houston released a statement: "People in Pictou County and across Nova Scotia are praying for a positive outcome for two missing children. During this time of worry, please know that our first responders and volunteers are working tirelessly during this 24/7 operation".

By May 4, the number of people searching had reached 160, according to RCMP staff sergeant Curtis MacKinnon. Martell said he wanted authorities to "monitor the New Brunswick border" and nearby airports in case the children had been abducted. On May 6, Martell told CBC News that after the siblings' disappearance, their mother left the area to be with her family in another part of Nova Scotia, and blocked him on social media. The siblings' maternal grandmother Cyndy Murray spoke with The Canadian Press over the phone, stating that the family is hoping and praying for the recovery of the children. She also stated that police had advised the family "against speaking to the media".

On May 7, police announced that the search for the missing children had been "scaled back", with staff sergeant MacKinnon saying that there had not "been any confirmed sightings" of the children and that it was unlikely they were still alive. On May 18, a renewed search took place with 115 volunteers in addition to police personnel.

On May 28, a RCMP Major Crime Unit representative disclosed that the siblings were confirmed to have been "observed in public with family members" on May 1, the day before they were reported missing by their mother and stepfather. The location of where they were observed was not made public by authorities at the time, but it was later revealed to be a Dollarama store in the neighbouring town of New Glasgow. Regarding this development, the siblings' stepfather Martell told CBC News that the police had retrieved surveillance footage of himself, Brooks-Murray, their one-year-old baby, as well as Lilly and Jack in nearby New Glasgow, but that the precise location of where the footage took place could not be disclosed because it might impact the ongoing investigation.

=== June 2025 ===
On June 11, the Royal Canadian Mounted Police agency provided an update on the case stating that their "intensive approach" to the investigation is continuing. The police agency elaborated that the investigation might take "longer than" they had hoped, and that they are considering all possible scenarios and are partnering with agencies across the country. The agency said more than 11 Nova Scotia RCMP units are working on the case, including the Major Crime Unit and the Criminal Analysis Service.

The agency disclosed key details of the ongoing investigation, including that "hundreds of hours" of video of the areas surrounding the location of the disappearance had been collected, that they had formally interviewed 54 people in connection with the investigation which included the administration of polygraph testing, and that many of the 488 tips they have received have been assessed. The agency confirmed they had been granted numerous legal authorizations to seize and examine materials and devices that may prove useful to the investigation. Corporal Sandy Matharu, identified as the lead investigator on the case, stated that the RCMP is "accessing, evaluating and analyzing a significant volume of information from a variety of sources", and that they have a "very coordinated and deliberate approach" which they say will ensure that "all information is meticulously scrutinized, prioritized and actioned to ensure nothing is missed".

=== August 2025 ===
Redacted court documents associated with the case were released in August 2025 subsequent to a request for information submitted on behalf of The Globe and Mail, CBC News, and the Canadian Press, which revealed detailed information about the investigation. The documents revealed that as of July 16, the RCMP no longer considered the case to be "criminal in nature", along with several other details pertaining to the disappearance.

=== January 2026 ===
Newly unsealed documents were obtained by CBC News and the Globe and Mail on January 15, 2026, subsequent to a submitted request for information. Further details of the investigation were revealed, including details of an interview conducted by RCMP with Brooks-Murray on May 9, 2025. The documents showed Brooks-Murray discussed her relationship with Martell, and alleged Martell had been physically abusive. Martell denied those allegations in an interview with Global News, saying “it was part of a "narrative" meant to paint him in a negative light.”

In an interview, Staff Sgt Rob McCamon confirmed the nature of the relationship between Brooks-Murray and Martell at the time of the children's disappearance is part of the investigation into the missing children.

Included in these submissions that were filed in court by CBC in an information request was a filed affidavit by the RCMP. The affidavit noted police are "leveraging technology-based investigative techniques which may provide information to support criminality and uncover the whereabouts of the missing children."

Martell was arrested on unrelated charges of sexual assault, assault and forceable confinement on January 26. Police noted that the charges involve an adult victim, the charges are unrelated to the case, and the privacy of the victim is protected. Martell was arraigned on March 2, 2026. In May 2026 the case was rescheduled to July to allow time for additional disclosure, but was then rescheduled to September for additional disclosure.

== See also ==
- List of people who disappeared mysteriously (2000–present)
