= Donald P. McInnes =

Canadian politician

The Honourable Donald P. McInnes ECNS

MLA for Pictou West
- In office 1978–1998
- Preceded by: Dan Reid
- Succeeded by: Charlie Parker

Personal details
- Born: Donald Peter McInnes; December 19, 1933 Pictou, Nova Scotia
- Died: August 10, 2015 (aged 81) New Glasgow, Nova Scotia
- Party: Progressive Conservative
- Occupation: Dairy farmer

Donald Peter McInnes (December 19, 1933 – August 10, 2015) was a Canadian dairy farmer and political figure in Nova Scotia. He represented Pictou West in the Nova Scotia House of Assembly from 1978 to 1998 as a Progressive Conservative member.

== Early life ==
McInnes was born in 1933 at Pictou, Nova Scotia and educated at the Pictou Academy and the Nova Scotia Agricultural College. He married Jennie MacDonald in 1956.

== Before politics ==
McInnes was the president of the Nova Scotia Holstein Association and the Nova Scotia Milk & Cream Producers. McInnes was also a director and manager for the Pictou County Farmer's Mutual Fire Insurance Company. In 2002, McInnes was inducted into the Atlantic Agricultural Hall of Fame.

== Political career ==
McInnes entered provincial politics in 1978, defeating Liberal cabinet minister Dan Reid by 153 votes in the Pictou West riding. He was re-elected in the 1981, and 1984 elections. In April 1988, McInnes was appointed to the Executive Council of Nova Scotia as Minister of the Environment. He was re-elected in the 1988 election, and was moved to Minister of Fisheries in a post-election cabinet shuffle. When Donald Cameron took over as premier in February 1991, McInnes served as Minister of Transportation and Communications, and later as Minister of Agriculture and Marketing. In the 1993 election, the Progressive Conservatives were reduced to nine seats, losing government to the Liberals, however in Pictou West, McInnes was re-elected by almost 700 votes. McInnes did not reoffer in the 1998 election.

McInnes died in New Glasgow on August 10, 2015, at the age of 81.
