= Dan Reid =

Canadian politician

The Honourable Dan Reid ECNS

MLA for Pictou West
- In office 1974–1978
- Preceded by: Harvey Veniot
- Succeeded by: Donald P. McInnes

Personal details
- Born: Daniel Spencer Reid; July 25, 1944 (age 81) Middle Musquodoboit, Nova Scotia
- Party: Nova Scotia Liberal Party
- Occupation: physician

Daniel Spencer Reid (born July 25, 1944) is a Canadian physician and politician. He represented the electoral district of Pictou West in the Nova Scotia House of Assembly from 1974 to 1978. He was a member of the Nova Scotia Liberal Party.

Reid was born in Middle Musquodoboit, Nova Scotia. He attended Dalhousie University, where he earned his Doctor of Medicine (M.D.) degree. In 1973, he married Anne Marie MacDonald. He served in the Executive Council of Nova Scotia as Minister of Fisheries.
