= Muriel Baillie =

Canadian politician (1935–2018)

MLA for Pictou West
- In office 1999–2003
- Preceded by: Charlie Parker
- Succeeded by: Charlie Parker

Personal details
- Born: July 4, 1935 River John, Nova Scotia
- Died: September 22, 2018 (aged 83)
- Party: Progressive Conservative
- Occupation: Teacher

Muriel "Fluff" Baillie (July 4, 1935 – September 22, 2018) was a Canadian politician. She represented the electoral district of Pictou West in the Nova Scotia House of Assembly from 1999 to 2003. She was a member of the Progressive Conservative Party of Nova Scotia.

Baillie was born in 1935 at River John, Nova Scotia, and educated at the Nova Scotia Normal College for Teachers. A retired school principal in River John, Baillie was the Progressive Conservative candidate for Pictou West in the 1999 provincial election. She defeated New Democrat incumbent Charlie Parker by 147 votes to win the seat. She served as a backbench MLA in John Hamm's government in the 58th General Assembly of Nova Scotia, and did not seek re-election in 2003.

Baillie died on September 22, 2018.
