= Melrose, Nova Scotia =

Community in Nova Scotia, Canada

Coordinates: 45°15′43″N 62°2′29″W

Melrose in Nova Scotia

Melrose (Scottish Gaelic: Maolros) is a small community in the Canadian province of Nova Scotia, located in the Municipality of the District of Saint Mary's in Guysborough County. Located on the once famous for her Atlantic salmon St. Mary's River where the East and West branches meet at Silver's Pool. Because of the nature of the hills along the river at this pool one can find a stand of old growth untouched white pine and hemlock that rivals the beauty of Stanley Park. Melrose proper borders the Cumminger and Glenelg Lakes as well as the Gulch (a valley between Melrose proper and the Cochrane Hills). It with the neighbouring communities of Aspen and Glenelg constitute what is known locally as "the loop".

Historically a farming and logging community it at one time had a grist mill and tannery, the neighbouring Crow's Nest Gold Mine, as well as the 11 Mile House stage coach stop and local post office. Since its heyday in the late 19th century it has declined in population.

The one room school house was replaced with a four classroom school in the 1960s, known as Greenfield Elementary, around which much of the local community life revolved. Which educated grades primary to six until the 1990s, when consolidation of the municipality resulted in a single elementary school in Sherbrooke. Since then the building was used as a Seniors Club and Community Centre and post office until it was recently demolished, along with the community softball field.
