= Kings Head, Nova Scotia =

Community in Nova Scotia, Canada

Coordinates: 45°38′27.34″N 62°31′40.8″W

Kings Head is a community and headland in the Canadian province of Nova Scotia, located in Pictou County. Home to Melmerby Beach Provincial Park, Kings Head was the site of a lighthouse of wooden construction marking the entrance to Merigomish Harbour 31. The light is no longer operational but the base building is now a private residence accessed by Levi White Road.
