= Denver (name) =

Denver is both an English surname and given name. Notable people with the name include:

== Surname ==
- Bob Denver (1935–2005), actor most famous for playing the title character of Gilligan's Island
- James W. Denver (1817–1892), American politician for whom the Colorado capital is named
- John Denver (1943–1997), American singer-songwriter and actor
- Karl Denver (1931–1998), Scottish singer
- Matthew Denver (1870–1954), American politician and banker, son of James Denver

== Given name ==
- Denver Beanland (born 1945), Australian politician
- Denver Colorado (politician), vice mayor of Trece Martires in the Philippines
- Denver Jones (born 2000), American basketball player in the Israeli Basketball Premier League
- Denver Lopez (born 1980), retired Philippine Basketball Association player
- Denver Nicks (born c. 1985), American journalist and photographer
- Denver Pyle (1920–1997), American actor and film star
- Denver Randleman, (1920–2003), member of the Band of Brothers.
- Denver Riggleman (born 1970), American businessman and politician
- Denver Cuello (born 1986), Filipino boxer
- Denver, city in Colorado
