= Aspen, Nova Scotia =

Community in Nova Scotia, Canada

Coordinates: 45°17′50″N 62°3′11″W

Aspen in Nova Scotia

Aspen is a community in the Canadian province of Nova Scotia, located in the Municipality of the District of St. Mary's in Guysborough County.
