= Meiklefield, Nova Scotia =

Community in Nova Scotia, Canada

Coordinates: 45°32′2.65″N 62°27′15.69″W

Meiklefield in Nova Scotia

Meiklefield is a community in the Canadian province of Nova Scotia, located in Pictou County.
