= Priestville, Nova Scotia =

Community in Nova Scotia, Canada

Priestville
- Designated place
- Location of Priestville in
- Coordinates: 45.571996°N 62.624719°W
- Country: Canada
- Province: Nova Scotia
- County: Pictou

Area (2021)
  - Land: 0.72 km^{2} (0.28 sq mi)

Population (2021)
  - Total: 157
- Time zone: UTC– 04:00 (AST)
  - Summer (DST): UTC– 03:00 (ADT)
- Area code: 902

Priestville is an unincorporated community in the Canadian province of Nova Scotia, located in Pictou County.

== Geography ==
Priestville is 2.5 km (1.6 mi) southeast of New Glasgow on Route 347, just north of the Trans-Canada Highway.

== Demographics ==
In the 2021 Census of Population conducted by Statistics Canada, Priestville had a population of 157 living in 73 of its 79 total private dwellings, a change of −3.7% from its 2016 population of 163. With a land area of 0.72 km^{2} (0.28 sq mi), it had a population density of 218.1/km^{2} (564.8/sq mi) in 2021.
