= Greens Brook, Nova Scotia =

Community in Nova Scotia, Canada

Coordinates: 45°25′54.15″N 62°13′7.2″W

Greens Brook in Nova Scotia

Greens Brook is a locality in the Canadian province of Nova Scotia, located in Pictou County.
