= Piedmont, Nova Scotia =

Community in Nova Scotia, Canada

Coordinates: 45°36′22.44″N 62°22′17.2″W

Piedmont in Nova Scotia

Piedmont is a community in the Canadian province of Nova Scotia, located in Pictou County.
