= Denver, Illinois =

Denver
- Unincorporated community
- Location of Denver within Illinois Denver (the United States)
- Coordinates: 40°17′26″N 91°06′25″W
- Country: United States
- State: Illinois
- County: Hancock
- Township: Harmony
- Elevation: 672 ft (205 m)
- Time zone: UTC-6 (CST)
  - Summer (DST): UTC-5 (CDT)
- Postal code: 62321

Denver is a small unincorporated community located in rural Harmony Township in Hancock County in the U.S. state of Illinois, about eight miles south of Carthage and about 30 miles northeast of Quincy.

== History ==
Denver was laid out in 1863, and named after Denver, Colorado. A post office was established at Denver in 1863, and remained in operation until 1976.
