= Black River, Pictou, Nova Scotia =

Community in Nova Scotia, Canada

Coordinates: 45°40′16.19″N 62°58′53.51″W

Black River in Nova Scotia

Black River is a community in the Canadian province of Nova Scotia, located in Pictou County. It is on a small river known as the East Branch River John. Black River is also the name of one of two rivers in the area. One has its source near Scotsburn and is a tributary of the East Branch River John. The other is a tributary of the West Branch River John.
