= Upper Smithfield, Nova Scotia =

Locality in Nova Scotia, Canada

Coordinates: 45°15′57.84″N 62°11′7.93″W

Upper Smithfield in Nova Scotia

Upper Smithfield is a locality in the Canadian province of Nova Scotia, located in the Municipality of the District of Staint Mary's in Guysborough County.
