= Newtown, Nova Scotia =

Community in Nova Scotia, Canada

Coordinates: 45°21′55.6″N 62°8′8.1″W

Newtown in Nova Scotia

Newtown is a small community in the Canadian province of Nova Scotia, located in the Municipality of the District of St. Mary's in Guysborough County.
