= Harvey Veniot =

Canadian lawyer, judge, and politician

The Honourable Harvey Alfred Veniot ECNS
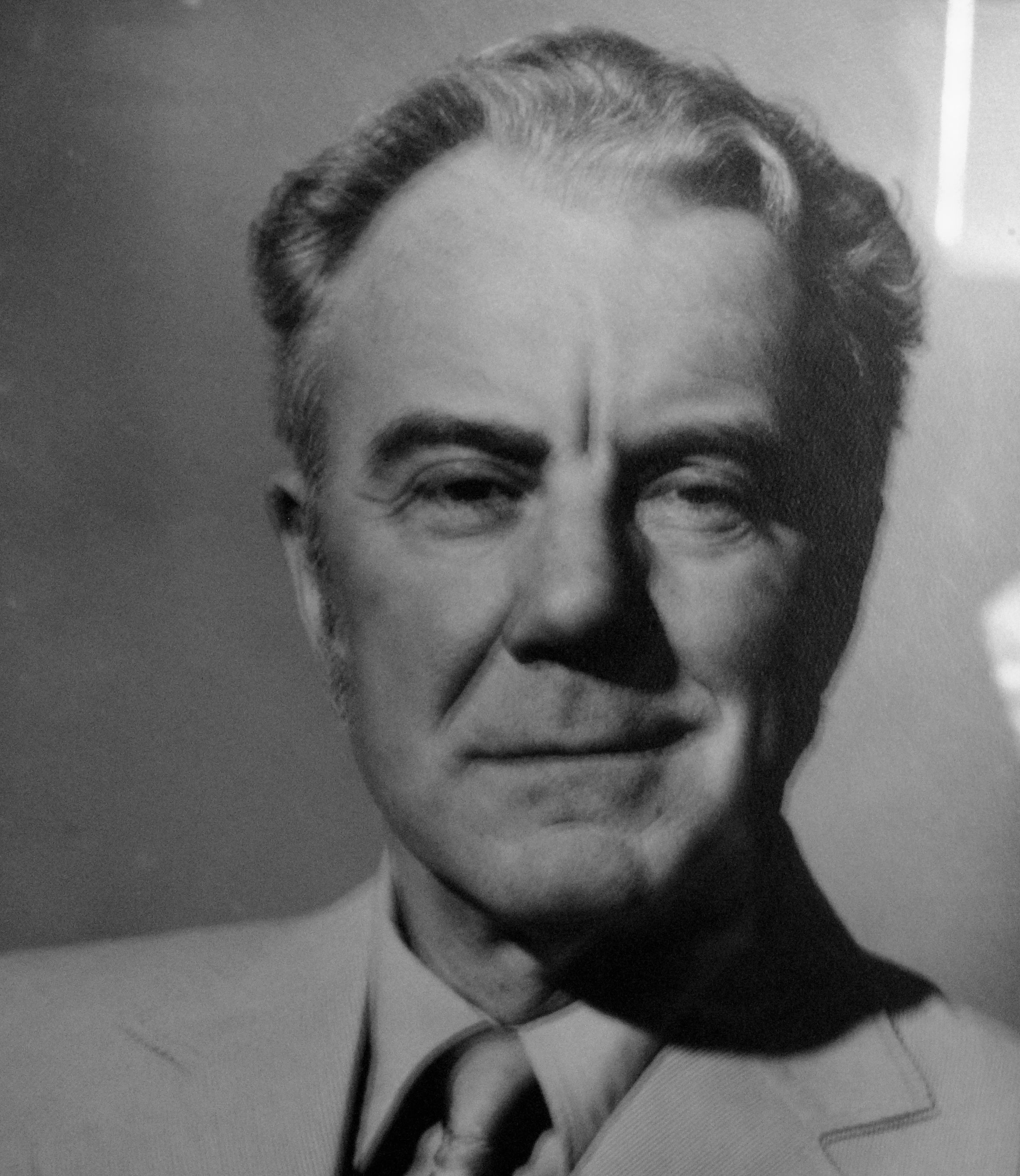
- Harvey Alfred Veniot, MLA

Speaker of the House of Assembly of Nova Scotia
- In office February 8, 1961 – April 11, 1968
- Preceded by: W. S. Kennedy Jones
- Succeeded by: G. H. (Paddy) Fitzgerald

MLA for Pictou West
- In office 1956–1974
- Preceded by: Stewart W. Proudfoot
- Succeeded by: Dan Reid

Personal details
- Born: November 18, 1915 Pictou, Nova Scotia
- Died: October 2, 2009 (aged 93) Pictou, Nova Scotia
- Party: Progressive Conservative
- Occupation: Attorney

Harvey Alfred Veniot, QC (November 18, 1915 – October 2, 2009) was a lawyer, judge and political figure in Nova Scotia, Canada. He represented Pictou West in the Nova Scotia House of Assembly from 1956 to 1974 as a Progressive Conservative member.

Veniot was born in Pictou, Nova Scotia, the son of Alexander R. Veniot and Gladys Maclean, and was educated at Pictou Academy, St. Francis Xavier University, Dalhousie Law School and the University of Saskatchewan. He was called to the Nova Scotia bar in 1940. Veniot married Rhoda Marion MacLeod in 1944.

== Political career ==
Veniot served as a town councillor in Pictou from 1945 to 1946. In 1953, he was an unsuccessful candidate for a seat in the provincial assembly, losing to Liberal incumbent Stewart W. Proudfoot by 9 votes. Veniot ran again in the 1956 election, defeating Proudfoot by 88 votes to win the Pictou West riding. In 1958, he was named Queen's Counsel. Veniot was re-elected in the 1960, 1963, 1967, and 1970 elections.

Veniot served as Speaker of the House of Assembly of Nova Scotia from February 1961 to April 1968. In May 1968, Venoit was appointed to the Executive Council of Nova Scotia as Minister of Agriculture. He was given an additional role in cabinet in July 1968 as Minister of Municipal Affairs. He was defeated when he ran for re-election in 1974, losing to Liberal Dan Reid by 22 votes.

Following his defeat, Veniot returned to the practice of law. In 1979, he was named judge in the Provincial Court of Nova Scotia. Veniot died on October 2, 2009.

The Harvey A. Veniot Causeway carrying Nova Scotia Highway 106 across Pictou Harbour has been named in his honour.
