= Melmerby Beach Provincial Park =

Provincial park in Nova Scotia, Canada

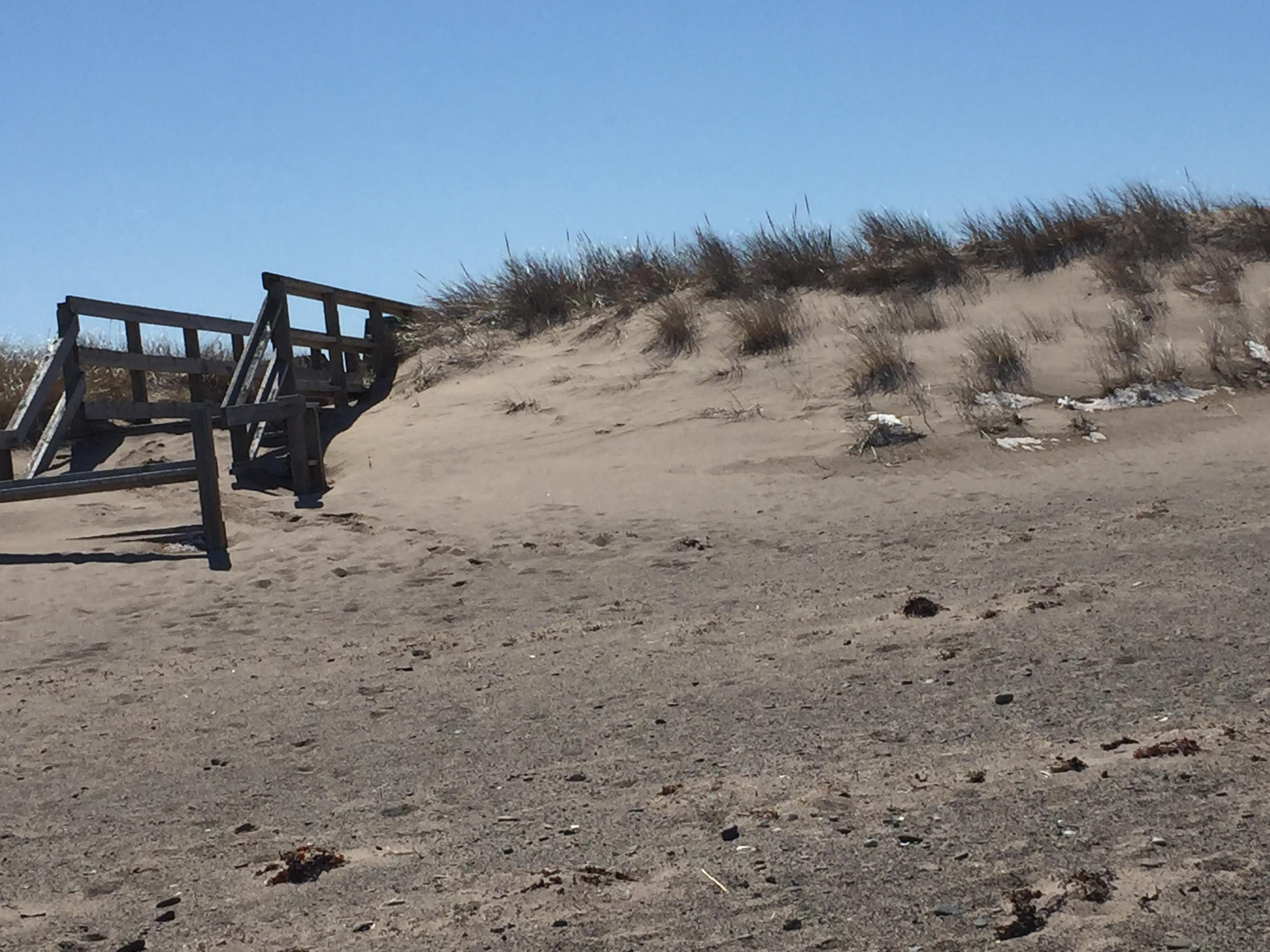
Early Spring view of Melmerby Beach- Pictou County, N.S.

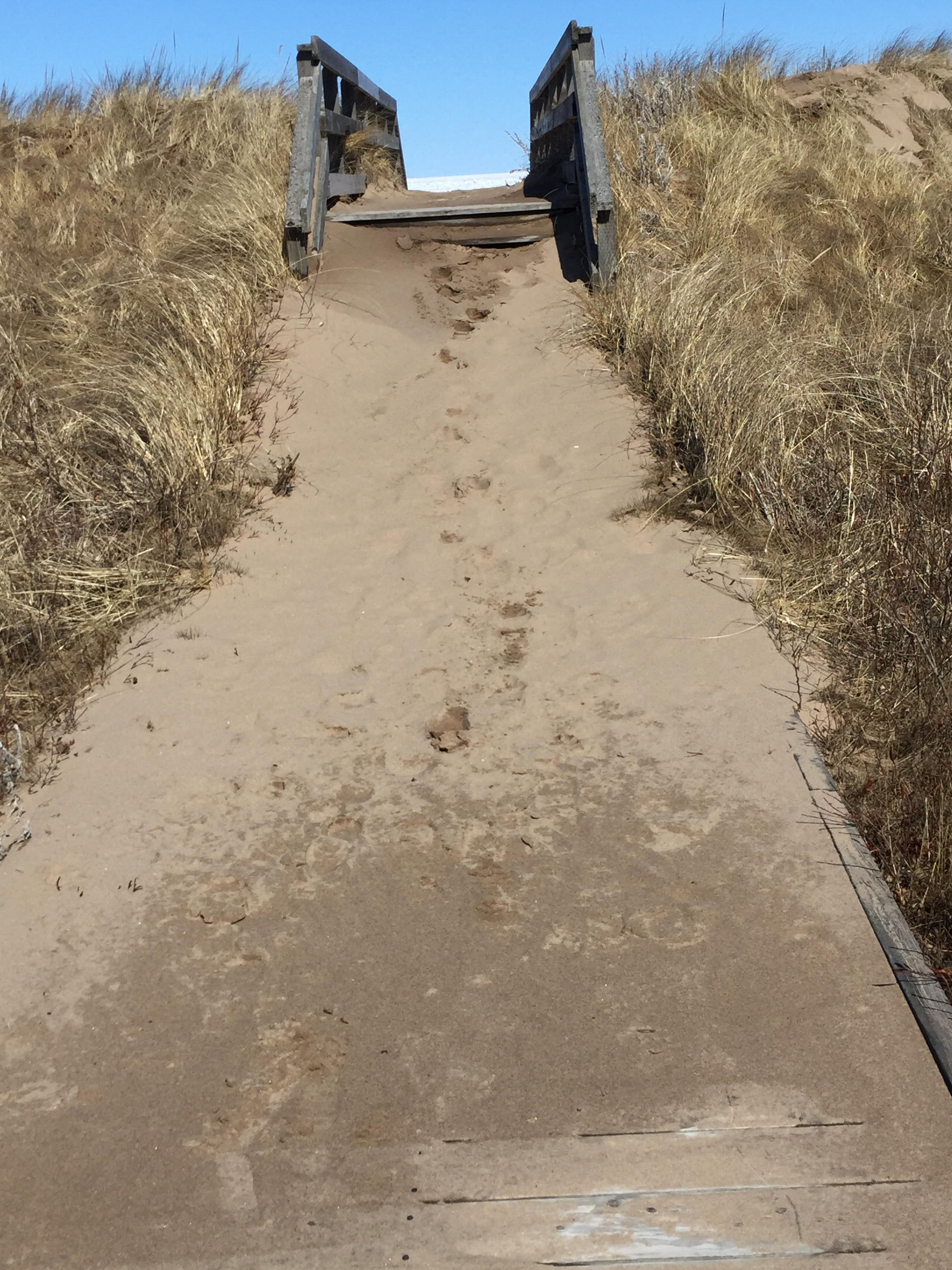
Entry to Melmerby Beach

Melmerby Beach Provincial Park is a provincial park located in Kings Head, Nova Scotia, Canada.

== General Information ==
Melmerby Beach Provincial Park is located on Nova Scotia's North Shore, fronting the Northumberland Strait approximately 10 km (6.2 mi) northeast of New Glasgow. The sand barrier beach is approximately 2 km in length and connects Kings Head with Roy Island.

The provincial park was established on 26 July 1977.

The park takes its name from the sailing barque Melmerby, which was travelling from Quebec when it wrecked at the beach in 1890 with considerable loss of life. Before the sinking of the Melmerby, the beach was originally named King's Head Beach.
