= Marshville, Nova Scotia =

Community in Nova Scotia, Canada

Coordinates: 45°45′12.21″N 63°7′0.47″W

Marshville in Nova Scotia

Marshville is a community in the Canadian province of Nova Scotia, located in Pictou County.

Rushton's Beach Provincial Park is situated here on the shore of Amet Sound. This 18.93 ha park provides boardwalk access to the beach across saltmarsh which attracts a variety of birds.
