= Denver Township, Richland County, Illinois =

Denver Township
- Township
- Location of Illinois in the United States
- Coordinates: 38°48′10″N 88°12′16″W
- Country: United States
- State: Illinois
- County: Richland
- Settled: November 4, 1879

Area
  - Total: 35.41 sq mi (91.7 km^{2})
  - Land: 35.4 sq mi (92 km^{2})
  - Water: 0.01 sq mi (0.026 km^{2})
- Elevation: 479 ft (146 m)

Population (2010)
  - Estimate (2016): 405
  - Density: 11.6/sq mi (4.5/km^{2})
- Time zone: UTC-6 (CST)
  - Summer (DST): UTC-5 (CDT)
- FIPS code: 17-159-19486

Denver Township is located in Richland County, Illinois. As of the 2010 census, its population was 411 and it contained 162 housing units. Before May 2, 1859, the locale was known as Boone Township.

== Geography ==
According to the 2010 census, the township has a total area of 35.41 square miles (91.7 km^{2}), of which 35.4 square miles (92 km^{2}) (or 99.97%) is land and 0.01 square miles (0.026 km^{2}) (or 0.03%) is water.

== Demographics ==
Historical population
Census	Pop.	Note	%±
2016 (est.)	405
U.S. Decennial Census
