= Denver Township, Rock County, Minnesota =

Denver Township, Minnesota
- Township
- Location within the state of Minnesota Denver Township, Minnesota (the United States)
- Coordinates: 43°48′35″N 96°13′26″W
- Country: United States
- State: Minnesota
- County: Rock

Area
  - Total: 34.2 sq mi (88.5 km^{2})
  - Land: 34.2 sq mi (88.5 km^{2})
  - Water: 0 sq mi (0.0 km^{2})
- Elevation: 1,719 ft (524 m)

Population (2000)
  - Total: 212
  - Density: 6.2/sq mi (2.4/km^{2})
- Time zone: UTC-6 (Central (CST))
  - Summer (DST): UTC-5 (CDT)
- FIPS code: 27-15742
- GNIS feature ID: 0663968

Denver Township is a township in Rock County, Minnesota, United States. The population was 212 at the 2000 census.

== History ==
Denver Township was originally called Dover Township, and under the latter name was organized in 1878. The name was changed in 1880, there being another township in the state with the name Dover. It was then named after Denver, Colorado.

== Geography ==
According to the United States Census Bureau, the township has a total area of 34.2 square miles (89 km^{2}), all land.

== Demographics ==
As of the census of 2000, there were 212 people, 74 households, and 58 families residing in the township. The population density was 6.2 inhabitants per square mile (2.4/km^{2}). There were 76 housing units at an average density of 2.2 per square mile (0.85/km^{2}). The racial makeup of the township was 95.28% White, 1.42% Native American, 1.42% Asian, and 1.89% from two or more races.

There were 74 households, out of which 39.2% had children under the age of 18 living with them, 75.7% were married couples living together, and 20.3% were non-families. 18.9% of all households were made up of individuals, and 4.1% had someone living alone who was 65 years of age or older. The average household size was 2.86 and the average family size was 3.25.

In the township the population was spread out, with 33.0% under the age of 18, 4.2% from 18 to 24, 23.6% from 25 to 44, 27.8% from 45 to 64, and 11.3% who were 65 years of age or older. The median age was 38 years. For every 100 females, there were 107.8 males. For every 100 females age 18 and over, there were 115.2 males.

The median income for a household in the township was $36,719, and the median income for a family was $38,036. Males had a median income of $24,375 versus $17,750 for females. The per capita income for the township was $11,803. About 7.7% of families and 6.6% of the population were below the poverty line, including 4.2% of those under the age of eighteen and none of those 65 or over.

== Politics ==
Denver Township is located in Minnesota's 1st congressional district, represented by Mankato educator Tim Walz, a Democrat. At the state level, Denver Township is located in Senate District 22, represented by Republican Doug Magnus, and in House District 22A, represented by Republican Joe Schomacker.
