= Chance Harbour, Nova Scotia =

Community in Nova Scotia, Canada

Chance Harbour
- Chance Harbour in Nova Scotia
- Coordinates: 45°39′52.44″N 62°35′31.31″W
- Country: Canada
- Province: Nova Scotia
- Municipality: Pictou County

Government
  - Governing Body: Trenton Town Council
  - Mayor: Shannon Macinnis
  - MLA: Pat Dunn (PC)
  - MP: Sean Fraser (L)
- Time zone: UTC-4 (AST)
  - Summer (DST): UTC-3 (ADT)
- Area code: 782

Chance Harbour is a community in the Canadian province of Nova Scotia, located in Pictou County. It is situated 90 minutes from both Halifax and the scenic Cabot Trail and 30 minutes from the Caribou-Wood Islands Ferry. It is home to Melmerby Beach Provincial Park.
