= East River St. Marys, Nova Scotia =

Community in Nova Scotia, Canada

Coordinates: 45°23′32.94″N 62°10′22.51″W

East River St. Marys in Nova Scotia

East River St. Marys is a small community in the Canadian province of Nova Scotia, located in Pictou County.
