= Hillside, Nova Scotia =

Community in Nova Scotia, Canada

Coordinates: 46.015398°N 60.146482°W

Hillside is a community in the Canadian province of Nova Scotia, located in Pictou County. Located between the Town of Trenton and community of Pictou Landing, the community holds the status of designated place in Canadian census data, and had a population of 122 in the Canada 2021 Census.

== Demographics ==
In the 2021 Census of Population conducted by Statistics Canada, Hillside had a population of 122 living in 60 of its 66 total private dwellings, a change of -18.1% from its 2016 population of 149. With a land area of 1.38 km^{2} (0.53 sq mi), it had a population density of 88.4/km^{2} (229.0/sq mi) in 2021.
