= Mount William, Nova Scotia =

Community in Nova Scotia, Canada

Coordinates: 45°35′35.74″N 62°42′21.65″W

Mount William in Nova Scotia

Mount William is a small community in the Canadian province of Nova Scotia, located in Pictou County.
