= Willowdale, Pictou, Nova Scotia =

Community in Nova Scotia, Canada

Coordinates: 45°23′44.66″N 62°13′21.1″W

Willowdale in Nova Scotia

Willowdale is a community in the Canadian province of Nova Scotia, located in Pictou County.
