= Blue Mountain, Pictou County, Nova Scotia =

Community in Nova Scotia, Canada

Coordinates: 45°29′6″N 62°26′30″W

Blue Mountain in Nova Scotia

Blue Mountain is a community in the Canadian province of Nova Scotia, located in Pictou County. The area was named by Wm. Ross, who settled there in 1818. Wm. Urquhart, from Scotland, was the first settler, in the year 1815.
