= Plymouth, Pictou County, Nova Scotia =

Community in Nova Scotia, Canada

Coordinates: 45°32′48.9″N 62°39′10.3″W

Plymouth is a small community in the Canadian province of Nova Scotia, located in Pictou County. It is located approximately 3 km south of the town of New Glasgow. It stretches along Route 348 situated on the east bank of the East River of Pictou, opposite the town of Stellarton.

Now largely dominated by mixed farming and near-urban sprawl, Plymouth is home to the site of the Westray Mine. A methane gas explosion in the mine on May 9, 1992, which killed 26 miners, placed Plymouth in the international media spotlight for almost a week during the failed rescue efforts, with the local community centre, opposite the mine site, becoming a symbol of the area.

The name came from the Loyalists who came here from Shelburne in 1758.
