= Lansdowne, Nova Scotia =

Community in Nova Scotia, Canada

Coordinates: 45°26′8.03″N 62°49′5.19″W

Lansdowne in Nova Scotia

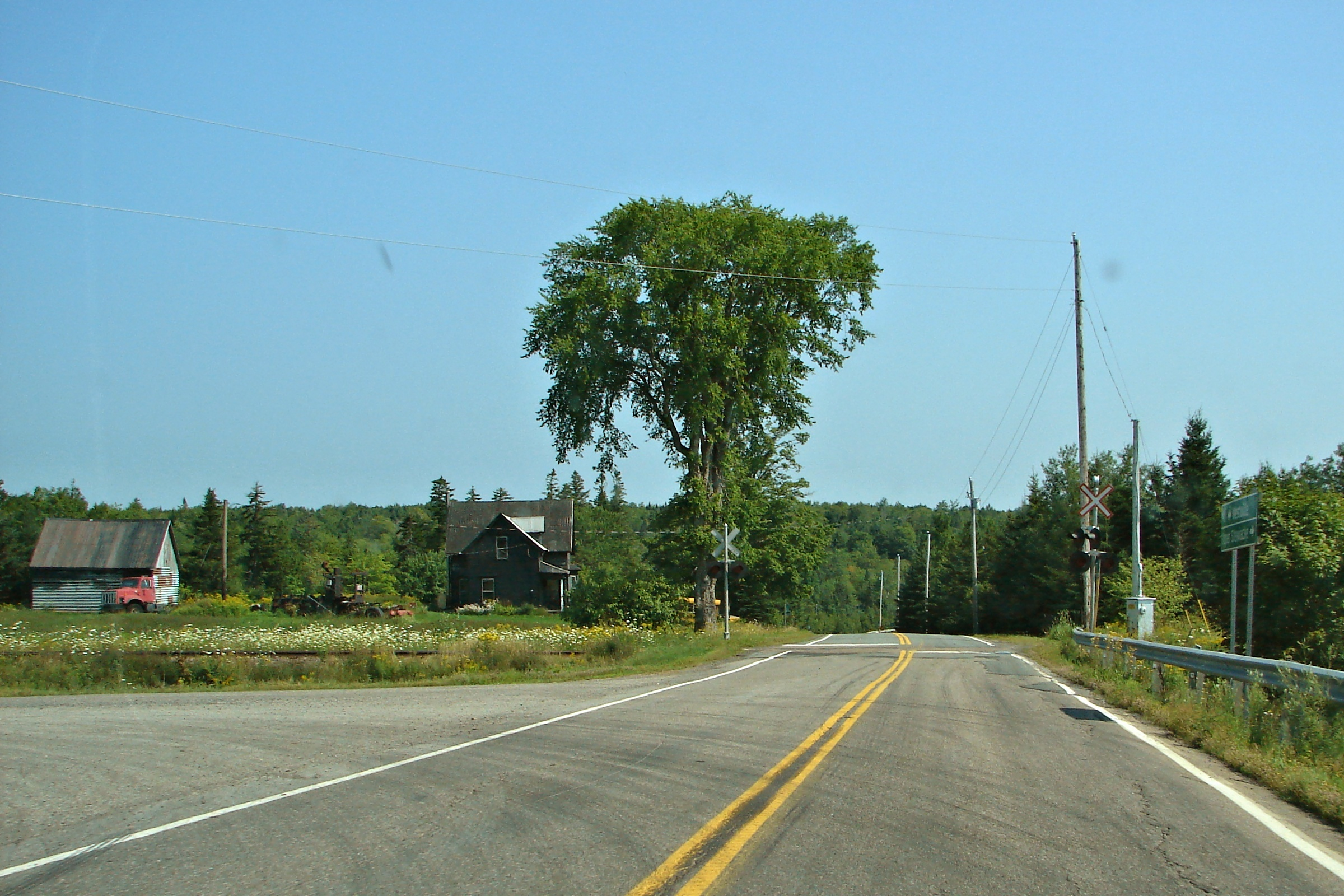
Lansdowne

Lansdowne is a community in the Canadian province of Nova Scotia, located in Pictou County. The community is named after Henry Petty-Fitzmaurice, 5th Marquess of Lansdowne.

This location gained widespread attention after the disappearance of Lilly and Jack Sullivan on May 2, 2025
