= Riverton, Nova Scotia =

Community in Nova Scotia, Canada

Coordinates: 45°30′25.45″N 62°41′11.2″W

Riverton in Nova Scotia

Riverton is an unincorporated community in the Canadian province of Nova Scotia, located in Pictou County.

Riverton is on the Cape Breton and Central Nova Scotia Railway freight-only railway line.

Riverview Adult Residential Care Facility, a centre for mentally handicapped and mentally ill adults operated by Riverview Home Corporation, is located in Riverton.
