= Coalburn, Nova Scotia =

Community in Nova Scotia, Canada

Coordinates: 45°33′58.42″N 62°35′29.45″W

Coalburn in Nova Scotia

Coalburn is a community in the Canadian province of Nova Scotia, located in Pictou County.
