= Denver Township, Adams County, Nebraska =

Township in Nebraska, United States

Coordinates: 40°33′48″N 98°26′52″W

Denver Township is one of sixteen townships in Adams County, Nebraska, United States. The population was 966 at the 2020 census.

== See also ==
- County government in Nebraska
