= Denver, Nova Scotia =

Community in Nova Scotia, Canada

Coordinates: 45°20′21.68″N 62°6′31.69″W

Denver in Nova Scotia

Denver is a community in the Canadian province of Nova Scotia, located in the Municipality of the District of St. Mary's in Guysborough County. It may have been named for Denver, Colorado.
