= Bridgeville, Nova Scotia =

Community in Nova Scotia, Canada

Coordinates: 45°25′48.19″N 62°36′23.68″W

Bridgeville in Nova Scotia

Bridgeville is a community in the Canadian province of Nova Scotia, located in Pictou County. It is on Nova Scotia Route 348 and the East River of Pictou.

Though now sparsely populated, Bridgeville was the scene of substantial iron mining operations in the nineteenth century.
