= Moose River, Pictou, Nova Scotia =

Community in Nova Scotia, Canada

Coordinates: 45°28′7.24″N 62°21′1.81″W

Moose River in Nova Scotia

Moose River is a community in the Canadian province of Nova Scotia, located in Pictou County.
