= Garden of Eden, Nova Scotia =

Community in Nova Scotia, Canada

Coordinates: 45°25′55.67″N 62°18′59.76″W

Garden of Eden in Nova Scotia

Garden of Eden is a small community in the Canadian province of Nova Scotia, located in Pictou County.

The Garden of Eden was settled and named by William Alexander MacDonald in 1830, when he and his family emigrated from Caithness, Scotland. This was part of a larger diaspora of Scots leaving for the Americas and Australia following the 45', the second Jacobite rebellion. This exodus was called the Highland Clearances. Bagpipes, Tartan and the hallowed clan system were outlawed and several Scots faced persecution. There have been nine generations of the MacDonald family to live in the Garden since it was settled.

Eden Lake is the largest lake in Pictou County and has been a draw for tourists and cottagers alike. The annual Blue Mtn. district Fire Department fishing derby is the preeminent event of the summer, taking place in the first weekend of June. The lake features a pair of twin Islands, once owned by Pictou County Legend Dr. Locke. They are known as the Lockless Islands.

The Garden produces lowbush blueberries, honey, pulp, wine and cannabis.
