= Pleasant Valley, Pictou County =

Community in Nova Scotia, Canada

Coordinates: 45°33′21.21″N 62°46′23.89″W

Pleasant Valley in Nova Scotia

Pleasant Valley is a community in the Canadian province of Nova Scotia, located in Pictou County.
