= Rocky Mountain, Nova Scotia =

Community in Nova Scotia, Canada

Coordinates: 45°23′37.06″N 62°14′59.05″W

Rocky Mountain in Nova Scotia

Rocky Mountain is a community in the Canadian province of Nova Scotia, located in Pictou County.
