= McPhersons Mills, Nova Scotia =

Community in Nova Scotia, Canada

Coordinates: 45°32′40.96″N 62°30′55.07″W

MacPhersons Mills in Nova Scotia

McPhersons Mills is a community in the Canadian province of Nova Scotia, located in Pictou County.
