= West River, Nova Scotia =

Community in Nova Scotia, Canada

Coordinates: 45°34′38.65″N 62°50′40.36″W

West River in Nova Scotia

West River is a community in the Canadian province of Nova Scotia, located in Pictou County .

It was formerly served by the Hopewell Subdivision of Canadian National Railway, which had a station in West River.
