= Churchville, Nova Scotia =

Community in Nova Scotia, Canada

Coordinates: 45°31′6.59″N 62°38′31.14″W

Churchville in Nova Scotia

Churchville is a community in the Canadian province of Nova Scotia, located in Pictou County.
