= Greenwood, Pictou, Nova Scotia =

Community in Nova Scotia, Canada

Coordinates: 45°33′9.09″N 62°33′44.09″W

Greenwood in Nova Scotia

Greenwood is a community in the Canadian province of Nova Scotia, located in Pictou County.
