= Loch Broom, Nova Scotia =

Community in Nova Scotia, Canada

Coordinates: 45°38′41.17″N 62°45′6.65″W

Loch Broom in Nova Scotia

Loch Broom is a community in the Canadian province of Nova Scotia, located in Pictou County. It is named after Loch Broom (Scottish Gaelic: Loch Bhraoin) in Scotland.
