= Watervale, Nova Scotia =

Community in Nova Scotia, Canada

Coordinates: 45°29′7.37″N 62°54′54.66″W

Watervale in Nova Scotia

Watervale is a community in the Canadian province of Nova Scotia, located in Pictou County.
