= Alma, Nova Scotia =

Community in Nova Scotia, Canada

Coordinates: 45°34′35″N 62°45′52″W

Alma in Nova Scotia

Alma is an unincorporated community in the Canadian province of Nova Scotia, located in Pictou County. It is named after the Battle of Alma which occurred in 1854 during the Crimean War. Alma has an estimated population of 290 as of 2024.

It is on Nova Scotia Trunk 4 which was formerly part of the Trans-Canada Highway until being bypassed by Nova Scotia Highway 104 in the late 1990s.
