= Little Harbour, Pictou, Nova Scotia =

Community in Nova Scotia, Canada

Coordinates: 45°38′35.98″N 62°32′45.07″W

Little Harbour in Nova Scotia

Little Harbour is a community in the Canadian province of Nova Scotia, located in Pictou County.
