= St. Pauls, Nova Scotia =

Community in Nova Scotia, Canada

Coordinates: 45°25′4.7″N 62°34′34.45″W

St. Pauls in Nova Scotia

St. Pauls is a community in the Canadian province of Nova Scotia, located in Pictou County.
