= Sylvester, Nova Scotia =

Community in Nova Scotia, Canada

Coordinates: 45°35′58.66″N 62°46′3.81″W

Sylvester in Nova Scotia

Sylvester is a community in the Canadian province of Nova Scotia in Pictou County.
