= Eden Lake, Nova Scotia =

Community in Nova Scotia, Canada

Coordinates: 45°24′22.19″N 62°17′51.47″W

Eden Lake in Nova Scotia

Eden Lake is a community in the Canadian province of Nova Scotia, located in Pictou County.
