= Springville, Nova Scotia =

Community in Nova Scotia, Canada

Coordinates: 45°27′7.43″N 62°37′58.08″W

Springville in Nova Scotia

Springville is a community in the Canadian province of Nova Scotia, located in Pictou County.
