= Eureka, Nova Scotia =

Coordinates: 45°29′53″N 62°41′10″W

Eureka
- Community
- Location in Nova Scotia
- Country: Canada
- Province: Nova Scotia
- County: Pictou

Eureka in Nova Scotia

Eureka is a community in the Canadian province of Nova Scotia, located in Pictou County.

== History ==
The earliest drawing of a surveyor’s map show the location of the various grants of land made to pioneer settlers Farquhar and Alexander Falconer, Alexander MacKay, James Robertson and Charles Fraser between 1813 and 1820. As the East River settlements grew and developed, a roadway was opened to more populated town of Stellarton.

The early history of Eureka is largely tied to the history of the Eureka Woolen Mill Company. In 1881, the company began construction of its mill buildings and machinery for processing of wool powered by water turbines in the Eureka dam.

The mill also operated a smithy, and in 1891 construction began on a 10-mile railway from the mill's blast furnaces to the terminal on the East River. A competition was also announced for ten names for the streets laid out at the town site, with prize money of $10 awarded per street name.

Eureka had all the makings of a growing town in the early 1910's. The Wollen Mills employed well over a hundred people and it seemed like the town would flourish in the coming years. But in 1915, the Eureka Woollen Mills burned down. No fire department existed in Eureka until 1949.
