= Glencoe, Pictou, Nova Scotia =

Community in Nova Scotia, Canada

Coordinates: 45°24′55.81″N 62°33′12.11″W

Glencoe in Nova Scotia

Glencoe is a community in the Canadian province of Nova Scotia, located in Pictou County.

The locality of Iron Rock is located within Glencoe.
