= Abercrombie, Nova Scotia =

Community in Nova Scotia, Canada

Coordinates: 45°37′55.36″N 62°41′19.85″W

Abercrombie in Nova Scotia

Abercrombie is a community in the Canadian province of Nova Scotia, located in Pictou County. This place was likely so named after General James Abercrombie, a British General, who was connected with the 42nd or the first battalion of Royal Highlanders. He made several campaigns in Canada, and was killed at Bunker Hill in 1775.

The community of Loading Ground existed nearby Abercrombie from 1838 until 1888.
