= Durham, Nova Scotia =

Community in Nova Scotia, Canada

Coordinates: 45°36′58.32″N 62°48′49.12″W

Durham in Nova Scotia

Durham is a community in the Canadian province of Nova Scotia, located in Pictou County on Nova Scotia Route 376 alongside the West River of Pictou. The centre of the village (where a bridge crosses the West River) is about 10 km up-stream from the town of Pictou. The Durham Presbyterian Church is located near the bridge on the west side of the river, and the Durham Community Hall (the old school) is on the east side of the river, adjacent to the cemetery.

== History ==
Emigrants from the Dumfries and Galloway region of Scotland settled the valley of the West River in 1776. Before coming to Pictou County, they had attempted settlement on Prince Edward Island, but they left after experiencing a difficult winter of near starvation. Those first settlers at West River were Anthony MacLellan, William Clark, David Stewart. William Smith, Joseph Richards, John MacLean and Charles Blaikie.

Anthony MacLellan donated land for a cemetery (on the east side of the West River) in which he was buried in 1786. West River Presbyterian Church was built beside the cemetery in 1813 to replace the log church at Loch Broom.

The farmers of the West River organized the West River Farming Society in 1817, the first agricultural society in a rural district of Nova Scotia.

The farming community along the West River developed into a village, partly due to the prosperity of the timber trade.

Durham is named after Lord Durham, Governor General of Canada, 1838–1839.
