= Rocklin, Nova Scotia =

Community in Nova Scotia, Canada

Coordinates: 45°29′51.66″N 62°46′59.12″W

Rocklin in Nova Scotia

Rocklin is a community in the Canadian province of Nova Scotia, located in Pictou County.
