= Scotsburn, Nova Scotia =

Community in Nova Scotia, Canada

Coordinates: 45°38′50″N 62°50′45″W

Scotsburn in Nova Scotia

Scotsburn (Scottish Gaelic: Beinn nam Mathanach) is a community in the Canadian province of Nova Scotia, located in Pictou County.

The community is the namesake as well as the former headquarters of Scotsburn Co-operative Services Limited, the former largest independent dairy company in Atlantic Canada, as well as Scotsburn Lumber Limited, one of the largest sawmills in Nova Scotia, with an approximate population of 5,500 as of 2018.
