= Sunny Brae, Nova Scotia =

Community in Nova Scotia, Canada

Coordinates: 45°23′56″N 62°30′1″W

Sunnybrae in Nova Scotia

Sunny Brae is a small community in the Canadian province of Nova Scotia, located in Pictou County.

== Sanctuaries ==
- Sunnybrae Game Sanctuary
