= Frederick John Knowles =

British flying ace (1895–1979)

- Born: 1 November 1895; Nairn, Moray, Scotland
- Died: 31 December 1979; Nairn, Moray, Scotland
- Burial place: Nairn
- Military career
- Allegiance: United Kingdom
- Branch: British Army
- Rank: Corporal
- Unit: No. 111 Squadron RFC
- Conflicts: World War I • Sinai and Palestine campaign
- Awards: Military Medal

Corporal Frederick John Knowles MM (1 November 1895 – 31 December 1979) was a Scottish World War I flying ace credited with seven aerial victories.

== Military service ==
Knowles served in No. 111 Squadron in Palestine, part of 40th (Army) Wing, in the Egyptian Expeditionary Force during the Sinai and Palestine campaign. Between 12 December 1917 and 18 January 1918 while flying as observer/gunner to a number of pilots, he accounted for seven enemy aircraft, all but one destroyed.

Air Mechanic 2nd Class Knowles' award of the Military Medal was gazetted on 10 April 1918.

== List of aerial victories ==
Confirmed victories are numbered and listed chronologically. Unconfirmed victories are denoted by "u/c" and may or may not be listed by date.

Victories
No.	Date/time	Aircraft	Foe	Result	Location	Notes
1	12 December 1917 @ 1030 hours	Bristol F.2b Fighter; Serial number A7202	Albatros D.V	Driven down out of control	Tul Keram	Pilot: Peter Roy Maxwell Drummond
2	12 December 1917 @ 1035 hours	Bristol F.2b Fighter s/n A7202	Albatros D.V	Destroyed	Northwest of Tul Keram	Pilot: Peter Roy Maxwell Drummond
3	12 December 1917 @ 1045 hours	Bristol F.2b Fighter s/n A7202	Albatros D.V	Destroyed	Wadi el Auja	Pilot: Peter Roy Maxwell Drummond
4	14 December 1917 @ 0945 hours	Bristol F.2b Fighter s/n A7202	Albatros D.V	Destroyed	North of Beit She'an	Pilot: Peter Roy Maxwell Drummond
5	28 December 1917 @ 1600 hours	Bristol F.2b Fighter s/n A7192	Two-seater aircraft	Forced to land; destroyed	Nebulus Valley	Pilot: Charles Davidson
6	17 January 1918 @ 0920 hours	Bristol F.2b Fighter s/n A7192	Two-seater aircraft	Destroyed	Kalkilieh	Pilot: Austin Lloyd Fleming
7	17 January 1918 @ 1130 hours	Bristol F.2b Fighter s/n A7198	Two-seater aircraft	Destroyed	Between Jaffa and Arsuf	Pilot: Austin Lloyd Fleming; also shared with another air crew
