= John Lloyd Williams (RAF officer) =

British World War I flying ace

John Jordan Lloyd Williams MC
- Born: 1894
- Died: Unknown
- Military career
- Branch: British Army; Royal Air Force
- Service years: 1913–1934
- Rank: Captain
- Units: Denbighshire Hussars; No. 111 Squadron RFC; No. 208 Squadron RAF
- Conflicts: World War I • Sinai and Palestine Campaign
- Awards: Military Cross
- Other work: Chief Constable of Cardiganshire

Captain John Jordan Lloyd Williams MC (born 1894; date of death unknown) was a British World War I flying ace credited with five aerial victories. He served in the Royal Air Force until the mid-1930s, and was later appointed Chief Constable of Cardiganshire.

== Early and background ==
Lloyd Williams was born in Oswestry, Shropshire, one of 11 children born to John Jordan Lloyd Williams, then headmaster of Oswestry School, and his wife Ellen Augusta Crawley (née Vincent). His grandfather was the Reverend Evan Williams, vicar of Nantcwnlle, Wales. He was educated at Oswestry and Ruthin Schools (where his father was headmaster from 1909), and from the age of seventeen he worked in the office of his uncle, Hugh Vincent, a solicitor, in Bangor. In 1919, his widowed mother, with the assistance of several of her daughters, founded Moreton Hall School in Oswestry.

== World War I ==
Lloyd Williams was commissioned as a second lieutenant in the Denbighshire Hussars, a Yeomanry cavalry unit of the Territorial Force, on 17 July 1913. On the outbreak of war the 1st Battalion, Denbighshire Hussars, were mobilized as part of the Welsh Border Mounted Brigade. In November 1915 they were converted to infantry, and in March 1916 were sent to Egypt to form part of the 4th Dismounted Brigade. In August 1917 Lloyd Williams was attached to No. 111 Squadron Royal Flying Corps in Palestine to serve as an observer/gunner in Bristol F.2b two-seater fighters. Between 8 October and 8 November 1917 he was credited with three enemy aircraft destroyed and two captured, two with pilot Second Lieutenant R. C. Steele, and three with Captain Arthur Peck. He was awarded the Military Cross on 17 December 1917, which was gazetted on 19 April 1918. His citation read:

Captain John Jordan Lloyd Williams, Yeomanry, attached Royal Flying Corps.

"For conspicuous gallantry and devotion to duty in aerial fighting. He shot down three hostile aeroplanes in a very short period showing great initiative and fearlessness all occasions."

Lloyd Williams then trained as a pilot, being appointed a flying officer on 30 March 1918.

=== List of aerial victories ===
Combat record
No.	Date/Time	Aircraft/ Serial No.	Opponent	Result	Location	Notes
1	8 October 1917	Bristol F.2b (A7194)	Albatros D.III	Captured		Pilot: Second Lieutenant R. C. Steele
2	15 October 1917 @ 0825	Bristol F.2b (A7194)	Albatros D.III	Destroyed	Shellah-Sharia	Pilot: Second Lieutenant R. C. Steele
3	30 October 1917 @ 0945	Bristol F.2b (A7194)	Two-seater	Captured	North-west of Khalusa	Pilot: Captain Arthur Peck
4	6 November 1917 @ 1045	Bristol F.2b (A7194)	Rumpler C	Forced to land/Destroyed	Um Dabkel	Pilot: Captain Arthur Peck
5	8 November 1917 @ 1300	Bristol F.2b (A7194)	Albatros D.III	Destroyed in flames	Muleikat	Pilot: Captain Arthur Peck

== Post-war career ==
In August 1919 Lloyd Williams was granted a permanent commission in the Royal Air Force with the rank of flying officer. He served in Iraq, and in late 1923 published an article on aspects of aerial navigation there in The Geographical Journal. On 1 July 1924 he was promoted flight lieutenant. He attended the RAF Staff College, Andover, from 19 September 1927. He was posted to No. 208 Squadron RAF in Egypt on 29 January 1929, and from 2 March 1931 served on the staff of the Headquarters of RAF Middle East at Cairo. On 1 December 1933 Lloyd-Williams was seconded for duty with the Metropolitan Police. On 23 June 1934 he was placed on the RAF retired list. Lloyd Williams served as Chief Constable of Cardiganshire from the late 1930s through World War II.
