= Sutherland Harris Memorial Hospital =

- Pictou County Health Authority
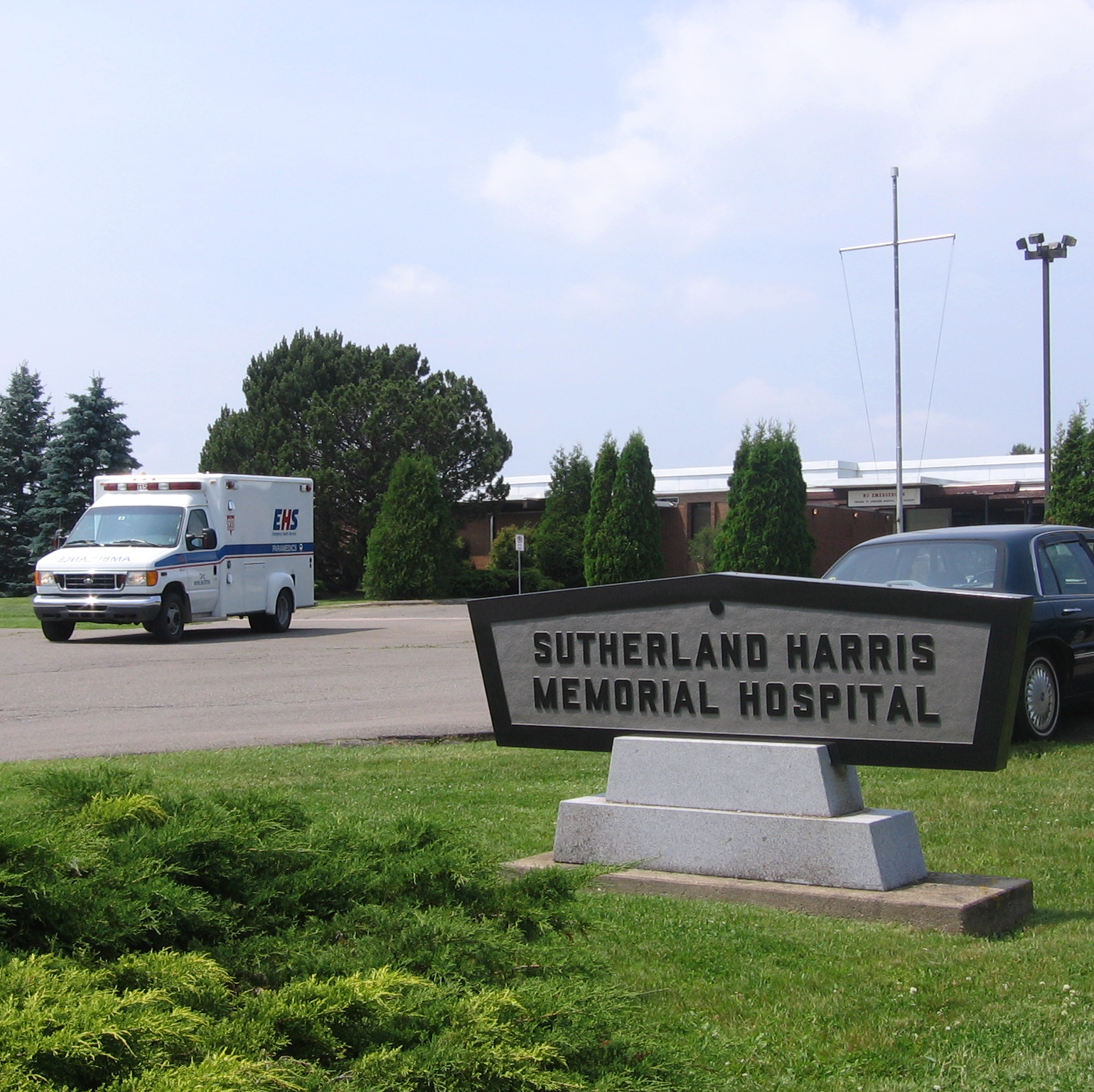

Geography
- Location: 222 Haliburton Road, Pictou, Nova Scotia, Canada
- Coordinates: 45°40′35″N 62°43′38″W

History
- Opened: June 1, 1966

Links
- Lists: Hospitals in Canada

The Sutherland Harris Memorial Hospital is a restorative care, veterans and various outpatient and community-based services hospital in Pictou, Nova Scotia. It opened on June 1, 1966. It serves approximately 48,000 people in Pictou County, Nova Scotia. It located at 222 Haliburton Road and is operated by Pictou County Health Authority. The hospital currently has 32 beds.
