= George Hill (RCAF officer) =

Canadian flying ace of WWII

George Urquhart Hill
- Born: 29 October 1918; Antigonish, Nova Scotia, Canada
- Died: 12 November 1969 (aged 51); Orangeville, Ontario, Canada
- Burial place: Haliburton Cemetery, Pictou, Canada
- Military career
- Allegiance: Canada
- Branch: Royal Canadian Air Force
- Service years: 1940–1945
- Rank: Squadron Leader
- Commands: No. 111 Squadron; No. 441 Squadron
- Conflicts: Second World War: Operation Jubilee; Tunisian campaign; Operation Husky
- Awards: Distinguished Flying Cross & Two Bars
- Other work: Medical doctor

George Urquhart Hill, DFC & Two Bars (29 October 1918 – 12 November 1969) was a flying ace who served in the Royal Canadian Air Force (RCAF) during the Second World War. The second Canadian to be awarded the Distinguished Flying Cross three times, he was credited with having shot down at least eighteen aircraft.

Born in Antigonish, Nova Scotia, Hill joined the RCAF in 1939. Once his training was completed, he served as an instructor for nearly two years before being sent to the United Kingdom to serve with a fighter squadron of the RCAF. His first aerial victories were achieved in August 1942 over Dieppe during Operation Jubilee. He later served in North Africa, leading No. 111 Squadron during the fighting in Tunisia and the Allied invasion of Sicily. After a period of leave in Canada, he returned to operations in early 1944 as commander of No. 441 Squadron. In April he crash landed in France and although he initially evaded the Germans, he was eventually captured and spent the rest of the war in captivity. He studied medicine after the war, and worked as a doctor for the rest of his life. Eventually settling in Orangeville, Ontario, he was killed in a car accident outside his home at the age of 51.

== Early life ==
George Urquhart Hill was born in Antigonish, Nova Scotia, Canada, on 29 October 1918. He went to school at Pictou, attending the academy there. A keen boxer, he was an intercollegiate champion as a featherweight. He subsequently went to Mount Allison University in New Brunswick, from which he graduated with a Bachelor of Arts degree.

== Second World War ==
On the outbreak of the Second World War, Hill joined the Royal Canadian Air Force (RCAF). Receiving a commission as a pilot officer, he underwent flight training and gained his wings in February 1940. He went on an instructors course and then took up a position as an instructor at No. 2 Service Flying Training School at Uplands. He subsequently served at Nos. 4 and 9 Service Flying Training Schools at Saskatoon and Summerside respectively. Flying from the latter, he reportedly carried out a low level flight over his home town of Pictou, for which he was disciplined. Hill preferred to serve in an operational posting, putting in numerous requests to his senior officers to this effect and in January 1942, he was sent to the United Kingdom.

=== Operation Jubilee ===
After a period of time at No. 52 Operational Training Unit, Hill was posted to No. 421 Squadron. A flight lieutenant at the time, two months later he was transferred to No. 453 Squadron. This was a Royal Australian Air Force unit that had just been formed at Drem, and was equipped with Supermarine Spitfire fighters. After a further two months, he returned to duty with a RCAF unit, this being No. 403 Squadron. His new unit was based at Catterick, being rested after involvement in Fighter Command's Circus offensive, and operated Spitfires. On 19 August, the squadron made several sorties flying from Manston in support of Operation Jubilee, the Allied landings at Dieppe. Hill made his first claims during the operation, claiming, with another pilot, a share in the destruction of a Focke-Wulf Fw 190 fighter, another Fw 190 damaged and a third as probably destroyed. Afterwards, the squadron returned to Catterick.

=== North Africa ===
In December Hill was sent to Africa, eventually being given a posting in early 1943 as a flight commander in No. 111 Squadron. At the time, the squadron was based at Souk-el-Khemis Airfield and equipped with Spitfire Mk Vcs. It was flying extensively during the Allied advance into Tunisia and Hill claimed two Messerschmitt Bf 109 fighters as damaged near Souk-el-Khemis on 4 February. He shot down a Bf 109 on 23 February and the following day shared in the destruction of a Fw 190. At the end of the month he shared with two other pilots in the shooting down of a Bf 109. On 4 March he destroyed two Junkers Ju 87 dive bombers, plus damaged another of the same type, all near Béja. Hill damaged a Bf 109 near Hammam on 5 April and three days later, claimed a Fw 190 as damaged and another Fw 190 as probably destroyed north of Majaz al Bab. He damaged another Bf 109 on 11 April and repeated the feat the next day, damaging two more fighters of the type. He claimed a Bf 109 as probably destroyed over La Sebala Airfield on 20 April and the same day was also credited with a Bf 109 as damaged. He shot down Bf 109s on 21 and 23 April and at the end of the month was promoted squadron leader and given command of the squadron.

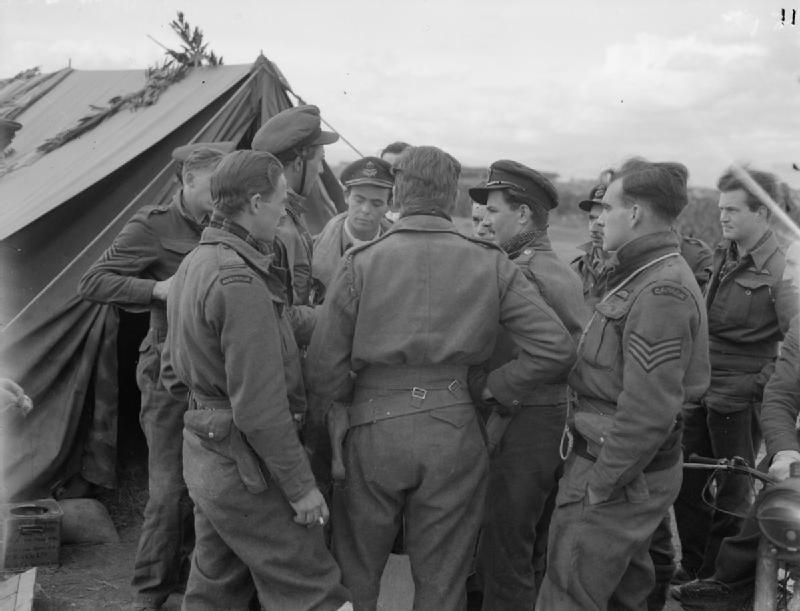
Pilots of No. 111 Squadron at Souk-el-Khemis

On 1 May, Hill was one of several pilots that engaged and shot down a Heinkel He 111 medium bomber to the west of Isle de Plane. Later in the day he destroyed three Messerschmitt Bf 110 heavy fighters, two of which being shared, east of Cape Zebib. On 6 May he shared in the destruction of a Bf 109 over the airfield at La Marsa. Later in the month he was awarded the Distinguished Flying Cross (DFC). The citation, published in The London Gazette on 21 May, acknowledged his work prior to taking over command of No. 111 Squadron and read:

Flight Lieutenant Hill is a skilful leader whose ability has been well in evidence during recent operations. He has participated in many sorties and has destroyed four enemy aircraft.

— London Gazette, No. 36022, 21 May 1943

Within a matter of days, he was awarded a Bar to his DFC, this time reflecting his successes as commander of the squadron. The published citation read:

This officer has led the squadron with great success and since early April 1943 has destroyed five enemy aircraft. Early in May 1943 he led his formation in an operation off the Tunisian coast. During the flight a superior force of enemy aircraft was engaged. In the ensuing combats seven enemy aircraft were destroyed without loss, two of them by Squadron Leader Hill. This officer is a courageous and skilful fighter.

— London Gazette, No. 36036, 1 June 1943

=== Sicily ===
In June, with the fighting in North Africa at an end, No. 111 Squadron moved to the island of Malta, where it reequipped with Spitfire Mk IXs. Operating from Safi as part of the Safi Wing, alongside Nos 126 and 1435 Squadrons, it subsequently started carrying out sorties to Sicily in anticipation of the Allied invasion of that island. With his squadron acting as escort to several fighter-bombers attacking Biscari Airfield, Hill shot down a Bf 109 near Acate on 3 July. A week later he destroyed an Italian Macchi C.200 fighter near Syracuse. With the Allied invasion of Sicily underway, he destroyed two aircraft on 13 July, the first a Junkers Ju 88 medium bomber intercepted while patrolling over the landing beaches in the morning and then a Fw 190 later in the day. Later in the month, with a beach head now established in Sicily after the Allied landings, the squadron began operating from Comiso. In August, Hill was posted to the headquarters of Fighter Command in the Middle East.

Still badly fatigued by his operational service, Hill then spent a period of time in Canada on leave, during which time a further award of a Bar to his DFC was announced. He was the second serving member of the RCAF to have been awarded the DFC three times. He was well received in his home town of Pictou, where he was feted and presented with a watch and also made public speeches in aid of the war effort. While in Canada he married Thelma Sanson, who he had met during his studies at Mount Allison University.

=== Europe ===
In January 1944, Hill returned to active duty with a posting to the United Kingdom as the commander of the newly formed No. 441 Squadron. Based at Digby and equipped with Spitfire Vbs, the squadron was in training and did not become operational until late March by which time it had received the newer Mk IXs. Now based at Westhampnett, Hill's squadron was part of a RCAF fighter wing of Spitfires operating with the Second Tactical Air Force, carrying out sorties to occupied France in anticipation of the invasion of Normandy. On 25 April, Hill led the squadron in a sweep to France alongside other squadrons of the wing, intended to draw Luftwaffe fighters away from heavy bombers following the Spitfires. Sighting six Fw 190s, these were pursued and all were destroyed, including one shared by Hill and his wingman. However, he subsequently had to make an emergency landing in a field near Épernay. Circling pilots saw him exit his Spitfire and make his way into a nearby forest.

Hill was able to evade capture with the assistance of the French Resistance. With their help, he made his way to Paris but was caught by the Germans when he boarded a train. He suspected that he was betrayed by the member of the Resistance that had assisted him. Believing him to be of some value for potential intelligence on what was believed to be the forthcoming invasion of German-occupied France, he was held in solitary confinement for some time with minimal rations. He was eventually transferred to a prisoner of war camp, Stalag Luft I, at Barth, where he spent the remainder of the war. Due to his experiences in captivity, his hair turned white and he lost 70 pounds in weight.

Hill ended the war credited with having definitively shot down eighteen aircraft, eight of which being shared with other pilots while also probably destroying three others. He is also credited with damaging ten aircraft.

== Later life ==
On being released from captivity and returning to Canada, Hill commenced studying medicine at Dalhousie Medical School, from which he graduated in 1950. He worked at Victoria General Hospital in Halifax, before moving to New Brunswick. He and his family subsequently lived at Orangeville, Ontario, where he worked at a hospital. He was married twice, his first wife having died in 1957, and had ten children, four of which were from his second marriage. He was killed in a vehicle accident outside his home on 12 November 1969, having just completed work for the day. He was buried at Haliburton Cemetery at Pictou.
