= William Lowden =

- Born: circa 1740; Dumfriesshire, Scotland
- Died: 20 February 1820; Pictou, Nova Scotia
- Occupation: Captain
- Children: At least 7

Captain William Lowden (born circa 1740 – died 20 February 1820) was an early shipbuilder and pioneer of Pictou, Nova Scotia. With his sons, he built the first shipyard in Pictou in 1788. For his achievements, he is considered to be the father of shipbuilding in Pictou.

== Early life ==
Lowden was born in Dumfriesshire, Scotland, and lived in the parish of Caerlaverock in 1766 when his sons Robert and Samuel were born. He began his career as a merchant in the 1760s, trading with Russia and also carrying convicts to Virginia. In the 1770s, he began to trade with the newly founded town of Pictou. On one of these visits, in 1777, his ship (Molly) was captured by American privateers from Machias, Maine:

The vessel was loading with timber for the British market. A time was chosen when the crew were absent with the boat for part of the cargo. The captain was invited to the house of W. Waugh, where a number of them were gathered. Waugh was an old Scotch Covenanter, and from rigid adherence to the principles of that body, would not swear allegiance to the British Crown, and though afterward he was in the employment of the Government, yet, at this time, seemingly from the common fact of their not taking these oaths, sympathized with the Americans. The Captain went without suspicion, leaving the ship in charge of the mate. During his visit, at a given signal, the company gathered round him, informed him that he was a prisoner, and commanded him to deliver up his arms. "Gentlemen," said he, "I am very sorry to say I have no arms," was his reply, in a tone of indignation at their treachery. In the meantime, a strong party, fully armed, proceeded to the vessel, and finding scarcely any person on board, easily took possession of her, and made the mate a prisoner, confining him in the cabin. They then placed sentries on deck. Some time after, the rest of the crew came onboard, and as they did so, they were made prisoners and confined in the forecastle.

The privateers took the ship and most of its crew to Baie Verte, New Brunswick. Lowden was released, and went to Charlottetown in a canoe, eventually joining the crew of a man-of-war in pursuit of the Americans. When the ship reached Baie Verte, the privateers abandoned the Molly, and Waugh was forced to flee to Tatamagouche, Nova Scotia.

== Move to Pictou ==
In 1788, Lowden moved to Pictou with his children William, Robert, Elizabeth, Thomas, and David. He first settled on the East River, and built a windmill and a shipyard—the first shipyard in Pictou—at a site that was later called Windmill Point. However, he soon left this site and moved to Pictou town. According to George Patterson,

(Lowden)...occupied a two-storey building of John Patterson's, on the site of Messrs. Yorston's store, the lower as a dwelling house, and the upper with goods, which he exchanged for timber. He also built a wharf, on the site of what has since been known as the Mining Company's Wharf, and commenced ship building there. The whole eastern part of the town, from Ives' store to the Battery Hill, was covered with a fine growth of hardwood, and the timber necessary for the work was cut close by his yard, or, afterward, on the top of the Deacons Hill, whence it was slid down on the snow to the shore, and, when once set in. motion, it may be supposed, went with terrific rapidity. He erected a building on the east side of Coleraine street, which he used for boarding his men, but which was commonly known as the Salt House. Some years later he erected a windmill on a round hill near the head of the wharf, long after known as Windmill Hill, but which has now been carried away in levelling the ground near the Custom House. This mill was well constructed, had a large amount of machinery in her, and for some time did a large amount of work, both in sawing and grinding.

His most famous ship was the Harriet (1798), at 600 tons the largest and finest ship built in Nova Scotia at the time. David Lowden, William's son, was the captain on the Harriet's maiden voyage, in which a French privateer approached but did not attack because the ship seemed heavily armed. Lowden's other ships included the Prince Edward (1798) and the Enterprise (1820; built by William and his son Thomas).

== Family ==
His wife was named Nichola McMorine or Morrin. They had at least seven children; Margaret (1761 Irongray, Kirkcudbrightshire-?), William Jr (?-1838 Pictou), David (1763 Dumfriesshire-1839 Pictou), Samuel (1766 Caerlaverock-?), Robert (1766 Caerlaverock-1843 Merigomish, Nova Scotia), Elizabeth (1770 Dumfriesshire-1840 Pictou), and Thomas (1772 Dumfries-shire-1845 Pictou).

== See also ==
- Pictou Shipyard
