= Arthur Peck =

- Born: 25 April 1889; Darjeeling, India
- Died: 14 February 1975 (aged 85)
- Military career
- Branch: British Army; Royal Air Force
- Service years: 1914–1944
- Rank: Group Captain
- Units: Devonshire Regiment; No. 111 Squadron RFC/RAF
- Commands: RAF Northolt; No. 55 Squadron RAF; No. 6 Armoured Car Company; No. 25 Squadron RAF
- Conflicts: First World War; Western Front; Macedonian front; Sinai & Palestine campaign; Ikhwan Revolt; Second World War
- Awards: Distinguished Service Order; Military Cross & Bar; Mentioned in Despatches

Group Captain Arthur Hicks Peck, DSO, MC & Bar (25 April 1889 – 14 February 1975) was an officer of the Royal Air Force, who was a flying ace credited with eight aerial victories in the First World War.

== Family background and education ==
Arthur Peck was born in Darjeeling, India, the only son of Lieutenant Colonel Francis Samuel Peck (1858–1908) of Bristol. His father was a surgeon in the Indian Medical Service, who died at sea aboard HMS Serapis while returning to England.

Peck attended Clifton College, Bristol, from 1903 to 1906, and was admitted to Christ's College, Cambridge, before spending the years 1908 to 1914 in Australia.

== First World War ==
Peck was commissioned as a temporary (wartime only) second lieutenant in the British Army on 7 December 1914, and served in the Devonshire Regiment in France and Salonika. He eventually joined the Royal Flying Corps, being transferred to the General List and appointed a flying officer on 4 October 1916. He was appointed a flight commander with the temporary rank of captain on 23 June 1917, and served in No. 111 Squadron based in Palestine.

Flying a Bristol F.2 two-seater, with Captain John Lloyd-Williams as his observer/gunner, Peck's first aerial victory came on 30 October 1917, forcing down a Type C reconnaissance aircraft north-west of Al-Khalasa, which was then captured. On 6 November he and Williams forced a Rumpler C to land at Um Dabkal, and on 8 November they shot down in flames an Albatros D.III over Hulayqat. On 17 November Peck was recommended for a Military Cross, following an action on 29 October when he single-handedly drove off three enemy reconnaissance aircraft over the Gaza Front.

Peck's squadron was then re-equipped with the S.E.5a single-seat fighter, and on 4 December he drove down another D.III out of control over Junction Station. Peck's award of the Military Cross was gazetted on 18 January 1918. On 3 March he and Major F. W. Stent shared in the destruction of a Type C reconnaissance aircraft south-east of Yehudieh, for Peck's fifth victory, earning him flying ace status. The next day, 4 March, he was awarded the Distinguished Service Order. Finally, on 23 March, Peck drove down out of control a Type C and two D.IIIs north of Jericho, an action which earned him a Bar to his Military Cross.

Peck received a mention in despatches "for distinguished, gallant and valuable services and devotion to duty" from General Sir Edmund Allenby, the General Officer Commanding-in-Chief, Egyptian Expeditionary Force, on 3 April, and on 13 April Peck was promoted to temporary major.

== Inter-war career ==
Peck relinquished his commission, after the end of hostilities, on 29 April 1919, but six months later, on 24 October, he was granted a short-service commission as a flight lieutenant in the RAF.

On 17 June 1920 Peck married Marjorie Amy Clare-Smith at St. Paul's Church, Clifton, Bristol. In January 1921 his short-service commission was made permanent, and he was a member of the aerobatic display team, led by Squadron Leader Christopher Draper, in the annual Royal Air Force Aerial Pageant in June.

On 1 January 1923 Peck was promoted to squadron leader, and on 6 February was transferred from No. 2 Flying Training School, and appointed Officer Commanding, No. 25 Squadron, based in Constantinople. No. 25 Squadron eventually returned to England from its base in San Stefano in October 1923, and was then based at RAF Hawkinge, flying the Gloster Grebe Mk. II, and a small number of Sopwith Snipes. On 27 June 1925 the squadron took part in the annual Royal Air Force Display at Hendon, giving a demonstration of "Squadron Drill", where nine Grebes flew in a series of formations, controlled by the new system of radio telephony, which allowed Peck to speak directly to his aircraft while in flight, rather than relying on hand signals or wing-waggling. A radio station on the ground also received the signals, and broadcast them over loudspeakers to the crowd, and they were relayed to the British Broadcasting Company, who transmitted them from their stations 2LO in London, and 5XX in Chelmsford. Later in the year Peck led No. 25 Squadron in the annual Army manoeuvres, attached to the forces of "Mercia" against "Wessex".

On 7 December 1926 Peck was posted to the Headquarters of RAF Iraq, and took command of No. 6 Armoured Car Company on 14 January 1927. On 25 April 1928 Peck was appointed commander of No. 55 Squadron, Iraq, and on 15 March 1929 received his second mention in despatches, "for distinguished services rendered in connection with the operations against the Akhwan in the Southern Desert, Iraq, during the period November 1927 – May 1928", from Air Vice-Marshal Sir Edward Ellington, Air Officer Commanding, British Forces in Iraq.

Peck returned to England in early 1929, where he was promoted to wing commander on 1 July 1929, and two weeks later, on 15 July, was posted to the Headquarters of the Air Defence of Great Britain to serve on the Air Staff. He left the ADGB on 19 August 1932, and was appointed Station Commander of RAF Northolt the following day, taking over from Wing Commander Keith Park. Peck was promoted to group captain on 1 July 1935, giving up command of Northolt on 3 November, and being appointed Senior Air Staff Officer at the Headquarters of RAF Far East at Singapore on 21 December.

== Second World War ==
Peck served in the RAF during the Second World War, and although he reached the mandatory retirement age on 25 April 1942, was re-employed, until reverting to the retired list at his own request on 8 September 1944.

== Awards and citations ==
Military Cross
Temporary Lieutenant (Temporary Captain) Arthur Hicks Peck, General List and Royal Flying Corps.

"For conspicuous gallantry and devotion to duty. He engaged single-handed three enemy aeroplanes, though they had superior height. He drove them back over their lines and prevented them from carrying out their reconnaissance."

Distinguished Service Order
Temporary Captain Arthur Hicks Peck, MC, General List and Royal Flying Corps.

"For conspicuous gallantry and devotion to duty. During two months aerial fighting he has never hesitated to attack the enemy when they were in superior numbers. On one occasion, when piloting a scout, he engaged a hostile formation consisting of four scouts and two two-seaters, completely dispersing them and driving one down out of control. His dash, resourcefulness and skill have been most marked."

Bar to Military Cross
Temporary Captain Arthur Hicks Peck, DSO, MC, Royal Flying Corps.

"For conspicuous gallantry and devotion to duty. While patrolling at a height of 14,000 feet he observed a formation of five enemy aircraft attempting a reconnaissance. He attacked the top machine, a scout, and drove it down out of control. He then attacked the second scout, which he also drove down out of control. He finally attacked a two-seater, and so quickly that he got to close quarters and opened fire with both guns. That, too, he sent down out of control. His performance was a splendid one, besides being costly for the enemy."
