= Thomas McCulloch =

Scottish-born Canadian Presbyterian minister, author and educator

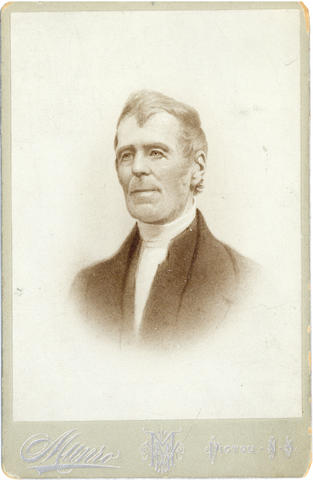
- Reproduction of a pastel drawing of Thomas McCulloch, c. 1840
- Born: September 1775
- Died: September 9, 1843 (aged 67–68)

Thomas McCulloch (September 1775 – September 9, 1843) was a Scottish-born, Presbyterian minister, author, educator, and education reformer. He was the founder and principal of Pictou Academy (pronounced pick-toe) and the first principal of Dalhousie College (now Dalhousie University) from 1838–1843. He is the author of The Stepsure Letters (1821-1823), considered to be the first major work of English Canada humour.

== Early life ==
Thomas McCulloch was born in Ferenese in the parish of Neilston in Renfrewshire (now East Renfrewshire), Scotland, the fourth child and second son of Elizabeth Neilson and Michael McCulloch and baptised on September 10, 1775. Michael McCulloch, a master block printer, died at age forty-six, leaving six children, five sons and one daughter, Andrew (d. April 8, 1854), John, Thomas, Mary Elizabeth (1765 – 1860), William (1776 – 1813), and George.

Elizabeth Neilson emigrated along with her family in 1803 to Nova Scotia. John died while sailing from Halifax to Pictou, Nova Scotia, William taught in the school at Pictou, and George, the youngest son, a cabinet maker, also lived in Pictou.

Elizabeth appears to have been a well-loved figure in the family, as Thomas McCulloch's wife, Isabella Walker, writes on Elizabeth's death,

Well was it for me that I was blessed with the example and motherly affection of our good old grandmother, in many unthought of trials in the land of strangers, and I fondly hope that the many, many, precious petitions presented at her Father's throne on our behalf will not remain without a special, a powerful return of saving mercy to our souls as a family, and as individuals. We were all near her heart, especially our eternal interests.

Thomas' son, William, writes of his grandmother,

Our annual gatherings at her house were a great treat, and nothing remains of our early recollections to dim the brightness of her character.

Little else is known of Thomas McCulloch's life prior to attending university.

== Education and early ministry ==
Thomas McCulloch was educated at the University of Glasgow, graduating in 1792. He studied medicine but "for reasons unknown" did not complete his studies, and entered into theology instead at the General Associate Synod in Whitburn. He studied divinity at Secession Divinity Hall at Whitburn, where he provided classes in Hebrew. At the completion of his studies, he was licensed by the Presbytery of Kilmarnock as a minister in 1799 and was ordained to the Secession Church at Stewarton.

McCulloch was interested in a variety of subjects and had a natural talent as a teacher. His son, William, describes him,

In stature Mr. McCulloch was about medium height, slightly built, light and active, and capable of enduring long continued physical strain. He was a clear and deep thinker, the result of combining the study of books with the study of men, and the spirit of the times. In preaching he possessed the faculty of readily grasping the main point of a subject, and connecting it with its varied lines of collateral thought and illustration, and in a style clear, terse, almost proverbial, conveying to the hearer just what he intended to say, nothing more nor less. The least intelligent could easily grasp his meaning, couched as it was in vigorous Saxon, and free from technical or high sounding words and phrases. Even when a lad, as he made some pointed statement of duty, and illustrated it, as was his wont, with a reference to the scenes of common life, the thought came, "Why did I not think of that?" But I did not think of it.

As a preacher,

He was quiet in the pulpit, using no gesture to emphasize his message. While such was the character of his ordinary ministrations it was especially at the Lord's table that his power manifested itself, when he seemed to forget everything, but the presence of his Master. His impassioned appeals, his glowing yet chastened eloquence, made the hearer almost feel as though "a door was opened in heaven."

During his studies and early ministry, McCulloch was supported by Rev. David Walker of the "Auld Light" Burgher congregation near Glasgow. It was during this time McCulloch met Walker's daughter, Isabella (1770 – October 9, 1847), and they were married on July 27, 1799 in Eastwood, Renfrewshire. The couple had nine children, three, Michael (1800 – 1881), Helen (1801 – 1875), and Elizabeth (1802 – 1834), were born in Scotland and emigrated with their parents. The other children include David (1805 – 1891), Isabella (1808 – 1883), Thomas (1808 – 1865), William (1811–1895), James (1819–1835), and Robert (1817 – 1817) who died in infancy.

He and Elizabeth Walker settled in Stewarton, Scotland on June 13, 1799.

== Life in Pictou ==
McCulloch stayed at Stewarton until 1803. At 28 years of age, due to "inadequate support" from the congregation and a call for ministers in the British colonies in North America, McCulloch left the congregation and was given an appointment by the Presbyterian church at Prince Edward Island. In August 1803, he and his wife and three children sailed from Clyde, Scotland for the colony. They didn't arrive until November 3 after a "long and stormy" voyage. Ships sailing to the Maritimes from Scotland often first landed in Pictou, Nova Scotia, a location where earlier Scottish settlers established a community.

Because of the weather, having arrived in winter, McCulloch and Walker decided to wait until spring before cross over to PEI. Seeing both a need for a local minister as well as a need for teacher, and as a result of personal petitions from the town, McCulloch and his family remained in Pictou. Several townspeople, "on seeing a pair of terrestrial and celestial globes," courted him to stay. McCulloch was inducted as "the minister of the 'Harbour' congregation of the Prince Street Church, Pictou" June 6, 1804. In Pictou, McCulloch also served justice of the peace as well as the town's physician at this time as Pictou was without a practising doctor.

Life in the town was primitive, as was the first dwelling for McCulloch and Walker,

On landing in Pictou the family occupied what would in these days be called a shanty or hut, on the street leading down to Deacon Patterson's wharf, but so miserable was the accommodation that it was almost a choice between the house and the snow covered street.

After considerable difficulty a change, if not improvement, was made by removing to what was known afterward as "McIntyre's house." It stood on Water St., two doors east of Robert Dawson's stone store. Though more pretentious, it was like the first, a mere shell. The house was designed for two families, but the partitions were mere unplaned boards with cracks so wide that the doings of one family were the common property of the other.

The town, so called, consisted of some fourteen houses, while the rest of the congregation were scattered through the surrounding country.

Even though a Presbytery had been established in Pictou in since 1797, McCulloch's stipend was not paid. As a result, with little food or money, McCulloch spent a great deal of time during this first winter gathering firewood. He also spent time acting as a physician, travelling to outlying areas to provide medical assistance, often by foot and without payment. The family moved to a shared house, and then building a new house, completed in 1806. This house remains as a historic house. In 1807, McCulloch visited Halifax and made a positive impression to the point he was asked to remain as a minister in local church, which he declined. McCulloch remained at Pictou for 35 years.

McCulloch contemporaries, both friend and foe, understood his rhetorical abilities, persuasion, and charm. Halifax's Morning Post in 1839, described McCulloch as "a man of vast mental attainments, and a profound investigator into the mysteries of nature", and "as one of the prominent leading minds that have given Nova Scotia some claim to literary distinction." The Novascotian, at the time edited by Richard Nugent, who was critical of McCulloch, described him as having

possessed an original and powerful intellect, which had been strengthened by attainments of a high order, he might, under more auspicious circumstances, have left something that would imperishably have connected his name with literature and science."

In 1824, McCulloch resigned as minister at Pictou to focus more fully on the academy as well as on education in the colony more directly.

== Pictou Academy ==
According to McCulloch's son, William, the idea for a seminary in Nova Scotia first came in 1804, "suggested itself like an inspiration." This inspiration arose for from:

- the obvious lack of trained ministers in the area;
- what McCulloch saw as a lack of basic understanding of Christian tenants;
- the fact that the only degree-granting school, King's College at Windsor, was an Anglican school and seminary;
- what McCulloch perceived as "the gross injustice of the Government toward [Presbyterian] Dissenters."

A first attempt to raise funds in 1807 resulted in only $1156.00, not enough to start or maintain a school.

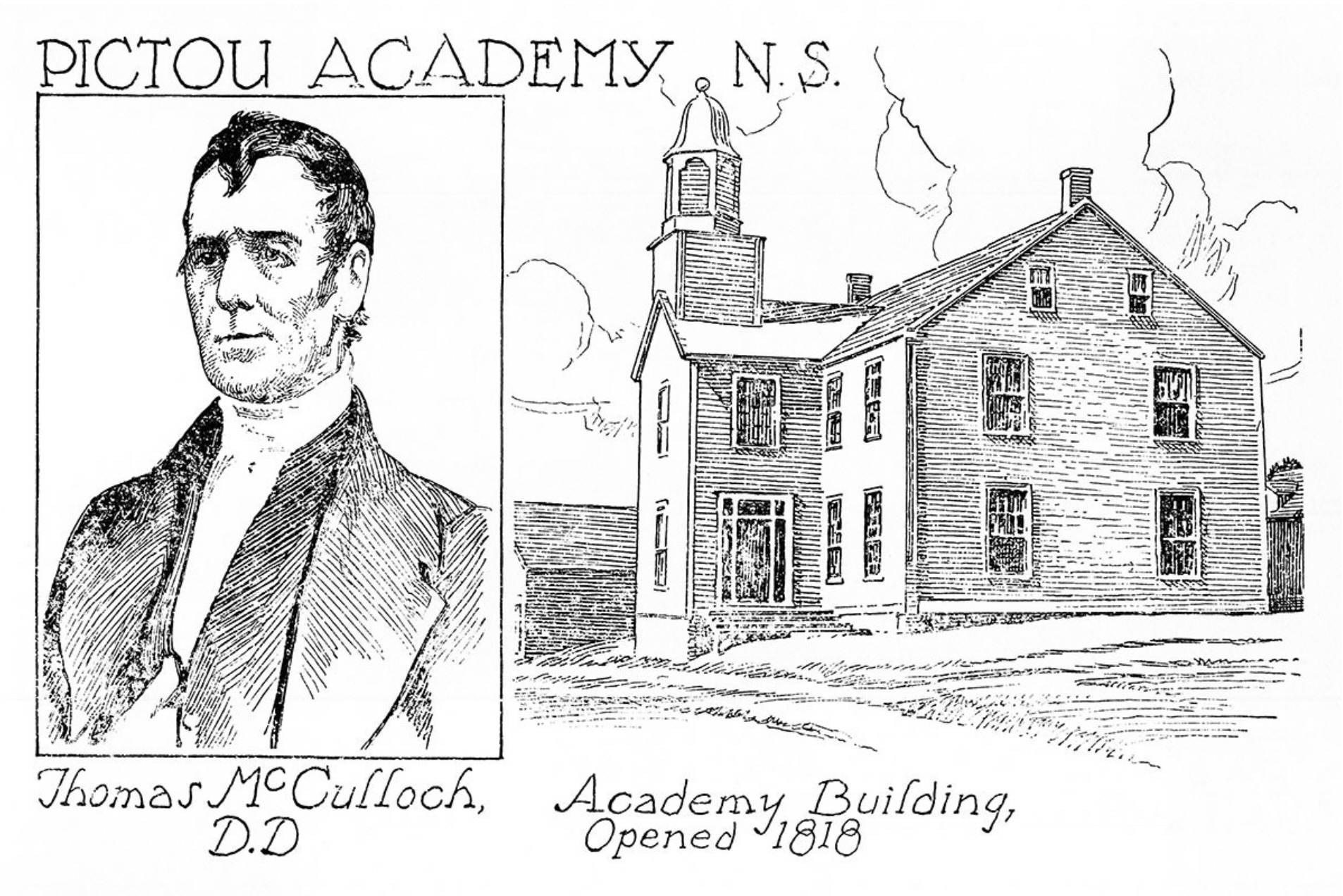
Thomas McCulloch and the Pictou Academy

Through much controversy, in 1808, McCulloch established a grammar school at Pictou in his home. The school quickly outgrew the home, as it became popular with families outside of Pictou, attracting students from neighbouring PEI and Cape Breton Island, as well as from British colonies in the Caribbean Islands. This led to its expansion, and a separate log building was constructed as the school's first separate building. The school was granted government funding only in 1811; prior to this, its operation relied on subscriptions from local residents. Through the Act to establish Grammar Schools in several Counties and Districts of this Province, Pictou Academy, as part of the "district of Pictou" was provided "the sum of one hundred and fifty pounds, annually, be included in the estimate of the ordinary expenses of the province...for the payment of the masters, tutors, and ushers thereof respectively." Students "shall be taught English grammar, the Latin and Greek languages, orthography, the use of the globes, and the practical branches of the mathematicks, or such other useful learning as may be judged necessary." This edict seemed to not have sat well with McCulloch, as he writes of his views on the purpose of education, specifically the teaching and use of language,

...instead of enabling [students] to display their pedantry by interlarding Latin and Greek phrases with the chit chat of life, it would be more profitable to give them an accurate acquaintance with the operation of their own minds, to teach them to classify their knowledge and communicate their sentiments, and to furnish them with those duties, and that knowledge of mathematical and physical science, which would be every day useful to the community and honourable to themselves.

In others words, think critically and reason for themselves.

In 1814, with a student body of 30-40 students, the log building was destroyed by fire. McCulloch then turned to the lieutenant governor in Halifax, who provided £100 to rebuild.

In 1815, McCulloch, with the support of James Mortimer, a leading Pictou merchant, formally established the Pictou Academy, which "on 25 March 1816 the House passed an 'Act for founding, establishing and maintaining an Academy at Pictou'" in Nova Scotia, receiving royal assent. What was significant in this Act was the condition on which it was founded: it "placed no denominational restrictions on students," though "required an oath of adherence from trustees and teachers to the established churches of England or Scotland." While McCulloch was not pleased with this restriction, he saw it as a temporary necessity. When Lord Dalhousie, then colonial governor, visited the Academy after its opening, where he remarked, that

it began to look and act like a college, its students were soon wearing the red gowns and caps familiar to McCulloch from the University of Glasgow.

While continuing to seek an agreement for a nondenominational board and permanent funding, McCulloch also sought degree-granting status for the Academy. This was chiefly stymied due to Lord Dalhousie's desire to create a third school in Halifax, and from opposition from King's College. As a result, in 1825, "the first three graduates of his divinity program" were sent to Scotland for examination at the University of Glasgow, "where they passed the qualifying examinations for the University of Glasgow with praise."

In 1831, Pictou Academy became the second degree-granting institution in the British colonies.

McCulloch was also shrewd, conciliatory, and aggressive in relationship with religious and political friends and adversaries, alike.

== Development of education in Nova Scotia ==
McCulloch, an important figure in English Canadian settler education, enters into the post-American Revolution British colonies as a champion of open, liberal, non-sectarian education. McCulloch sought to develop education accessible to all white settlers of any Christian religion. On arriving in Pictou, McCulloch stepped into a colony-wide religious, educational, and political quagmire. Education in the colony was broke along strict sectarian lines—Anglicans, which controlled the government, colonial finances, and the only degree-granting school in the colony—excluded Presbyterians and Presbyterians Dissenters, as well as of Baptists, Methodists, and other Protestant sects from the possibility of receiving a bachelor's degree or seminary teaching in Nova Scotia. McCulloch's position was clear: in his speech, The nature and uses of a liberal education (1819), on the opening of the Pictou Academy, McCulloch states, "...education communicates a dignity to the human character, which neither rank nor wealth is sufficient to purchase." His understanding of access to education was not simply broken down along sectarian lines; he believed that access to education was also divided by class as well as the contemporary understanding of individual learning,

it had been generally supposed that the person designed for mechanical employment, could derive little advantage from a liberal education. Progress in the arts of civilized life was thus left to that part of society, who, whatever mechanical habits of ingenuity they might acquire, possessed least of that intelligence which is the true basis of improvement.

Above all, McCulloch's theoretical and pedagogical approach to education was based in liberal education idea's of inquiry, development of the individual, and the betterment of society.

A liberal education, beside unfolding the principles of science, is particularly calculated to quality the mind both for the acquisition and the communication of knowledge. In every well regulated seminary [university], it is so conducted as to exercise the thinking powers; and, also, to connect the acquisition of knowledge with a corresponding improvement in the power of communication.

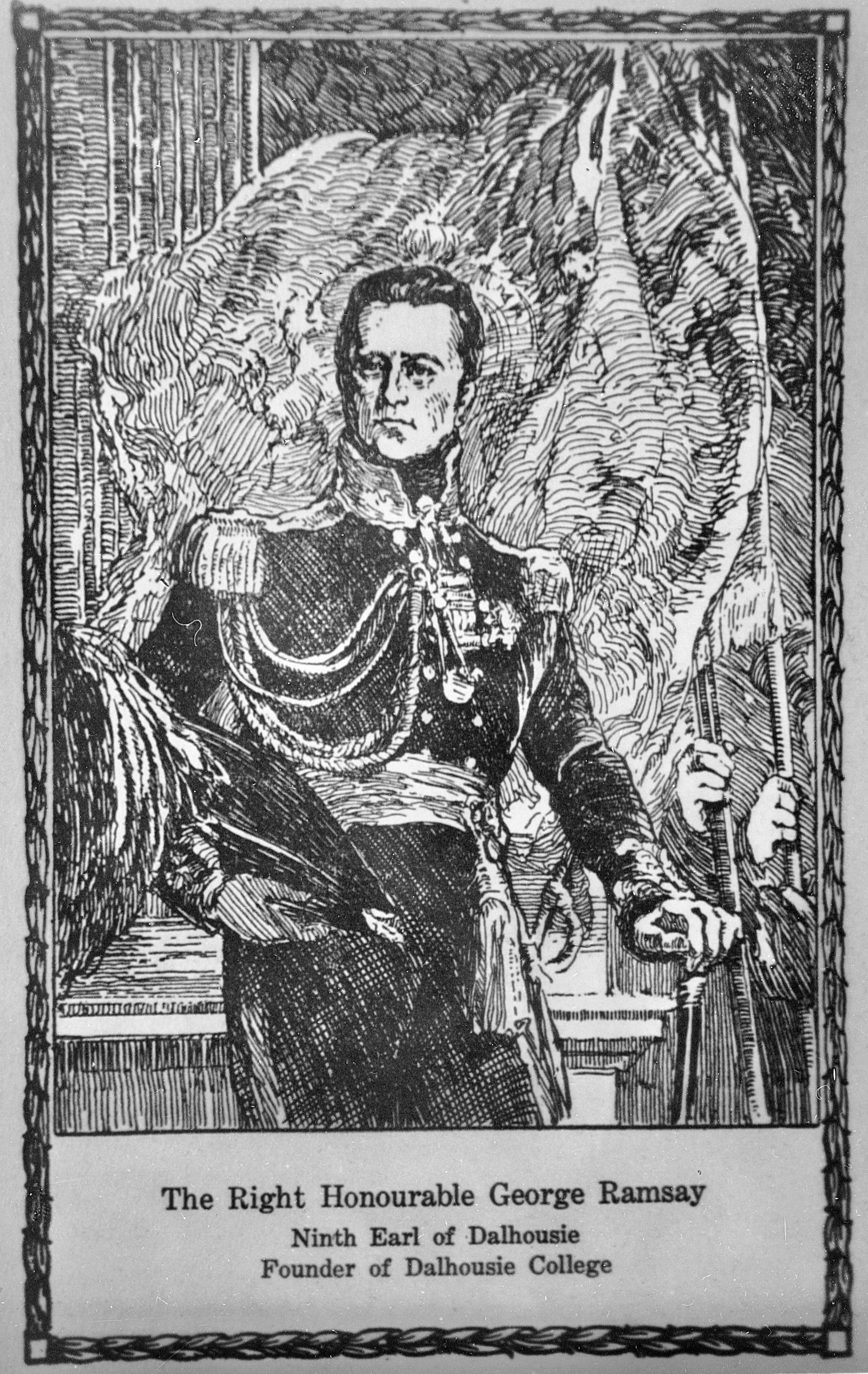
Dalhousie, George Ramsay, Earl of, 1770-1838

As Lord Dalhousie opined at the opening of Dalhousie University in 1820, Dalhousie

will be open to all who profess the Christian religion; to the youth of His Majesty's North American Colonies, to strangers residing here, to gentlemen of the military as well as the learned professions, to all, in short, who may be disposed to devote a small part of their time to study.

These views were as much a part of the Scottish Enlightenment as they were to the "preeminence in science of the University of Edinburgh in the late eighteenth century."

While McCulloch was as ardent an anti-Catholic, as he was against the Anglican church's monopoly on instruction in the colonies, especially in higher education. McCulloch was persuaded by Anglican Bishop, Charles Inglis, to participate in the 1804-10 pamphlet war between Protestants and Catholics in the colonies. McCulloch published the Popery Condemned by Scripture and the fathers (1808) against Edmund Burke, Roman Catholic Vicar General in Halifax, and the pamphlet, Popery again Condemned by Scripture and the fathers (1810). At the same time, he defended the Dissenters from the Anglican Church. In September 1813, he published a letter stating that all Dissenters, who made up the vast majority of the population, "were owed a 'quiet concession of those privileges which the law has sanctioned, as far as these are consistent with the rights of conscience and of civil society.'" He defended their rights to an education that wasn't based in Oxfordian (Anglican) principles.

To this end, the Pictou Academy is significant settler colonial education history, as it introduced non-sectarian education to the British colonies. McCulloch wished "to promote the means of a liberal education for persons of every religious denomination, who wish to improve their minds by literary studies," that was free from the "pedantry" of British Oxfordian education. McCulloch bluntly states, with some sardonic humour, "I believe the community will join me in affirming that...sound judgment is more valuable than a sackful of words." William McCulloch, McCulloch's son, later wrote that McCulloch's "plan was to make the pupil self-reliant by developing his powers, and thus fitting him to grapple with difficulties as they arose, working out for himself details".

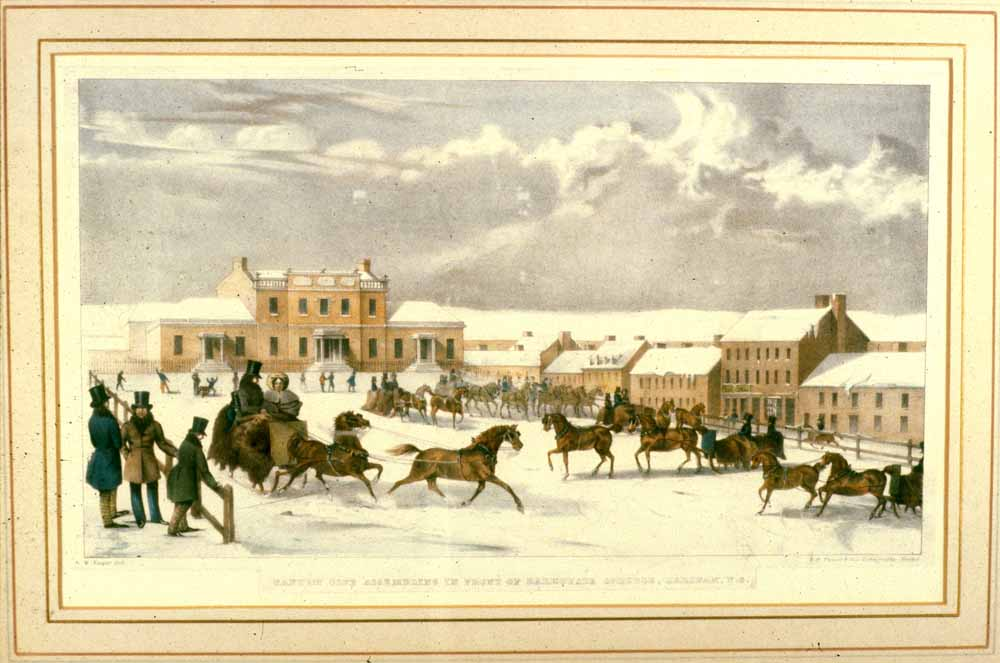
Tandem Club Assembling in Front of Dalhousie College, Halifax, N.S., 1839

Thomas McCulloch writes on the later founding of Dalhousie, "If Dalhousie College acquire usefulness and eminence, it will be not by an imitation of Oxford, but as an institution of science, and practical intelligence". His intentions for education are clear, as he writes that all schools "ought first to be ascertained, how far it is calculated to improve the community; and, if its general utility appear, it is, in proportion to its value and to the extent of the public funds, unquestionably entitled to the protection of Government, whether it belong to churchmen or dissenters, protestants or catholics, ought to be entirely disregarded!" Unfortunately for McCulloch, any unity between the Anglican oligarchy and the Dissenters and other Protestant groups was disrupted in his attempt to unite "all Protestant Nonconformists" in an alliance to further their rights in Nova Scotia. For McCulloch, "[t]he cause of liberal education became a key instrument in this new political strategy." The post-US rebellion period in Nova Scotia was difficult, as many thousands of refugees from the 13 colonies, which included hundreds of slaves, arrived in Halifax with little possessions or funds, and a severe housing shortage ensued. Many were held in with suspicion, and in this, McCulloch saw the same signs in Nova Scotia's governance that lead to the rebellion in the 13 Colonies, as well as that of the French Roman Catholics that lead to the French Revolution. McCulloch writes that it was the "irrational, authoritarian culture" of Roman Catholicism in France that lead to "its inevitable denouement in the French Revolution and subsequent Reign of Terror." To avoid a similar result for the province, McCulloch asserted acceptance Nonconformist ideology in a series of newspaper articles as a counter to the rigidity of the Anglican precepts. Students in Nova Scotia could only receive a degree from King's College, the only degree-granting institution, if students accepted the 39 Articles of Faith of the Anglican Church and not attend any Roman Catholic or "dissenting church" services.

For his work, McCulloch was labelled as a Republican and someone who fostered rebellion. This conflict continued for many years and was at the highest levels, directly involving the Archbishop of Canterbury (Patron of King's College) and the British King.

Part of McCulloch's stand was due to financing of education in the colony. The 1811 Grammar School Act recognized Pictou Academy, which received an annual grant of £150. At the same time, King's College received significantly more grant funding, as well as privileges of a royal charter. In 1782, a grant of 400 acres was made for King's College, in 1787 a grant of £200 was provided to establish the school, and a further £400 provided by the colonial legislature for salaries.

== Natural history education ==
McCulloch promotion of natural history education went beyond the theoretical and pedagogical. This is reflected in the lecture he gave at the opening of Pictou Academy, The Nature and Uses of a Liberal Education.

He actively collected Nova Scotia birds, animals, and plants and established a natural history museum at Dalhousie College. His bird collection attracted the attention of John James Audubon. He also undertook a series of lecture tours on scientific subjects for the general public, visiting Saint John, Charlottetown and towns in the Miramichi area. In 1830, Jotham Blanchard, a British MP, stated in the British House of Parliament,

...the only place of learning in the British Provinces to the best of my belief where the physical sciences are taught...[is at] The Pictou Institution... [it] is the only place where a useful and scientific Education can be had and consequently where persons of rational politics can be prepared to meet on general terms with those of contrary principles.

He was responsible for creating a chair of natural history at Dalhousie to teach "geology, mineralogy, botany, and zoology."

== Writing ==
McCulloch is the author of the Letters of Mephibosheth Stepsure, later known as The Stepsure Letters. The letters were first published in the Acadian Recorder from 1821 to 1823 and are considered to be the first major work of English Canadian humour. Writing as under the guise of Mephibosheth Stepsure, "[a]n orphan saddled with two lame feet and an impossible name," Stepsure provides a satirical commentary on the "at the 'folly and extravagance' of Stepsure's social-climbing neighbours." The writings are part political satire and social commentary through humour at the expense of Nova Scotians.

The characters in the letters were archetypes of the people of Nova Scotia of the period. In the style of satire, in Letter 1 (December 22, 1821), for example, he names the local minister, Parson Drone; the police, Constable Catchpole; the banker, Mr. Ledger; and the barman, Mr. Tipple. Parson Drone description:

The parson has been long among us, and is a very good sort of man; but, I believe, he has fared very hardly: for though my townsmen all respect him, and are the most active people in the world at selling watches and swapping horses, they have never made themselves richer and, therefore, have little to give but good wishes. But the parson, except when he is angry, is very good-natured and disposed to bear with a great deal; and, having acquired a large fund of patience himself, he has become a quack at comforting, and prescribes it indiscriminately for all sorts of ills. His own life has been spent between starving and preaching; and having no resources himself, it never occurred to him that, for the wants and troubles of others, there can be any remedy but patience.

While The Stepsure Letters were popular among white settlers, they included racist ideas regarding Africans in Nova Scotia, the vast majority of whom were trafficked there as slaves. This included, racists ideas of Africans as having "'natural' slave laziness and the 'natural inferiority of the negro.'"

In 1826, William Oliphant, an Edinburgh publisher, published McCulloch's novella, William and Melville, for which he "seems to have paid thirty guineas," which is approximately $6300.00 CDN (2024).

== Death and legacy ==
McCulloch died in Halifax on September 9, 1843 at the age of 67 after a short illness.

"He had spent the summer holidays in the western parts of the province, collecting specimens for a museum, which he and his son Thomas hoped to see established in Halifax; on his return, he had been struck down with influenza; but he was in his place on Monday, when college opened, and lectured for two hours on logic and moral philosophy."

Pictou Academy was name a National Historic Site in 1937. McCulloch was named a National Historic Person in 1959. His former home in Pictou is now operated as the McCulloch House Museum.

== Publications ==
- Popery condemned by scripture and the fathers: Being a refutation of the principal popish doctrines and assertions maintained in the remarks on the Rev. Mr. Stanser's examination of the Rev. Mr. Burke's letters of instruction ... Edinburgh: J. Pillans and Sons. 1808.
- Popery again condemned by Scripture and the Fathers: being a reply to a part of the popish doctrines and assertations contained in the remarks on the refutation, and in the review of Dr. Cochran's letters, by the Rev. Edmund Burke, V.G. Que. Edinburgh: A. Neill and Co. 1810.
- The Prosperity of the Church in Troublous Times, A Sermon Preached at Pictou, Friday, Feb'y 25th, 1814
- Words of Peace: Being an Address Delivered to the Congregation of Halifax in Connection with the Presbyterian Church of Nova Scotia, in Consequence of Some Congregational Disputes which Required the Interference of Presbytery. CIHM/ICMH collection de microfiches; no. 64428. Printed by E. Ward. 1817.
- McCulloch, Thomas; Holland, A. H.; m'Culloch, Thomas; Instititution, Pictou Academical (1819). The Nature and Uses of a Liberal Education Illustrated: Being a Lecture Delivered at the Opening of the Building, Erected for the Accommodation of the Classes of the Pictou Academical Institution.
- Gwendolyn Davies, ed. (1990). Mephibosheth Stepsure Letters. Ottawa: Carleton University Press. ISBN 978-0-7735-7345-1.
