= Charles Davidson (RAF officer) =

Scottish World War I flying ace

Charles Robert Davidson
- Born: 1896; Scotland
- Died: 21 May 1936 (aged 39–40); RAF Digby, Lincolnshire, England
- Military career
- Allegiance: United Kingdom
- Branch: British Army; Royal Air Force
- Service years: 1914–1936
- Rank: Squadron Leader
- Units: Highland Light Infantry; No. 14 Squadron RFC; No. 111 Squadron RFC; No. 20 Squadron RAF; No. 4 Squadron RAF; No. 2 Flying Training School
- Conflicts: World War I
- Awards: Military Cross

Squadron Leader Charles Robert Davidson MC (1896 – 21 May 1936) was a Scottish World War I flying ace credited with six aerial victories.

== Biography ==
=== World War I ===
Having served as a cadet in the Officers Training Corps Davidson was commissioned as a temporary second lieutenant in the Highland Light Infantry on 17 October 1914. He was seconded to the Royal Flying Corps in March 1916, initially as an observer, before being appointed a flying officer on 5 June 1917.

Davidson was posted to No. 14 Squadron in the Middle East, scoring his first victory with them, by driving down an enemy observation plane out of control at Beit Hanun on 23 September 1917, while flying a Vickers Bullet. He then transferred to No. 111 Squadron when it was founded as the fighter unit for the Middle East, and scored his second win on 4 October in a two-seater Bristol F.2 Fighter, which he also used for four more wins, between 17 and 29 December 1917. For one of these triumphs, fellow ace Frederick John Knowles manned the guns in the rear seat. Davidson's final score was three enemy planes forced to land and then destroyed, and three driven down out of control. He left 111 Squadron on 9 January 1918.

Listed as wounded on 7 February 1918, Davidson was promoted to lieutenant on 4 March 1918. In April 1918 his award of the Military Cross was gazetted, the citation reading:

Second Lieutenant (Temporary Lieutenant) Charles Robert Davidson, Highland Light Infantry, and Royal Flying Corps.
For conspicuous gallantry and devotion to duty. He forced a hostile aeroplane to land, and, descending to a low altitude, despite heavy rifle fire, shot down one of the occupants as he was escaping from the machine. On two later occasions, he forced an enemy machine to land, and drove down another, which was last seen diving into country in which it was impossible to land. Finally, though his ankle was fractured by a bullet during an air combat, he landed without injury either to his observer or his machine.

=== Post-war career ===
On 1 August 1919 Davidson was granted a permanent commission as a lieutenant in the RAF, resigning his Army commission in the Highland Light Infantry the same day. He was promoted to flight lieutenant in the King's New Years Honours, 1 January 1923.

Davidson was posted to No. 20 Squadron, based in India, on 23 November 1923 then to the Headquarters of RAF India on 8 July 1927.

He took part in Pink's War in Waziristan. His Medals include the India Star with the Clasp Waziristan which was only awarded to those who took part in Pink's war.

He returned to the UK and was posted to the RAF Depot, Uxbridge, on 4 December 1928. On 10 June 1929 he was posted to No. 4 Squadron, based at South Farnborough, and on 11 March 1931 was promoted to squadron leader.

Davidson was part of the RAF team that beat the Army in the Inter-Services Golf Championship held at West Hill in Woking in April 1931. On 5 June 1931 he was appointed to serve at the headquarters of RAF Transjordan and Palestine, based in Jerusalem, finally returning to the UK to serve as a flying instructor at No. 2 Flying Training School, based at RAF Digby, from 15 October 1934.

=== Death ===
Davidson was killed at RAF Digby on 21 May 1936 when he crashed in the Mignet HM.14 "Flying Flea" aircraft (registered on 4 February 1936 as G-AEBS) that he had built himself in the air station workshops. The "Flying Flea" was designed as a cheap and simple self-built aircraft for flying enthusiasts, but had a fatal flaw in its design, that could cause the aircraft to go into an uncontrollable dive if the pilot pushed the nose down to prevent a stall. Davidson was the third British pilot to die in a "Flying Flea" crash within a month, and the aircraft was eventually banned in the UK.

Squadron Leader Davidson is buried at the Church of the Holy Cross, Scopwick, Lincolnshire.

_{Personal Life}

He Married Doris Davidson ( née Heilbron) Daughter of Joseph Heilbron of Breda Holland. Doris Davidson did not remarry following Charles's Death
