= Austin Lloyd Fleming =

Canadian flying ace

- Born: 7 August 1894; Toronto, Ontario, Canada
- Died: 26 January 1969 (aged 74); Málaga, Spain
- Burial place: Mount Pleasant Cemetery, Toronto
- Military career
- Allegiance: United Kingdom
- Branch: British Army; Royal Air Force
- Service years: 1916–1919; 1939–1942
- Rank: Flight Lieutenant
- Units: No. 46 Squadron RFC; No. 111 Squadron RAF
- Conflicts: First World War; Second World War
- Awards: Military Cross

Austin Lloyd Fleming, MC (7 August 1894 – 26 January 1969) was a Canadian flying ace of the First World War. He was credited with eight aerial victories.

== Early life ==
Austin Lloyd Fleming was born on 7 August 1894 in Toronto, Ontario. His parents were Lydia Jane Orford and Robert John Fleming. He was a stockbroker before the First World War.

== First World War ==
After joining military service on 10 November 1916, Fleming transferred from the Duke of Cornwall's Light Infantry to the General List of the Royal Flying Corps on 13 May 1917. He was appointed as a flying officer, with the rank of second lieutenant on probation on 16 May 1917, signifying that he had completed pilot's training. On 8 June 1917, he was assigned to No. 46 Squadron RFC. He was reassigned to No. 111 Squadron RFC in Palestine later that year, following a "friendly fire" incident in which an aircraft from No. 1 Squadron RFC was shot down and the pilot, Second Lieutenant Tom Littler, was killed.

Between 17 January and 12 April 1918, Fleming scored eight aerial victories (listed below). His exploits gained him the Military Cross, although the award citation did not recognize all his feats. The award was gazetted on 13 May 1918, reading:

Temporary Lieutenant Austin Lloyd Fleming, Royal Flying Corps: For conspicuous gallantry and devotion to duty. He attacked a formation of three enemy machines, and forced the leading machine, which was a two-seater, to land, although the other two were attacking him from behind. He then attacked and destroyed another of the enemy machines, and engaged the third, which succeeded in escaping. He destroyed four enemy machines during one month, and showed splendid courage and skill on many occasions.

On 11 September 1918, Fleming was injured.

== List of aerial victories ==
No.	Date/time	Aircraft	Foe	Result	Location	Notes
1	17 January 1918 @ 0920 hours	Bristol F.2 Fighter serial number A7192	Enemy two-seater	Destroyed	Kalikieh	Observer/gunner: Frederick John Knowles
2	18 January 1918 @ 1130 hours	Bristol F.2 Fighter s/n A7198	Enemy two-seater	Destroyed	Between Jaffa and Arsuf	Observer/gunner: Frederick John Knowles; victory shared with another air crew
3	23 January 1918 @ 1145 hours	Royal Aircraft Factory SE.5a s/n B538	Albatros D.III	Destroyed	Tul Keram	
4	24 January 1918 @ 1130 hours	Royal Aircraft Factory SE.5a s/n B538	Enemy two-seater	Destroyed	Northwest of Tul Keram	
5	29 January 1918 @ 1530 hours	Royal Aircraft Factory SE.5a s/n B538	Enemy two-seater	Captured	Southwest of Junction Station	Pilot KIA; observer taken POW
6	10 March 1918 @ 0930 hours	Royal Aircraft Factory SE.5a s/n B540	Albatros D.III	East of al-Bireh		
7	12 April 1918 @ 0715 hours	Royal Aircraft Factory SE.5a s/n B6242	Albatros D.V	Driven down out of control	Tul Keram	
8	12 April 1918 @ 0720 hours	Royal Aircraft Factory SE.5a s/n B6242	Albatros D.V	Driven down out of control	Tul Keram	

== Second World War, retirement and death ==
On 1 June 1919, Fleming was transferred to the unemployed list of the Royal Air Force, ending his service. He subsequently spent some years in the United States before moving to Britain.

With the advent of the Second World War, Fleming returned to military service in the Royal Air Force. On 1 September 1939, he appointed as a flight lieutenant. He served until 1 August 1942, when he once again gave up his commission and left the RAF.

In 1959, Fleming presented No. 111 Squadron a souvenir machine gun taken from the reconnaissance craft he captured on 29 January 1918.

Fleming died in Málaga, Spain, on 26 January 1969. He was buried in Mount Pleasant Cemetery, Toronto, and survived by his wife, Helen Hyde Fleming, and twin children, Bob and Louis.
