= McCulloch House Museum =

Historic house in Nova Scotia, Canada

Coordinates: 45.6775°N 62.7229°W

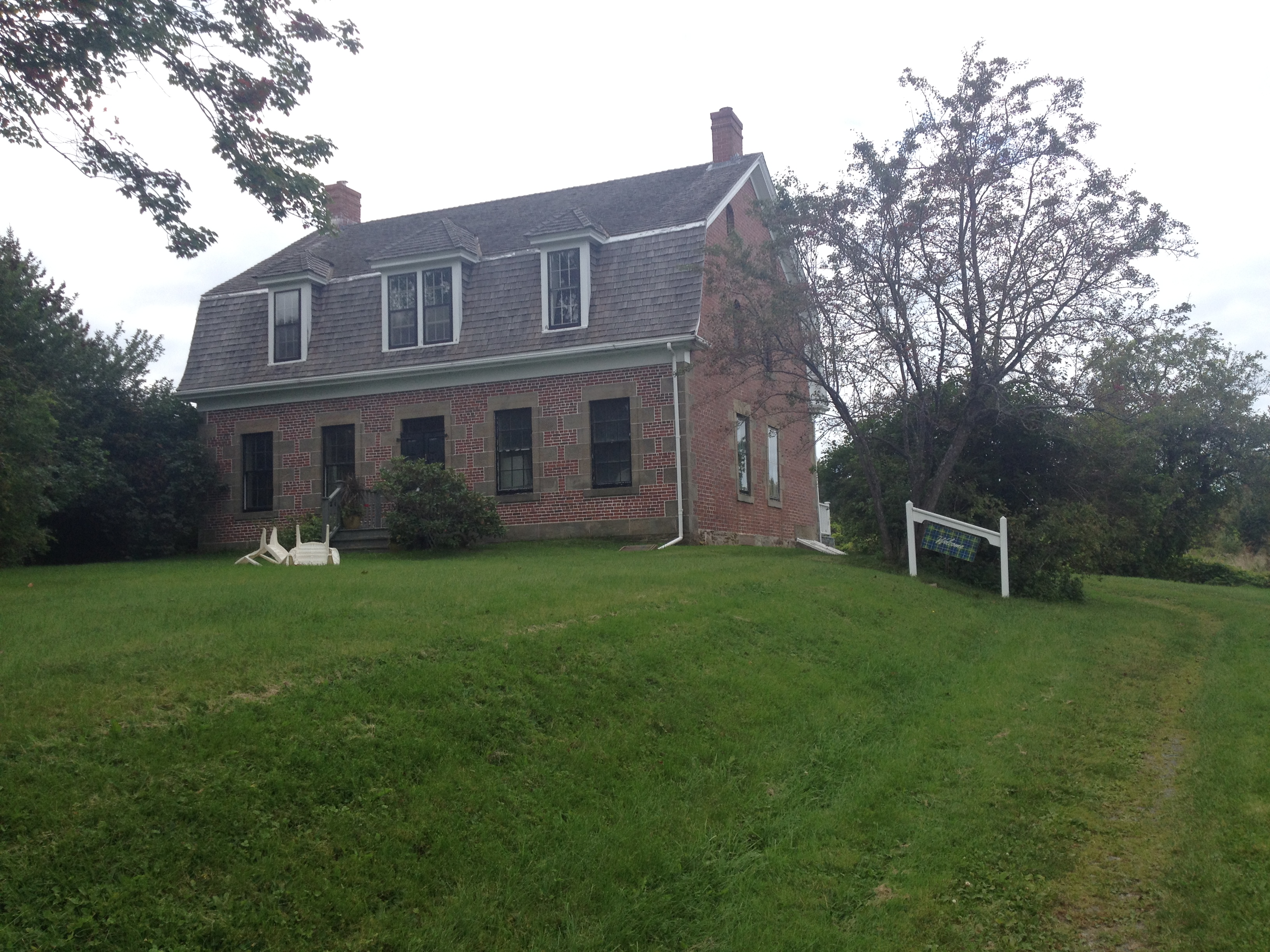
- McCulloch House Museum and Genealogy Centre
- Location: 100 Haliburton Road; Pictou, Nova Scotia, Canada
- Type: Heritage Buildings
- Website: www.mccullochcentre.ca

The McCulloch House Museum in Pictou, Nova Scotia, boasts interpretive materials designed to tell the story of Thomas McCulloch and his roles in education and politics in Pictou in the early 19th century. As well, the McCulloch House museum is host to a large collection of artifacts, many being Dr. McCulloch's personal belongings from his educating days. The museum is affiliated with the adjacent Genealogy Centre, formerly known as the Hector Exhibit Centre and Archives. Both are administered by the Pictou County Genealogy and Heritage Society.

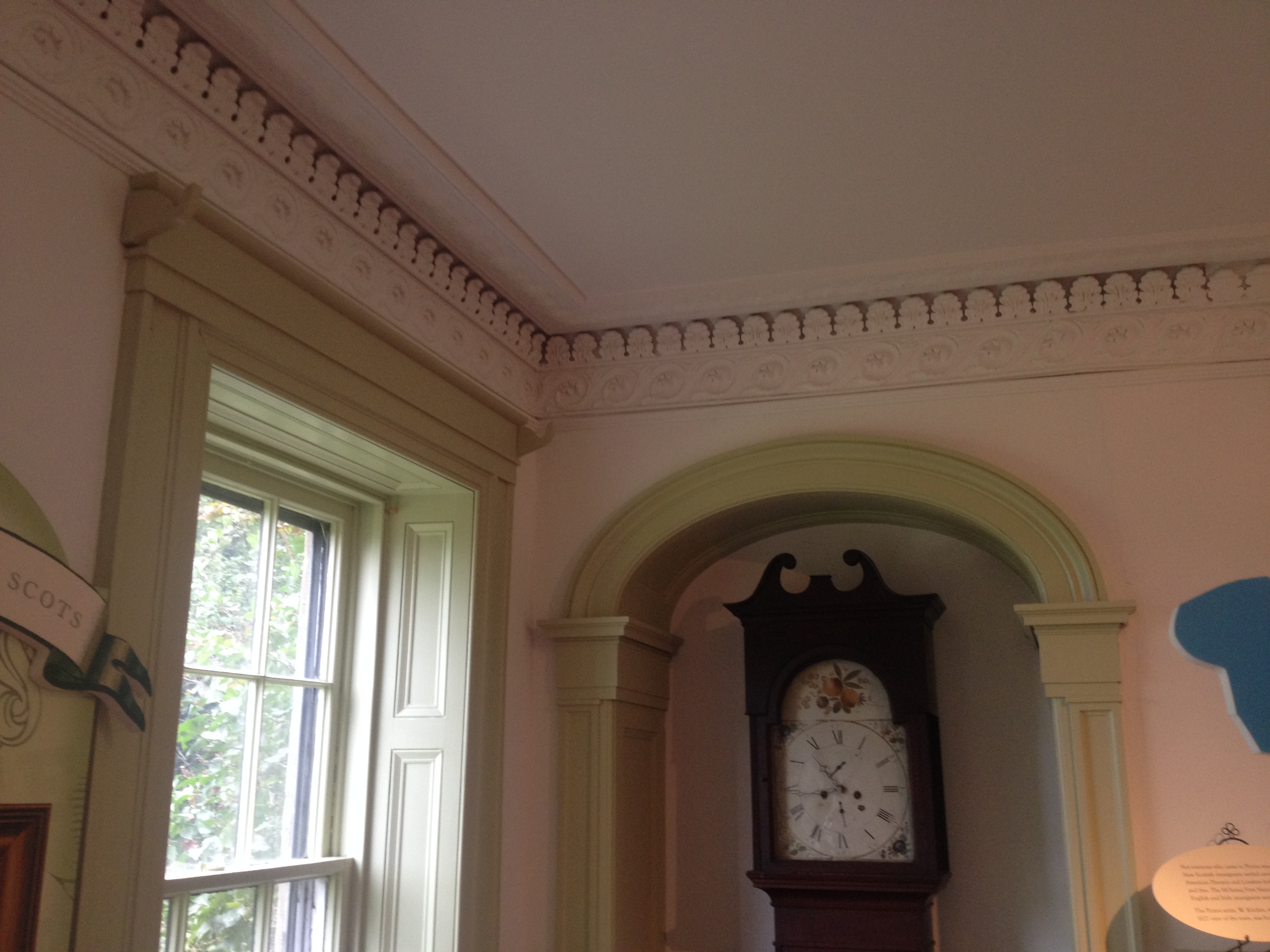
Some of the detailed trim inside the house

The house is listed on the Canadian Register of Historic Places, and is built of brick with sandstone accents. It was built by McCulloch circa 1806 as a 1 1/2-story cottage, situated on top of a knoll overlooking Pictou Harbour. In about 1890 a gambrel roof and dormer were added.

The museum was closed in the late 1990s for structural repairs. It reopened in 2006 with new interpretation and exhibits.
