= Pictou =

Municipality in Nova Scotia, Canada

Pictou Piktuk (Mi'kmaq) Baile Phiogto (Scottish Gaelic)
- Town
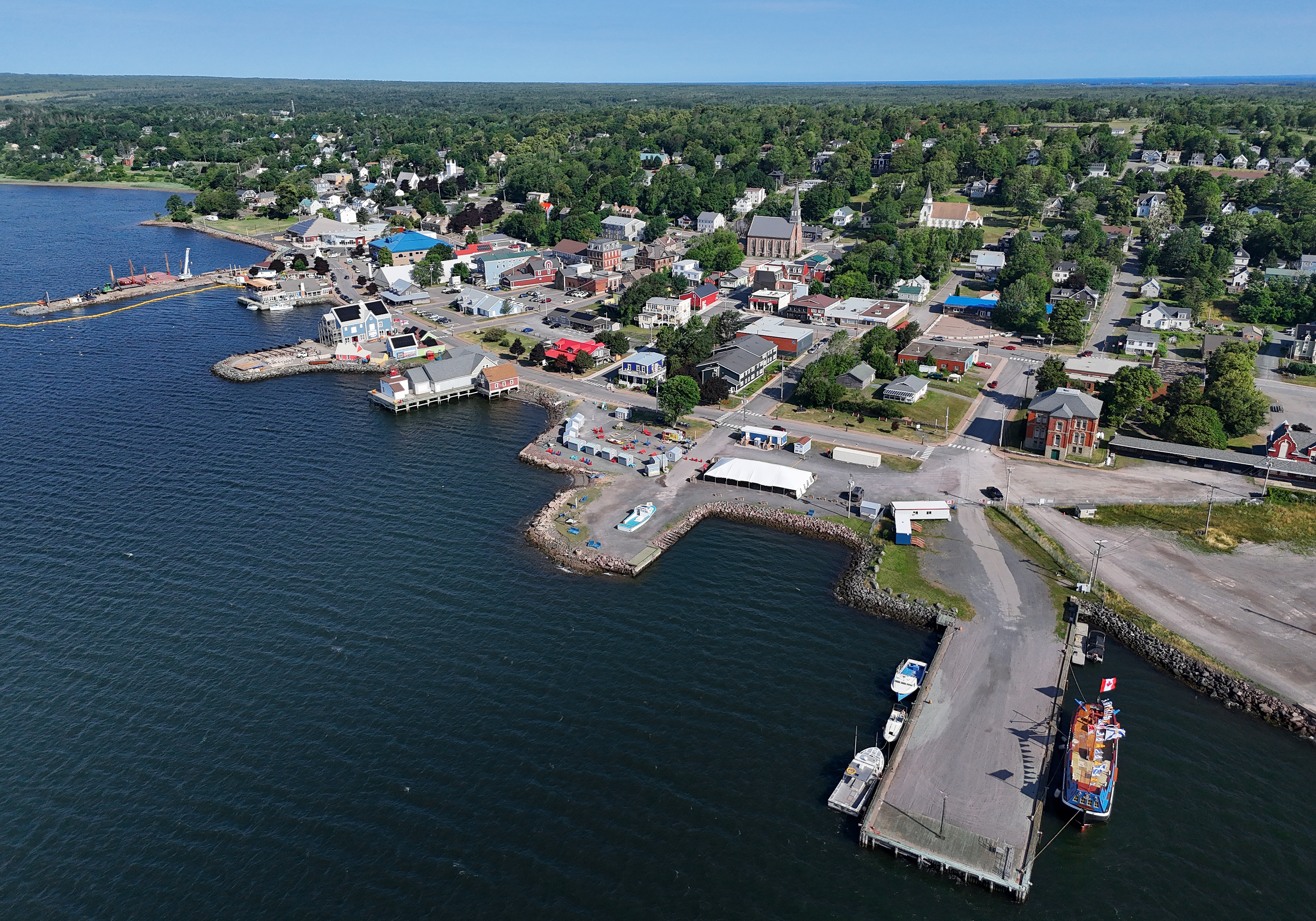
- Pictou

- Coat of arms
- Nickname: Birthplace of New Scotland
- Motto: "As constant as the northern star"
- Location of Pictou
- Coordinates: 45°40′53″N 62°42′43″W
- Country: Canada
- Province: Nova Scotia
- County: Pictou County
- Founded: 1767
- Incorporated: April 30, 1873

Government
  - Body: Pictou Town Council
  - Mayor: Jim Ryan
  - MLA: Marco MacLeod (PC)
  - MP: Sean Fraser (L)

Area (2021)
  - Total: 7.99 km^{2} (3.08 sq mi)
- Highest elevation: 54 m (177 ft)
- Lowest elevation: 0 m (0 ft)

Population (2021)
  - Total: 3,107
  - Density: 388.7/km^{2} (1,007/sq mi)
- Demonym: Pictonian
- Time zone: UTC-4 (AST)
  - Summer (DST): UTC-3 (ADT)
- Postal code: B0K
- Area code: 902
- Telephone exchange: 485
- Median earnings*: $55,600
- NTS Map: 11E10 New Glasgow
- GNBC Code: CBDPK
- Website: www.townofpictou.ca
- Median household income, 2020 ($, all households); Places in Nova Scotia

Pictou (/ˈpɪktoʊ/ PIK-toh; Canadian Gaelic: Baile Phiogto; Mi'kmaq: Piktuk) is a town in Pictou County, in the Canadian province of Nova Scotia. Located on the north shore of Pictou Harbour, the town is approximately 10 km (6 miles) north of the larger town of New Glasgow.

Once an active shipping port and the shire town of the county, today Pictou is a local service centre for surrounding rural communities and a tourist destination in this region of Nova Scotia.

The name Pictou derives from the Mi'kmaq name Piktuk, meaning 'explosive place', a reference to the river of pitch that was found in the area, or perhaps from methane bubbling up from coal seams below the harbour. The surrounding region formed one part of the Mi'kmaw district Epekwitk aq Piktuk, one of the seven districts of Mi'kma'ki.

== History ==
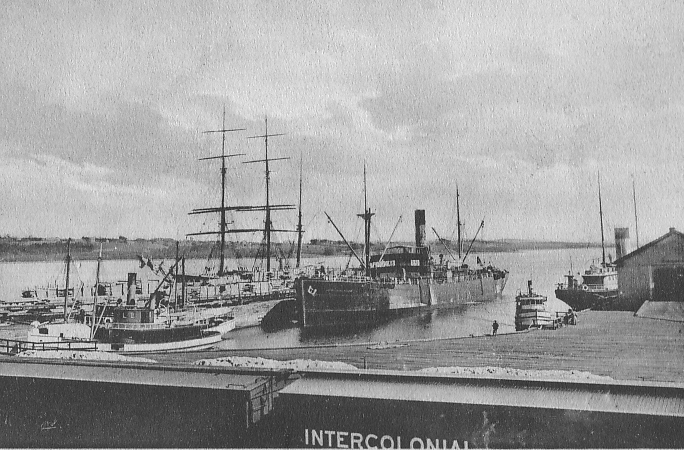
Intercolonial Railway cars dockside in Pictou, c. 1912

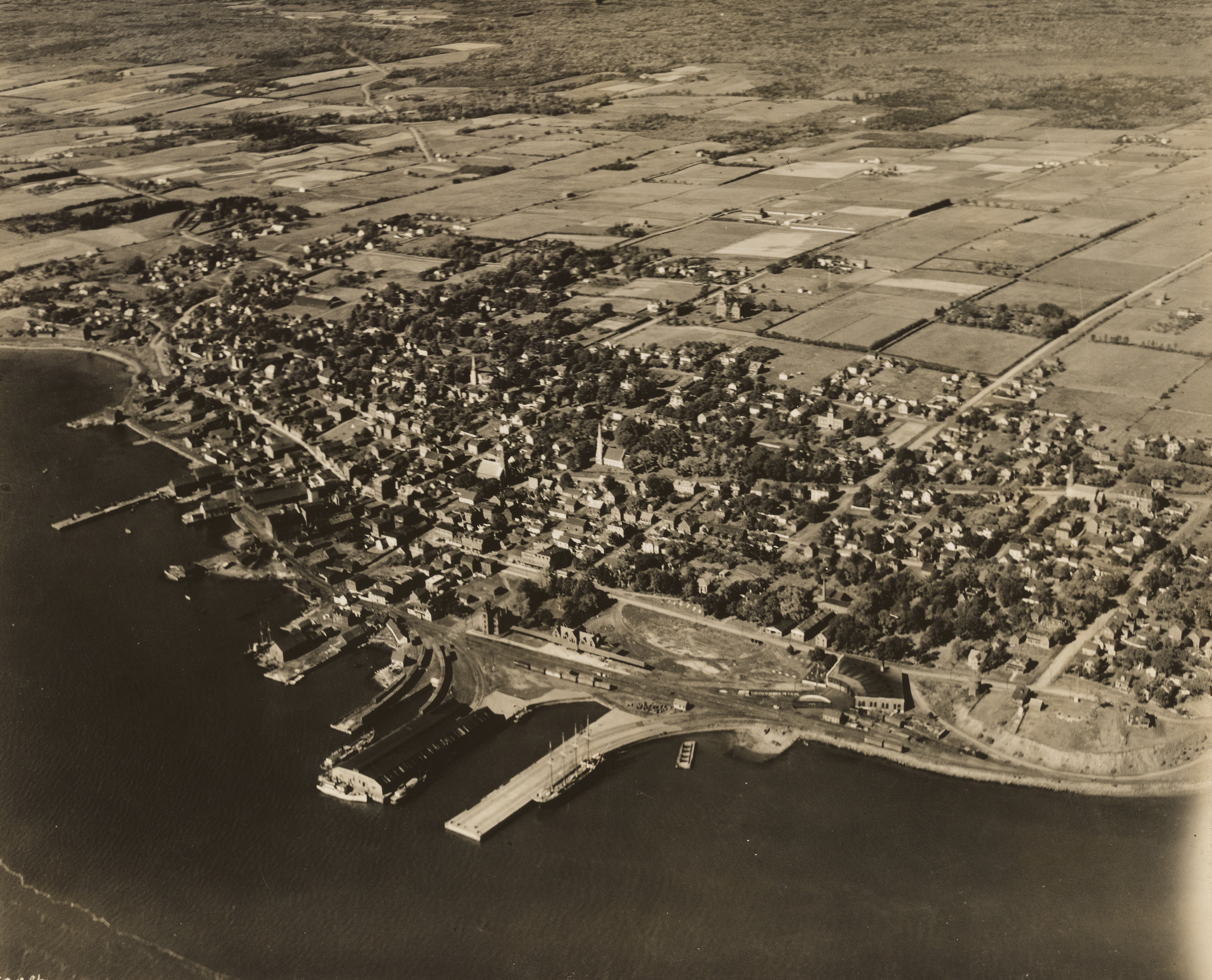
Aerial view of Pictou, 1924

Pictou was the location of an annual Mi'kmaq summer coastal community prior to European settlement. Pictou is part of the Epekwitk aq Piktuk Mi'kmaw district, which also includes Prince Edward Island.

The town was a receiving point for many Scottish immigrants moving to a new home in northern Nova Scotia and Cape Breton Island following the Highland Clearances of the late 18th and early 19th centuries. The first wave of immigrants arrived on September 15, 1773, on the Hector. While there were a significant number of Scottish people settled in other parts of Nova Scotia at the time Pictou was settled, the town's tourism slogan is "The Birthplace of New Scotland", which is based on it being the first primarily made up of Scottish immigrants, and the ship Hector being recognized as the first immigrant ship to sail directly from Scotland to what is now Canada. Pictou contains many examples of stone housing constructed by those early generations of Scottish immigrants, which have clear connections to architectural styles and designs in Scotland itself.

When the Hector arrived, there were already a few families in Pictou that had arrived on the Betsy six years earlier. The town has an indirect connection to Scottish settlement in New Zealand; the Reverend Norman McLeod emigrated to Pictou from Scotland some years after the Hector but eventually re-settled with his parishioners at St. Ann's on Cape Breton Island. He later encouraged his parishioners to move to Waipu where there are still many descendants from Pictou and St. Ann's.

During the American Revolution, in November 1777 at Pictou, American privateers from Machias, Maine captured the ship Molly, under the command of Captain William Lowden. Local resident Wellwood Waugh was implicated in the raid on Pictou and was forced to move to Tatamagouche, Nova Scotia. He became a prominent inhabitant and Waugh River is named after him.

In 1812 Sir Hector Maclean (the 7th Baronet of Morvern and 23rd Chief of Clan Maclean) emigrated to Pictou from Glensanda and Kingairloch in Scotland with almost the entire population of 500. Hector is buried in the town's cemetery.

During the latter part of the 19th century, Pictou's industrial sector gained strength. The Intercolonial Railway was built to the town on a spur from the Stellarton–Oxford Junction Short Line. Shipbuilding increased through the 19th century, particularly with the increase in coal being shipped from Pictou Landing, Abercrombie and the East River of Pictou. A number of shipyards have been continuously established in the town since this period. A notable shipbuilding accomplishment was the speedy construction of 24 Park ship freighters by the newly created Pictou Shipyard in World War II. After the war the shipyard continued operation building many fishing trawlers and ferries. The port's cargo activity increased after the nearby Scott Maritimes pulp mill opened in Abercrombie in 1965. CN Rail abandoned its service to the town in the late 1980s but other transportation – including Highway 106 (the Trans-Canada Highway) – opened in the 1970s to provide alternatives.

== Demographics ==
Historical population
Year	Pop.	±%
1881	3,403	—
1891	2,998	−11.9%
1901	3,235	+7.9%
1911	3,179	−1.7%
1921	2,988	−6.0%
1931	3,152	+5.5%
1941	3,069	−2.6%
1951	4,259	+38.8%
1956	4,564	+7.2%
1961	4,534	−0.7%
1981	4,621	+1.9%
1986	4,413	−4.5%
1991	4,134	−6.3%
1996	4,022	−2.7%
2001	3,875	−3.7%
2006	3,813	−1.6%
2011	3,437	−9.9%
2016	3,186	−7.3%
2021	3,107	−2.5%

In the 2021 Census of Population conducted by Statistics Canada, Pictou had a population of 3,107 living in 1,452 of its 1,600 total private dwellings, a change of −2.5% from its 2016 population of 3,186. With a land area of 7.99 km^{2} (3.08 sq mi), it had a population density of 388.9/km^{2} (1,007.1/sq mi) in 2021.

== Education ==
Pictou Academy is the town's high school and was founded in 1803 by Dr. Thomas McCulloch, who was travelling to his new clergy posting on Prince Edward Island. He was convinced to stay the winter and ended up remaining in Pictou for much longer. Disappointed by the lack of education among Pictonians, McCulloch decided to start a school. There was considerable argument between McCulloch and Nova Scotia's provincial government for funding, however it finally became a reality in 1816 when the Pictou Academy was incorporated. The province of Nova Scotia would not let it be named a college, but it was a school of higher education (senior matriculation) which was open to people of every race and denomination.

Between 1816 and the present, Pictou Academy has been in four separate buildings. The school was moved from its original building to a new site, while the second and third buildings both burned down. There were Academy graduates from every year since it was incorporated, excluding the years between several of its different buildings.

At the start of the 2003–2004 school year, all high schools in Pictou County were closed, and their students began going to two new schools, Northumberland Regional High School and North Nova Education Centre. The only exception to this is Pictou Academy, which continues to operate.

The town operates a small library and a Community Access Program site.

== Attractions ==
=== Events ===
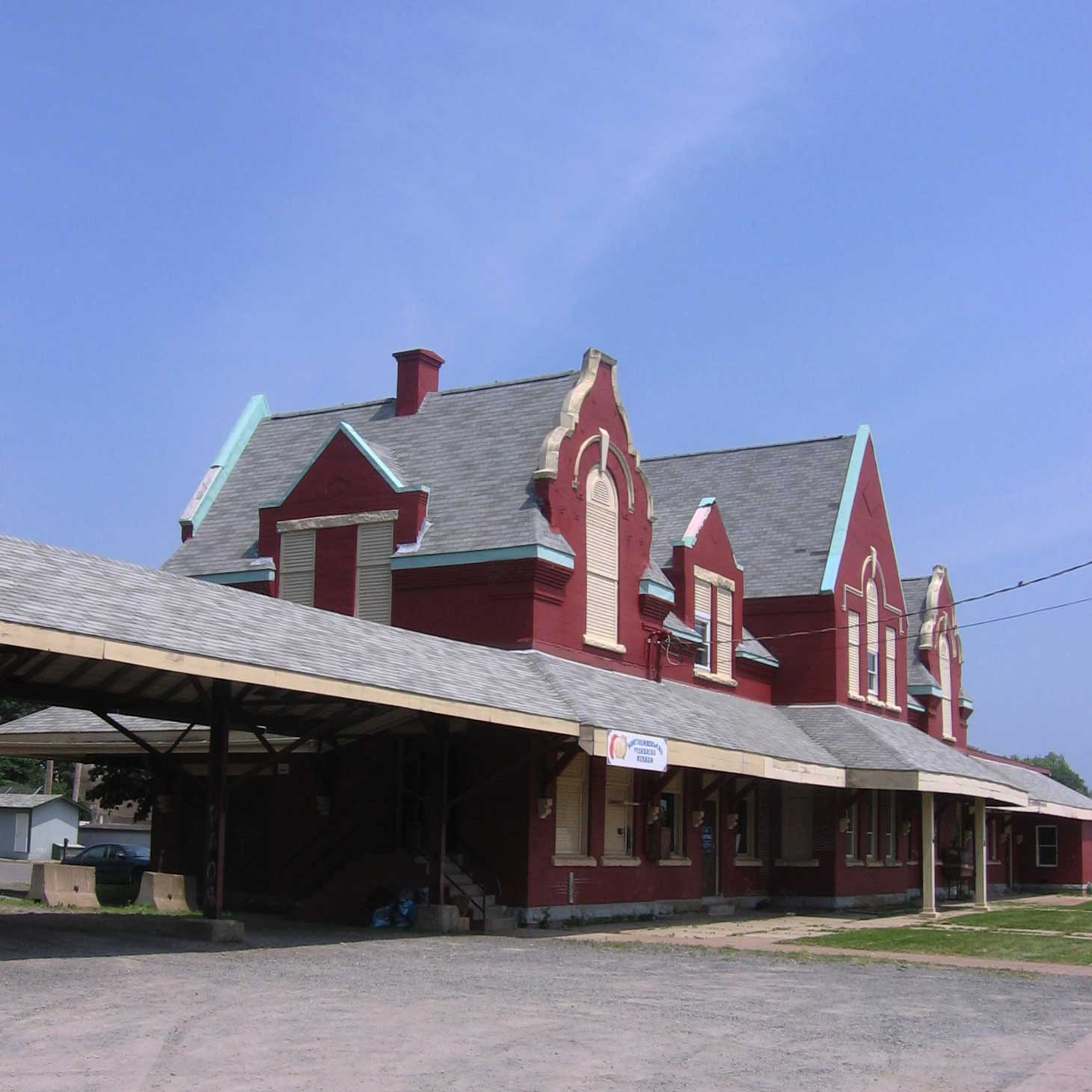
The former train station in Pictou

The Pictou Lobster Carnival takes place annually in early July at the old train station, and the waterfront. The Lobster Carnival is a yearly event celebrating the end of the fishing season and has been celebrated since 1934. The carnival includes a midway, 'Rock the Lobster' concerts, a pageant, breakfasts, a car show, fireworks, a beer garden, crate runs, hauling/net cutting contests, boat races, and lobster dinners. As of 2024, it is the longest-running active lobster festival in North America. It draws thousands to the town annually for the event.

The town also used to host a large celebration for Ship Hector Festival in August. This ended in the early 2010s, although there are still New Scotland Days celebrations in September. The celebrations centre on the ship Hector and include a Celtic church service and a descendants reunion.

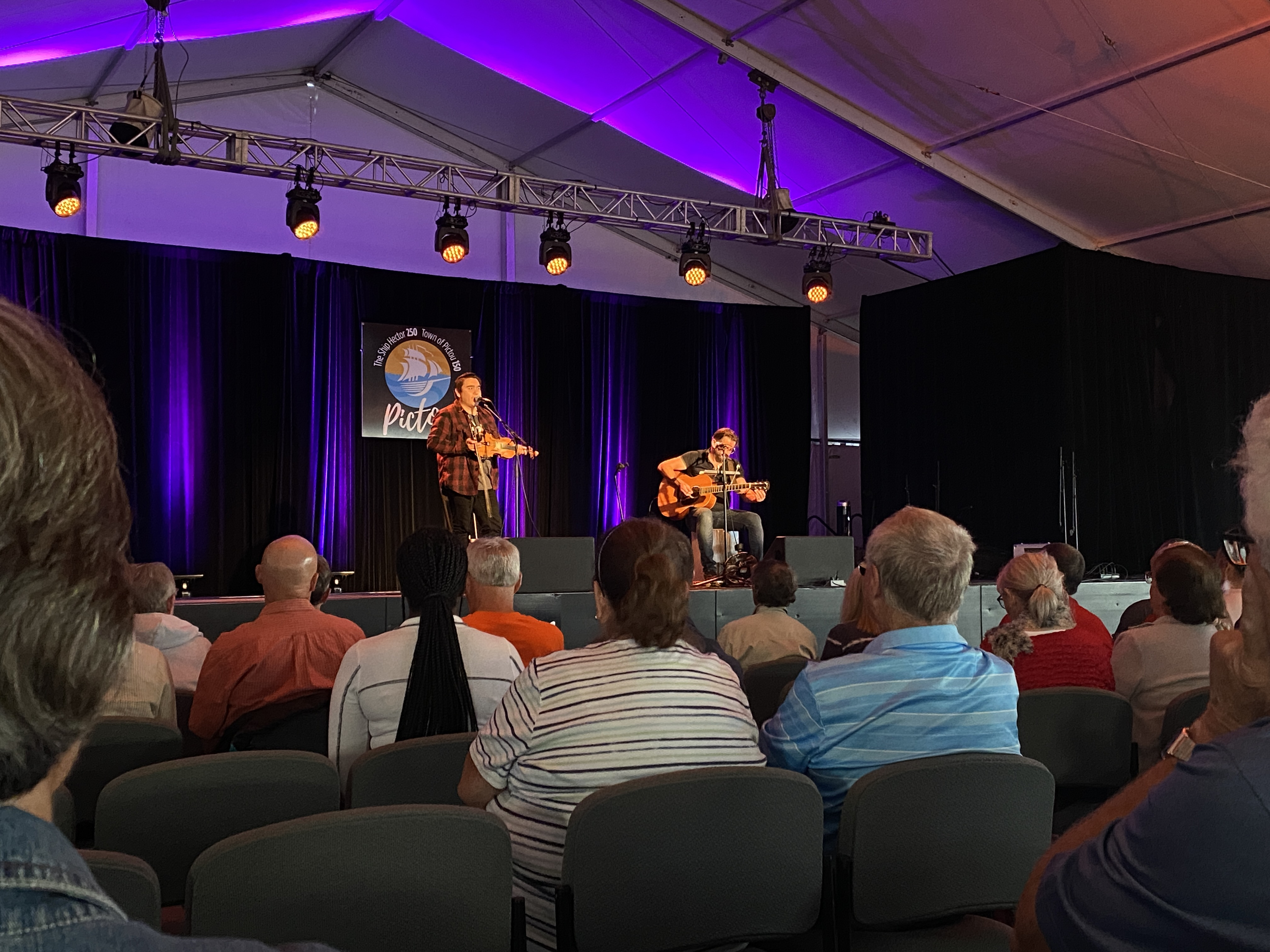
Morgan Toney concert for the 250th Anniversary celebrations

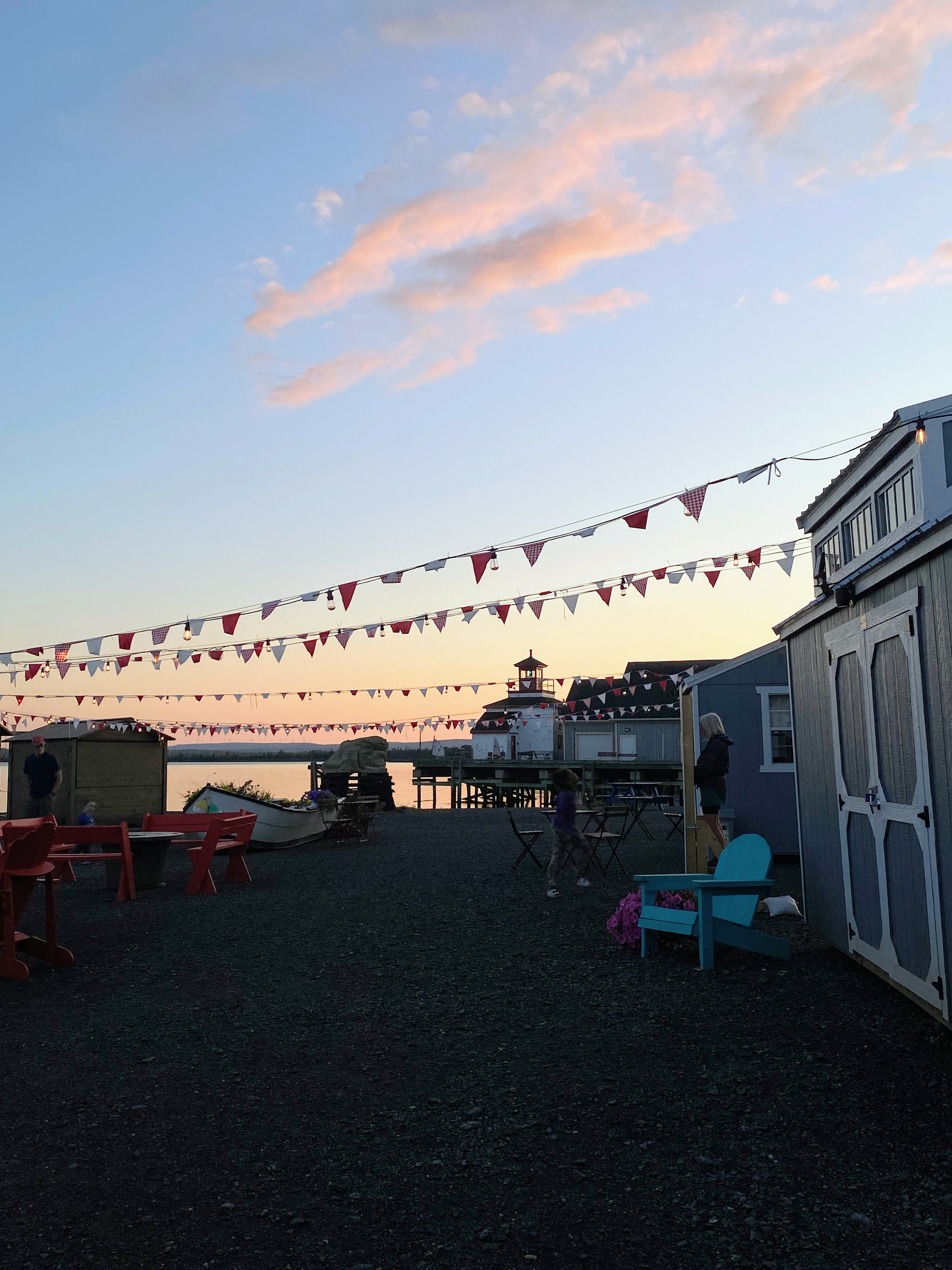
Vendor village market set up in Pictou for celebrations

In 2023, for the 250th Anniversary of the landing of the Ship Hector, the town received federal and provincial funding to support a three-month long celebration. The main celebrations consisted of evening concerts on a waterfront stage, a daily vendor market, the rededication of the No. 2 Construction Battalion monument, the church service, descendants reunion, the Voyage musical about the Hector, and a visits from the Governor General of Canada and the Lieutenant Governor of Nova Scotia. The headliners for the concerts included Ashley MacIsaac, Cassie & Maggie, Terra Spencer, Mary Beth Carty, Ray Stewart, Amelia Parker, Christina Martin, Jud Gunning, Steve MacIntyre, Morgan Toney, Darren McMullen, Rachel Davis, Rum Ragged, Terry Kelly, DeeDee Austin, and The Barra MacNeils.

=== Museums ===
The primary tourist attraction in Pictou is the waterfront along Pictou Harbour. During the 1990s–2000s, industrial land on the Pictou waterfront was redeveloped with the centrepiece being construction of the replica tall ship Hector. Now completed, the ship is docked each summer at the Hector Heritage Quay, an interpretive centre that includes three floors of exhibits, as well as access to the floating replica. From 2020 to 2024. Next door to the Hector Heritage Quay is the Northumberland Fisheries Museum, Lobster Hatchery, and Lighthouse Museum.

Grohmann Knives, the only knife manufacturer in Canada, has been the sole producer of D. H. Russell Belt Knives and Grohmann Kitchen Knives for over 50 years. Free factory tours of the plant are offered to the public on Water Street.

The McCulloch House Museum on the edge of downtown offers an archives and research centre and a nineteenth-century house museum.

=== Architecture ===
Besides the museum aspect of the McCulloch House, the 19th century home once belonged to Thomas McCulloch. It is one of many examples of centuries-old houses in Pictou. The downtown is home to several 'Scottish' designed buildings that include locally sourced sandstone and five-sided dormers.

The waterfront redevelopment also features a marina and small boardwalk that connects to the Trans-Canada Trail. The historic Intercolonial Railway station on the waterfront has been restored and connects to the waterfront by the old customs house.

=== Other ===
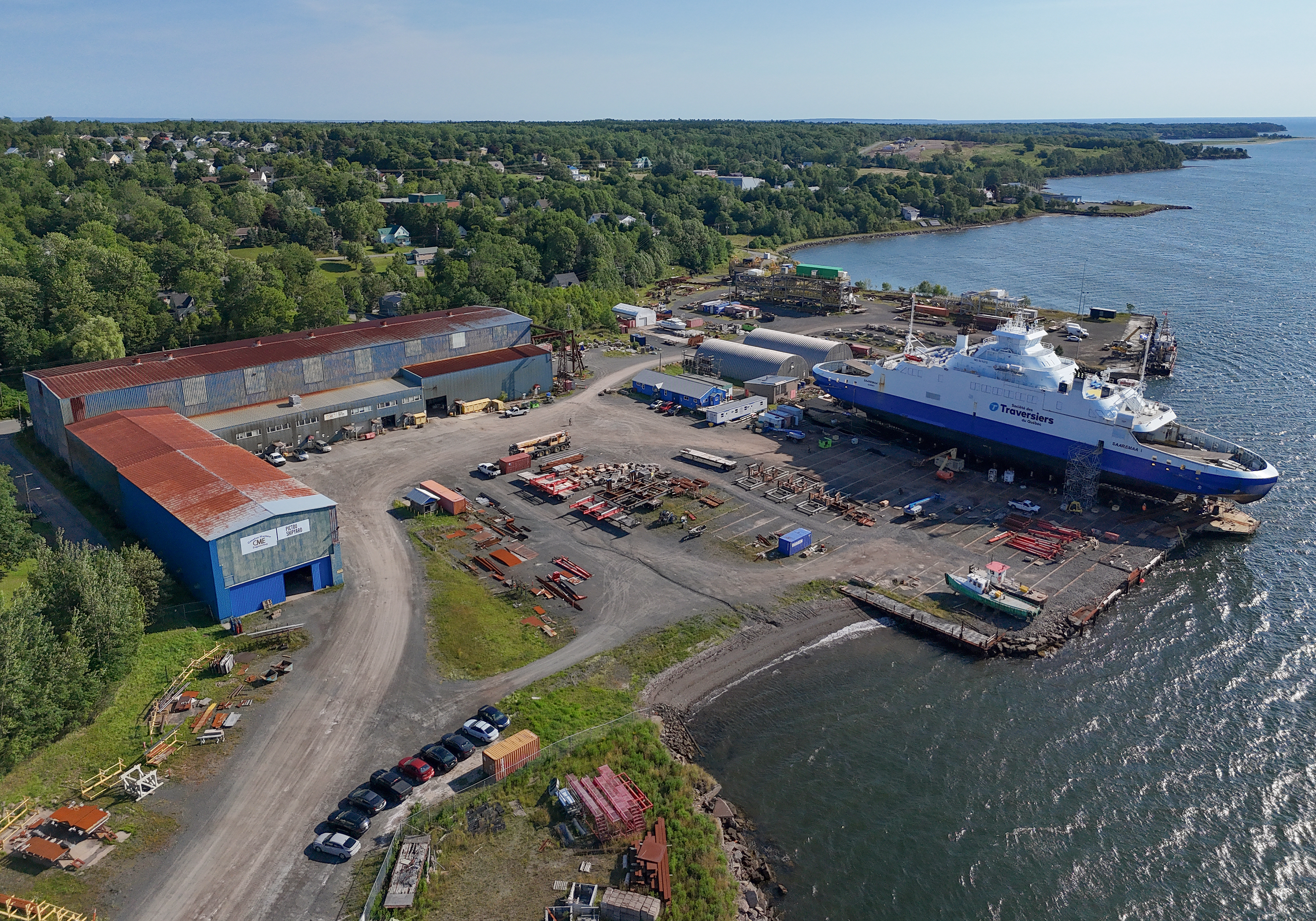
Pictou Shipyard

There are several monuments around the town, including the Hector Settler in Market Square, the No. 2 Construction Battalion monuments on the waterfront, and the cenotaph on Church Street. The war cenotaph was sculpted by George Hill.

Boat tours through Discover the Strait are available, offering various trips to see the harbour and the wildlife in the Northumberland Strait. The waterfront is also home to a marine and cruise ship docks.

Pictou is five kilometres south of the port of Caribou where Northumberland Ferries Limited operates a seasonal vehicle-pedestrian ferry service to Prince Edward Island; there is also a pedestrian-only ferry that operates seasonally to Pictou Island. Several beaches are located near Pictou, most notably Caribou Provincial Park and Waterside Beach Provincial Park. The Jitney Trail also starts at the waterfront. The former train route has been converted into a paved and gravel walkway for pedestrians and runs from Pictou to Oxford. The trail also connects to Brown's Point, a few kilometres outside of the town, where the Hector landed.

== Transportation ==
Pictou County Transit, a public bus system, links the town with nearby Trenton, New Glasgow, Stellarton, and Westville.

== Notable people ==
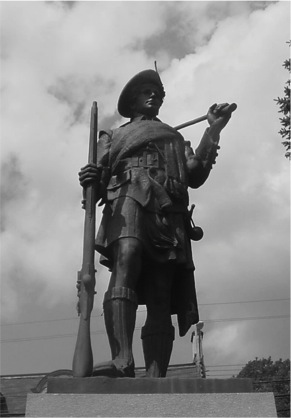
Hector Pioneer by sculptor John Wilson, in Pictou

- Peter Crerar, civil engineer, came to Pictou from Scotland in 1817. Designed and built the Albion Mines Railway, the first standard gauge railroad in North America.
- John William Dawson, geologist and administrator of McGill University (1820–1899)
- Henry Hatton, merchant, shipbuilder, and political figure
- George Hill, flying ace of the Royal Canadian Air Force during World War II
- Georges Langford, singer-songwriter and composer
- William Lowden, the first shipbuilder in Pictou
- Carmen MacDonald, an ice hockey goaltender for the St. Lawrence Saints, a university team from New York State. She won a gold medal as part of Canada's National Women's Under-18 Team at the 2010 IIHF World Women's Under-18 Championship in Chicago.
- Christie MacDonald, American stage actress and singer (1875–1962)
- Joey MacDonald, a former NHL goaltender
- James Drummond MacGregor, first published abolitionist in Canada
- Arthur Stanley Mackenzie, president of Dalhousie University

== Vessels ==
Three naval vessels have been named for Pictou, two Royal Navy schooners during the War of 1812 (see: HMS Pictou), and HMCS Pictou, a Flower-class corvette that served in the Atlantic during World War II.

== See also ==
- List of municipalities in Nova Scotia
- Sutherland Harris Memorial Hospital
