= No. 111 Squadron RAF =

Defunct flying squadron of the Royal Air Force

- No. 111 Squadron badge
- Active: 1 August 1917 – 1 April 1918 (RFC); 1 April 1918 – 1 February 1920 (RAF); 1 October 1923 – 12 May 1947; 2 December 1953 – 30 September 1974; 1 October 1974 – 22 March 2011
- Country: United Kingdom
- Branch: Royal Air Force
- Nicknames: 'Treble One' 'Tremblers'
- Mottos: Latin: Adstantes ("Standing by")
- Battle honours: Palestine 1917–1918*, Megiddo, Home Defence 1940–1942*, France and Low Countries 1940, Dunkirk*, Battle of Britain 1940*, Fortress Europe 1941–1942*, Dieppe, North Africa 1942–1943*, Sicily 1943, Italy 1943–1945*, Salerno, Anzio and Nettuno, Gustav Line, France and Germany 1944*. Honours marked with an asterisk are those emblazoned on the Squadron Standard

Insignia
- Squadron Badge: In front of two swords in saltire a cross potent quadrat charged with three seaxes fesswise in pale
- Squadron Roundel
- Squadron Codes: TM (Apr 1939 – Sep 1939); JU (Sep 1939 – May 1947); B (Carried on Phantoms); H (Carried on Tornados)

Number 111 (Fighter) Squadron, also known as No. CXI (F) Squadron and nicknamed Treble One, was a squadron of the Royal Air Force. It was formed in 1917 in the Middle East as No. 111 Squadron of the Royal Flying Corps during the reorganisation of the Egyptian Expeditionary Force after General Edmund Allenby took command during the Sinai and Palestine Campaign. The squadron remained in the Middle East after the end of the First World War until 1920 when it was renumbered as No. 14 Squadron.

The squadron was reformed in 1923. In World War II in 1940, it fought in the Battle of Britain. In late 1941 it moved to the Mediterranean, where it was involved in the North African Campaign and then the Allied invasion of Sicily and the Allied invasion of Italy. Disbanded in the years after the war, the squadron reformed in 1953 with jets.

Operating the Hawker Hunter, No. 111 Squadron provided an aerobatic display team – the Black Arrows. It also performed aerobatics when it re-equipped with the Lightning interceptor. The Squadron moved to Scotland in 1975, shortly after changing to flying Phantoms. In 1990 the squadron began flying the air defence variant of the Panavia Tornado. It operated the Panavia Tornado F3 in air defence from RAF Leuchars, Scotland until March 2011, when the squadron was disbanded, ending Tornado F3 service in the RAF.

== History ==
=== First World War ===
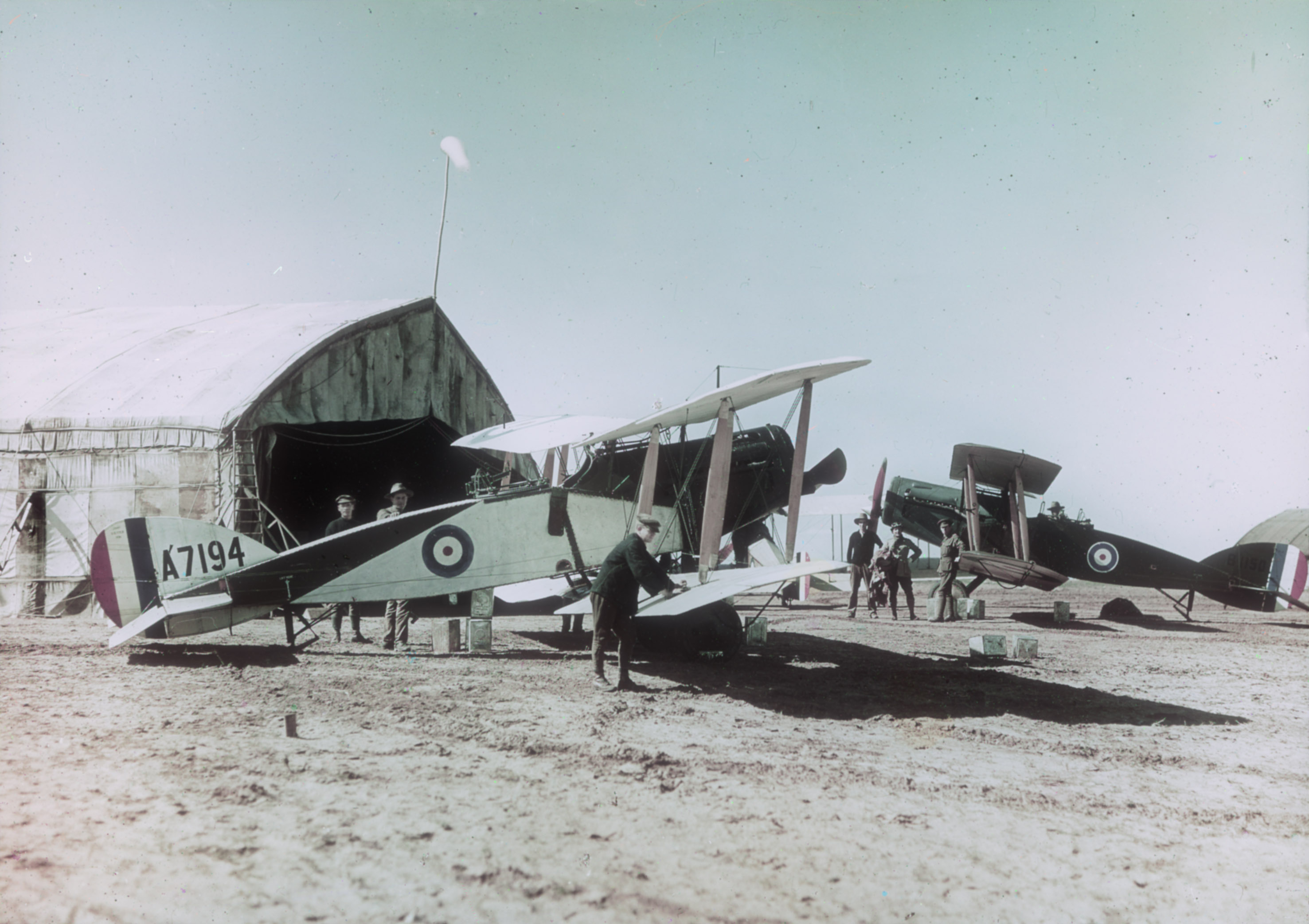
1st Australian Flying Corps Bristol F.2 Fighters in Palestine, 1918.

No. 111 Squadron of the Royal Flying Corps was formed at Deir el-Balah, Palestine, on 1 August 1917, under the command of Major Shekleton, with a mixed bag of single seat fighters as the first dedicated fighter squadron in the region. Its mission was to restrict enemy reconnaissance flights and challenge the German fighter presence over Suez. It was reinforced by Bristol F.2 Fighters in September, one of these claiming the first aerial victory for No. 111 Squadron on 8 October. The squadron began to receive the Royal Aircraft Factory S.E.5a in October 1917. The same month also saw a change of command with Major Shekleton was replaced by Major Strent, after Shekleton became Commander of the 40th (Army) Wing. By December, No. 111 Squadron was based at Julis.

The squadron handed over its Bristol Fighters to No. 1 Squadron, Australian Flying Corps in February 1918, becoming completely equipped with single seat fighters. In Spring 1918, while based at Ramleh, Major Strent was replaced in command by Major Hereward de Havilland, younger brother of aircraft designer Geoffrey de Havilland. In September 1918, Treble One participated in the Battle of Megiddo, tasked with attacking the German airfield at Jenin. By the time the Armistice with Turkey ended the war in the Middle East in October, No. 111 Squadron had claimed 44 enemy aircraft destroyed and a further 13 forced down for the loss of two pilots killed in combat, one prisoner and three wounded. The squadron had produced four aces: Austin Lloyd Fleming, future Air Marshal Peter Roy Maxwell Drummond, Charles Davidson, and Arthur Peck.

=== Inter-War ===
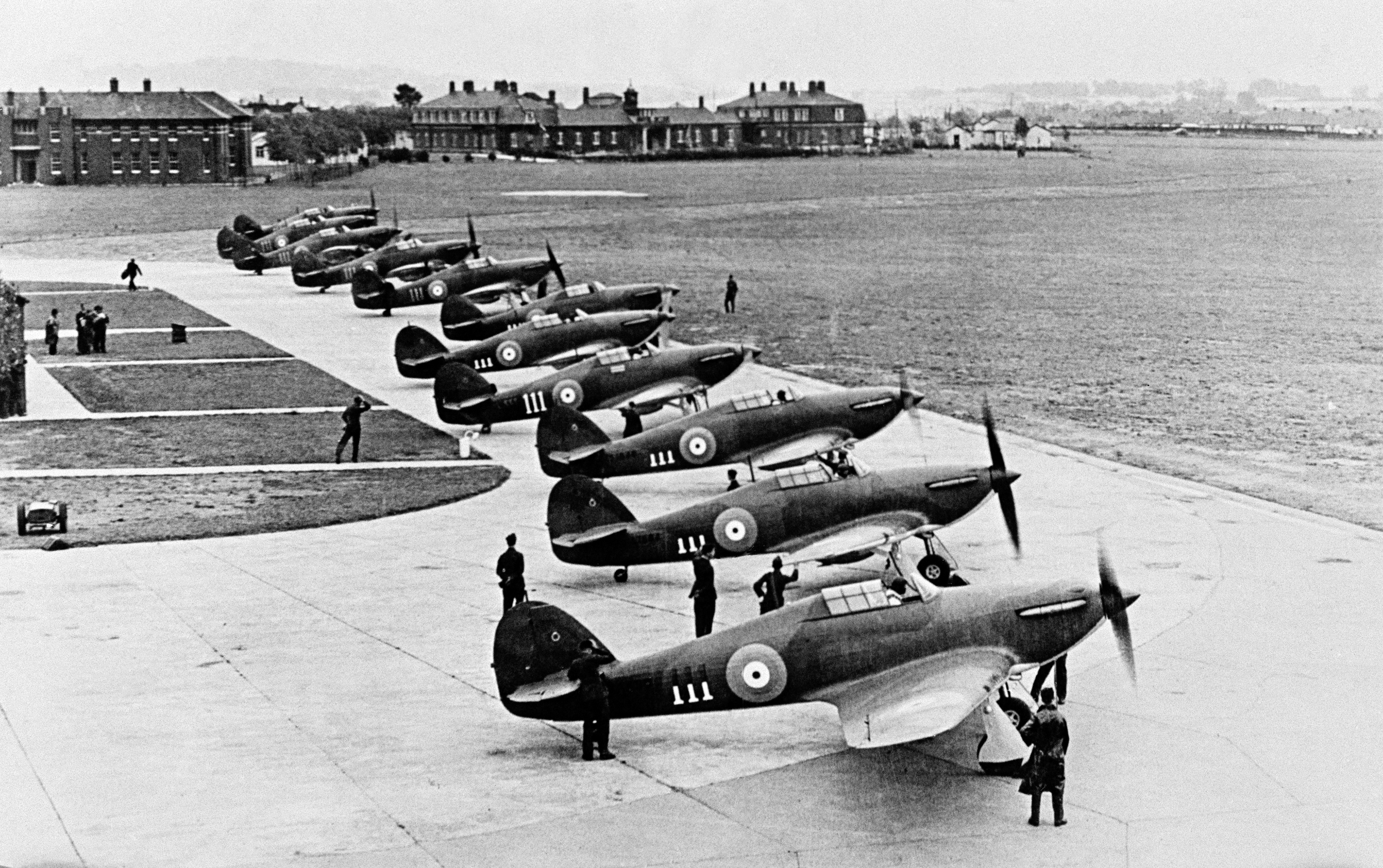
Hawker Hurricane Mk.Is of No. 111 Squadron at RAF Northolt, 1938.

Treble One moved to Egypt after the War ended and then to Ramla in Palestine on 6 February 1919, re-equipping with the Bristol Fighter. On 1 February 1920, the squadron renumbered to No. 14 Squadron. On 1 October 1923, No. 111 Squadron reformed at RAF Duxford, equipped with a single flight of six Gloster Grebe fighters, the first Grebes to enter service with the RAF. These were supplemented by a second flight of First World War-vintage Sopwith Snipes in April 1924, and by a third flight of Armstrong Whitworth Siskins in June 1924, completely equipping itself with Siskins in January 1925. The squadron, tasked with defending London, replaced its Siskins with Bristol Bulldogs in January–February 1931, with its Siskins being passed on to No. 19 Squadron. The squadron moved to RAF Northolt in July 1934 and re-equipped with Gloster Gauntlets in May–June 1936. The squadron became the first Hawker Hurricane squadron in January 1938.

=== Second World War ===
==== 1939–1940 ====
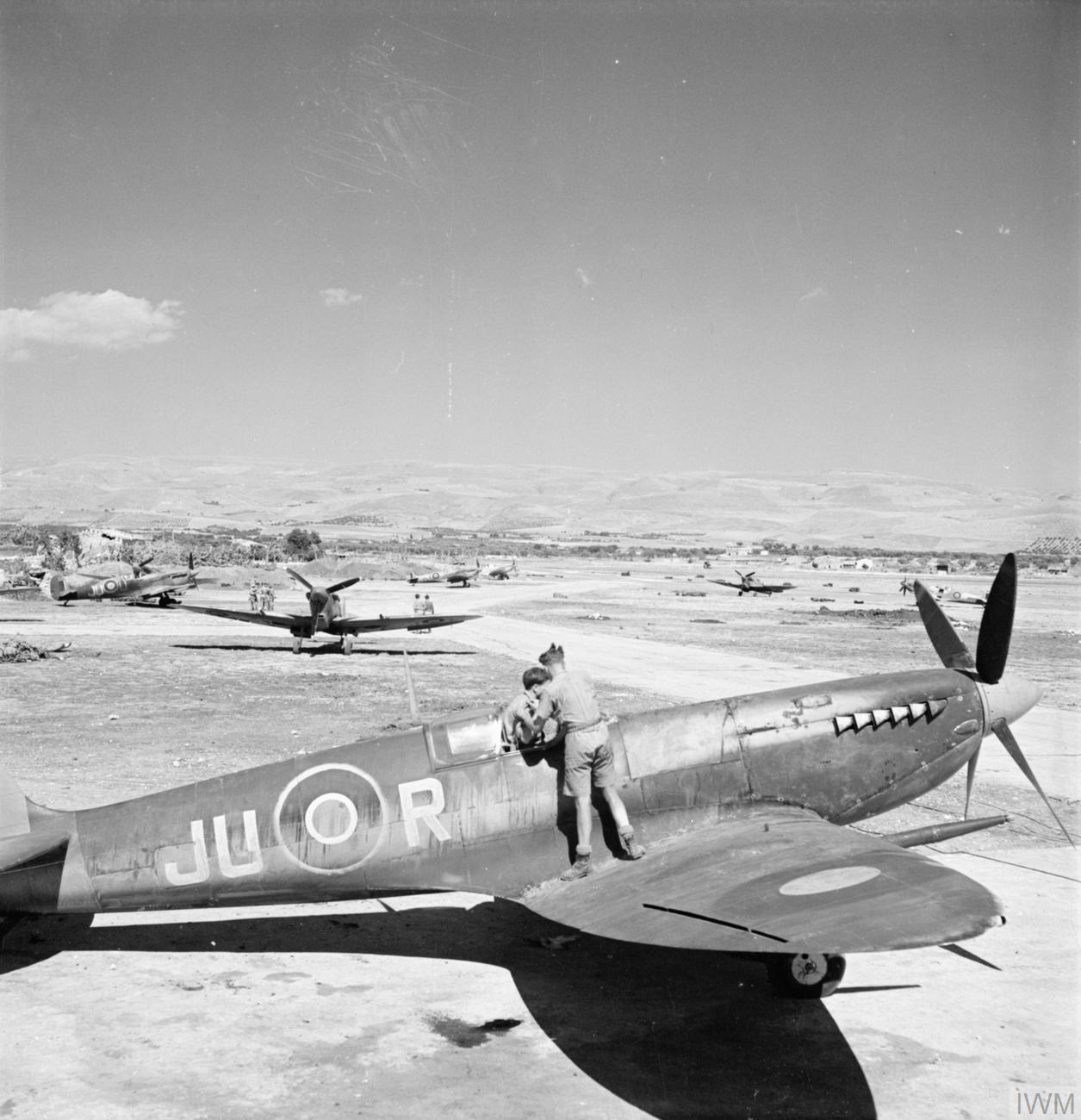
Supermarine Spitfires of No. 111 Squadron undergoing maintenance at Comiso, Sicily. 'JU-R' in the foreground is an early variant of the Mk.IXc, the other aircraft being Mk.Vcs.

Still based at RAF Northolt at the outbreak of war, No. 111 (Fighter) Squadron relocated to RAF Acklington, Northumberland, in October 1939. The squadron scored its first victory on 29 November, when Sqn. Ldr. Broadhurst shot down a Heinkel He 111. Treble One moved even further north to RAF Drem, East Lothian, in December 1939 in order to provide cover for the Royal Navy at Scapa Flow. By May 1940, No. 111 (F) Squadron had returned south to RAF Northolt due to the German invasion of France. On 16 May, a flight from No. 111 (F) Squadron joined a flight from No. 253 Squadron to form a joint unit, with one half deploying to France and the other remaining in Britain. Treble One flew defensive flights during the Dunkirk evacuation.

No. 111 (Fighter) Squadron played a role in the Battle of Britain while based at RAF Croydon, pioneering dangerous head-on attacks against the Luftwaffe bomber streams. However, after suffering heavy losses in August 1940, the unit was rotated north in September to RAF Drem. Claims included 47 aircraft shot down for 18 Hurricanes lost.

==== 1941–1945 ====
The squadron replaced its Hurricanes with Supermarine Spitfires in April 1941. In November, Treble One again relocated to RAF Gibraltar for support of Operation Torch, the invasion of North Africa. Under the command of Squadron Leader George Hill it moved to Malta in June 1943 to support Operation Husky, the invasion of Sicily. No. 111 (F) Squadron moved through Italy with the advancing Allied ground forces and remained there until the end of the war, after which it moved to Austria. The squadron disbanded on 12 May 1947. 269 aircraft were claimed shot down, making the squadron one of the top RAF scorers for the war.

=== Cold War ===
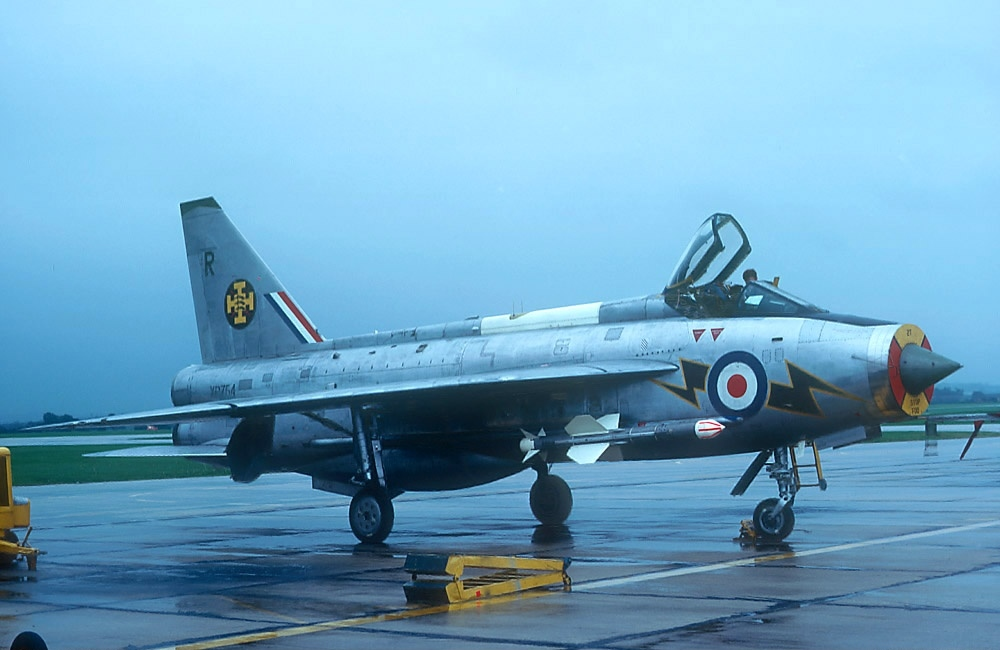
English Electric Lightning F Mk 3 XP754 of 111 Squadron

The squadron was reactivated on 2 December 1953 at RAF North Weald with Squadron Leader Harry Pears in command. Conversion to the Gloster Meteor F.8s began and was completed in 3 months. In 1955 the Meteors were replaced with the Hawker Hunter F4 which in turn were replaced by the Hunter F6 by the end of 1956. On 19 February 1958 Treble One moved to RAF North Luffenham followed in quick succession to RAF Wattisham, Suffolk in June 1958. They achieved international acclaim with their 'Black Arrows' aerobatic display team using the Hawker Hunter, under the command of Squadron Leader Roger Topp.

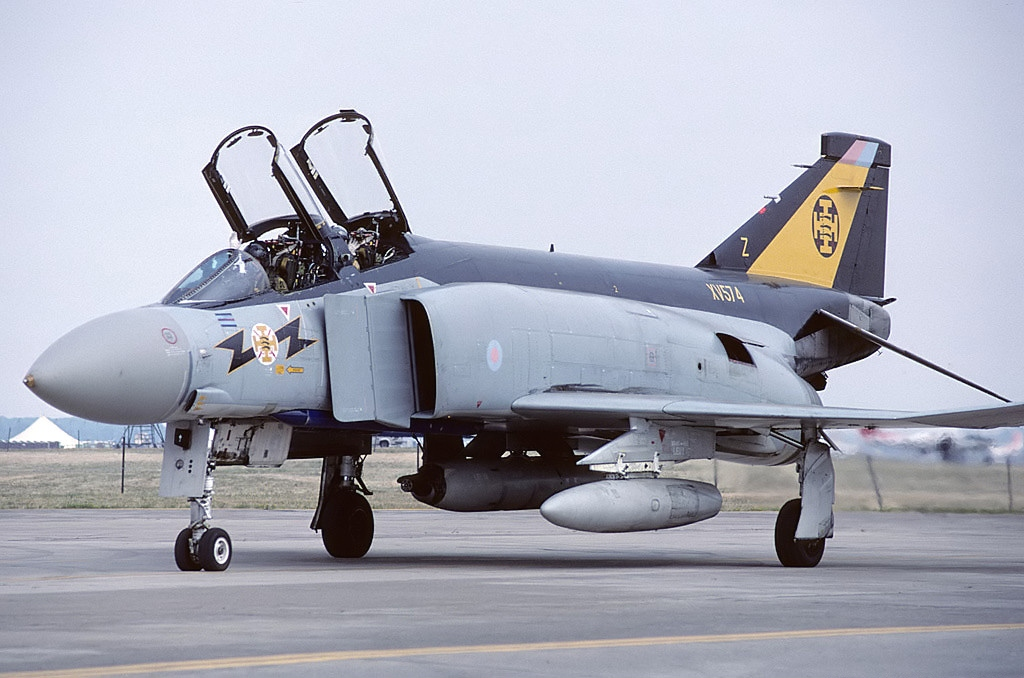
McDonnell Douglas Phantom FG.1 XV574 of 111 Squadron

The squadron received its first two all-weather English Electric Lightning on 13 April 1961. Within two months a further seven had been delivered and by September the squadron was declared fully operational. The initial F1A aircraft were replaced by early 1965 with Lightning F3's. Under Squadron Leader George Black (later AVM) the squadron was chosen to provide a combined display with the Red Arrows for the Paris Air Show in June of that year. During the 2 to 3 months workup of the Diamond Nine formation plus a solo aerobatics Lightning, the squadron fielded 10 aircraft per day, a remarkable achievement for what was a somewhat difficult aircraft to service. In 1974, the squadron moved from RAF Wattisham after almost 18 years and re-equipped with the McDonnell Douglas Phantom FGR.2 at RAF Coningsby, before moving north to RAF Leuchars on 3 November 1975.

=== Tornado F.3 (1990–2011) ===
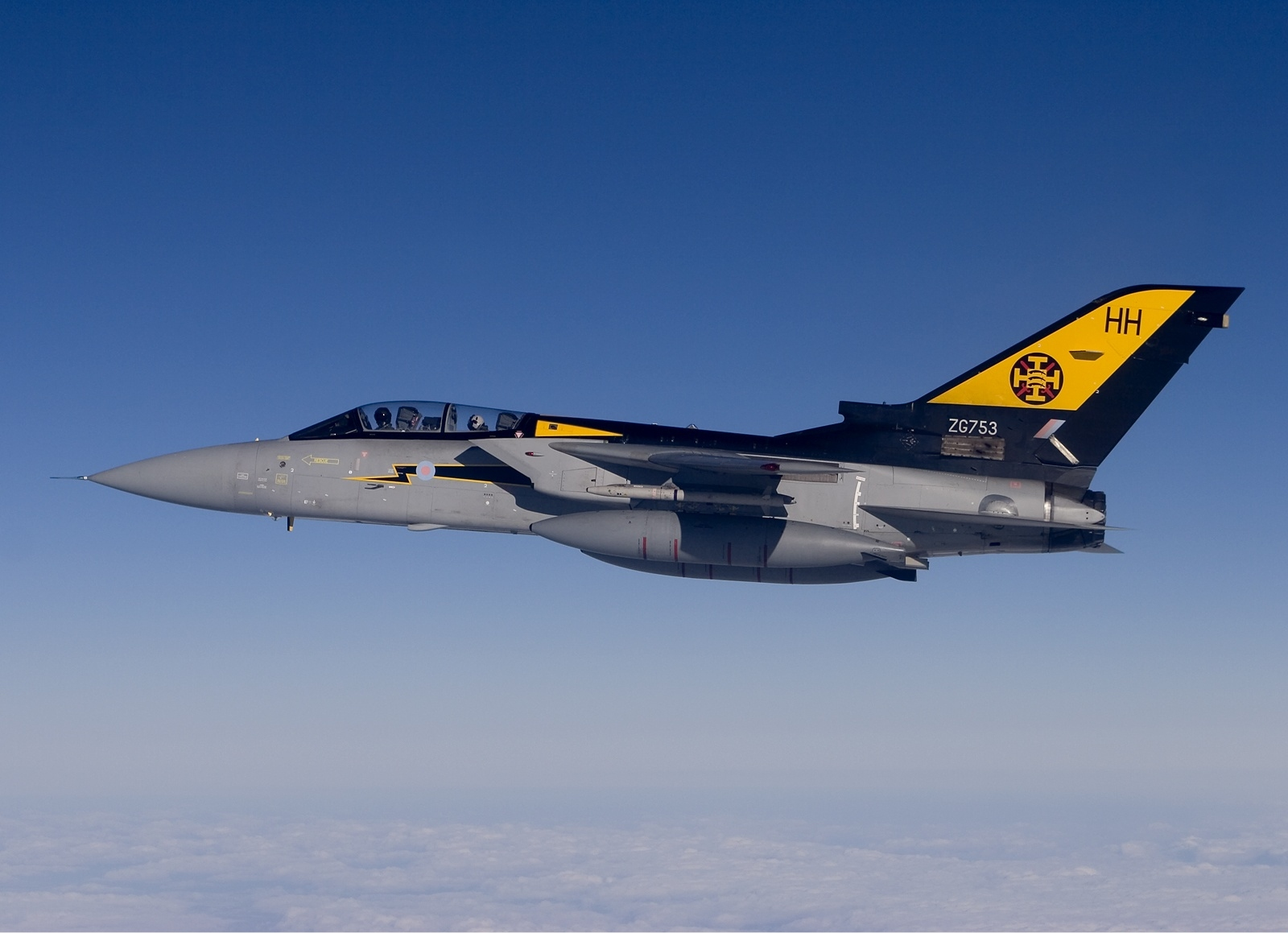
Panavia Tornado F.3 ZG753 of No. 111 (Fighter) Squadron, 2005.

The squadron began to re-equip with the Tornado F.3 in 1990. Throughout its time at Leuchars the No. 111 (F) Squadron was tasked with the maintenance of Quick Reaction Alert, which involves keeping aircraft at a high state of readiness to intercept, identify and, should it be necessary, destroy hostile aircraft approaching UK airspace. The squadron was involved in Operation Deny Flight and Operation Deliberate Force over Bosnia, Operations Bolton and Resinate in the Middle East and regularly participated in major Air Defence exercises, both in the UK and abroad.

Led by Wing Commander Rob Birch, No. 111 (Fighter) Squadron was involved in Operation Telic where it formed the major part of the Tornado F3 Wing at Prince Sultan Air Base in Saudi Arabia.

Following the disbandment of No. 43 Squadron in July 2009, Treble One was the sole RAF Tornado F3 unit. The squadron disbanded at RAF Leuchars on 22 March 2011.

== Aircraft operated ==
Aircraft operated include:

- Bristol Scout (Aug 1917–Oct 1917)
- Royal Aircraft Factory B.E.2e (Aug 1917–Oct 1917)
- Bristol M.1e (Aug 1917–Jan 1918)
- de Havilland DH.2 (Aug 1917–Dec 1917)
- Vickers F.B.19 (Aug 1917–Jan 1918)
- Bristol F.2B Fighter (Sep 1917–Feb 1918)
- Royal Aircraft Factory S.E.5a (Oct 1917–Feb 1919)
- Nieuport 17 (Jan 1918–July 1918)
- Nieuport 23 (Jan 1918–July 1918)
- Nieuport 24 (Jan 1918–July 1918)
- Bristol F.2B Fighter (Feb 1919–Feb 1920)
- Gloster Grebe Mk.II (Oct 1923–Jan 1925)
- Sopwith Snipe (Apr 1924–Jan 1925)
- Armstrong Whitworth Siskin Mk.III (June 1924–Nov 1926)
- Armstrong Whitworth Siskin Mk.IIIa (Sep 1926–Feb 1931)
- Bristol Bulldog Mk.IIa (Jan 1931–June 1936)
- Gloster Gauntlet Mk.II (May 1936–Feb 1938)
- Hawker Hurricane Mk.I (Jan 1938–Apr 1941)
- Hawker Hurricane Mk.IIa (Mar 1941–May 1941)
- Supermarine Spitfire Mk.I (Apr 1941– May 1941)
- Supermarine Spitfire Mk.IIa (May 1941– Sep 1941)
- Supermarine Spitfire Mk.Vb (Aug 1941 – Oct 1941)
- Supermarine Spitfire Mk.IXe (June 1943 – May 1947)
- Gloster Meteor F.8 (Dec 1953–June 1955)
- Hawker Hunter F.4 (June 1955–Nov 1956)
- Hawker Hunter F.6 (Nov 1956–Apr 1961)
- English Electric Lightning F Mk 1A (Apr 1961–Dec 1964)
- English Electric Lightning F Mk 3 (Dec 1964–Sep 1974)
- English Electric Lightning F Mk 6 (Aug 1973–Sep 1974)
- McDonnell Douglas Phantom FGR.2 (Oct 1974–July 1979)
- McDonnell Douglas Phantom FG.1 (Jan 1978–Jan 1990)
- Panavia Tornado F.3 (June 1990–Mar 2011)

== See also ==
- List of Royal Air Force aircraft squadrons
