= Peter Crerar =

Scottish-Canadian civil engineer

Peter Crerar (1785 in Breadalbane, Scotland – 5 November 1856 in Pictou, Nova Scotia) was a Scottish-Nova Scotian civil engineer. He designed the first railway in British North America, and the first standard gauge railroad in North America, at Stellarton, near Pictou, Nova Scotia.

== The 1836 Albion Mines Railway ==
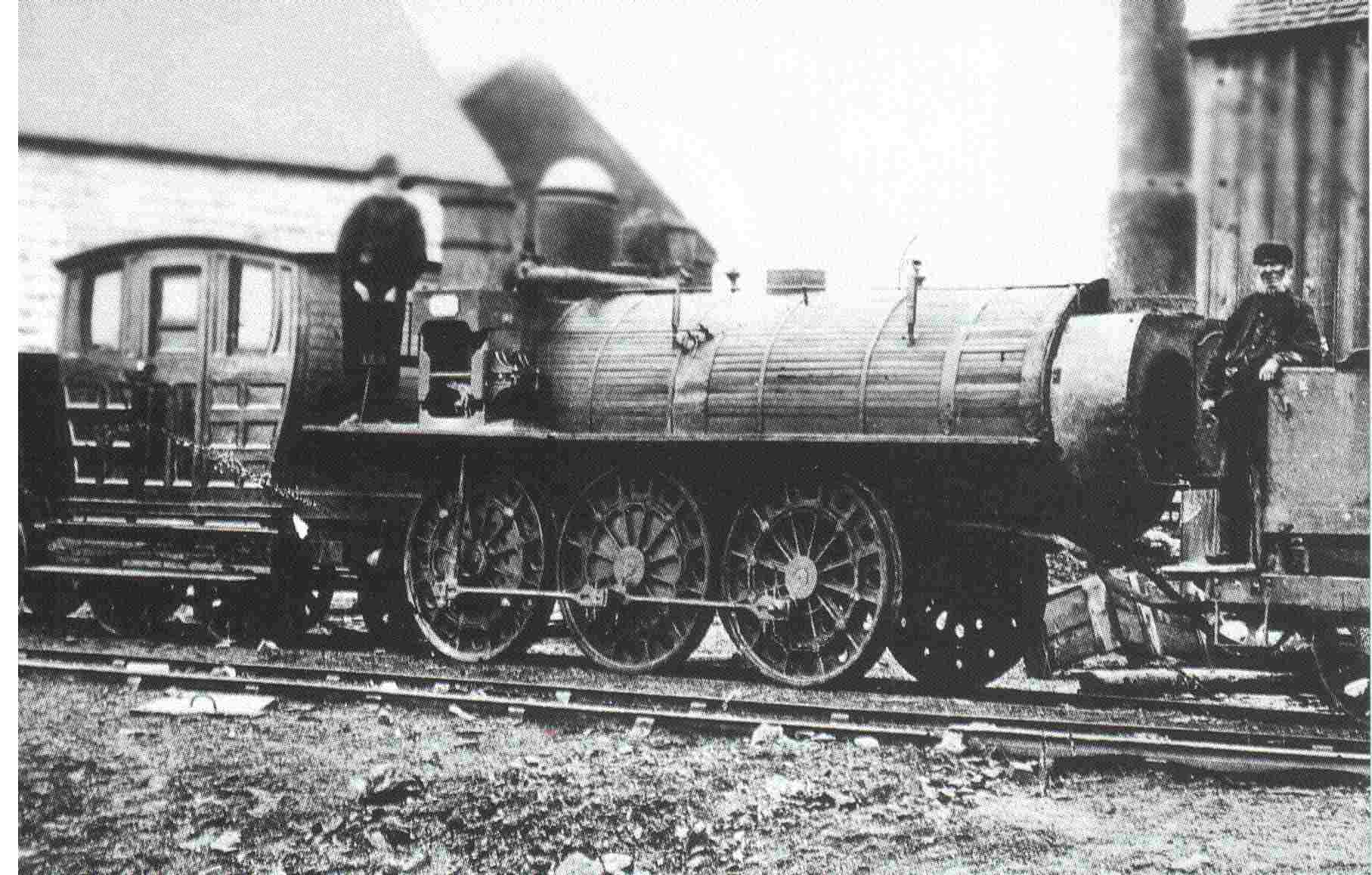
The Samson locomotive on the Albion Mines Railway

Crerar had shown an early interest in railways as early as 3 February 1836 when he wrote a lengthy letter concerning a proposed railway between Halifax and Windsor. Later in 1836 the General Mining Association of London, England, owners of the Albion Mines, now Stellarton, decided to build a railway from the Albion Mines to its loading grounds on the East River. At that time there were few construction engineers in the area. Peter Crerar, a government land surveyor, was given the task. The plans were sent to the head office of the Mining Association in London, with the request that an engineer be sent out to execute them. When the plans were submitted to George Stephenson, builder of the locomotive who had engineered the construction of the Stockton and Darlington, England's first railroad, he reported to the Mining Association that, in his opinion, the person who prepared the drawings was capable of executing them. The railway was then built under the supervision of Peter Crerar.

Seven original maps and charts drawn by Crerar for the project between August 1837 and December 1838 were unearthed in a building being vacated by the Department of Mines in Stellarton. They are now preserved in the Nova Scotia Museum of Industry.

The building of the Albion Mines Railway began in 1836 and the road was opened for traffic in 1839. The line, 6 miles (10 km) in length, was so nearly straight that the minimum curve radius was 300 feet (91 m). The estimated quantity of excavations was 400,000 cubic yards. At the water terminus there was a wharf 1,500 feet (460 m) long by 24 feet (7 m) wide, commanding a fall of 17 feet (5 m) above high water level at the shoots. The masonry, bridges, culverts, etc., were of cut freestone, from a nearby quarry. The total cost of construction was $160,000.

While the railroad was being constructed, three locomotives were being built in England by Timothy Hackworth. They were landed at Pictou in May 1839 and brought up the East River in lighters, towed by a Mining Company steamship. The locomotives were Samson, Hercules, and John Buddle. The three locomotives were accompanied by John Stubbs, Hackworth's shop foreman, who directed their assembly before returning to England. Two locomotive engineers also came with the engines, George Greathead (whose name does not appear in the Nova Scotia record) and George Davidson. Davidson served as Samson's driver throughout the engine's working life and accompanied the locomotive to railway exhibits in Chicago in 1883 and 1893.

As George Patterson reports, the ceremonial opening in 1839 was celebrated province-wide:

The opening of the railroad was made the occasion of general rejoicing. The two steamers, Pocahontas and Albion, with lighters attached, each carried from Pictou about 1,000 persons to New Glasgow, whence they were taken by train to the mines. Crowds of people on horseback and on foot were there assembled from all parts of the country. Here a procession was formed of the various trades, the Masonic lodges, the Pictou Volunteer Artillery Company, as visitors mounted, with bands of music and pipers at intervals, and various banners, marched to New Glasgow and back again, when the Artillery Company fired a salute. A train of waggons, fitted up to receive passengers, had been attached to each engine, and, being filled with the crowd, now made the first trip to New Glasgow and back again, giving a new sensation to multitudes. On their return, a feast was given to the employees of the Company, for which 1,100 lb (500 kg). of beef and mutton, with corresponding quantities of other articles, were provided; a dinner was given to invited guests, and the night was spent in general festivity...

Herb MacDonald similarly recounts the celebrations:

With parades, rides on trains powered by Hercules and Buddle, a feast centred by "1100 lb of beef and mutton," music and dances, the day was summarized by an oft-repeated statement in the Merchant & Farmer that "there was not an unemployed fiddle or bagpipe from Cape John to the Garden of Eden," — the extremities of the district. The paper noted that the only misadventure of the day involved a dog being run down by one of the locomotives, and had the good taste not to draw comparisons with opening day on the Liverpool and Manchester.

The Pictou Observer [24 September 1839] reported:

The occasion was no less important an event than the opening of a Railroad for locomotive engines from the Mines to the wharves of the Company below New Glasgow bridge — an event which may truly be called a new era, not only in the history of the Association, but also of the province... It has been conducted under the immediate supervision of Mr. Peter Crerar, whose practical skill as a Civil Engineer is too well known to require mention.

Today the Albion Mines Railway is commemorated by the "Samson Trail" following the route of the old railway from the Nova Scotia Museum of Industry along the East River towards Abercrombie. The railway's locomotive Samson is preserved at the museum and is the oldest surviving locomotive in Canada.

== Other engineering projects ==
Crerar's earliest recorded work was the drawing up plans for St. James' Anglican Church, Pictou in 1824. The main figure behind this church's construction was Henry Hatton, later to be Crerar's son's father-in-law.

Throughout his life he served as a surveyor on roads and projects in the Pictou area, including the road between Mount Thom and Pictou, the Fisher's Grant Road, the French River, Huggins, and Sutherland Bridges, the pier at Arisaig, the Wallace Bridge, and the road from West Chester to Amherst.

In 1845 he was a member of a local committee in Pictou County formed to support the proposed Halifax and Quebec Railway project. In 1851, as part of the first phase of planning for the Nova Scotia Railway, he carried out surveys for a proposed route north from Truro to Pictou. When built, the "Pictou Branch" followed another route selected by Sandford Fleming.

Crerar served as Deputy Registrar General of Pictou County. He was later made Commissioner for Improvements to the Pictou section of the Main Post Road of Pictou.

== Emigration to Nova Scotia ==
His only known residence in Scotland was the farm of Cuiltrannich, in Lawers, Kenmore Parish, on the north shore of Loch Tay. His family departed for Nova Scotia in July 1817, probably aboard the Brig Hope, which sailed from Greenock to Pictou in 1817. He first gained employment as a schoolteacher.

== Family ==
His wife was Anne Clarke (born circa 1791 Nessintully, Laggan, Inverness-shire - died 15 April 1865 Pictou, Nova Scotia), daughter of Ewan Clarke. Peter and Anne had eight children: John Crerar (born 18 August 1815, Cuiltrannich, Lawers, Kenmore - died 26 December 1889 Glenalmond, Pictou); May Crerar (born on a passage to North America upon the Banks of Newfoundland, 19 July 1817; died Fishers Grant, Nova Scotia, 8 June 1818); Captain Ewan Clarke Crerar (born 18 July 1819, Fisher's Grant - drowned 19 January 1857, on wreck of the Lord Ashburton at Grand Manan Island); Capt. William Grant Crerar (born 12 August 1821 Pictou - died 2 April 1898 Glenalmond, Pictou); Dr. James Peter Crerar (born 15 September 1823 Pictou - died 23 April 1885, Royal Military Asylum, Chelsea, England); Capt. Daniel Crerar (born 19 January 1826 Pictou – died circa 18 January 1859 Shanghai, China); Capt. Peter Crerar (born 10 July 1828 Pictou - died 4 May 1868 Cardiff, Wales); Capt. David Stewart Crerar (born 13 August 1830 Pictou - died 2 June 1893 Pictou).

== Death ==
His Pictou obituary reads as follows:

Died... At Pictou, on Wednesday, 5th inst., Peter Crerar, Esq., a native of Breadalbane, Perthshire, Scotland, First Deputy Surveyor and Registrar of Deeds for the County of Pictou, aged 71. But few men have passed from our midst whose loss will be more generally or so extensively regretted. He has left a widow and seven sons to mourn their loss. His catholic spirit, his clear judgment, and his honest disposition, made him one of the most respected members of the community, as was evinced by one of the largest funeral processions ever witnessed at that place. He was connected with the Church of Scotland from his youth, and clung to her standards through all her trials and difficulties, and was Chairman of St. Andrew's Church [Pictou] for many years previous to his death, in which capacity he made entire satisfaction. Among his last expressions were these words, "I have unwavering confidence in Christ Jesus my Saviour."

He is buried in the Laurel Hill Cemetery, Pictou.
