= Twenty-Six (novel) =

2003 novel by Leo McKay and Jr.

- First Edition Cover
- Author: Leo McKay, Jr.
- Language: English
- Genre: Fiction
- Publisher: McClelland & Stewart
- Publication date: April 15, 2003
- Publication place: Canada
- Media type: Print (Hardcover & Paperback)
- Pages: 388 pp
- ISBN: 0-7710-5475-0
- OCLC: 51086459
- Dewey Decimal: 813/.54 22
- LC Class: PR9199.3.M42433 T88 2003
- Preceded by: Like This

Twenty-Six is the debut novel by author Leo McKay, Jr., released in 2003. The book was a national bestseller in Canada and won the 2004 Dartmouth Book Award for Fiction.

== Plot summary ==
Set in the fictional town of Albion Mines, Nova Scotia, the novel takes place against the backdrop of a coal mine explosion that kills twenty-six miners, loosely based on the real-life Westray Mine explosion of 1992. Like the real-life incident, the novel's Eastyard mine disaster has themes of government corruption and the greed of the mine operator.

The story primarily revolves around the family of Ennis Burrows, a former union organizer, and his sons, Ziv - a college drop-out now working at the local Zellers - and Arvel, a miner who has followed in his father's footsteps. Their stories and those of other supporting characters unfold from the novel's beginning with the mine explosion, and working backward to show how the tragedy has fundamentally changed each of their lives.

== Reception ==
The novel received widespread acclaim from Canadian critics, and reached number 6 on MacLean's Magazine's best-sellers list less than a week after it was released. Canadian author Robert J. Wiersema wrote in the Montreal Gazette that it was one of the year's best novels - and stated that "...if you are able to read just a single piece of Canadian fiction this spring, it should be Twenty-Six". It was also awarded the 2004 Dartmouth book award for Fiction.

== See also ==
- Westray Mine

== Trivia ==
- Albion Mines was the former name of the town of Stellarton, prior to its official incorporation in 1889.
- While the book was entirely a work of fiction, there was one real life character who made an appearance. Danny Dykens was the local odd-jobs-man who came to clear the debris from the house of the protagonists. Dykens was a real resident of Stellarton's Red Row neighbourhood, and his real occupation was garbage removal. Dykens died in 2011, and in front of his coffin at his wake was proudly displayed a copy of the book, opened to the page where he was mentioned.
