= Westray Mine =

Coal mine in Nova Scotia, Canada

Westray Coal Mine
- Location in Nova Scotia
- Location: Pictou County, Nova Scotia, Canada; 45°33′14″N 062°38′44″W
- Products: Coal
- Opened: 1991
- Closed: 1992
- Company: Curragh Resources

The Westray Mine was a Canadian coal mine in Plymouth, Nova Scotia. Westray was owned and operated by Curragh Resources Incorporated (Curragh Inc.), which obtained both provincial and federal government money to open the mine, and supply the local electric power utility with coal.

The mine opened in September 1991, but closed eight months later when it was the site of an underground methane explosion on May 9, 1992, killing all 26 miners working underground at the time. The week-long attempts to rescue the miners were widely followed by national media until it was obvious there would be no survivors.

About a week later, the Nova Scotia government ordered a public inquiry to look into what caused one of Canada's deadliest mining disasters, and published its findings in late 1997. The report stated that the mine was mismanaged, miners' safety was ignored, and poor oversight by government regulators led to the disaster. A criminal case against two mine managers went to trial in the mid-1990s, but ultimately was dropped by the crown in 1998, as it seemed unlikely that a conviction could be attained. Curragh Resources went bankrupt in 1993, partially due to the disaster.

One hundred and seventeen miners became unemployed almost immediately after the explosion; they were paid 12 weeks' severance six years after the mine's closure, but only when the provincial government was pressured to intervene. The mine was dismantled and permanently sealed in November 1998.

== Background ==
Following the closure of the last working mine in the 1970s, Pictou County's hopes for a mining renaissance were revived with the announcement of a proposed mine in the region in the late 1980s. The timing was perfect, politically, since the region had elected a fledgling leader of the federal opposition, Brian Mulroney, in a 1983 by-election in Central Nova. Following the election of a federal Conservative-led government, Elmer MacKay became a Tory political heavyweight in the riding. Provincially, the area was also home to Conservative premier Donald Cameron. Money was made available to Toronto company Curragh Resources for establishing a mine.

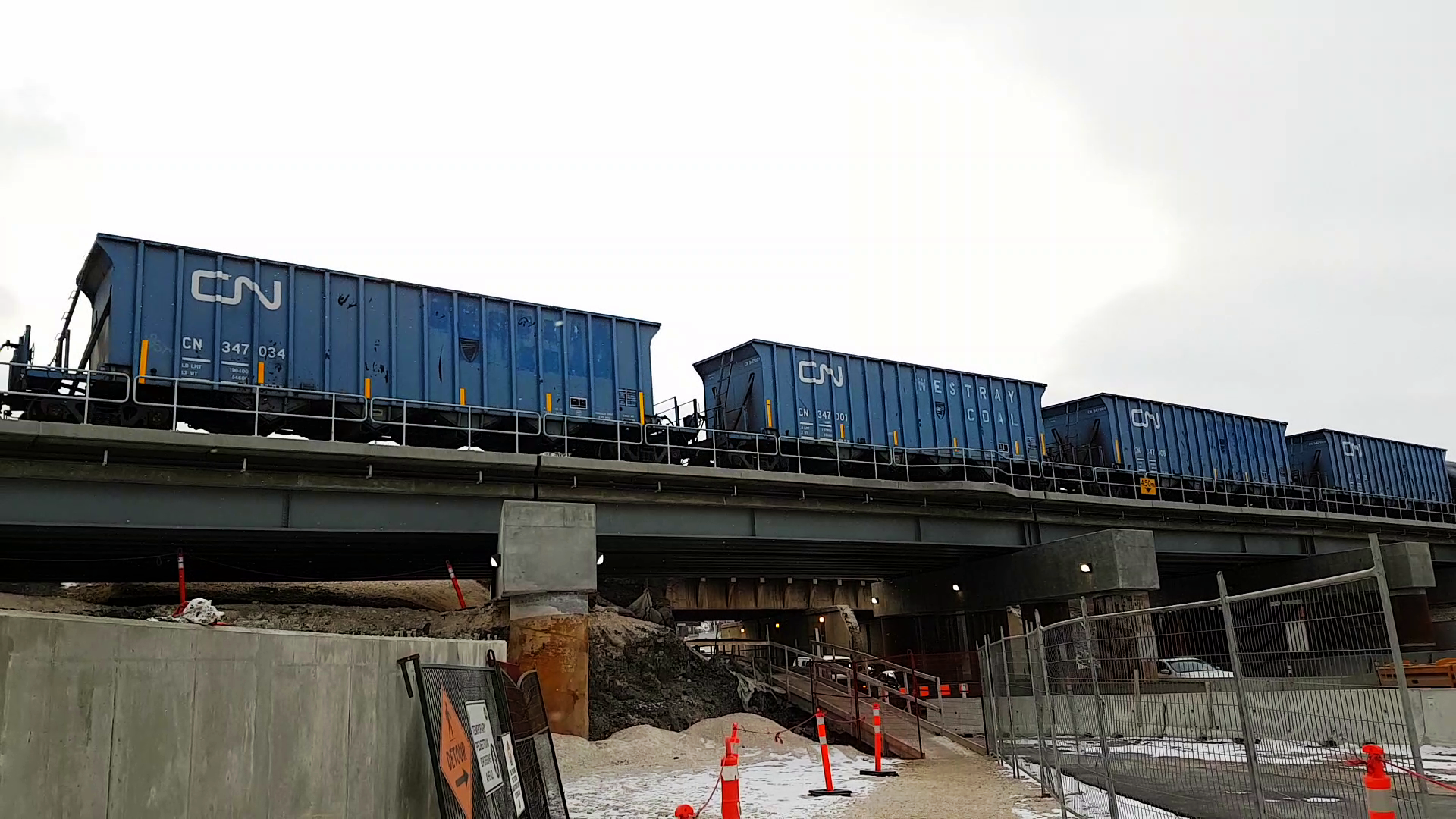
Four CN Westray Coal Hoppers heading west through Winnipeg, MB.

A 0.75 mi (1.21 km) rail spur was built off the CN Rail main line at Stellarton which crossed the East River of Pictou to the mine site in Plymouth. The coal from the mine would be transferred by dedicated unit trains to feed the nearby Trenton Generating Station operated by Nova Scotia Power Company which was a provincial Crown corporation at the time; the actual rail cars would be constructed at the nearby TrentonWorks rail car plant which was struggling for orders. Subsequently, the 37 cars, CN 347000–347036, were built by National Steel Car at Hamilton, Ontario, during November and December 1991.

== Mine opens ==
On September 11, 1991, the mine was opened to great local fanfare, but immediately problems began to surface, when multiple roof collapses occurred within the first few months. Two months prior to the opening, MLA Bernie Boudreau wrote to Nova Scotia labour minister Leroy Legere, asking why the mine was using potentially dangerous mining methods not approved for coal mining. The labour ministry gave Curragh Inc. a special permit to use these methods to tunnel until they reached the coal seam, but not actually mine coal.

Legere was not aware that the company continued to use these methods, three months after the mine opened. Accusations were made by mine workers of company cutbacks in safety training and equipment and of negligent and outright criminal behaviour toward safety inspections. Miners complained about working in deep coal dust. In November 1991, coal miner Carl Guptill made safety complaints to labour ministry inspectors, but they were not investigated, and he was fired in January 1992 for making his claims.

== The disaster ==
On Saturday, May 9, 1992, methane gas and subsequent coal dust explosions at 5:18 a.m. ADT killed 26 miners. It was Canada's worst mining disaster since 1958, when a bump at another Nova Scotia coal mine in Springhill claimed the lives of 75 miners.

In the wake of the explosion, Canadian and international media coverage descended upon the tiny hamlet of Plymouth and the nearby towns of New Glasgow, Stellarton, Westville and Trenton. Coverage gripped Canadians for several days as teams of drägerman searched the debris-strewn depths of the mine for survivors.

Over the next several days, media reported non-stop from a community centre located across the road from the mine, while rescue teams encountered extremely hazardous conditions underground. Westray officials did not cooperate well with the media, which affected the release of information.

The bodies of 15 miners were discovered and, afterward, the search and rescue was changed to a search and recovery operation. After underground conditions worsened, the decision was made to abandon recovery efforts, entombing the bodies of 11 miners in the depths of the mine.

The 117 miners who were not working on shift at the time had to wait almost six years before they were given 12 weeks' severance pay, plus accumulated interest. The miners were only paid after years of legal battles, when the Nova Scotia government ordered the severance to be paid in 1998.

=== Cause of death ===
The 15 miners whose bodies were recovered all died within one minute of the explosion's ignition, according to autopsies and external medical examinations. The majority of the bodies were found to have very high concentrations of carbon monoxide; this would cause death in 20 seconds to one minute. At least three bodies showed injuries consistent with blunt force trauma, causing several injuries, each of which would have been fatal. All of the recovered bodies showed signs of burning, ranging from superficial charring to fourth degree burns. Of the recovered miners, 13 were identified visually.

According to dragermen, one body was located but could not be removed from the mine. This was due to the body being crushed and trapped within machinery which had been compacted by the explosion. The remaining 10 miners, whose bodies were never located, were believed to have been killed instantly. Their working areas suffered the most comprehensive destruction in the mine, with many large rockfalls. It is considered unlikely that any of these miners survived the explosion.

=== Trial ===
The Royal Canadian Mounted Police (RCMP) started their probe into the explosion, around the time the search and rescue was called off in May. On September 17, RCMP investigators re-entered the mine with a draeger team to gather evidence for criminal prosecution, and managed to enter the "southwest main" shaft where the remaining miners' bodies were located and the explosion's suspected epicentre.

On October 5, 1992, Westray Coal and four of its managers were charged with 52 non-criminal counts of operating an unsafe mine under the Nova Scotia Occupational Health and Safety Act by the Nova Scotia Department of Labour. That December 34 charges were withdrawn by John Pearson, the province's director of public prosecutions. On March 4, 1993, the remaining non-criminal charges were withdrawn by Pearson, who expressed concern that they might jeopardize future criminal charges. At the time, no criminal charges were laid by the RCMP.

Two of the mine's managers, Gerald Phillips and Roger Parry, were charged with 26 counts of manslaughter and criminal negligence causing death. Throughout the trial, the Crown was reluctant to provide full disclosure in accordance with the Criminal Code. It was necessary for the trial judge, Mr. Justice Robert Anderson, to specifically order disclosure of:

# the Crown's intended witnesses (ordered September 2, 1994),

1. the order in which these witnesses (exceeding 200 in number) would be called (ordered December 2, 1994),
2. a list of all the exhibits to be tendered by the Crown (ordered September 27, 1994), and
3. all Crown expert reports by November 15, 1994 (ordered October 18, 1994).

On February 1, 1995, nearly three years after the incident, the Crown disclosed 17 new documents that had been in their possession for at least two years, and about which they had unilaterally made a decision that there would be no disclosure. The Crown brought a motion to remove Justice Anderson from the case, and ask for a mistrial, stemming from Anderson calling the province's director of public prosecutions, Martin Herschorn, requesting lead Crown prosecutor Herman Felderhof be removed for incompetence. The motion was heard by Anderson, and he ruled that he did not show bias when he phoned Herschorn, thereby dismissing it on March 14.

On June 9, 1995, the charges were stayed by Justice Anderson on the grounds that prosecutors had deliberately failed to disclose key evidence to the defence. The stay was appealed to the Nova Scotia Court of Appeal, which ordered a new trial on November 30, 1995, stating that Justice Anderson showed bias, and committed errors in law when he stayed the trial. The order for a new trial was upheld by the Supreme Court of Canada on March 20, 1997, which criticized the trial judge for having called the director of prosecutions during the trial to complain about the manner in which prosecutors were conducting the case.

Two years after the Supreme Court ordered a new trial, prosecutors decided not to further pursue the charges on June 29, 1999, because they determined there was not enough evidence to secure convictions. In April 2000, a government report on the case's mishandling by the crown prosecutors was issued. This report recommended that special prosecutors' services should be set up to deal with cases involving major cases, and recommended that they also employ outside experts.

=== Inquiry ===
Six days after the explosion, the Nova Scotia provincial government launched a public inquiry into the Westray Mine and the safety issues resulting from the explosion. The commission was headed by Justice Kenneth Peter Richard of the Trial Division of the Supreme Court of Nova Scotia. The Inquiry was originally supposed to start hearings in mid-October, but lawyers representing senior Westray Coal employees successfully got it delayed on September 30 – on the basis that they thought the Inquiry was unconstitutional – because it would prevent their clients from receiving a fair trial, if they were ever charged. Nova Scotia Chief Justice Constance Glube ruled, on November 13, that the inquiry was unconstitutional, because she viewed it as a criminal investigation that would force deponents to incriminate themselves. Her decision was appealed, and a Nova Scotia Court of Appeals Tribunal ruled on January 19, 1993, that the inquiry was constitutional, but could only continue once all charges went through the court system, to preserve the employees' right to a fair trial.

When the inquiry resumed in 1995, Clifford Frame, the founder, principal shareholder, developer and chairman and CEO of Curragh Inc., the company whose subsidiary operated the mine, refused to take the stand and testify. Another powerful Curragh Inc. manager, Marvin Pelley, the former president of Westray, also refused to testify. The report was released on December 1, 1997, and recommended a sweeping overhaul of all provincial labour and mining laws and departments. Most of the report's recommendations were implemented.

=== Legislation ===
As a result of the failure to successfully prosecute the mine's owners and managers, the Canadian Labour Congress and some of its affiliates initiated an intense lobbying campaign in the mid-1990s to amend the Criminal Code of Canada in order to hold criminally liable managers and directors of corporations that failed to take steps to protect the lives of their employees. Using the tactic of having a private member's bill introduced, typically by an MP from the New Democratic Party or the Bloc Québécois, this agenda was advanced. Each time that the House of Commons was prorogued, the private members bill would die on the order paper, and the process would start again in the next session of Parliament. On about the fifth attempt, in late 2003, the federal government enacted Bill C-45 (sometimes referred to as the "Westray Bill") in direct response to the Westray Mine disaster.

The new law came into effect March 31, 2004. The bill provided a new regime outlining the framework of corporate liability in Canada. It also provided a new punishment scheme to allow the Courts not simply to fine corporations, but also to put them on probation to ensure that the offences were not repeated. However, some observers believed Bill C-45 was largely seen as an exercise of political posturing by the federal government, as it is doubtful that the new provisions would have had any effect on the legal implications of the disaster; due to the division of powers in the Canadian Constitution, the province is the only government that would be able to enact any real change.

Conversely, the United Steelworkers, the union that represented the miners and that spearheaded the lobbying effort, touted the law as an important new tool with which to hold accountable corporate leadership in on-the-job disasters. The key amendment to the Criminal Code reads as follows: "217.1 Every one who undertakes, or has the authority, to direct how another person does work or performs a task is under a legal duty to take reasonable steps to prevent bodily harm to that person, or any other person, arising from that work or task."

=== Memorial ===
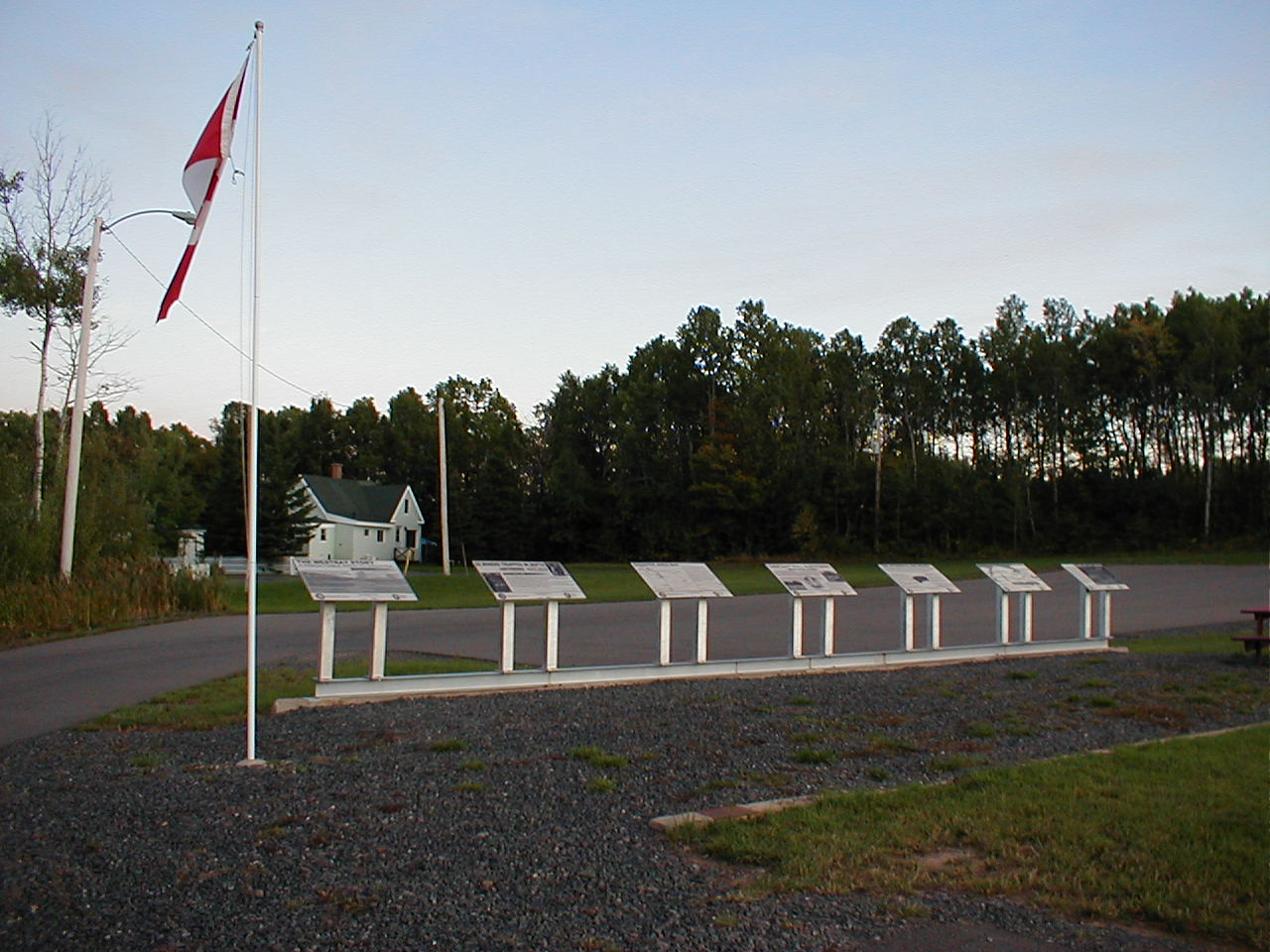
Westray Memorial in New Glasgow

Today, a memorial sits in a park in nearby New Glasgow at the approximate location above ground where the remaining 11 miners are trapped. The memorial lands were protected by the Nova Scotia government and further mineral exploration is prohibited within the 250-acre site. The memorial's central monument, engraved with the names and ages of the twenty-six men who lost their lives in the disaster states, "Their light shall always shine."

The names and ages of the 26 miners who were killed in the Westray coal mine disaster:

- John Thomas Bates, 56
- Larry Arthur Bell, 25
- Bennie Joseph Benoit, 42
- Wayne Michael Conway, 38
- Ferris Todd Dewan, 35
- Adonis J. Dollimont, 36
- Robert Steven Doyle, 22
- Rémi Joseph Drolet, 38
- Roy Edward Feltmate, 33
- Charles Robert Fraser, 29
- Myles Daniel Gillis, 32
- John Philip Halloran, 33
- Randolph Brian House, 27
- Trevor Martin Jahn, 36
- Laurence Elwyn James, 34
- Eugene W. Johnson, 33
- Stephen Paul Lilley, 40
- Michael Frederick MacKay, 38
- Angus Joseph MacNeil, 39
- Glenn David Martin, 35
- Harry A. McCallum, 41
- Eric Earl McIsaac, 38
- George S. James Munroe, 38
- Danny James Poplar, 39
- Romeo Andrew Short, 35
- Peter Francis Vickers, 38

== Razing of mine site ==
The former mine site was mostly razed in 1998. When the two 15-storey blue concrete coal storage silos were demolished on November 27, 1998, the most visible reminder of the tragedy was erased. The damaged mine shaft had been permanently sealed following the decision to abort further recovery attempts in May 1992 and after investigations were completed.

== Related works ==
The disaster was the subject of a 2001 National Film Board of Canada documentary Westray, written and directed by Paul Cowan. The film included dramatic reenactments by three Westray widows – Harriet Munroe, Vicki Drolet and Bernadette Feltmate – as well as miners Wayne Cheverie, Fraser Agnew and Carl Guptill. The film won the award for best documentary at the 22nd Genie Awards.

An exhibit at the Nova Scotia Museum of Industry in nearby Stellarton explores the history of the mine and the disaster. Leo McKay Jr. wrote an acclaimed fictionalization about these events, in the novel Twenty Six. The band Weeping Tile recorded a song about the disaster, entitled Westray. Different arrangements of the song were featured on their 1994 album Eepee and their 1996 album Cold Snap. The song was written by band member Sarah Harmer.

== See also ==
- Springhill mining disaster
- Pioneer Coal Mine
