= Pictou Centre =

Provincial electoral district in Nova Scotia, Canada

Nova Scotia electoral district

Provincial electoral district
- Legislature: Nova Scotia House of Assembly
MLA
Danny MacGillivray
Progressive Conservative
- District created: 1949
- First contested: 1949
- Last contested: 2024

Demographics
- Population (2011): 16,100
- Electors: 12,860
- Area (km²): 26
- Pop. density (per km²): 619.2
- Census division: Pictou County
- Census subdivision(s): New Glasgow, Stellarton, Trenton

Pictou Centre is a provincial electoral district in Nova Scotia, Canada, that elects one member of the Nova Scotia House of Assembly.

== Members of the Legislative Assembly ==
This riding has elected the following members of the Legislative Assembly:

Pictou Centre
| Legislature | Years | Member | Party |
|---|---|---|---|
| 44th | 1949–1953 | Alfred B. DeWolfe | Liberal |
| 45th | 1953–1956 | Alfred B. DeWolfe | Liberal |
| 46th | 1956–1960 | Donald R. MacLeod | Progressive Conservative |
| 47th | 1960–1963 | Donald R. MacLeod | Progressive Conservative |
| 48th | 1963–1967 | Donald R. MacLeod | Progressive Conservative |
| 49th | 1967–1970 | Donald R. MacLeod | Progressive Conservative |
| 50th | 1970–1974 | Ralph F. Fiske | Liberal |
| 51st | 1974–1977 | Fraser MacLean | Progressive Conservative |
| 51st | 1977–1978 | Jack MacIsaac | Progressive Conservative |
| 52nd | 1978–1981 | Jack MacIsaac | Progressive Conservative |
| 53rd | 1981–1984 | Jack MacIsaac | Progressive Conservative |
| 54th | 1984–1988 | Jack MacIsaac | Progressive Conservative |
| 55th | 1988–1993 | Jack MacIsaac | Progressive Conservative |
| 56th | 1993–1998 | John Hamm | Progressive Conservative |
| 57th | 1998–1999 | John Hamm | Progressive Conservative |
| 58th | 1999–2003 | John Hamm | Progressive Conservative |
| 59th | 2003–2006 | John Hamm | Progressive Conservative |
| 60th | 2006–2009 | Pat Dunn | Progressive Conservative |
| 61st | 2009–2013 | Ross Landry | New Democratic |
| 62nd | 2013–2017 | Pat Dunn | Progressive Conservative |
| 63rd | 2017–2021 | Pat Dunn | Progressive Conservative |
| 64th | 2021–2024 | Pat Dunn | Progressive Conservative |
| 65th | 2024–present | Danny MacGillivray | Progressive Conservative |

== Election results ==
=== 2024 ===
2024 Nova Scotia general election
| Party | Candidate | Votes | % | ±% |
|---|---|---|---|---|
| Progressive Conservative | Danny MacGillivray | 3,741 | 67.61 | +11.84 |
| Liberal | Kris MacFarlane | 972 | 17.57 | -13.36 |
| New Democratic | Mary Stewart | 820 | 14.82 | +3.07 |
| Total valid votes | | 5,533 | | |
| Total rejected ballots | | 38 | | |
| Turnout | | 5,571 | 41.11 | |
| Eligible voters | | 13,553 | | |
| Progressive Conservative hold | | Swing | | |
Source: Elections Nova Scotia

=== 2021 ===
2021 Nova Scotia general election
| Party | Candidate | Votes | % | ±% | Expenditures |
|---|---|---|---|---|---|
| Progressive Conservative | Pat Dunn | 4,092 | 55.77 | +3.34 | $42,138.84 |
| Liberal | Jim McKenna | 2,269 | 30.93 | +2.76 | $42,741.61 |
| New Democratic | Vernon Theriault | 862 | 11.75 | -7.65 | $24,983.08 |
| Green | Laura Moore | 114 | 1.55 | | $200.00 |
| Total valid votes/expense limit | | 7,337 | 99.54 | – | $76,534.03 |
| Total rejected ballots | | 34 | 0.46 | | |
| Turnout | | 7,371 | 57.07 | | |
| Eligible voters | | 12,916 | | | |
| Progressive Conservative hold | | Swing | | +0.29 | |
Source: Elections Nova Scotia

=== 2017 ===
2017 Nova Scotia general election
| Party | Candidate | Votes | % | ±% |
|---|---|---|---|---|
| Progressive Conservative | Pat Dunn | 3,773 | 52.43 | +0.17 |
| Liberal | Jeff Davis | 2,027 | 28.17 | +10.34 |
| New Democratic | Henderson Paris | 1,396 | 19.40 | -10.51 |
| Total valid votes | | 7,196 | 100.00 | |
| Total rejected ballots | | 28 | 0.39 | -0.41 |
| Turnout | | 7,224 | 55.86 | -5.48 |
| Eligible voters | | 12,932 | | |
| Progressive Conservative hold | | Swing | | -5.08 |
Source: Elections Nova Scotia

=== 2013 ===
2013 Nova Scotia general election
| Party | Candidate | Votes | % | ±% |
|---|---|---|---|---|
| Progressive Conservative | Pat Dunn | 4,147 | 52.26 | 7.62 |
| New Democratic | Ross Landry | 2,373 | 29.91 | -16.40 |
| Liberal | Bill Muirhead | 1,415 | 17.83 | 10.64 |
| Total | | 7,935 | – | |
Source(s) Source: Nova Scotia Legislature (2024). "Electoral History for Pictou Centre" (PDF). nslegislature.ca. Nova Scotia, Chief Electoral Officer (2013). 39th Provincial General Election, October 8, 2013: Volume 1 – Statement of Votes & Statistics (PDF) (Report). Elections Nova Scotia. Archived from the original (PDF) on 10 April 2018.

=== 2009 ===
2009 Nova Scotia general election
| Party | Candidate | Votes | % | ±% |
|---|---|---|---|---|
| New Democratic | Ross Landry | 3,650 | 46.30 | 14.69 |
| Progressive Conservative | Pat Dunn | 3,519 | 44.64 | -7.96 |
| Liberal | Neil MacIsaac | 567 | 7.19 | -7.06 |
| Green | Jim Lindsey | 147 | 1.86 | 0.60 |
| Total | | 7,883 | – | |
Source(s) Source: Nova Scotia Legislature (2024). "Electoral History for Pictou Centre" (PDF). nslegislature.ca.

=== 2006 ===
2006 Nova Scotia general election
| Party | Candidate | Votes | % | ±% |
|---|---|---|---|---|
| Progressive Conservative | Pat Dunn | 3,901 | 52.60 | -2.09 |
| New Democratic | Danny MacGillivray | 2,344 | 31.61 | 11.45 |
| Liberal | Troy MacCullogh | 1,057 | 14.25 | -8.71 |
| Green | Samuel M. Clark | 94 | 1.27 | – |
| Independent | Dennis Tate | 20 | 0.27 | – |
| Total | | 7,416 | – | |
Source(s) Source: Nova Scotia Legislature (2024). "Electoral History for Pictou Centre" (PDF). nslegislature.ca.

=== 2003 ===
2003 Nova Scotia general election
| Party | Candidate | Votes | % | ±% |
|---|---|---|---|---|
| Progressive Conservative | John Hamm | 4,262 | 54.70 | -9.76 |
| Liberal | Tim Daley | 1,789 | 22.96 | 9.18 |
| New Democratic | Alex MacIsaac | 1,571 | 20.16 | -1.60 |
| Marijuana | Darryl Gallivan | 170 | 2.18 | – |
| Total | | 7,792 | – | |
Source(s) Source: Nova Scotia Legislature (2024). "Electoral History for Pictou Centre" (PDF). nslegislature.ca.

=== 1999 ===
1999 Nova Scotia general election
| Party | Candidate | Votes | % | ±% |
|---|---|---|---|---|
| Progressive Conservative | John Hamm | 5,479 | 64.46 | 8.03 |
| New Democratic | Jeff Callaghan | 1,850 | 21.76 | 1.87 |
| Liberal | Marie Maxwell | 1,171 | 13.78 | -9.90 |
| Total | | 8,500 | – | |
Source(s) Source: Nova Scotia Legislature (2024). "Electoral History for Pictou Centre" (PDF). nslegislature.ca. Nova Scotia, Chief Electoral Officer (1999). Returns of the General Election for the House of Assembly, Thirty-Fifth General Election (Report). Elections Nova Scotia.

=== 1998 ===
1998 Nova Scotia general election
| Party | Candidate | Votes | % | ±% |
|---|---|---|---|---|
| Progressive Conservative | John Hamm | 5,037 | 56.42 | 9.03 |
| Liberal | Roseanne Skoke | 2,114 | 23.68 | -19.05 |
| New Democratic | Judy Hughes | 1,776 | 19.89 | 10.02 |
| Total | | 8,927 | – | |
Source(s) Source: Nova Scotia Legislature (2024). "Electoral History for Pictou Centre" (PDF). nslegislature.ca.

=== 1993 ===
1993 Nova Scotia general election
| Party | Candidate | Votes | % | ±% |
|---|---|---|---|---|
| Progressive Conservative | John Hamm | 4,840 | 47.40 | -10.41 |
| Liberal | Marg Daley | 4,364 | 42.73 | 15.30 |
| New Democratic | Cecil MacNeil | 1,008 | 9.87 | -4.89 |
| Total | | 10,212 | – | |
Source(s) Source: Nova Scotia Legislature (2024). "Electoral History for Pictou Centre" (PDF). nslegislature.ca. Nova Scotia, Chief Electoral Officer (1993). Returns of the General Election for the House of Assembly, Thirty-Third General Election (PDF) (Report). Queen's Printer. Archived from the original (PDF) on 18 June 2018.

=== 1988 ===
1988 Nova Scotia general election
| Party | Candidate | Votes | % | ±% |
|---|---|---|---|---|
| Progressive Conservative | Jack MacIsaac | 6,566 | 57.80 | -9.30 |
| Liberal | Bob Leahy | 3,116 | 27.43 | 6.04 |
| New Democratic | Gerard Currie | 1,677 | 14.76 | 3.27 |
| Total | | 11,359 | – | |
Source(s) Source: Nova Scotia Legislature (2024). "Electoral History for Pictou Centre" (PDF). nslegislature.ca. Nova Scotia, Chief Electoral Officer (1988). Returns of the General Election for the House of Assembly, Thirty-Second General Election (PDF) (Report). Queen's Printer. Archived from the original (PDF) on 7 July 2018.

=== 1984 ===
1984 Nova Scotia general election
| Party | Candidate | Votes | % | ±% |
|---|---|---|---|---|
| Progressive Conservative | Jack MacIsaac | 6,596 | 67.11 | 7.48 |
| Liberal | Bob Leahy | 2,103 | 21.40 | -2.14 |
| New Democratic | Fraser (Kim) Murray | 1,130 | 11.50 | -5.35 |
| Total | | 9,829 | – | |
Source(s) Source: Nova Scotia Legislature (2024). "Electoral History for Pictou Centre" (PDF). nslegislature.ca. Nova Scotia, Chief Electoral Officer (1984). Returns of the General Election for the House of Assembly, Thirty-First General Election (PDF) (Report). Queen's Printer. Archived from the original (PDF) on 31 July 2017.

=== 1981 ===
1981 Nova Scotia general election
| Party | Candidate | Votes | % | ±% |
|---|---|---|---|---|
| Progressive Conservative | Jack MacIsaac | 6,673 | 59.62 | 7.27 |
| Liberal | Tom DeWolfe | 2,634 | 23.53 | 3.54 |
| New Democratic | Fraser (Kim) Murray | 1,885 | 16.84 | -9.68 |
| Total | | 11,192 | – | |
Source(s) Source: Nova Scotia Legislature (2024). "Electoral History for Pictou Centre" (PDF). nslegislature.ca. Nova Scotia, Chief Electoral Officer (1981). Returns of the General Election for the House of Assembly, Thirtieth General Election (PDF) (Report). Queen's Printer. Archived from the original (PDF) on 31 July 2017.

=== 1978 ===
1978 Nova Scotia general election
| Party | Candidate | Votes | % | ±% |
|---|---|---|---|---|
| Progressive Conservative | Jack MacIsaac | 6,056 | 52.36 | 5.60 |
| New Democratic | Austin Sutton | 3,068 | 26.52 | 0.61 |
| Liberal | Erskine Cumming | 2,313 | 20.00 | -7.34 |
| Independent | Jim Beck | 130 | 1.12 | – |
| Total | | 11,567 | – | |
Source(s) Source: Nova Scotia Legislature (2024). "Electoral History for Pictou Centre" (PDF). nslegislature.ca. Nova Scotia, Chief Electoral Officer (1978). Returns of the General Election for the House of Assembly, Twenty-Ninth General Election (PDF) (Report). Queen's Printer. Archived from the original (PDF) on 18 June 2018.

=== 1977 ===
Nova Scotia provincial by-election, 1977-09-06
| Party | Candidate | Votes | % | ±% |
|---|---|---|---|---|
| Progressive Conservative | Jack MacIsaac | 5,560 | 46.76 | 2.96 |
| Liberal | Merritt Crawford | 3,250 | 27.33 | -15.21 |
| New Democratic | Austin Sutton | 3,081 | 25.91 | 12.25 |
| Total | | 11,891 | – | |
Source(s) Source: Nova Scotia Legislature (2024). "Electoral History for Pictou Centre" (PDF). nslegislature.ca.

=== 1974 ===
1974 Nova Scotia general election
| Party | Candidate | Votes | % | ±% |
|---|---|---|---|---|
| Progressive Conservative | Fraser MacLean | 5,100 | 43.80 | 0.04 |
| Liberal | Lawrence MacKinnon | 4,954 | 42.54 | -5.07 |
| New Democratic | Dave MacKenzie | 1,591 | 13.66 | 5.02 |
| Total | | 11,645 | – | |
Source(s) Source: Nova Scotia Legislature (2024). "Electoral History for Pictou Centre" (PDF). nslegislature.ca. Nova Scotia, Chief Electoral Officer (1974). Returns of the General Election for the House of Assembly, Twenty-Eighth General Election (PDF) (Report). Queen's Printer. Archived from the original (PDF) on 18 June 2018.

=== 1970 ===
1970 Nova Scotia general election
| Party | Candidate | Votes | % | ±% |
|---|---|---|---|---|
| Liberal | Ralph F. Fiske | 5,356 | 47.61 | 9.33 |
| Progressive Conservative | Donald R. MacLeod | 4,922 | 43.75 | -10.15 |
| New Democratic | Derrick P. Kearley | 972 | 8.64 | 0.82 |
| Total | | 11,250 | – | |
Source(s) Source: Nova Scotia Legislature (2024). "Electoral History for Pictou Centre" (PDF). nslegislature.ca. Nova Scotia, Legislative Assembly (1970). Returns of the General Election for the House of Assembly, 1970 (PDF) (Report). Queen's Printer. Archived from the original (PDF) on 25 July 2018.

=== 1967 ===
1967 Nova Scotia general election
| Party | Candidate | Votes | % | ±% |
|---|---|---|---|---|
| Progressive Conservative | Donald R. MacLeod | 5,416 | 53.90 | -6.31 |
| Liberal | John (Brother) MacDonald | 3,846 | 38.28 | -1.51 |
| New Democratic | John Markie | 786 | 7.82 | – |
| Total | | 10,048 | – | |
Source(s) Source: Nova Scotia Legislature (2024). "Electoral History for Pictou Centre" (PDF). nslegislature.ca. Nova Scotia Legislature (1967). Returns of the General Election for the House of Assembly (PDF) (Report). Queen's Printer. Archived from the original (PDF) on 25 July 2018.

=== 1963 ===
1963 Nova Scotia general election
| Party | Candidate | Votes | % | ±% |
|---|---|---|---|---|
| Progressive Conservative | Donald R. MacLeod | 5,752 | 60.21 | 16.29 |
| Liberal | Thomas H. Fraser | 3,801 | 39.79 | 6.40 |
| Total | | 9,553 | – | |
Source(s) Source: Nova Scotia Legislature (2024). "Electoral History for Pictou Centre" (PDF). nslegislature.ca. Nova Scotia Legislature (1963). Returns of the General Election for the House of Assembly (PDF) (Report). Queen's Printer. Archived from the original (PDF) on 25 July 2018.

=== 1960 ===
1960 Nova Scotia general election
| Party | Candidate | Votes | % | ±% |
|---|---|---|---|---|
| Progressive Conservative | Donald R. MacLeod | 4,755 | 43.92 | -7.61 |
| Liberal | James H. Power | 3,615 | 33.39 | -15.07 |
| Co-operative Commonwealth | Doris Nicholson | 2,456 | 22.69 | – |
| Total | | 10,826 | – | |
Source(s) Source: Nova Scotia Legislature (2024). "Electoral History for Pictou Centre" (PDF). nslegislature.ca. Nova Scotia Legislature (1960). Returns of the General Election for the House of Assembly (PDF) (Report). Queen's Printer. Archived from the original (PDF) on 25 July 2018.

=== 1956 ===
1956 Nova Scotia general election
| Party | Candidate | Votes | % | ±% |
|---|---|---|---|---|
| Progressive Conservative | Donald R. MacLeod | 5,639 | 51.54 | 11.59 |
| Liberal | A. T. Logan | 5,303 | 48.46 | 3.05 |
| Total | | 10,942 | – | |
Source(s) Source: Nova Scotia Legislature (2024). "Electoral History for Pictou Centre" (PDF). nslegislature.ca. Nova Scotia Legislature (1956). Returns of the General Election for the House of Assembly (PDF) (Report). Queen's Printer. Archived from the original (PDF) on 10 September 2018.

=== 1953 ===
1953 Nova Scotia general election
| Party | Candidate | Votes | % | ±% |
|---|---|---|---|---|
| Liberal | Alfred B. DeWolfe | 5,155 | 45.41 | -2.07 |
| Progressive Conservative | Robert D. MacDonald | 4,534 | 39.94 | -0.50 |
| Co-operative Commonwealth | Donald Nicholson | 1,662 | 14.64 | 2.57 |
| Total | | 11,351 | – | |
Source(s) Source: Nova Scotia Legislature (2024). "Electoral History for Pictou Centre" (PDF). nslegislature.ca. Nova Scotia Legislature (1953). Returns of the General Election for the House of Assembly (PDF) (Report). Queen's Printer. Archived from the original (PDF) on 10 September 2018.

=== 1949 ===
1949 Nova Scotia general election
| Party | Candidate | Votes | % | ±% |
|---|---|---|---|---|
| Liberal | Alfred B. DeWolfe | 5,283 | 47.49 | – |
| Progressive Conservative | John A. MacGregor | 4,499 | 40.44 | – |
| Co-operative Commonwealth | Alvin M. Stewart | 1,343 | 12.07 | – |
| Total | | 11,125 | – | |
Source(s) Source: Nova Scotia Legislature (2024). "Electoral History for Pictou Centre" (PDF). nslegislature.ca. Nova Scotia Legislature (1949). Returns of the General Election for the House of Assembly (PDF) (Report). Queen's Printer. Archived from the original (PDF) on 10 September 2018.

== See also ==
- List of Nova Scotia provincial electoral districts
- Canadian provincial electoral districts
