= Ross Landry =

Canadian politician

The Honourable Ross Landry ECNS

Member of the Nova Scotia House of Assembly for Pictou Centre
- In office June 19, 2009 – October 8, 2013
- Preceded by: Pat Dunn
- Succeeded by: Pat Dunn

Attorney General and Minister of Justice and Provincial Secretary of Nova Scotia
- In office June 19, 2009 – October 22, 2013
- Preceded by: Cecil Clarke
- Succeeded by: Lena Diab

Personal details
- Born: Trenton, Nova Scotia, Canada
- Party: New Democratic
- Occupation: police officer

Peter Ross Landry is a retired Canadian police officer and politician.

== Early life and career ==
Landry was born in Trenton, Nova Scotia. He served in the Royal Canadian Mounted Police for 34 years.

== Political career ==
In December 2008, Landry won the Nova Scotia New Democratic Party (NDP) nomination in the provincial riding of Pictou Centre. Landry was elected in the 2009 provincial election and represented the riding until his defeat in the 2013 provincial election.

Landry was appointed to the Executive Council of Nova Scotia on June 19, 2009 where he served as Minister of Justice and Attorney General of Nova Scotia until October 22, 2013.

On July 13, 2015, Landry announced that he was seeking the New Democratic Party nomination in the Central Nova riding for the 42nd Canadian federal election. He won the nomination on July 26; in the election on October 19, he finished in third place behind Liberal Sean Fraser and Conservative Fred DeLorey.

2015 Canadian federal election: Central Nova
Party	Candidate	Votes	%	±%	Expenditures
Liberal	Sean Fraser	25,909	58.53	+44.58	$113,362.49
Conservative	Fred DeLorey	11,418	25.80	–29.49	$109,137.26
New Democratic	Ross Landry	4,532	10.24	–16.57	$63,038.54
Green	David Hachey	1,834	4.14	+0.34	$11,206.15
Independent	Alexander J. MacKenzie	570	1.29	–	–
Total valid votes/expense limit		44,263	100.00		$204,540.28
Total rejected ballots		233	0.52		
Turnout		44,496	74.68		
Eligible voters		59,585			
Liberal gain from Conservative		Swing		+37.04	
Source: Elections Canada
