= Donald R. MacLeod =

Canadian politician

MLA for Pictou Centre
- In office 1956–1970
- Preceded by: Alfred B. DeWolfe
- Succeeded by: Ralph F. Fiske

Personal details
- Born: Donald Ross MacLeod; December 30, 1902 Trenton, Nova Scotia
- Died: October 20, 1976 (aged 73) New Glasgow, Nova Scotia
- Party: Progressive Conservative
- Occupation: druggist

Donald Ross MacLeod (December 30, 1902 – October 20, 1976) was a Canadian politician. He represented the electoral district of Pictou Centre in the Nova Scotia House of Assembly from 1956 to 1970. He was a member of the Progressive Conservative Party of Nova Scotia.

Born in 1902 at Trenton, Nova Scotia, MacLeod graduated from Dalhousie University and was a druggist by career. He married Ivy Verona Phillips in 1935.

From 1944 to 1946, MacLeod served as mayor of New Glasgow, Nova Scotia. MacLeod entered provincial politics in the 1956 election, winning the Pictou Centre riding by 336 votes. He was re-elected in the 1960, and 1963 elections. In July 1964, MacLeod was appointed to the Executive Council of Nova Scotia as Minister without portfolio. He was re-elected in the 1967 election. In the 1970 election, MacLeod was defeated by Liberal Ralph F. Fiske. MacLeod died at New Glasgow on October 20, 1976.
