= Bradyll =

Bradyll or Braddyll Can refer to:-

== People ==
- Wilson Gale-Braddyll
- Colonel Thomas Bradyll - Owner of the South Hetton Colliery in the 1830s.

== Transportation ==
- Bradyll (locomotive) an early steam locomotive.
