= Pioneer Coal Limited =

Canadian mining company

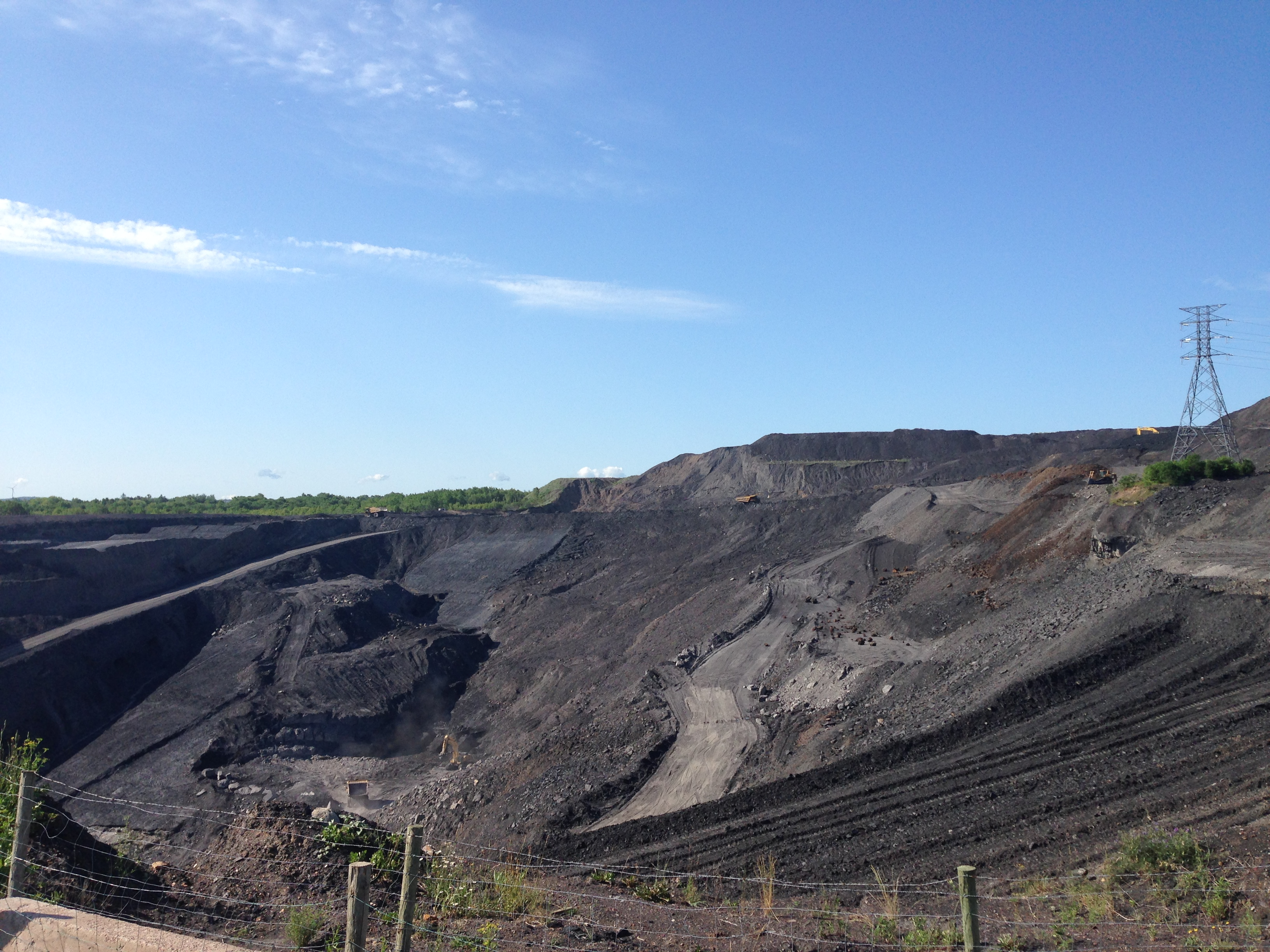
- Company type: Reclamation mining
- Industry: Mining
- Founded: 1980
- Founder: John Chisholm (1946-2014)
- Headquarters: Antigonish, Nova Scotia, Canada
- Area served: Nova Scotia
- Key people: Donald Chisholm, President
- Products: Coal
- Owner: Private

Pioneer Coal Limited is a Canadian mining company based in Antigonish, Nova Scotia.

It was founded in 1980 by John Chisholm, owner of Nova Construction Company Limited. The company currently operates one open pit coal mine:

- Point Aconi Surface Coal Mine, located in Point Aconi, Nova Scotia

The open-pit mine is operated as a reclamation mine in an area that used to have underground mining operations. After surface mining has been completed, the land is reclaimed for other uses.

In 2014 the company began a feasibility study to evaluate an additional surface coal mine near Springhill, Nova Scotia.

Pioneer Coal operated the Stellarton Surface Coal Mine, located in Stellarton, Nova Scotia until 2022 when the company ceased actively mining there and began reclamation work on the now former mine.
