= Jack MacIsaac =

Canadian politician (born 1939)

The Honourable Jack MacIsaac ECNS

MLA for Pictou Centre
- In office 1977–1993
- Preceded by: Fraser MacLean
- Succeeded by: John Hamm

Personal details
- Born: John A. MacIsaac; June 23, 1939 (age 87) Inverness, Nova Scotia
- Party: Progressive Conservative
- Occupation: Insurance agent

John A. "Jack" MacIsaac (born June 23, 1939) is a Canadian politician. He represented the electoral district of Pictou Centre in the Nova Scotia House of Assembly from 1977 to 1993. He was a member of the Progressive Conservative Party of Nova Scotia.

== Early life ==
MacIsaac was born in 1939 at Inverness, Nova Scotia. He was an insurance agent in New Glasgow, Nova Scotia,

== Political career ==
MacIsaac entered provincial politics in 1977, winning a by-election for the Pictou Centre riding. MacIsaac was re-elected in the 1978 election, that resulted in a majority government for the Progressive Conservatives led by John Buchanan. He was re-elected in the 1981, 1984, and 1988 general elections.

When Buchanan was sworn in as premier on October 5, 1978, he appointed MacIsaac to the Executive Council of Nova Scotia as Minister of Social Services. He later served in cabinet as Minister of Municipal Affairs, Minister of Labour, Minister of Transportation, Minister of Tourism, Minister of Lands and Forests, and Minister of Mines and Energy.

MacIsaac quit the cabinet in February 1991, and did not seek re-election in the 1993 election.
