= Ralph F. Fiske =

Canadian politician (1931–2017)

The Honourable Ralph F. Fiske ECNS
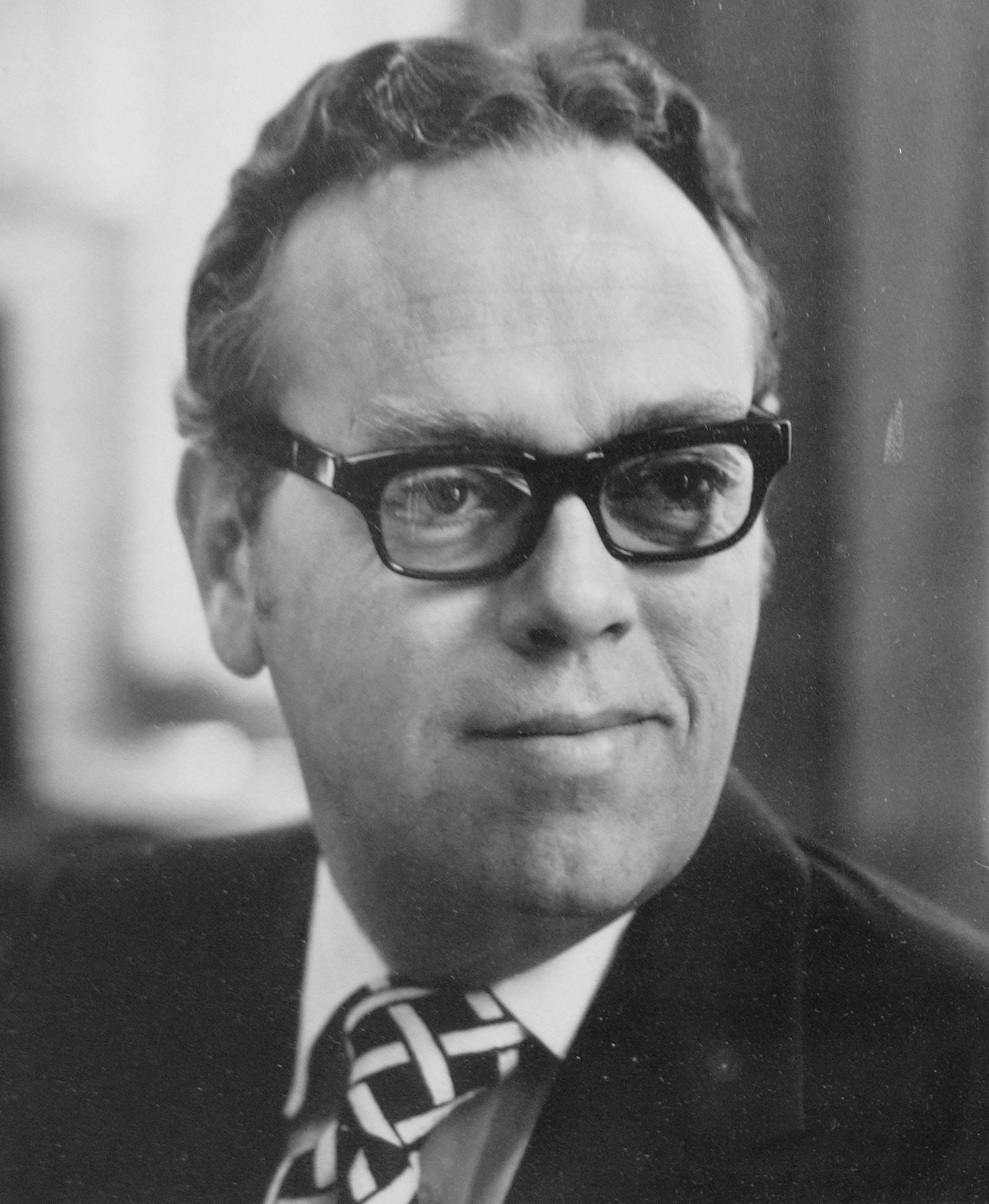
- Fiske, c. 1973

MLA for Pictou Centre
- In office 1970–1974
- Preceded by: Donald R. MacLeod
- Succeeded by: Fraser MacLean

Personal details
- Born: July 1, 1931 Clarence, Nova Scotia
- Died: January 19, 2017 (aged 85) Halifax, Nova Scotia
- Party: Liberal
- Occupation: Business executive

Ralph Ferguson Fiske (July 1, 1931 – January 19, 2017) was a Canadian politician. He represented the electoral district of Pictou Centre in the Nova Scotia House of Assembly from 1970 to 1974. He is a member of the Nova Scotia Liberal Party.

== Early life ==
Fiske was born in Clarence, Nova Scotia, and graduated from high school in Annapolis, Nova Scotia. Growing up on a wood mill run by his father, he began his business career working in the bank. Later to become an entrepreneur, businessman, restaurateur, and motel/hotel owner/operator.

== Political career ==
Fiske entered provincial politics in the 1970 election, defeating Progressive Conservative incumbent Donald R. MacLeod by 434 votes in Pictou Centre. On October 28, 1970, Fiske was appointed to the Executive Council of Nova Scotia as Provincial Secretary and Minister of Trade and Industry. On July 15, 1971, Gerald Regan shuffled his cabinet, moving Fiske to Minister of Development. He remained as Provincial Secretary until another shuffle in November 1971. Fiske resigned from cabinet prior to an August 1973 cabinet shuffle, and did not seek re-election in 1974.

== After politics ==
He later served as Chairman of the Nova Scotia Gaming Commission. Although forced to resign due to indiscretions between the Halifax Casino and the government at the time, his claims were found to be truthful. "When Nova Scotia Gaming Corporation's former chairman Ralph Fiske's wrongful dismissal suit went to trial last May, one canny Halifax lawyer voiced surprise that Fiske planned to call only two witnesses: himself and former finance minister Bill Gillis. Arrayed against him were seventeen members of Nova Scotia's political, bureaucratic, and legal establishment: former premiers, cabinet ministers, and deputy ministers from the premier's office; officials of the gaming corporation; and a clutch of Liberal lawyers from the province's best-connected law firms. Yesterday, Fiske touched home plate in near total victory. Gruchy found that political interference in the gaming corporation's administration of the Sheraton Casino project rendered Fiske's position untenable and forced him to resign. Nova Scotian's should celebrate this moment, rare in our recent history, when a lone civil servant proved that courage and integrity can overcome the mediocrity that corrupts governance in this province. When future civil servants are forced to choose between doing the right thing and the politically easy thing, Fiske's example will beckon them toward duty"

== Personal life ==
One of 5 boys, Brothers - Don, was a pilot and shot down in WWII, John Fiske, Fred Fiske, Leon Fiske, (and 2 sisters who died at birth). He married Claire Longley of Bridgetown, Nova Scotia, and has three children, Heather, Alan and Shari. He died on January 19, 2017, at the age of 85.
