= 51st Nova Scotia general election =

The 51st Nova Scotia general election may refer to

- the 1974 Nova Scotia general election, the 50th overall general election for Nova Scotia, for the (due to a counting error in 1859) 51st General Assembly of Nova Scotia, or
- the 1978 Nova Scotia general election, the 51st overall general election for Nova Scotia, for the 52nd General Assembly of Nova Scotia, but considered the 29th general election for the Canadian province of Nova Scotia.
