= Stellarton Surface Coal Mine =

Coal mine in Nova Scotia, Canada

Coordinates: 45°33′56.5″N 62°40′30.4″W

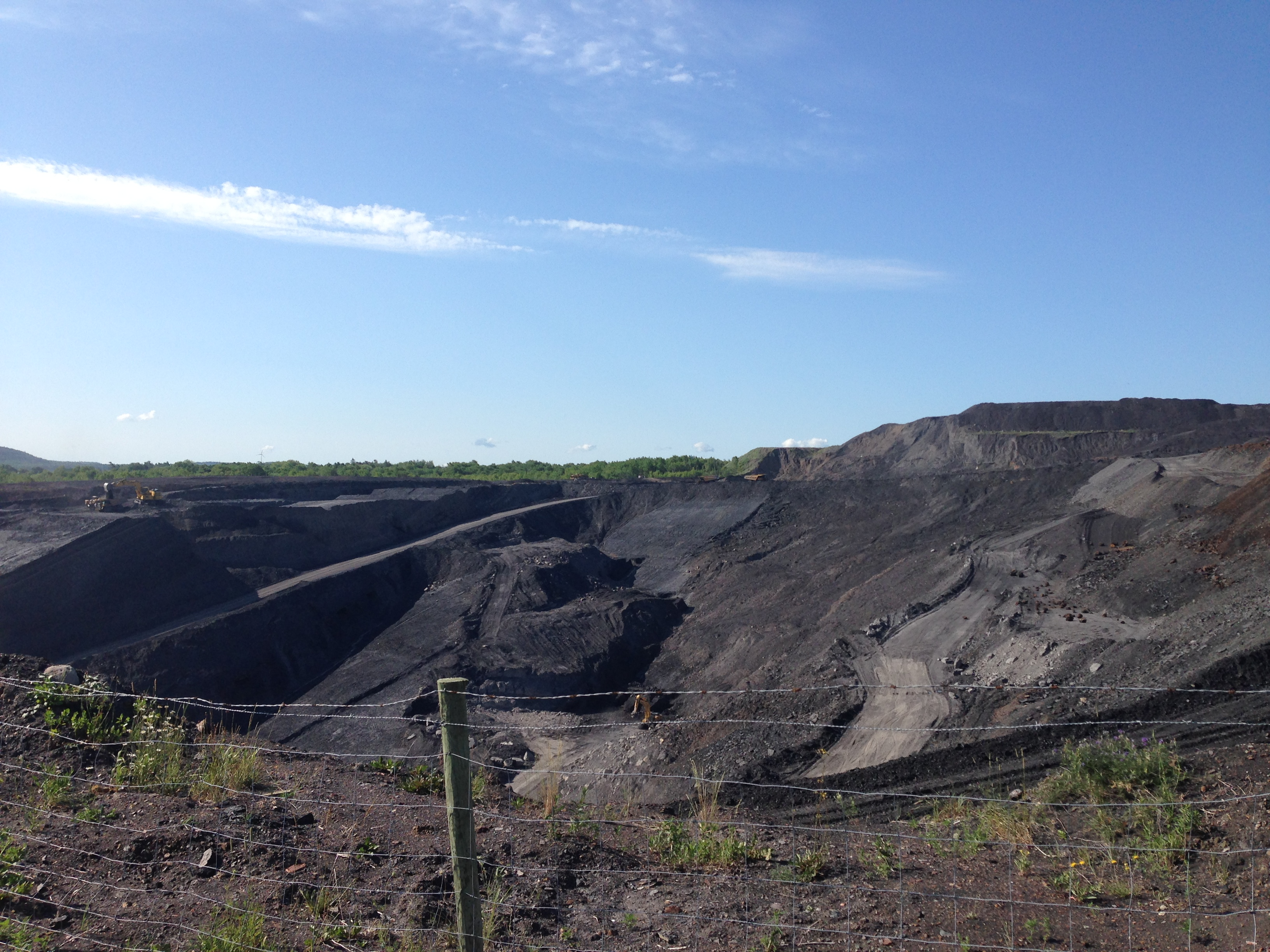
Pioneer Coal Mine in 2015

The Stellarton Surface Coal Mine was an open pit reclamation coal mine located in Stellarton, Nova Scotia. It was operated by Pioneer Coal Limited.

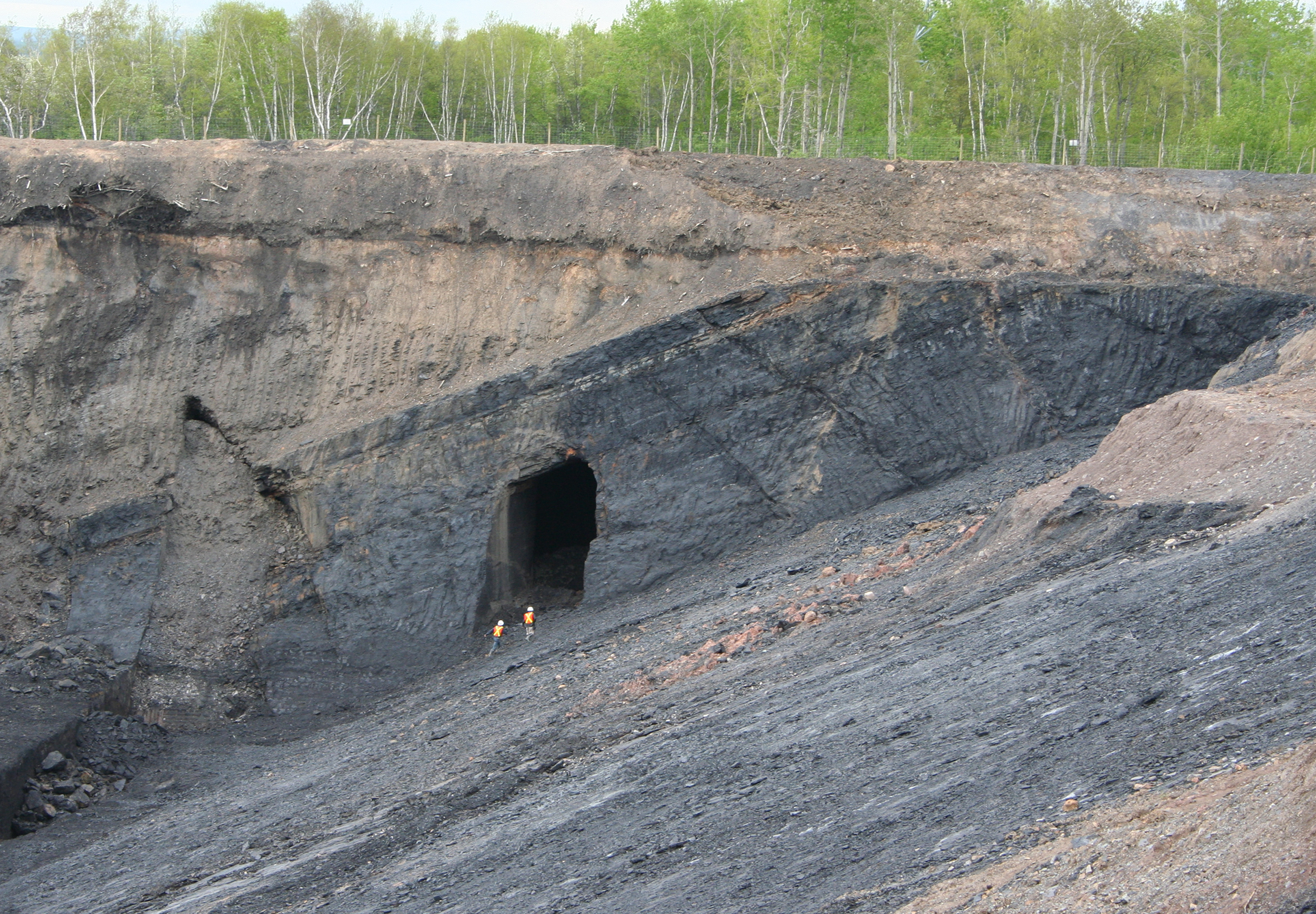
Abandoned tunnel at the edge of the Stellarton pit

== Operations ==
The mine began operations in 1996 and coal was extracted using truck and shovel mining. Coal mining has taken place in this area of Pictou County for more than 400 years, and until the Donkin Mine reopened in 2017, the pit was the only operating coal mine in Nova Scotia. Underground mining previously took place in the area where the Stellarton pit was located and occasionally remnants of the abandoned tunnels from underground mining could be seen on the pit walls while the mine was still in operation. In 2022 Pioneer Coal ceased actively mining in Stellarton and began reclamation work on the now former mine.

== See also ==
- Pioneer Coal Limited
- Westray Mine
