= Fraser MacLean =

Canadian politician

D. Fraser MacLean

MLA for Pictou Centre
- In office 1974–1976
- Preceded by: Ralph F. Fiske
- Succeeded by: Jack MacIsaac

Personal details
- Born: December 18, 1937 (age 88) New Glasgow, Nova Scotia
- Party: Progressive Conservative
- Occupation: Businessman

Donald Fraser MacLean (born December 18, 1937) was a Canadian politician. He represented the electoral district of Pictou Centre in the Nova Scotia House of Assembly from 1974 to 1976. He was a member of the Nova Scotia Progressive Conservative Party.

MacLean was born in New Glasgow, Nova Scotia. He was educated at St. Francis Xavier University and was a businessman. In 1957, he was married to Virginia Allan Brooks. MacLean entered provincial politics in the 1974 election, when he defeated his Liberal opponent by 146 votes in Pictou Centre. MacLean resigned as MLA in 1976 for business reasons.
