= 50th Nova Scotia general election =

The 50th Nova Scotia general election may refer to

- the 1970 Nova Scotia general election, the 49th overall general election for Nova Scotia, for the (due to a counting error in 1859) 50th General Assembly of Nova Scotia, or
- the 1974 Nova Scotia general election, the 50th overall general election for Nova Scotia, for the 51st General Assembly of Nova Scotia, but considered the 28th general election for the Canadian province of Nova Scotia.
