= Leo McKay Jr. =

Canadian writer

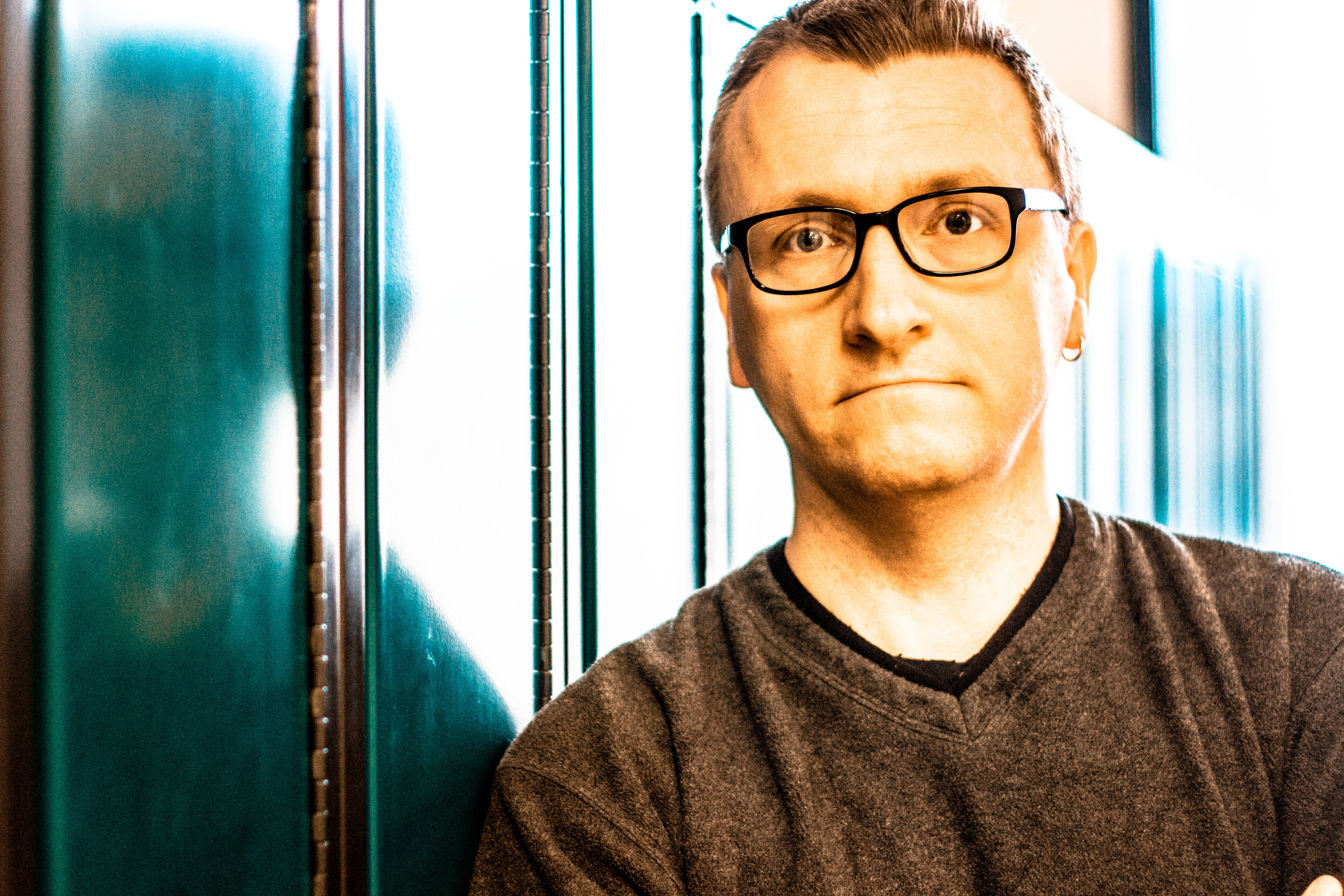
- Born: 19 June 1964 (age 62); Stellarton, Nova Scotia
- Writing career
- Years active: 1996–present

Leo McKay Jr. (born June 19, 1964) is a Canadian novelist and short story writer from Stellarton, Nova Scotia. He also is a periodic contributor to The Globe and Mail.

== Early life ==
McKay was born and raised in the town of Stellarton, Nova Scotia, where he graduated from Stellarton High School in 1982. He grew up in the small working class Stellarton neighbourhood called the Red Row, a neighbourhood of hundred-year-old mining company duplexes and a tight-knit community of working-class people. His parents grew up in the same neighbourhood. His mother, Georgina Bellick, was the daughter of Polish and Ukrainian immigrants. His father, Leo McKay Sr., who lived in the Red Row until his death in 2011, was a riveter at the railcar factory in nearby Trenton before becoming a career labour leader, social activist, New Democrat politician, and eventually a member of Stellarton Town Council.

He studied English at St. Francis Xavier University, French at Laval, Creative Writing at the University of British Columbia, and Education at Dalhousie. He lived in Asia for four years.

== Career ==
McKay formerly taught English at Cobequid Educational Centre in Truro, Nova Scotia, until 2024. As of 2025, he teaches at Paatsaali School in Sanikiluaq, Nunavut.

McKay became one of the first recognized literary writers to embrace social media. During the 2010 CBC Canada Reads competition, McKay used Facebook, Twitter, and especially YouTube, to promote his 2003 novel Twenty-Six as one of the Best Canadian Novels of the previous decade. He used hand-shot, self-produced videos called "Twenty-six Reasons Why You Should Vote for Twenty-Six For Canada Reads 2010". The novel made the 40 book long list, and that success spurred McKay to further use of social media as a promotional tool.

In the spring of 2012, McKay used an online funding site, Indiegogo.com, to fund the independent publication of a new novel, Roll Up the Rim. That campaign raised $10,000 in 30 days, and was chosen by Indiegogo.com as an example of how to run a successful online funding campaign.

== Recognition ==
McKay's debut short story collection, Like This, was short-listed for the Giller Prize in 1995 and received the Dartmouth Book Award for fiction in 1996.

His first novel, Twenty-Six, was published in 2003. It became a national bestseller, and won the 2004 Dartmouth Book Award.

What Comes Echoing Back was longlisted for CBC's 2024 Canada Reads.

== Published works ==
- Like This (1996)
- Twenty-Six (2003)
- Roll up the Rim (2013)
- What Comes Echoing Back (2023)
