= Samson (locomotive) =

English-built railroad steam locomotive

Coordinates: 45°34′04.1″N 62°39′27.2″W

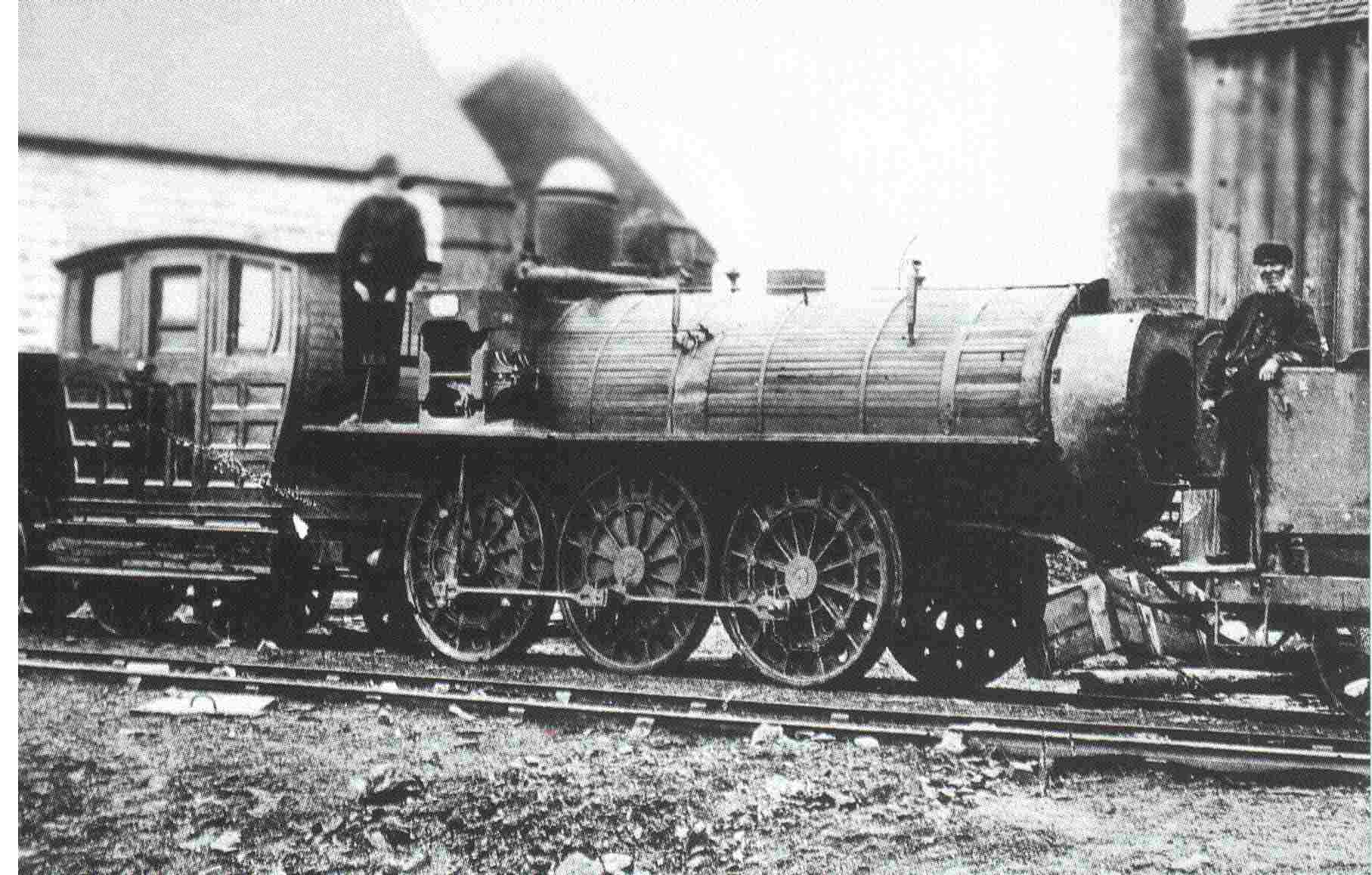
- Samson with its coal tender and passenger coach, The Nova Scotia Pioneer, circa 1880
Type and origin
- Power type: Steam
- Builder: Timothy Hackworth, Shildon, England
- Build date: 1838
Specifications
- Configuration
  - Whyte: 0-6-0 vertical cylinder
- Gauge: 4 ft 8 1/2 in (1,435 mm)
- Driver dia.: 4 ft (1.2 m)
- Loco weight: 18 short tons (16 t)
- Boiler: 540 US gallons (2,000 L; 450 imp gal) capacity
- Cylinder size: 15 in (380 mm) bore and 16 1/2 in (420 mm) stroke
Performance figures
- Maximum speed: 8 mph (13 km/h)
Career
- Operators: Albion Mines Railway (1839-1893)
- Official name: Samson
- Delivered: May 1839
- First run: December 1838
- Retired: 1885
- Restored: 1893
- Current owner: Nova Scotia Museum of Industry, part of the Nova Scotia Museum
- Disposition: Static display at the Nova Scotia Museum of Industry in Stellarton, Nova Scotia

The Samson is an English-built railroad steam locomotive made in 1838 that ran on the Albion Mines Railway in Nova Scotia, Canada. It is preserved at the Nova Scotia Museum of Industry in Stellarton, Nova Scotia and is the oldest locomotive in Canada.

== Construction ==
The locomotive was built in 1838 by Timothy Hackworth at his Soho Works in Shildon, England. Samson represents an early design of steam locomotive with a return-flue boiler. The fireman and engineer worked separately on open platforms at either end of the locomotive. It was commissioned for the General Mining Association along with two other locomotives, Hercules and John Buddle, for the Albion Mines Railway to serve mines in Pictou County, Nova Scotia.

== Arrival ==
The locomotives arrived unassembled aboard the brig Ythan in May 1839. Two engineers arrived with the locomotives (the Samson, the John Buddle and the Hercules), including George Davidson, who helped build the locomotives in England and would settle in Nova Scotia to work with Samson for the rest of his career. Also accompanying the locomotives on the journey was John Brown Stubbs (Stobbs), Hackworth's master mechanic. Stubbs and Hackworth worked together for George Stevenson until Hackworth opened his own firm and Stubbs accompanied him. He too helped design and build the Samson, John Buddle and the Hercules. The three steam engines (dismantled) were shipped along with the rails. Stubbs was responsible for the supervision of the tracks, the turntable at the end of the mine as well as rebuilding of the Samson. The tracks were laid on a bed built under the supervision of surveyor Peter Crerar. When the job was complete, Stubbs returned to Hackworth's employ in England. The new railway officially opened with a large celebration on 19 September 1839, although the tracks were not completed to the coal pier until May 1840.

== Career ==
Samson served from 1839 to 1867 carrying coal on the six-mile line from the mines around Stellarton and New Glasgow to the East River loading pier. It proved a strong and reliable locomotive, considered "slow but of great power" by railway workers of the day. One former engineer recalled how it moved a heavy string of coal cars from a crooked siding on a wet day when a more modern locomotive failed to move them. In addition to its regular duties moving coal cars, Samson also saw service carrying passengers in an early design of a passenger coach. The locomotive was semi-retired in 1867 but continued to operate when necessary until 1885. It was sent to Chicago to the National Exhibition of Railway Appliances in 1883.

== Preservation ==
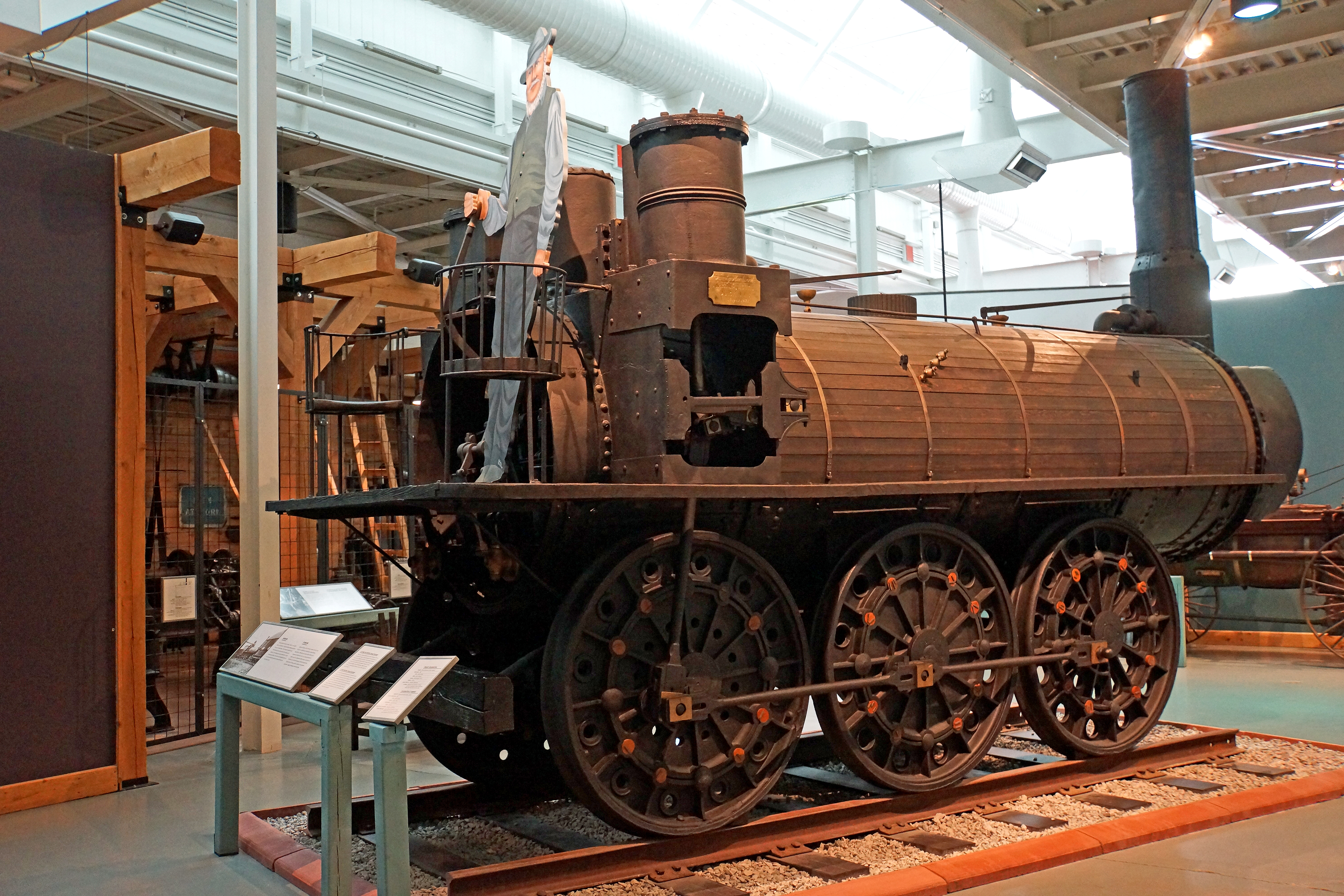
Samson preserved at the Nova Scotia Museum of Industry

Samson was stored for scrap until 1893 when it was displayed at the Chicago World's Fair as an antique, and acquired along with one of its passenger coaches by the Baltimore and Ohio Railroad where it was preserved. It was returned to Nova Scotia in 1927. The passenger coach stayed behind and put on display at the B&O Railroad Museum. Samson was displayed beside the Halifax train station until 1950 when the locomotive was moved to New Glasgow. Today it is displayed in the Age of Steam Gallery at the Nova Scotia Museum of Industry in Stellarton, part of the Nova Scotia Museum system where it is restored to its appearance at the end of its working life.

A careful survey of the structure of the locomotive before restoration found it remarkably well preserved, retaining 90% of its end-of-service parts. Examination of the parts shows various repairs and evolutionary modifications that were added to the original Hackworth assembly by the shops of the Albion Mines Railway during the locomotive's long working career. A small number of parts such as the steel tires were added by the B&O Railroad Museum after the locomotive retired.

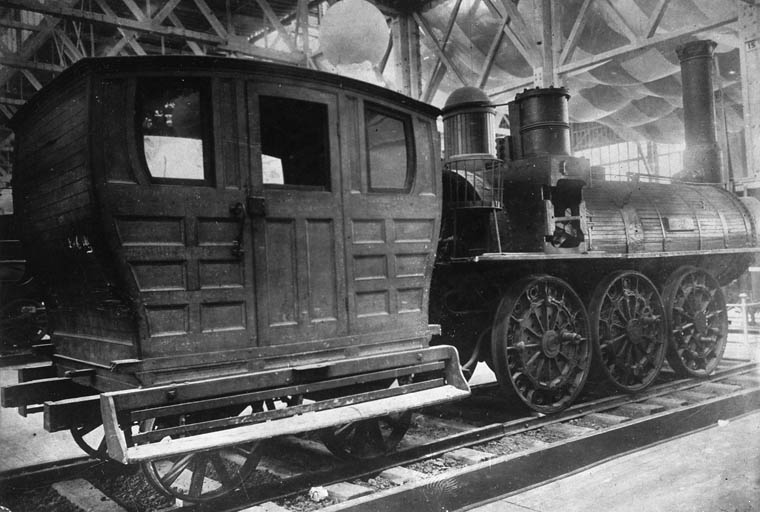
Earlier storage or display. 1920-1939

== Historical significance ==
Samson was the first locomotive in Canada to run on iron rails. It is the oldest surviving locomotive in Canada, one of the oldest in North America and one of only four surviving locomotives designed by engineer Timothy Hackworth (the others being Bradyll, Derwent and Sans Pareil).

== See also ==
- John Bull (locomotive)
- LMR 57 Lion
- Stourbridge Lion
- Timothy Hackworth
