= Pat Dunn (politician) =

Canadian politician

The Honourable Pat Dunn ECNS
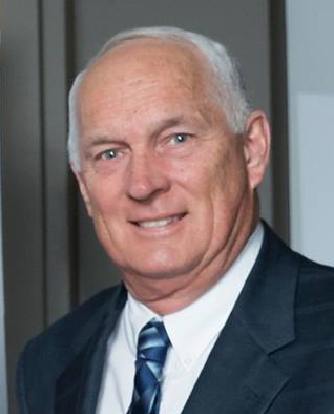

Member of the Nova Scotia House of Assembly for Pictou Centre
- In office October 8, 2013 – October 27, 2024
- Preceded by: Ross Landry
- Succeeded by: Danny MacGillivray
- In office June 29, 2006 – June 19, 2009
- Preceded by: John Hamm
- Succeeded by: Ross Landry

Personal details
- Born: February 10, 1950 (age 76) Trenton, Nova Scotia
- Party: Progressive Conservative
- Occupation: School Principal

Pat Dunn (born February 10, 1950) is a Canadian politician. He represented the electoral district of Pictou Centre in the Nova Scotia House of Assembly from 2006 to 2009, and from 2013 to 2024, as a member of the Progressive Conservatives. He served as Minister of Health Promotion and Protection in the Executive Council of Nova Scotia.

He was defeated by Ross Landry of the New Democrats in the 2009 election, but was reelected in the 2013 election.

On August 31, 2021, Dunn was named Minister of Communities, Cultures, Tourism, and Heritage, as well as Minister of the Voluntary Sector and African Nova Scotian Affairs. Dunn represents one of the largest communities of African Nova Scotians outside Halifax.

On September 13, 2023, Dunn announced he would not run in the 2024 Nova Scotia general election, and was shuffled out of cabinet the following day.

== Career ==
Dunn was born in Trenton in 1950. He is a graduate of Saint Francis Xavier University with degrees in Arts and Education. Before working as a teacher and an educator, he worked at a Michelin factory in Granton, Nova Scotia and for a number of local businesses. He is currently married to his wife Patsy and they have six children.

== Electoral record ==
2017 Nova Scotia general election
Party	Candidate	Votes	%	±%
Progressive Conservative	Pat Dunn	3,773	52.43	+0.17
Liberal	Jeff Davis	2,027	28.17	+10.34
New Democratic	Henderson Paris	1,396	19.40	-10.51
Total valid votes		7,196	100.00	
Total rejected ballots		28	0.39	-0.41
Turnout		7,224	55.86	-5.48
Eligible voters		12,932		
Progressive Conservative hold		Swing		-5.08

2013 Nova Scotia general election
Party	Candidate	Votes	%	±%
Progressive Conservative	Pat Dunn	4147	52.26	
New Democratic Party	Ross Landry	2373	29.91	
Liberal	Bill Muirhead	1415	17.83	

2009 Nova Scotia general election
Party	Candidate	Votes	%	±%
New Democratic Party	Ross Landry	3650	46.30	
Progressive Conservative	Pat Dunn	3519	44.64	
Liberal	Neil MacIsaac	567	7.19	
Green	Jim Lindsey	147	1.86	–

2006 Nova Scotia general election
Party	Candidate	Votes	%	±%
Progressive Conservative	Pat Dunn	3901	52.60	
New Democratic Party	Danny MacGillivray	2344	31.61	
Liberal	Troy MacCulloch	1057	14.25	
Green	Samuel M. Clark	93	1.25	–
Independent	Dennis Tate	20	0.27	
