= Bradyll (locomotive) =

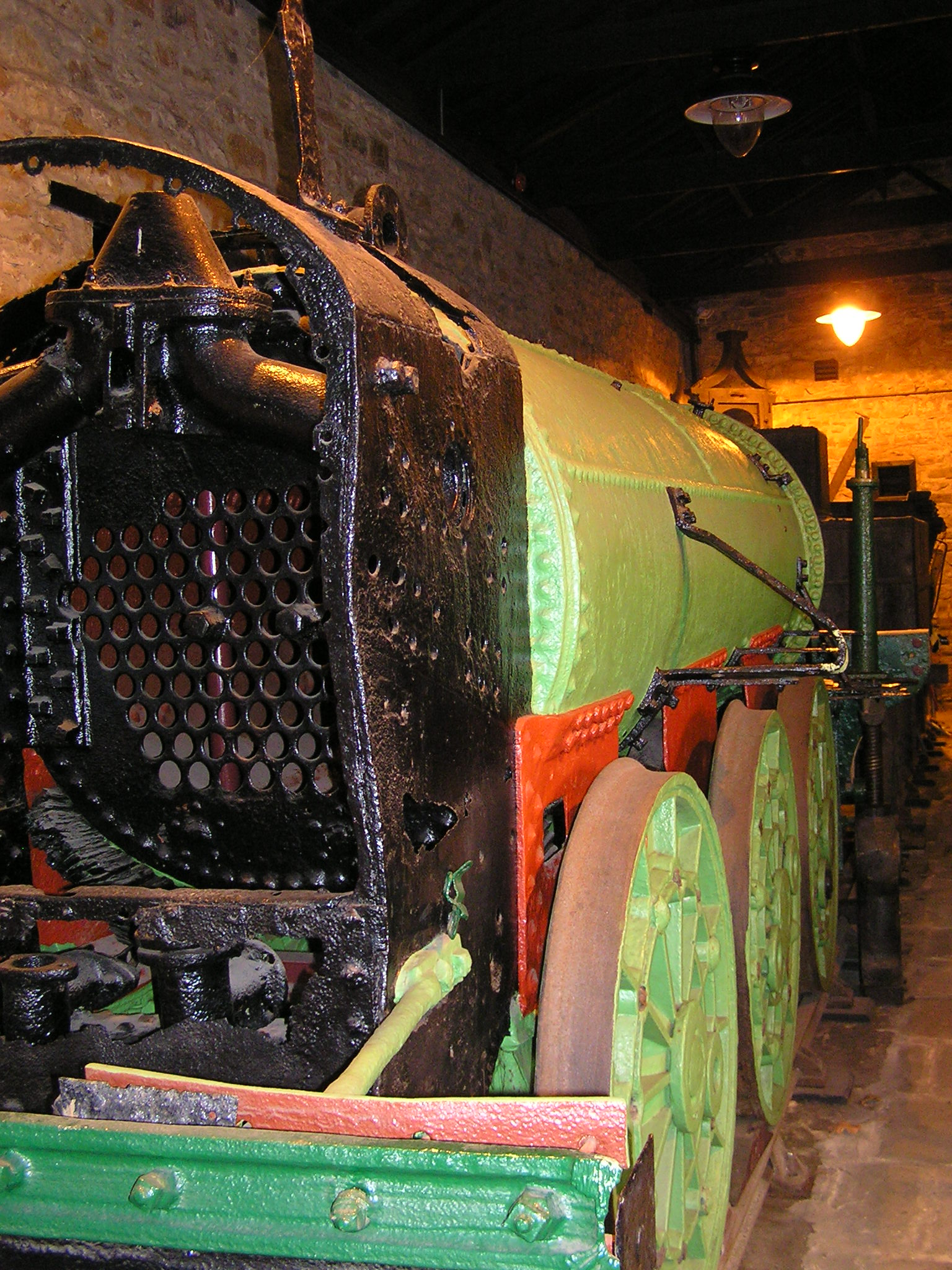
- Bradyll preserved at Darlington Railway Museum.
Type and origin
- Power type: Steam
- Builder: Timothy Hackworth
- Build date: 1840
Specifications
- Configuration
  - Whyte: 0-6-0
- Gauge: 1,435 mm (4 ft 8 1/2 in) standard gauge
Career
- Operators: Hetton colliery railway
- Retired: 1875
- Current owner: National Railway Museum, Shildon
- Disposition: Static display

Bradyll is an early steam locomotive built by Timothy Hackworth at his Soho Works in Shildon, England in 1840. Built in 1840, it is one of the oldest surviving locomotives with an 0-6-0 wheel arrangement. Only the 1838-built Samson (another Hackworth engine) is older.

== History ==
Bradyll was built to work on the South Hetton Railway, which ran from Haswell to Seaham Harbour. It was named after Colonel Thomas Bradyll, who owned the mines and promoted the railway and new port built at Seaham.

== Survival ==
Bradyll was obsolete by the 1870s, and in 1875 was converted into a snowplough. This was done by removing the cylinders and motion, and adding a blade and weights. By World War Two, it had been withdrawn from this duty, but avoided scrapping as it was on an isolated piece of track.

After the war, Bradyll was placed at the works gates to the Philadelphia Iron Works as a "gate guardian" and regularly painted with a tar-based paint, which helped to preserve it. The locomotive was kept in the 'Council yard' at Burke Street, Shildon during the early 1970s prior to being moved into the display sheds when they opened the Timothy Hackworth Museum. It was painted black at that time. Bradyll has never been restored, and is probably unique in this respect. The locomotive has an Adamson type firebox, and Wilson wheels, as used by Hackworth on the Stockton and Darlington Railway.

Bradyll is currently on display at Locomotion, Shildon. Despite being conserved, no restoration is planned to return it to an "as-built" appearance.

== Dispute over identity ==
Recent research by Dr. Michael Bailey has raised doubt over the engine's true identity. Bailey believes the engine on display in Shildon is not Bradyll, but rather Nelson, a locomotive built c. 1840 by Thomas Richardson of Hartlepool for the South Hetton Colliery. The December 1919 issue of the Locomotive Magazine states that the locomotive at the time bore plates identifying it as Nelson No.2.
