= Nova Scotia Museum of Industry =

- Established: 1986
- Location: 147 North Foord Street, Stellarton, Nova Scotia
- Coordinates: 45°34′06.6″N 62°39′35.8″W
- Type: Industry museum
- Manager: Claire MacDonald-Matthews
- Curators: Erika Wilson (Collections); Andrew Phillips (Education and Public Programming)
- Website: museumofindustry.novascotia.ca

The Nova Scotia Museum of Industry is a provincial museum located in Stellarton, Nova Scotia, dedicated to the story of Nova Scotia work and workers. Part of the Nova Scotia Museum system, the museum aims to explain how Nova Scotia was affected by the opportunities and challenges of the Industrial Age.

The museum began with a series of studies on ways to preserve Nova Scotia's industrial heritage beginning in 1974. A curator was hired and the collection was started in 1986. The Museum building (80,000 square feet) was designed by Halifax architects Fowler, Bauld and Mitchell and was completed in 1990 and the museum opened to the public in 1995. The museum occupies a site beside the Trans Canada Highway which includes some of the oldest industrial sites in Nova Scotia including the Foord Pit, once the deepest coal mine in the world and the Albion Railway, the first passenger and freight railway in Canada.

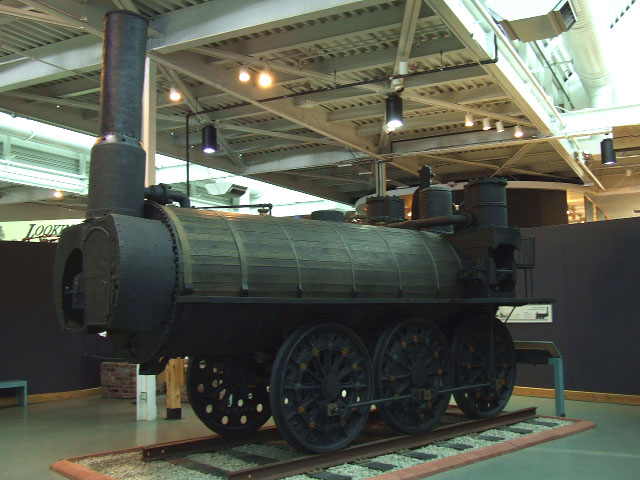
The Samson locomotive

The collection comprises more than 30,000 objects. Notable artifacts include the Albion Railway's Samson locomotive, the oldest railway locomotive in Canada and the Victorian, a horseless carriage, the first gasoline powered car built in the Maritimes. The museum has extensive interactive galleries that explore the evolution of industry and work in Nova Scotia. Highlights include a large exhibit on coal mining in Nova Scotia including a special display on the Westray Mine disaster which took place near the museum, on May 9, 1992.
