= General Mining Association =

Nova Scotia mining monopoly

- Industry: Mining
- Founded: 1827
- Defunct: 1900
- Headquarters: London, United Kingdom

The General Mining Association was a London coal mining company operating in Nova Scotia. It was formed by Rundell & Bridge in 1827. It held a mining monopoly in Nova Scotia until 1858.

== History ==
In 1788, King George III had drafted a lease in favor of his son the Duke of York for mineral rights in Nova Scotia. By 1825 the Duke of York had a significant debt to the London jewelers Rundell and Bridge. After sponsoring a mineral survey in Nova Scotia and finding a great amount of coal, an agreement was made where the lease was modified to include coal and that the lease be transferred to the newly formed General Mining Association, created by Rundell and Bridge, with the Duke entitled to 25% of the profit.This amended lease was granted in 1825 by King George IV for a period of 60 years.

A representative of the General Mining Association arrived in Pictou in the early summer of 1827, and in June a vessel with skilled workers and machinery arrived, beginning work at Albion Mines. In December a 20 horse power steam engine started operation, the first in the province.

In 1839 the G.M.A. commissioned the Samson, which was the first locomotive in Canada to run on iron rails.

Popular resentment in Nova Scotia on the G.M.A's monopoly over coal increased throughout the early 19th century. In 1857 the Nova Scotia Assembly authorized two of its members to travel to London and negotiate with the G.M.A. An agreement was made and ratified the following year, ending the monopoly. The G.M.A. was allowed the right to mine coal in 34 square miles in Cape Breton, four square miles in Pictou County, and four square miles each at Springhill and Joggins in Cumberland County. All remaining mines and minerals passed to the Nova Scotia government.

In 1871 the Joggins location was sold, and the following year the Springhill location was sold and the Pictou location was transferred to the Halifax Company.

The Nova Scotia Steel and Coal Co. purchased the remaining mines and mining rights at Sydney Mines in Cape Breton in 1900.
