= Stellarton =

Stellarton Gaelic: Méinnean Na h-Albann (Albion Mines in english)
- Town
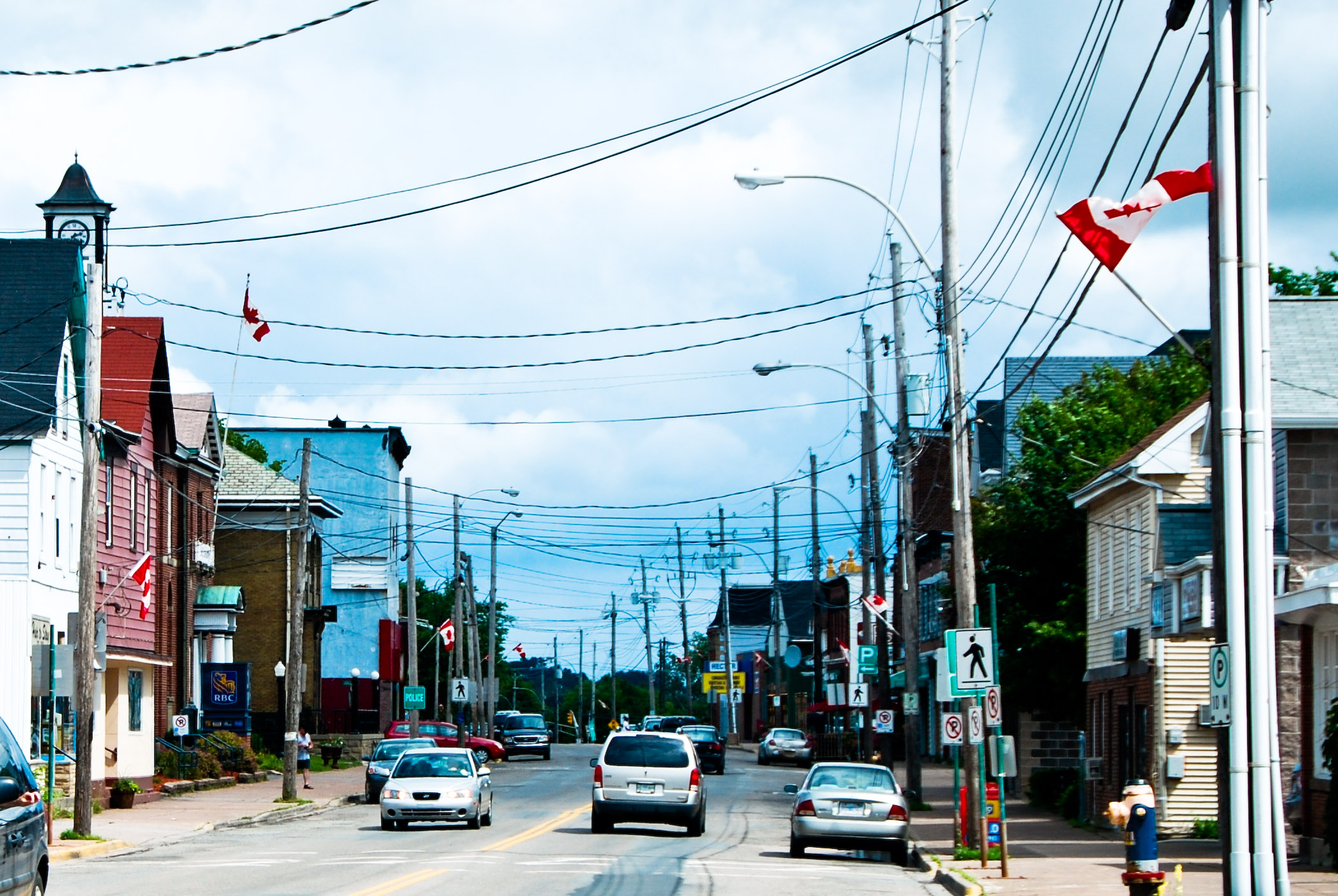
- Foord Street in July 2009

- Flag
- Nickname: Stelly
- Motto: "Spirit, People, Pride"
- Location of Stellarton in Nova Scotia
- Coordinates: 45°33′24″N 62°39′36″W
- Country: Canada
- Province: Nova Scotia
- Municipality: Pictou County
- Founded: 1790s
- Incorporated: October 22, 1889

Government
  - Mayor: Darren Stroud
  - Governing body: Stellarton Town Council
  - MLA: Danny MacGillivray (PC)
  - MP: Sean Fraser (L)

Area (2021)
  - Total: 8.99 km^{2} (3.47 sq mi)
- Highest elevation: 65 m (213 ft)
- Lowest elevation: 19 m (62 ft)

Population (2021)
  - Total: 4,007
  - Density: 445.6/km^{2} (1,154/sq mi)
- Demonym: Stellartonian
- Time zone: UTC-4 (AST)
  - Summer (DST): UTC-3 (ADT)
- Postal Code: B0K 1S0
- Area code: 902
- Telephone Exchanges: 301, 331, 419, 507, 513, 600, 601, 616, 695, 752, 753, 754, 755, 759, 771, 921, 928, 931, 934, 952, 967
- Website: www.stellarton.ca

Stellarton (Scottish Gaelic: Meinnean na h-Albann) is a town in the province of Nova Scotia, Canada. It is adjacent and to the south of the larger town of New Glasgow. In pioneer times the area was called Coal Mines Station, and from 1833 until 1889, it was known as Albion Mines. The town was incorporated as Stellarton in 1889 and owes its name to a specific type of torbanite which came to be known as "stellarite" because of the "stars of fire" given off by its sparky flame.

== History ==
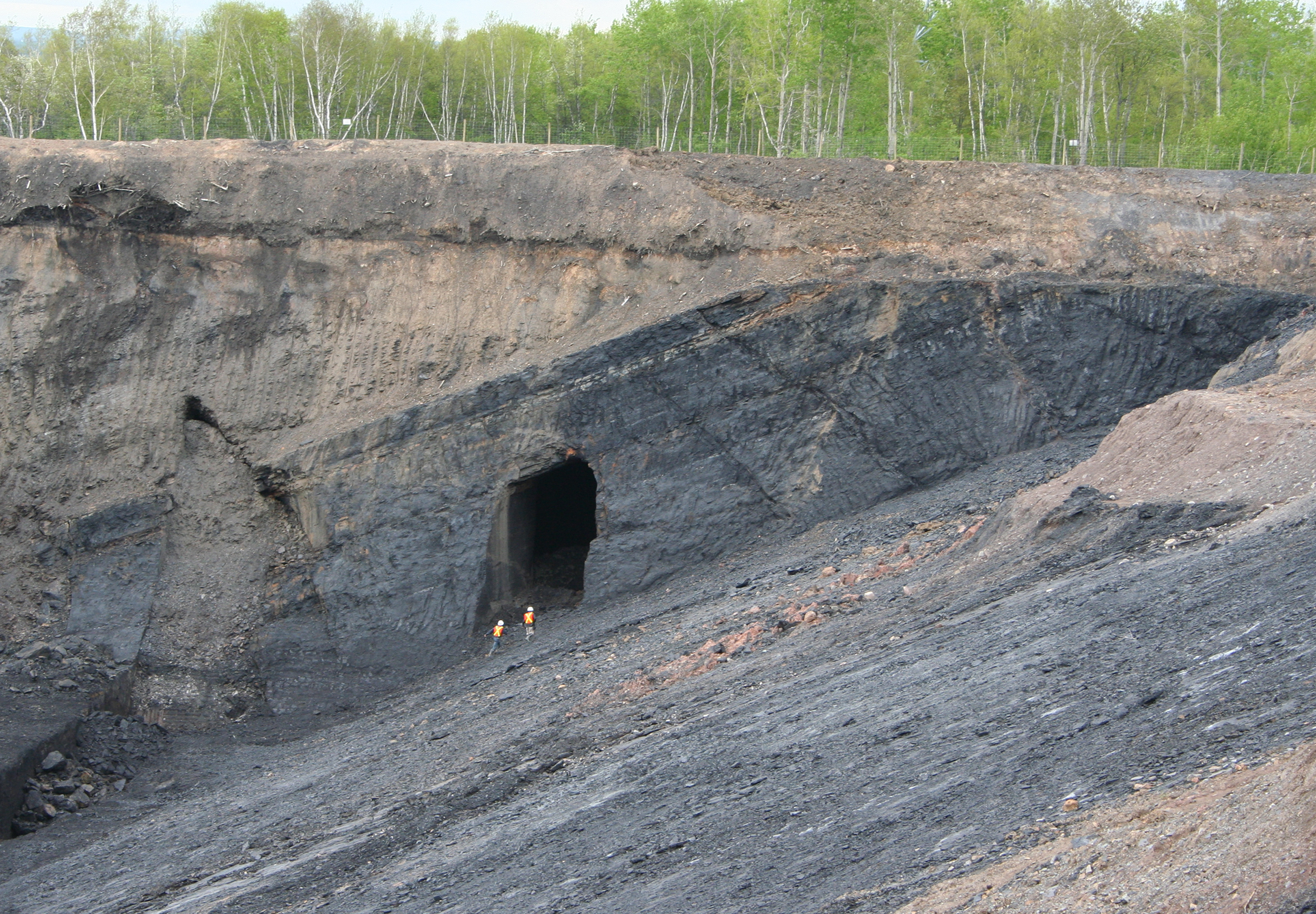
Foord Coal Seam

In the 1790s, coal quickly became a key focus of the local economy. The Foord coal seam (from which the main street of Stellarton derives its name) runs through most of the town and is part of the greater Stellarton Basin/Pictou Coalfield. As part of an area recognized by geologists for its unique oil shales and thick coal seams, with estimate of coal seams being as thick as 48 feet (15 m).

In the 1820s, the mines were taken over by the General Mining Association, which intensified production with new technology, including the first steam engine in Nova Scotia for pumping and in 1839 Samson, the oldest railway locomotive in Canada which carried coal to waiting ships.

Samson is now preserved at the Nova Scotia Museum of Industry in Stellarton.

== Demographics ==
Historical population
Year	Pop.	±%
1871	1,750	—
1881	1,599	−8.6%
1891	2,410	+50.7%
1901	2,335	−3.1%
1911	3,910	+67.5%
1921	5,312	+35.9%
1931	5,002	−5.8%
1941	5,351	+7.0%
1951	5,575	+4.2%
1956	5,445	−2.3%
1961	5,327	−2.2%
1981	5,433	+2.0%
1986	5,259	−3.2%
1991	5,237	−0.4%
1996	4,968	−5.1%
2001	4,809	−3.2%
2006	4,717	−1.9%
2011	4,485	−4.9%
2016	4,208	−6.2%
2021	4,007	−4.8%

In the 2021 Census of Population conducted by Statistics Canada, Stellarton had a population of 4,007 living in 1,881 of its 2,017 total private dwellings, a change of −4.8% from its 2016 population of 4,208. With a land area of 8.99 km^{2} (3.47 sq mi), it had a population density of 445.7/km^{2} (1,154.4/sq mi) in 2021.

== Major businesses ==
The town is still home to coal mining operations. The Stellarton Surface Coal Mine has been operated by Pioneer Coal since 1980.

The Canadian grocery chain Sobeys is based out of Stellarton, and its corporate offices and grocery subsidiaries provides a fair percentage of the town's employment. Sobeys subsidiaries based in Stellarton include Big 8 Beverages, TRA Cash and Carry, Eastern Sign-Print and Regional Distribution Centre.

A former local business was the Clairtone factory, founded by Peter Munk and David Gilmour with the encouragement of local businessman and politician Frank H. Sobey.

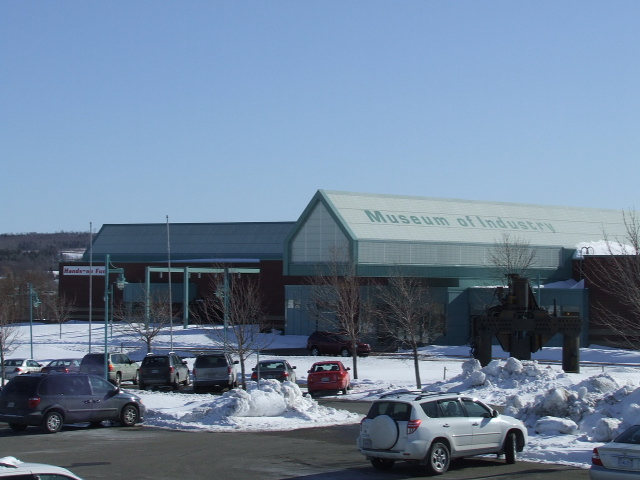
The Nova Scotia Museum of Industry in Stellarton

== Attractions ==
Stellarton is home to the Nova Scotia Museum of Industry, part of the Nova Scotia Museum system. Stellarton is noted for its painted fire hydrants, each adorned with a costumed representative of a town inhabitant or profession.

=== Stellarton Memorial Ice Rink ===
The Stellarton Memorial Ice Rink was constructed in 1945 to remember the soldiers that died in World War I and World War II. It is still standing today but has not been used for several years.

== Notable people ==
- James Peter Robertson (1883–1917), recipient of the Victoria Cross
- Leo McKay Jr. (born 1964), novelist
- Blayre Turnbull (born 1993), Olympic gold and silver medalist in ice hockey, forward and captain for the Toronto Sceptres, and member of the Canada women's national ice hockey team

== See also ==
- Sobey family
- List of municipalities in Nova Scotia
