= Trenton, Nova Scotia =

Trenton
- Town
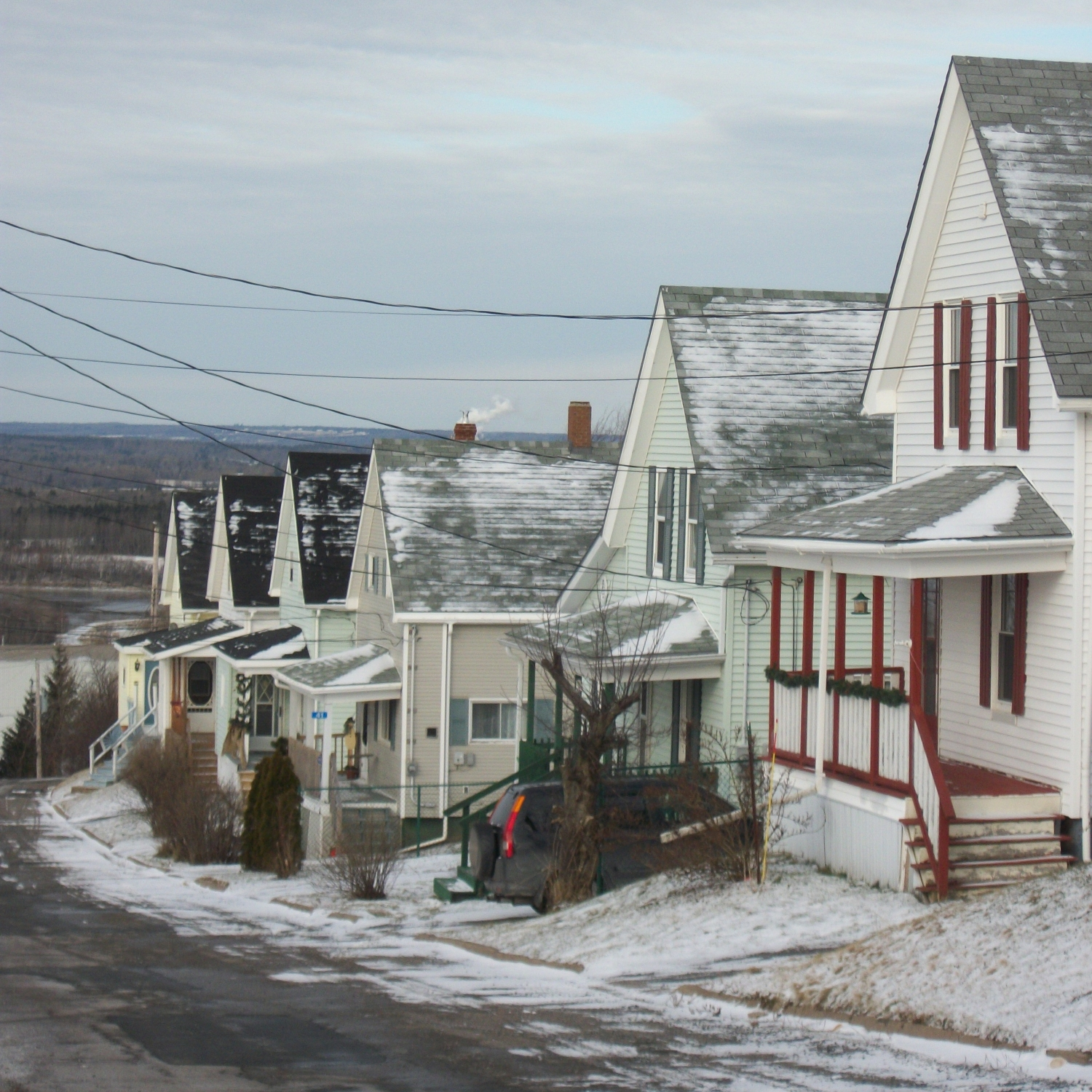

- Seal
- Motto: "Strike while the iron is hot"
- Trenton in Nova Scotia
- Coordinates: 45°37′9.48″N 62°37′59.52″W
- Country: Canada
- Province: Nova Scotia
- Municipality: Pictou County
- Founded: 1786
- Incorporated: March 18, 1911

Government
  - Governing Body: Trenton Town Council
  - Mayor: Alec Dove
  - MLA: Pat Dunn (PC)
  - MP: Sean Fraser (L)

Area (2021)
  - Total: 6.07 km^{2} (2.34 sq mi)
- Elevation: 92 m (302 ft)

Population (2021)
  - Total: 2,407
  - Density: 396.7/km^{2} (1,027/sq mi)
- Time zone: UTC-4 (AST)
  - Summer (DST): UTC-3 (ADT)
- Postal Code: B0K 1X0
- Area code: 902
- Telephone Exchanges: 301, 331, 419, 507, 616, 695, 752, 753, 754, 755, 759, 771, 921, 928, 931, 934, 952
- Website: www.town.trenton.ns.ca

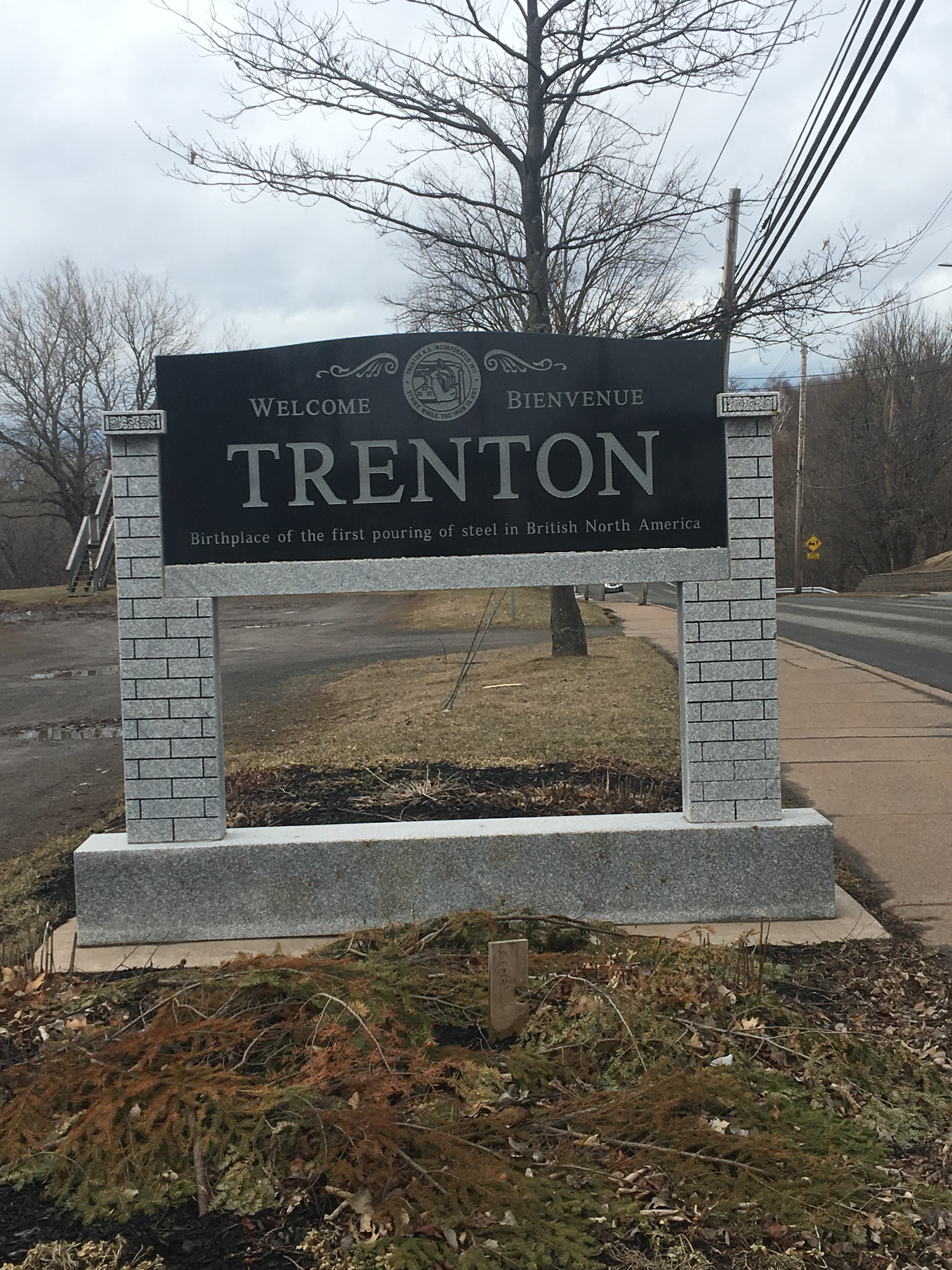

Trenton (Scottish Gaelic: Baile na Stàilinn) is a town located in Pictou County, Nova Scotia, Canada. Founded in 1786, it is situated on the east bank of the East River of Pictou. The community gained its name in 1882 at the suggestion of a prominent citizen, Harvey Graham, after he visited Trenton, New Jersey. It was incorporated as a town on 11 March 1911.

== Economy ==
Since the 1870s, the town's economy was tied to the TrentonWorks factory and its predecessors which occupies a large property along the East River of Pictou. This factory closed permanently in 2016 after various incarnations as a steel fabrication, railcar fabrication, and wind turbine tower fabrication facility. Since the late 1960s, the town has also been host to the Trenton Generating Station. Other large employers in the past have included a paint manufacturer (Tibbett's Paints) as well as a glass works (Trenton Glass).

The town's economy is undergoing a transition to a post-industrial tertiary/service economy. Major employers in the region are located outside the town, namely a Michelin Tire factory in Granton and an Asia Pulp & Paper (Paper Excellence Canada) pulp mill in Abercrombie.

The TrentonWorks facility dominates the town's waterfront, having opened in the 1870s as Canada's first steel mill before being converted to focus exclusively on manufactured steel products by the late 19th century. The TrentonWorks site was used to produce railway cars throughout the entire 20th century before production ceased in 2007. Part of the facility was used as a shipyard to produce small cargo ships during both World Wars; the railcar plant was temporarily retooled during these conflicts to produce munitions. As of 2010, the facility is undergoing a $60 million conversion to produce components for wind turbines in a partnership between South Korean industrial conglomerate Daewoo Shipbuilding & Marine Engineering (DSME) and the governments of Nova Scotia and Canada. The end of railcar manufacturing on the TrentonWorks site saw the loss of 1300 jobs (at peak employment); it is currently hoped that the conversion to produce wind turbine components by DSME will return employment to pre-2007 levels.

Trenton Forge is a separate company located adjacent to the TrentonWorks property dates to the 1870s and operates one of the largest forges in the world. At one time, Trenton also hosted a glass works and paint factory.

The town has been facing significant economic turmoil in recent decades as the local economy transitions from industrial to post-industrial. Rural depopulation in Canada has affected Pictou County and Trenton has witnessed the loss of numerous institutions and businesses over the years. These include: 5 schools, a movie theatre, doctors' offices, many businesses, and several industries. The town has very few local services, relying on the growing commercial district in neighbouring New Glasgow; it has recently seen its last bank branch and gas station close.

With the town's residential and commercial tax base in decline, finances are strained for maintaining existing services and it is believed that amalgamation with New Glasgow is inevitable.

== Trenton Steeltown Centennial Park ==
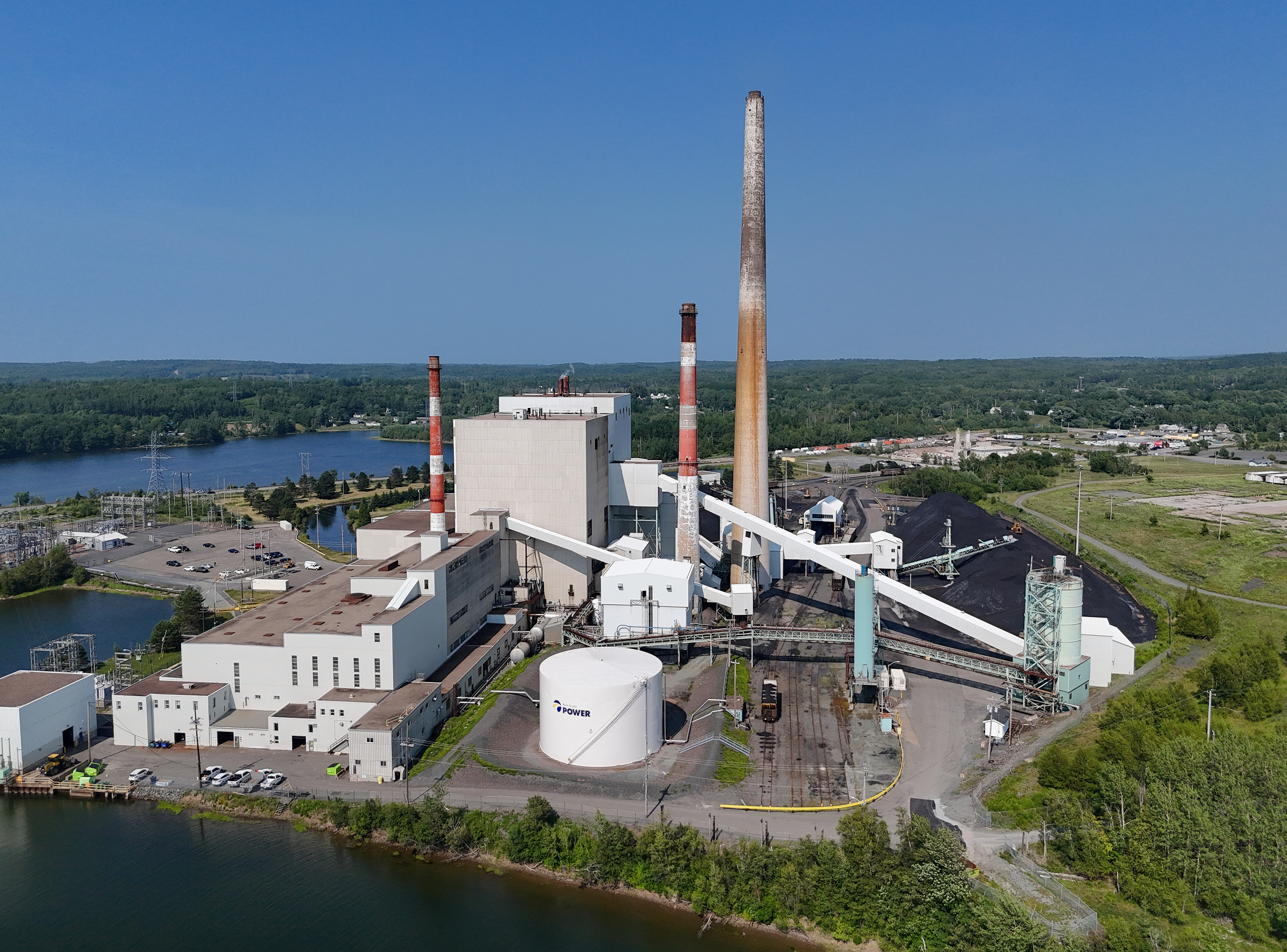
Trenton Generating Station

A park located on the north-east edge of Trenton, the Trenton Steeltown Centennial Park is a popular site attraction. The Centennial Park offers a variety of walking trails within the 560 acre environment therefore, making the park the largest public green space in Pictou County. Trenton Park offers other attractions including an outdoor swimming pool, amphitheater, and summer time canteen for refreshments. A picnic area located in Trenton park provides visitors a space to stop and enjoy food while enjoying the landscape.

== Trenton Airport ==
The airport is located at 174 Duke Street. The airport offers accommodations year round and is open to public transportation upon request. Since the opening of Trenton Airport a variety of recognizable people have used the facility which include: Queen Elizabeth and Prince Philip, Prince Charles and Camilla, Duchess of Cornwall, Babe Ruth, Bill Clinton, along with numerous Canadian prime ministers and politicians.

== Education ==
Trenton has two public schools. Trenton Elementary School is located at 1 Sixth Street, offering grades primary through four. Trenton Middle School is located at 6 Dickie Street and occupying grades five through eight. Recently, the Chignecto-Central Regional School Board received approval from the province to add an additional pre-primary site for Trenton Elementary School. This allows the children of Trenton to benefit from the program, with more educational opportunities.

== Demographics ==
In the 2021 Census of Population conducted by Statistics Canada, Trenton had a population of 2,407 living in 1,091 of its 1,167 total private dwellings, a change of −2.7% from its 2016 population of 2,474. With a land area of 6.07 km^{2} (2.34 sq mi), it had a population density of 396.5/km^{2} (1,027.0/sq mi) in 2021.

== See also ==
- List of municipalities in Nova Scotia
