= Melville, Pictou County, Nova Scotia =

Melville
- Community
- Location of Melville, Nova Scotia
- Coordinates: 45°47′20″N 63°1′40″W
- Country: Canada
- Province: Nova Scotia
- County: Pictou County
- Municipality: Municipality of Pictou County
- District: 4

Government
  - Councillor, District 4: Ronald Baillie
  - MLA, Pictou West: Vacant
  - MP, Central Nova: Sean Fraser
- Highest elevation: 20 m (66 ft)
- Lowest elevation: 0 m (0 ft)
- Time zone: UTC-4 (AST)
  - Summer (DST): UTC-3 (ADT)
- Canadian Postal Code: B0K 1N0
- Area code and exchange: (902) 351-xxxx
- Website: riverjohn.com

Melville is an unincorporated community in the Canadian province of Nova Scotia, located in Pictou County. It is on Nova Scotia Trunk 6 between the communities of River John, Cape John and Toney River. It is a rural area on the Northumberland Strait to the east of Cape John. The nearest village is River John, some 5 km south, and it is there that postal, telephone and fire services are located. The nearest town is Pictou some 29 km to the east.

There is a small harbour at Skinners Cove, comprising short breakwaters and wharves either side of a narrow channel. It is used mainly by the fishing industry and a few recreational boats. Recent improvements to the harbour were funded by the Government of Canada.
