= Seafoam, Nova Scotia =

Seafoam
- Location of Seafoam, Nova Scotia
- Coordinates: 45°46′56.5″N 62°58′28.2″W
- Country: Canada
- Province: Nova Scotia
- County: Pictou County
- Municipality: Municipality of Pictou County
- District: 4

Government
  - Councillor, District 4: Ronald Baillie
  - MLA, Pictou West: Marco MacLeod
  - MP, Central Nova: Sean Fraser
- Highest elevation: 20 m (66 ft)
- Lowest elevation: 0 m (0 ft)
- Time zone: UTC-4 (AST)
  - Summer (DST): UTC-3 (ADT)
- Canadian Postal Code: B0K 1N0
- Area code and exchange: (902) 351-xxxx
- Website: riverjohn.com

Seafoam is an unincorporated community in the Canadian province of Nova Scotia, located in Pictou County. It is on Nova Scotia Trunk 6 between the communities of Melville and Toney River. It is a rural area on the Northumberland Strait to the east of Cape John. The nearest village is River John, some 8 km southwest, and postal, telephone and fire services are provided from there. The nearest town is Pictou some 23 km to the east.

There are two alternative sources for the origins of the name. One is that it comes from the name of a schooner that was wrecked here. The other is that it describes the state of the shore during a storm.

Most work in the past has been from farming, fishing and forestry. There were once two wharves at Seafoam, both with lobster canneries. Neither are being worked today. One at MacDonalds Cove is now derelict and the other was 3 km to the east at Baillies Cove. In the early 1900s a quarry was exporting stone by sea.

A school was built here in approximately 1900. The first building burnt down in 1926 and was replaced by a nearby hall which served as the school until 1968. The building is now the Melville-Seafoam Community Hall.
