= Young Teazer =

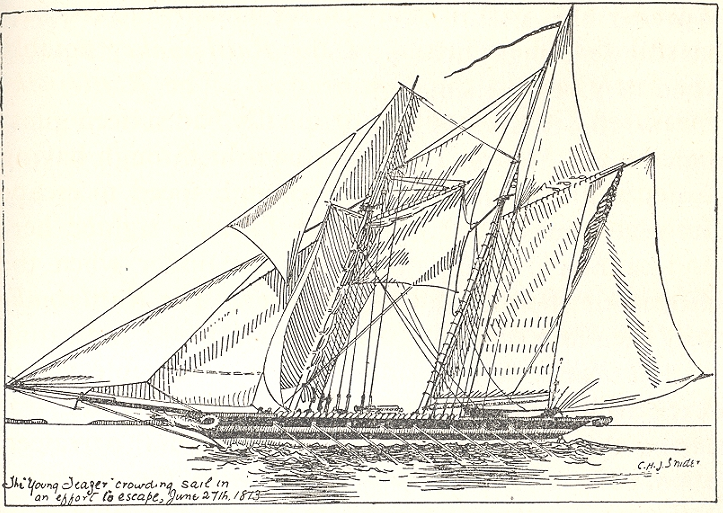
- Young Teazer

History

United States
- Name: Young Teazer
- Owner: Samuel Adams
- Launched: 1813
- Commissioned: 3 May 1813
- Home port: New York City
- Fate: Destroyed in explosion 27 June 1813 after HMS Hogue and HMS Orpheus trapped her

General characteristics
- Type: Privateer
- Tons burthen: 120 or 124
- Length: 60 ft (18 m) (overall)
- Sail plan: Schooner
- Complement: 65, or 73
- Armament: 5 guns plus 3 wooden dummy guns
- Notes: Source for info box dimensions

Young Teazer was a United States privateer schooner that captured 12 British vessels, five of which made it to American ports. A member of her crew blew her up at Mahone Bay, Nova Scotia during the War of 1812 after a series of British warships chased her and after HMS Hogue trapped her. The schooner became famous for this deadly explosion, which killed most of her crew, and for the folklore about the ghostly "Teazer Light."

== Historical context ==
Many American privateers attacked British shipping off the coast of Nova Scotia during the War of 1812, which forced the British to deploy warships to patrol North American waters to forestall attacks and capture the American raiders. The Royal Navy tried to protect British merchant shipping to and from Halifax, Nova Scotia and the West Indies while enforcing a blockade of major American ports aimed at restricting American trade. Both sides used privateers in the War of 1812, but the United States made greater use of them. The Americans used hit-and-run tactics to capture prizes, generally engaging Royal Navy vessels only under favorable circumstances.

Young Teazer's predecessor was the American schooner Teazer, one of the first privateers to put to sea when the United States declared war. HMS San Domingo captured Teazer in December 1812 and burned her at sea. Her crew were released on parole, promising not to serve against the British until they had been exchanged for British prisoners of war. Teazer's owner Samuel Adams of New York had the schooner Young Teazer built as a replacement.

== Engagement ==
Young Teazer had an initial successful cruise. In May 1813, she captured the British prize Invincible Napoleon and sent her into Portland, Maine, where she arrived around 1 June. On 23 May Young Teazer captured the Falmouth Post Office Packet Service packet Ann.

Young Teazer left Portland on 3 June 1813 with 73 men on her second and final cruise under the command of William D. Dobson. On 1 June 1813, Shannon captured USS Chesapeake outside Boston Harbor and towed her to Halifax. While this was occurring, the crew of Young Teazer boarded a vessel off La Have but then released her, as she was in ballast and not worth taking. When the vessel reached Halifax, she reported the privateer's presence and description.

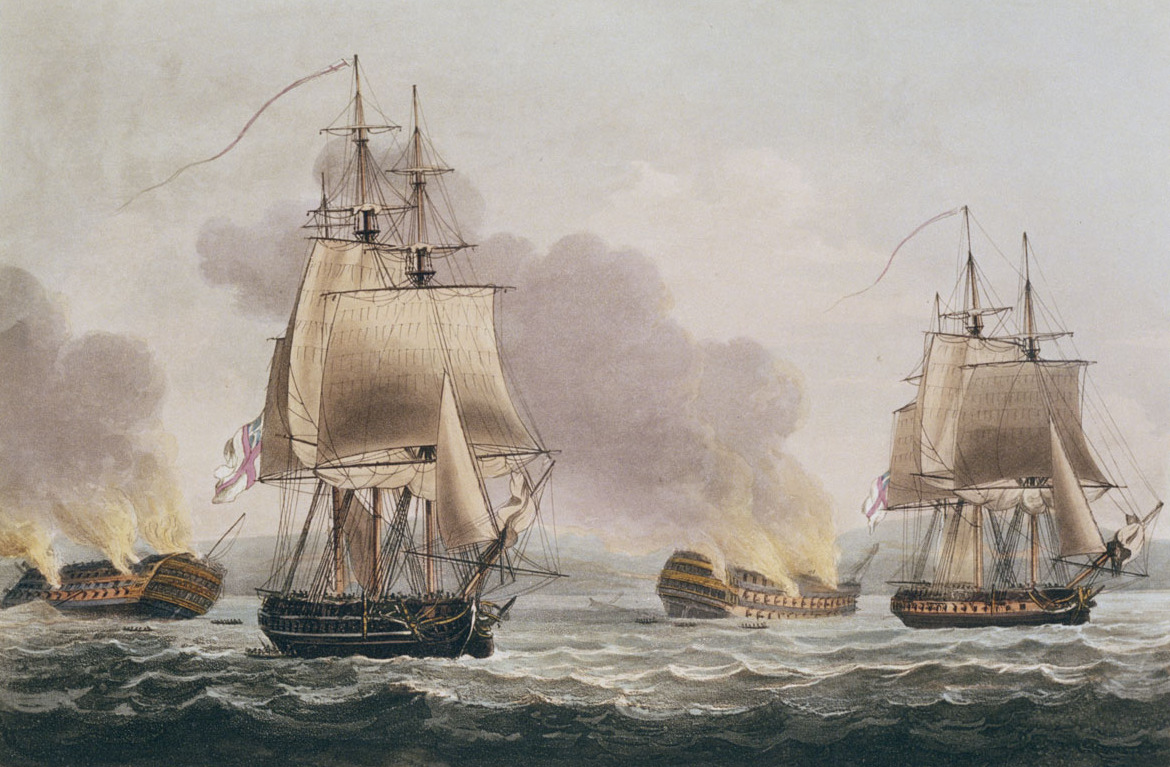
HMS Acasta (left), one of the ships involved in the chase of Young Teazer. The painting shows Acasta at the Battle of San Domingo

Young Teazer then captured two vessels off Sambro Island Light at the entrance to Halifax Harbor. She escaped possible capture by running into the harbor and raising British colors. The British discovered the ruse, but only after Young Teazer had left. A number of British warships sailed unsuccessfully in search of her.

HMS Hogue as she appeared after being razeed to a frigate and converted to a steamship in 1850

On 13 June 1813, the 74-gun third rate Hogue, commanded by Thomas Bladen Capel, encountered Young Teazer and forced her into Halifax Harbor, but she escaped the harbor again. On 17 June 1813, Valiant was in company with Acasta when they came upon HMS Wasp in pursuit of the American armed merchant brig Porcupine off Cape Sable. The three British ships continued the chase for another 100 miles (160 km) before they finally captured it. Wasp then sailed in search of Young Teazer.

A few days later, the frigate HMS Orpheus chased Young Teazer into Lunenburg, Nova Scotia but then lost her near Mahone Bay due to light winds. On 27 June, Hogue picked up the chase for 18 hours until she trapped Young Teazer in Mahone Bay between Mason Island and Rafuse Island. Hogue was firing "viciously" and Orpheus soon joined as well. In the evening, Hogue prepared to send a boarding party in five of her boats. Aboard Young Teazer, Captain Dobson discussed plans to defend the privateer with his crew, reduced to 38 men by prize crews sent off in captured vessels. Lieutenant Johnson was known for his erratic behavior on previous cruises; he argued with Dobson and then disappeared below. The schooner exploded a few minutes later. Other accounts say that Johnson feared hanging for breaking his parole and was seen rushing to the powder magazine. The British boats were three miles (4.8 km) from Young Teazer, and they returned to HMS Hogue after the explosion destroyed the schooner. Local residents rescued survivors, several of them badly burned, clinging to spars and the bow of the schooner. Thirty of her crew died. The militia secured the survivors, including the captain, and took charge of the wreckage. After being treated for their wounds, the captured privateersmen were sent to the Melville Island prisoner of war camp in Halifax. (Note: Head money was paid in July 1815 to the crew of Hogue for the prisoners. A first-class share was worth £30 19s 11¾d; a sixth-class share, that of an ordinary seaman, was worth 1s 11¼d.) Most were soon returned to the United States as part of the regular exchange of prisoners of war.

== Legacy ==
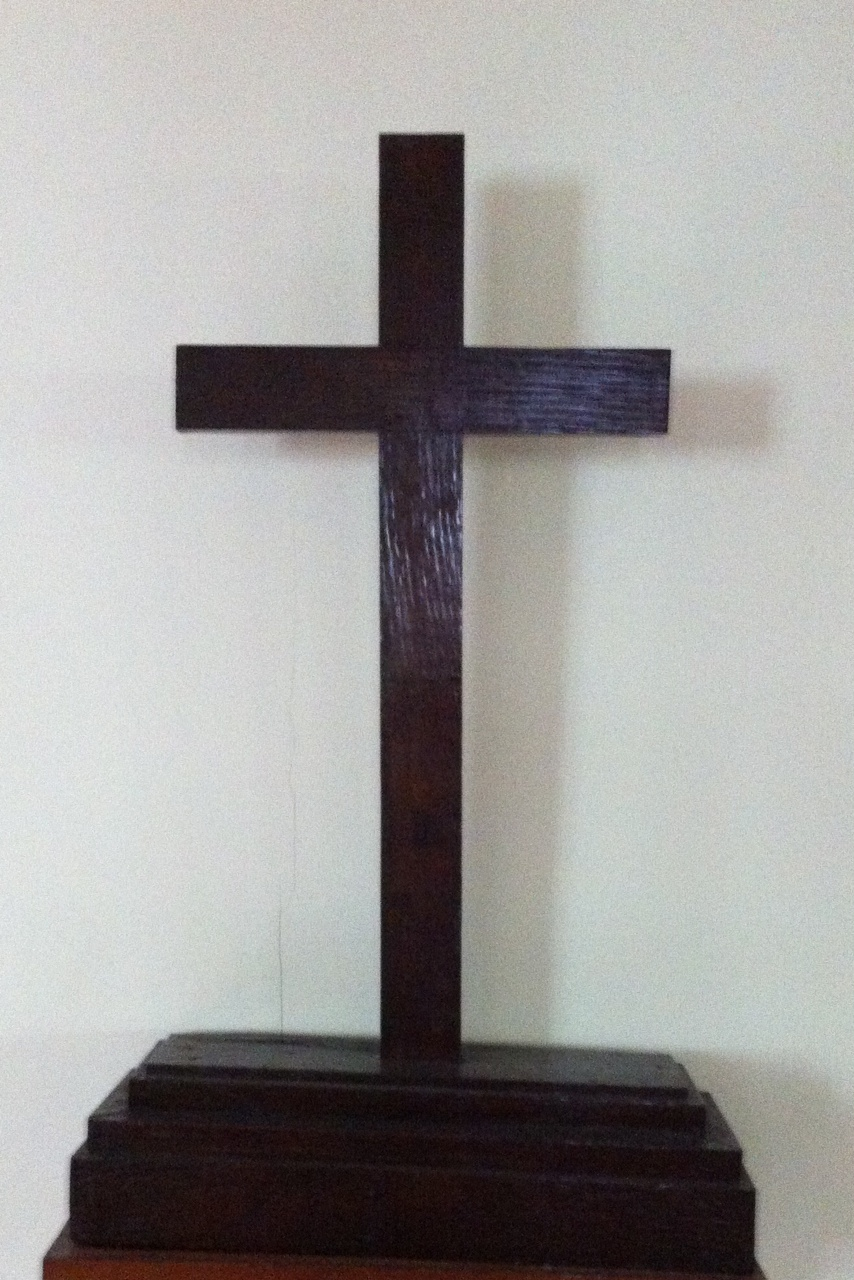
Cross fashioned from a fragment of the keel of Young Teazer, St. Stephen's Anglican Church at Chester

The hull of Young Teazer was gutted but still partially afloat, surrounded by floating bodies and wreckage, including her alligator figurehead and several Quaker guns (fake wooden cannons). Much of the wreckage was salvaged, including some timbers that were used for construction around Mahone Bay, such as the Rope Loft restaurant in Chester. A piece of the keel was used to build the wooden cross inside of St. Stephen's Anglican Church at Chester, and a scorched fragment of the keel and a cane made from Young Teazer fragments are displayed at the Maritime Museum of the Atlantic in Halifax.

The name of the schooner was briefly revived in July 1813 when the Nova Scotian privateer schooner Liverpool Packet was captured and converted to an American privateer named Young Teazer's Ghost. However, Young Teazer's Ghost failed to capture any ships and was soon recaptured by the British and her name of Liverpool Packet was restored.

The story of Young Teazer inspired one of the best-known ghost ship stories in Atlantic Canada, the so-called "Teazer Light". The folklore states that a fiery glow or a flaming ship regularly appears on Mahone Bay near the site of the explosion, often near the 27 June anniversary. Accounts were first recorded in the late 19th century. Folklorist Helen Creighton documented numerous versions of the story in her classic folklore book Bluenose Ghosts, although she noted that many sightings might be optical illusions during full moons. The gruesome end of the schooner and the many ghost stories have made Young Teazer into a well-known mythical figure in Nova Scotia.

== See also ==
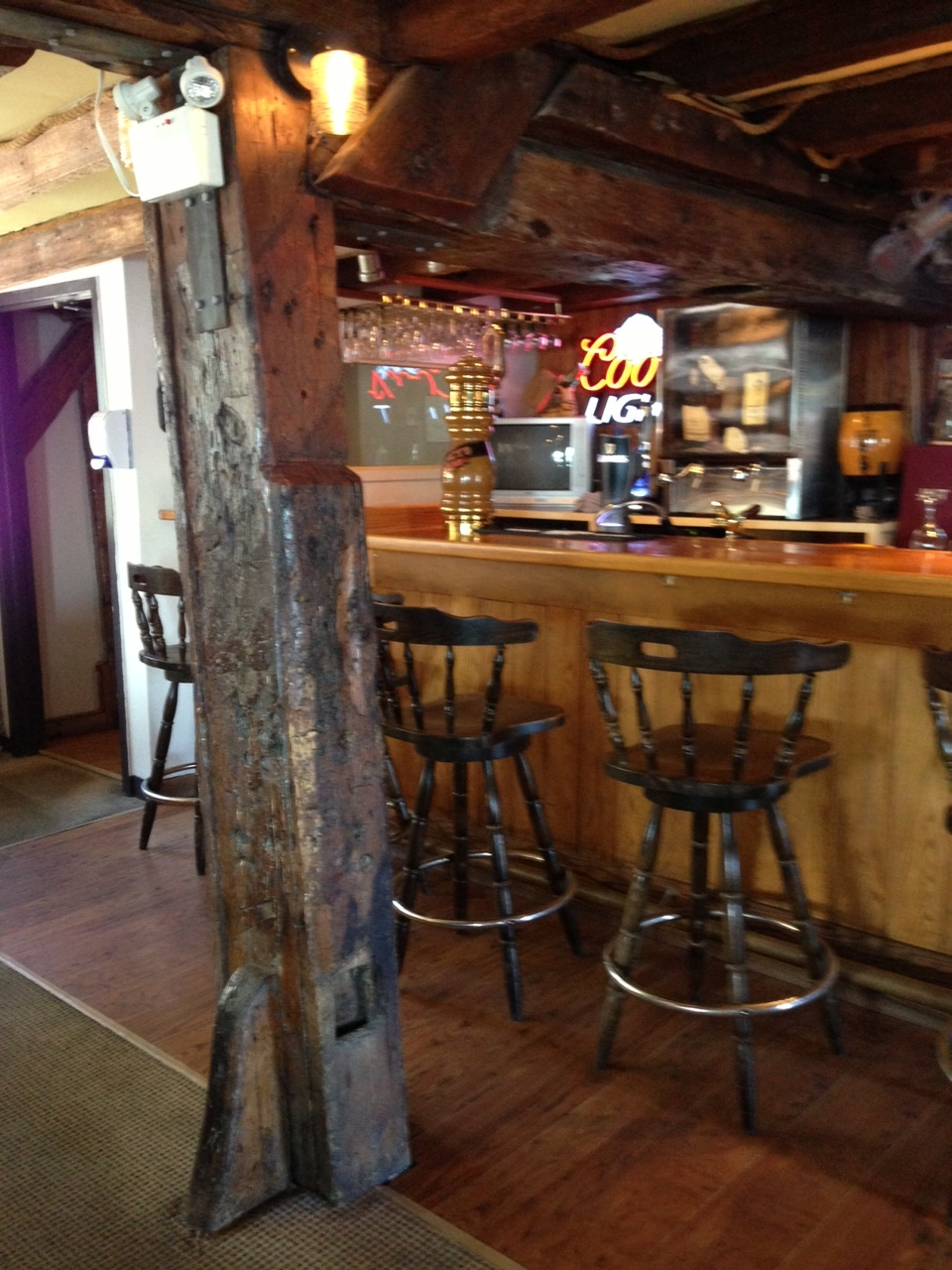
Post and beam from remains of ship Young Teazer, located at The Rope Loft, Chester, Nova Scotia

- Military history of Nova Scotia - War of 1812
