= Heritage Hill Historic District (Grand Rapids, Michigan) =

Historic district in Michigan, United States

Coordinates: 42.96322°N 85.65865°W

- U.S. National Register of Historic Places
- U.S. Historic district
- Michigan State Historic Site
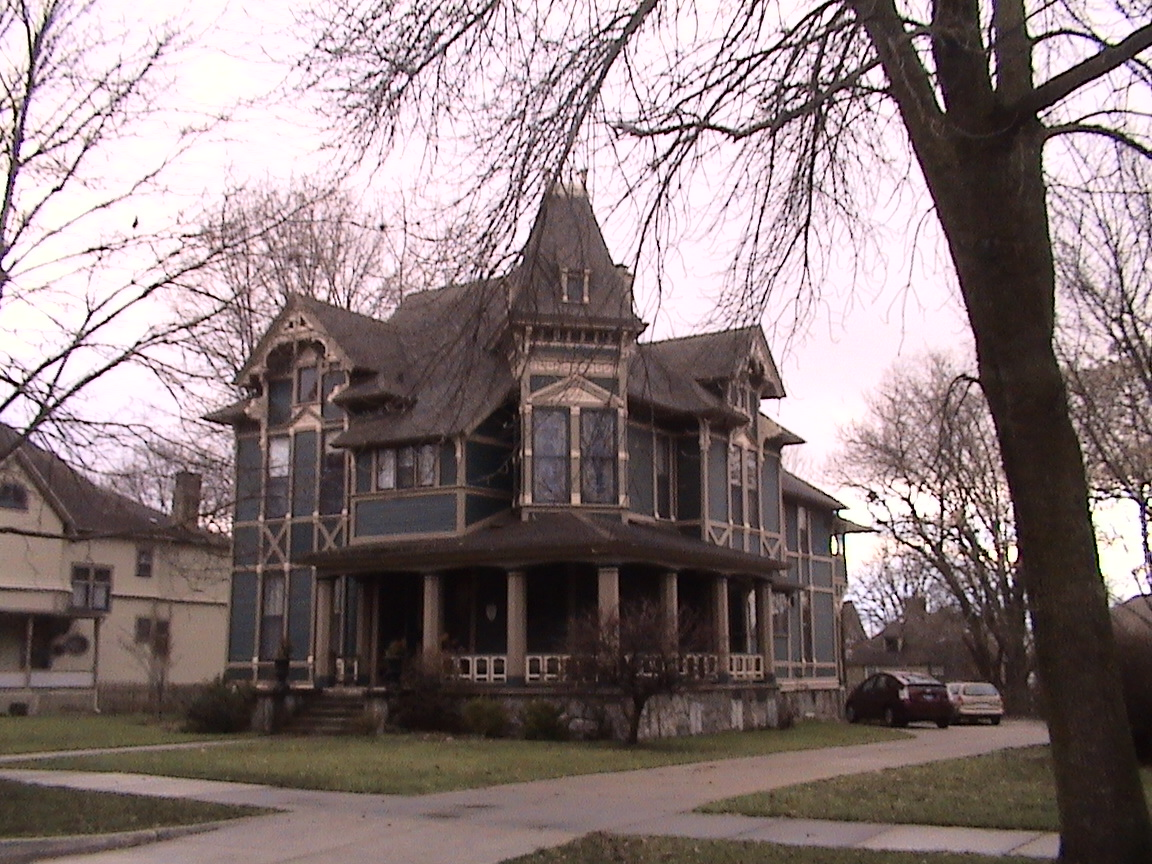

- Location within Michigan Location within the United States
- Interactive map showing Heritage Hill Historical District
- Location: Grand Rapids, Michigan
- Architect: Frank Lloyd Wright; Multiple
- Architectural style: Colonial Revival, Greek Revival, Italianate
- NRHP reference No.: 71000399
- Added to NRHP: March 11, 1971

Heritage Hill is also a state park in Green Bay, Wisconsin

Heritage Hill is a residential neighborhood in Grand Rapids, Michigan. It is listed on the National Register of Historic Places and is one of the largest urban historic districts in the United States. It is bounded by Crescent Street (north), Union Avenue (east), Pleasant Street (south), and Lafayette Avenue (west). Heritage Hill was designated by the American Planning Association as one of 2012's Great Places in America.

== Description ==
Heritage Hill is adjacent to downtown Grand Rapids and is the city's oldest residential district. Its 1,300 homes date from 1844 and represent Michigan's largest and finest concentration of nineteenth and early twentieth-century houses. Nearly every style of American architecture, from Greek Revival to Prairie is represented. These were the homes of lumber barons, teachers, judges, and legislators who shaped the city's future. It is home to about 4,400 residents and covers an area of about 1 square mile. A number of architectural styles are included in the historic district including Greek Revival, Italianate, Colonial Revival, Chateauesque, Queen Anne, Shingle Style and over 50 others. There is also a Prairie Style house designed by Frank Lloyd Wright which was built in 1908-09.

== History ==
In the 1960s, urban renewal efforts throughout Grand Rapids called for demolishing up to 75% of the neighborhood. However, protests from residents led to the organization of the Heritage Hill Association, in 1968. The residents filed court challenges and were able to stop the loss of historic neighborhood properties under the 1966 National Historic Preservation Act. This was the first such case of the use of a successful suit to protect a neighborhood's character under the Act.

Today, the Heritage Hill Association provides neighbors a way of collectively building a healthy, historically preserved community where people can live and work in a secure and stable environment. Issues include land use, crime and safety concerns, preservation, parking and traffic, education and other quality of life issues. Heritage Hill was added to the National Register of Historic Places and the Michigan State Register of Historic Sites in 1971.

The Master Plan of Heritage Hill, approved by the city in 1988 and incorporated into the city's 2002 master plan, helped shape the restoration and development of the neighborhood's many historical properties, as did the 1992 Prospect Plan. When the city approved the Mary Free Bed Rehabilitation Hospital's parking ramp, it attached funding to carry out the prospect plan as one of the conditions.

Prior to its designation as a National Historic District a number of homes were demolished. One notable home that was lost was the Bissell house, built for Melville R. Bissell (inventor of the carpet sweeper) & his wife Anna. The site is now occupied by Grand Rapids' NBC television affiliate station, WOOD-TV Channel 8.

Each year in May, the Heritage Hill Association sponsors a weekend Home Tour in the Historic District that includes admittance to select homes. The Association also publishes a series of self-guided walking tours of the historic district which can be taken at any time, but which does not include admittance to the homes.

== Today ==
Heritage Hill has remained very well preserved. Annual tours of select homes within the district are given every May.

== Select historic sites ==
- Meyer May House
- David M Amberg House
- Voigt House
- McCabe-Marlowe House
