= Amet Sound =

Sound in Canada

Coordinates: 45°47′N 63°12′W

Amet Sound is a large body of water, an embayment of the Northumberland Strait, on the north shore Nova Scotia straddling Colchester and Pictou counties. It takes its name from Amet Island, a small island just beyond the mouth of the sound in Northumberland Strait. Because of its sheltered position, its bays and harbours are considered "safe haven" for yachts in the event of major storms.

== Geography ==
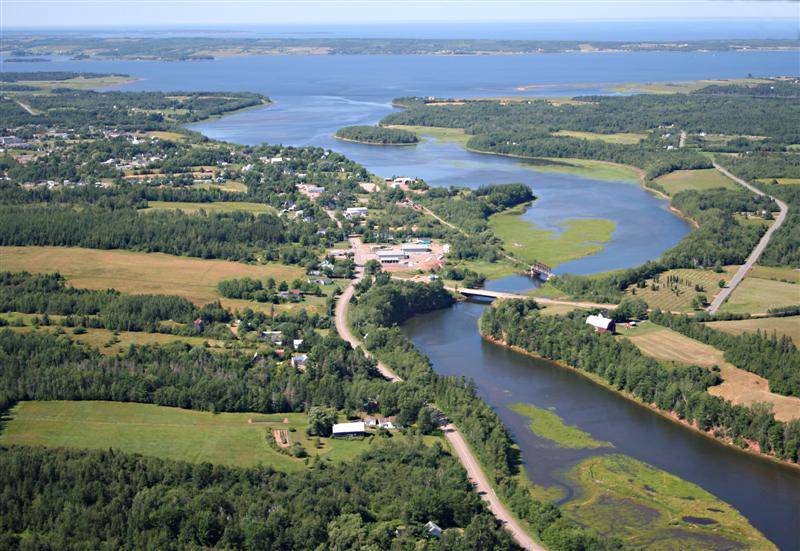
Aerial view of Tatamagouche, looking north-northwest along the Waugh River toward Tatamagouche Bay and Amet Sound.

Extending 19 kilometres (12 mi) east to west and 7.8 kilometres (4.8 mi) north to south, this wide and shallow sound is separated from the Northumberland Strait by Malagash Point peninsula on the west and Cape John on the east. Its inland extensions include Tatamagouche Bay to the west-southwest, Barrachois Harbour to the southwest, Brule Harbour to the south and John Bay to the southeast. In total it has an area of 112.2 square kilometres (43.3 sq mi) and a perimeter of 84 kilometres (52 mi), with a maximum depth of 12.5 metres (41 ft). The mean tidal range is 1.6 metres (5.2 ft) with large tides measuring over 2.5 metres (8.2 ft) The watershed measures 971.7 square kilometres (375.2 sq mi) and the major streams draining the watershed are the Waugh River and River John.

== Cultural aspects ==
Surrounding land uses are mostly agricultural and recreational. The Barrachois Harbour Yacht Club is the focus of most recreational boating on the Sound. A Tim Horton Children's Camp is situated on Tatamagouche Bay, while Nelson Memorial Park, a municipal picnic park and floral garden is situated near Tatamagouche and the Rushtons Beach provincial day use park is located in Marshville. The main populated centres are at Tatamagouche on the Waugh River, and River John at the extreme easterly end of the sound. Historically, the area had numerous lobster canneries which were active in the first quarter of the twentieth century.
