= 2024 Pictou West provincial by-election =

Provincial by-election in Nova Scotia, Canada

- May 21, 2024

Riding of Pictou West
- Turnout: 48.1% (▼13.4)
| | First party | Second party | Third party |
|---|---|---|---|
| | PC | NDP | LIB |
| Candidate | Marco MacLeod | Melinda MacKenzie | Mary Wooldridge-Elliott |
| Party | Progressive Conservative | New Democratic | Liberal |
| Popular vote | 4,159 | 949 | 548 |
| Percentage | 72.48% | 16.54% | 9.55% |
| Swing | ▲8.86 | ▲4.18 | ▼11.86 |
MLA before election
Karla MacFarlane
Progressive Conservative
Elected MLA
Marco MacLeod
Progressive Conservative

A by-election was held in the provincial riding of Pictou West in Nova Scotia on May 21, 2024, to elect a new member of the Nova Scotia House of Assembly following the resignation of Progressive Conservative MLA Karla MacFarlane. The deadline for candidate nominations is May 1, 2024.

Progressive Conservative Premier Tim Houston called the by-election quickly, only two weeks after MacFarlane's resignation, suggesting the party is confident they will hold the seat.

On election day, the Progressive Conservative candidate, Marco MacLeod, a local sawmill owner won the seat with over 70 per cent of the vote. The NDP, and its candidate, Melinda McKenzie finished second and claimed a 'strong showing'. The Liberals finished in third for the second by-election in a row (they also finished third in the 2023 Preston provincial by-election), and lost their deposit by failing to get 10 per cent of the votes.

== Background ==
The riding spans from western Pictou County to River John in the central part of the province. Its main centre is the town of Pictou.

The Progressive Conservatives have held the seat since the 2013 election when MacFarlane defeated the incumbent, Charlie Parker of the Nova Scotia New Democratic Party in a relatively close race. Since defeating Parker, she has enjoyed landslide victories in both the 2017 and 2021 elections, winning over 60 per cent of the vote in both elections.

== Candidates ==
- Clare Brett (Green): She was the candidate for Pictou West in the 2021 election.
- Melinda MacKenzie (NDP): She is a councillor for the town of Pictou and works as a teacher.
- Marco MacLeod (Progressive Conservative): He is a small business owner and farmer from Scotsburn. Owns a small custom lumber mill.
- Mary Wooldridge-Elliott (Liberal): She is the councillor for District 4 in Pictou County. She previously ran for the Liberals in Pictou West in the 2021 election. She is also a school bus driver.

== Issues ==
The province's health care system and the cost of living were cited as the main issues of the campaign. Local issues include constructing wind turbines in the area, and re-opening a pulp mill. Bear Head Energy is proposing the construction 100 wind turbines in the eastern part of the county outside the riding, which is opposed by many in the community. Of the four candidates, only the Green Party's Clare Brett supports this. Northern Pulp is proposing re-opening a pulp mill in the region, which has been closed for five years.

== Election results ==
Nova Scotia provincial by-election, May 21, 2024 Resignation of Karla MacFarlane
| Party | Candidate | Votes | % | ±% | Expenditures |
|---|---|---|---|---|---|
| Progressive Conservative | Marco MacLeod | 4,159 | 72.48 | +8.86 | $47,956 |
| New Democratic | Melinda MacKenzie | 949 | 16.54 | +4.18 | $38,663 |
| Liberal | Mary Wooldridge-Elliott | 548 | 9.55 | -11.86 | $15,865 |
| Green | Clare Brett | 82 | 1.43 | -0.33 | – |
| Total valid votes/Expense limit | | 5,738 | 99.29 | | |
| Total rejected ballots | | 43 | 0.74 | | |
| Turnout | | 5,781 | 47.73 | -13.71 | |
| Eligible voters | | 12,112 | | | |
| Progressive Conservative hold | | Swing | | +2.34 | |
Source: Elections Nova Scotia

== 2021 result ==
2021 Nova Scotia general election: Pictou West
| Party | Candidate | Votes | % | ±% | Expenditures |
|---|---|---|---|---|---|
| Progressive Conservative | Karla MacFarlane | 4,487 | 63.62 | +1.04 | $26,401.55 |
| Liberal | Mary Wooldridge-Elliott | 1,510 | 21.41 | +4.95 | $29,635.78 |
| New Democratic | Rick Parker | 872 | 12.36 | -6.30 | $25,332.33 |
| Green | Clare Brett | 124 | 1.76 | -0.54 | $200.00 |
| Independent | John A. Clark | 60 | 0.85 | | $200.00 |
| Total valid votes/expense limit | | 7,053 | 99.63 | – | $69,087.61 |
| Total rejected ballots | | 26 | 0.37 | | |
| Turnout | | 7,079 | 61.44 | | |
| Eligible voters | | 11,521 | | | |
| Progressive Conservative hold | | Swing | | -1.96 | |
Source: Elections Nova Scotia

== See also ==
- List of Nova Scotia by-elections
