= Cape John, Nova Scotia =

Cape John
- Community
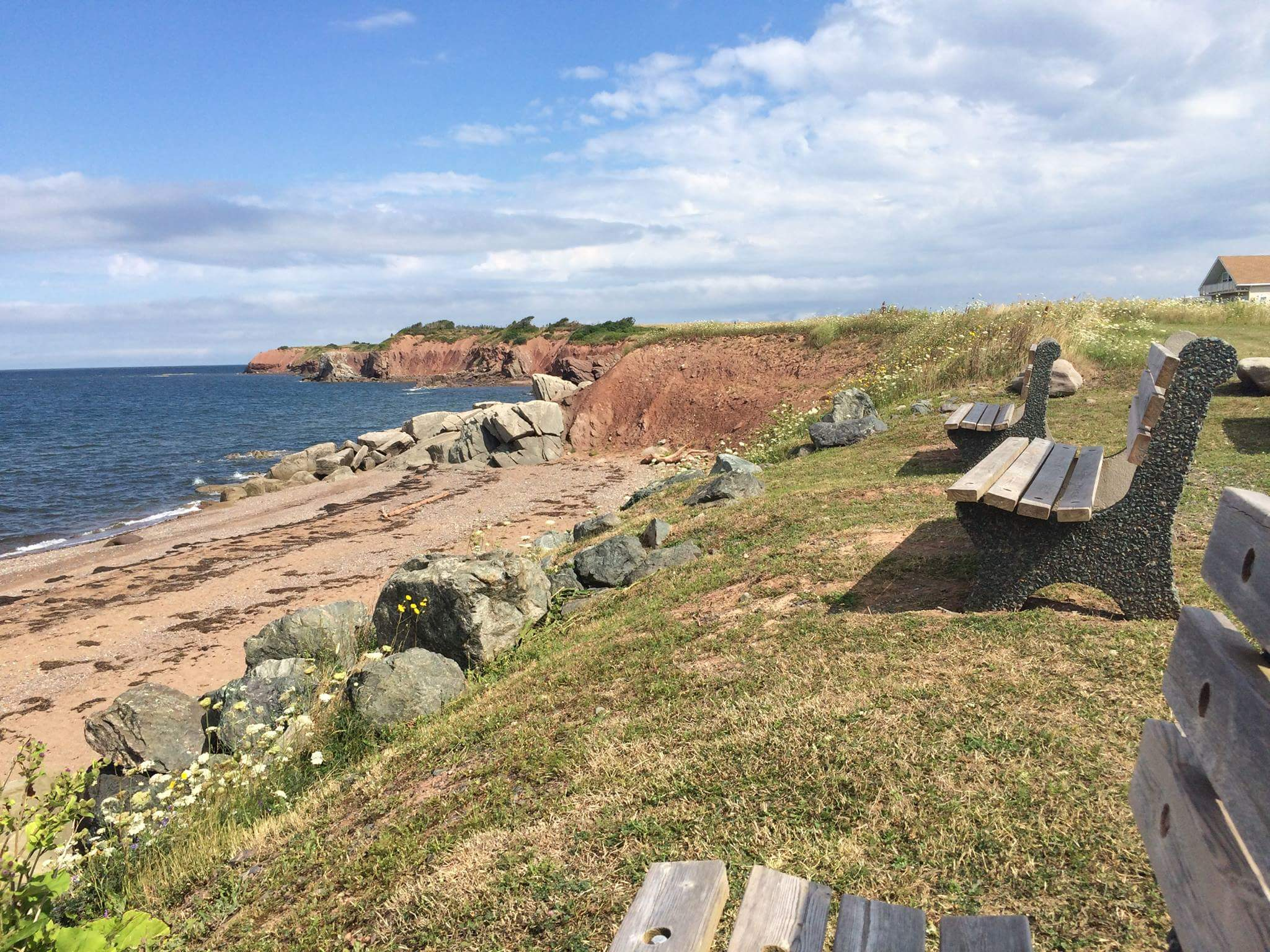
- Cape John Beach

- Location of Seafoam, Nova Scotia
- Coordinates: 45°47′25″N 63°5′57″W
- Country: Canada
- Province: Nova Scotia
- County: Pictou County
- Municipality: Municipality of Pictou County
- District: 4

Government
  - Councillor, District 4: Ronald Baillie
  - MLA, Pictou West: Marco MacLeod
  - MP, Central Nova: Sean Fraser
- Highest elevation: 20 m (66 ft)
- Lowest elevation: 0 m (0 ft)
- Time zone: UTC-4 (AST)
  - Summer (DST): UTC-3 (ADT)
- Canadian Postal Code: B0K 1N0
- Area code and exchange: (902) 351-xxxx
- Website: riverjohn.com

Cape John is an unincorporated community in the Canadian province of Nova Scotia, located in Pictou County. It is situated on a cape, bordered by the Northumberland Strait to the north and John Bay, the estuary of the River John, to the south.

A breakwater protects a small harbour and wharves, which are used mainly by small fishing boats and recreational users. There is a fish processing plant near the harbour which mainly handles lobster.

Cape John Beach is a 3 ha Provincial Park Reserve (protected land that has the potential to be a provincial park) which provides public beach access and habitat for a range of birds.

The geology of the area consists of floodplain mudstone, fluvial sandstone, arkosic sandstone, minor amounts of conglomerate and lacustrine limestone all belonging to the Cape John Formation of the Pictou Group of the Stephanian epoch of the Late Carboniferous period, approximately 300 million years ago.
