= Sea foam (disambiguation) =

Sea foam is a type of foam that appears in bodies of salt water. It can also refer to:

- Honeycomb toffee, a type of candy
- A shade of the color green
- A literal translation of "meerschaum"
- Hugh "Seafoam" McDuck, a Disney character who is an ancestor of Scrooge McDuck and Donald Duck
- An engine additive added to oil or gasoline, manufactured by the Seafoam Company of Chaska, Minnesota
- The plant Teloxys aristata is also known as 'Seafoam'
- Seafoam, Nova Scotia
