= River John, Nova Scotia =

River John
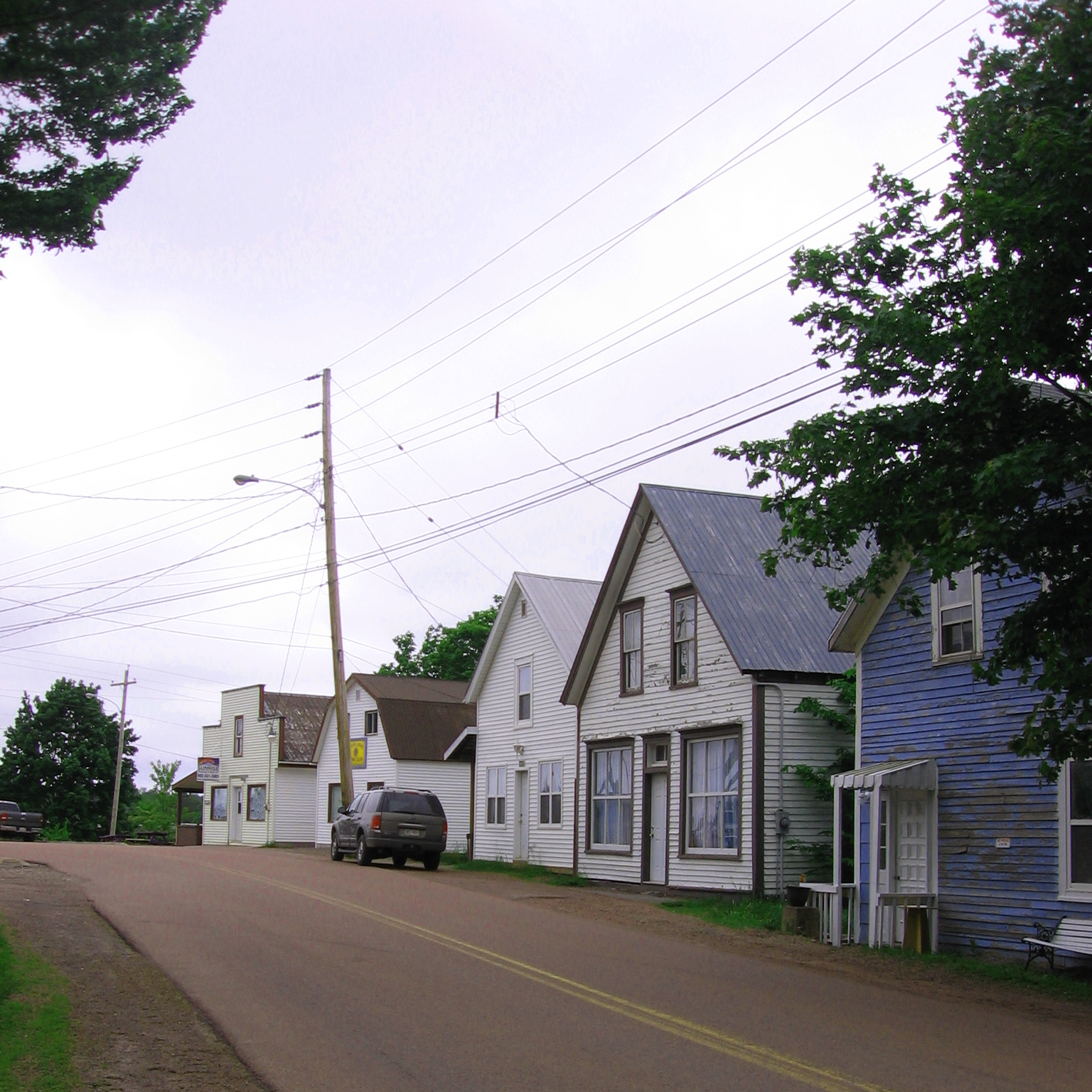

- Location within Nova Scotia
- Coordinates: 45°44′55″N 63°03′28″W
- Country: Canada
- Province: Nova Scotia
- County: Pictou County
- Municipality: Municipality of Pictou County
- District: 4
- Communities: Bigney, Black River, Brook Road, Cape John, Caribou River, College Grant, Diamond, Dufferin, East Branch River John, Elmfield, Fitzpatrick, Hedgeville, Hodson, Loganville, Louisville, MacKays Corner, Marshville, Meadowville, Melville, Mountain Road, Plainfield, Poplar Hill, River John, Rogers, Seafoam, Sundridge, Toney Mills, Toney River, Welsford, West Branch River John, Westerly

Government
  - Governing Body: Pictou County Municipal Council
  - Councillor: Ronnie Baillie
  - MLA: Marco MacLeod
  - MP: Sean Fraser

Area
  - Total: 430 km^{2} (170 sq mi)

Population (2006)
  - Total: 2,399
  - Density: 5.6/km^{2} (15/sq mi)
- Time zone: UTC-4 (AST)
  - Summer (DST): UTC-3 (ADT)
- Postal code: B0K 1N0
- Area code: 902
- Telephone Exchange: 351
- Website: riverjohn.com
- Part of a series about Places in Nova Scotia

River John is an unincorporated community in Pictou County, Nova Scotia, Canada.

It is located near the mouth of the River John on the Northumberland Strait, halfway between Pictou and Tatamagouche near the boundary with Colchester County. It is on Nova Scotia Trunk 6 and the designated tourist route, the Sunrise Trail.

River John was colonized by Europeans during the 18th century and its port and the proximity of plentiful timber led to the development of a small shipbuilding industry.

The local economy is based on the seasonal industries of fishing, agriculture, and tourism. The area is a popular summer cottage location for residents of Halifax and other urban areas in the province. The village supports a few local shops, a library, several churches, a post office and a volunteer fire department. The K-9 school was closed in 2015.

== History ==
The river was originally called Caijebouguac (lonely river) by the indigenous Mikmaq. ‘River John’ has a name of French origin but the English named the river Deception River, although this name has been lost and is used only by very few elderly residents. The name ‘River John’ came to be as almost all of the original settlers had the name John; John George, John Patriquin, etc.

The first official settlers in River John were four men and their families who did not want to pay as tenants in the nearby village of Tatamagouche. At the time the land was part of the Philadelphia grant owned by a company that had no longer use for it, so it was sold off. In 1785, John Frederic Patriquin, John George Patriquin, George Frederic Langill (or Langille) and James Gratto each built their log cabins near each other originally and then more settlers came in each taking their own land.

=== Shipbuilding ===
River John was a thriving community in the mid-1800s with as many as four vessels under construction at once with many sailing around the world. The first vessel launched was the Robert MacKay in 1825. The production of larger ships began around 1835, when Alexander McKenzie built the barque (typically a three-mast sailing ship in which the front and mainmast are square rigged and only the mizzen is front and rear) Charles weighing at 519 tons. The first vessel to exceed 1,000 tons was the Mary P. Kitchin in 1874.

River John built Pictou County's largest sailing ships, the Warrior and the Caldera. The Warrior measured 221’ long, 50’5", 24’2" in depth, weighing 1,687.27 tons with two and a quarter decks. The Caldera was launched a fortnight after her rival. She was longer than the Warrior but with less deck tonnage, 230’ long, breadth 39’ 5", hold depth 24’1", and weighed 1,575 tons. The Caldera was one of the more well-known ships in the province to have made at least one voyage around the world.

In the area there was a cricket field, a skating rink and a YMCA hall. It is noted in the Forbes’ MS, “with the shipbuilding squires stepping out for church on Sunday mornings or driving their matched bays on Saturday afternoon, River John was able to hold its own with the best of the country.”

The timber for ships was cut by hand and hauled out by horse or oxen to a cleared space near the building site. The launch site was on the area what is now called “River Road”, the ships faced into the sunset with the heavy planks set down into the water for a gentle slide into the channel in the mouth of the bay. There still are traces of the launch site during low tide hidden by the mudflats. With the construction of the railway and improved roads, the need for waterborne transportation dwindled.

=== Quarrying ===
Two quarries extracted sandstone from along the River John in the late 1800s and early 1900s. Most was shipped to Toronto, but the piers of the nearby railway bridge were constructed from it.

== Governance ==
River John is in the federal electoral district of Central Nova and the provincial riding of Pictou West. It is in District 4 of the Municipality of Pictou County which provides street lighting, waste water disposal and snow ploughing of sidewalks.

== School ==
In 1808, the school was opened under Reverend John Mitchelle who came from Amherst to River John, with Christopher Perrin as the schoolmaster. In 1818 the first school was built with James Hogg and Edward Lynch as some of the first teachers that year. Another school had to be built at the cross roads of Main and what is now School Street, but was torn down in 1968. There were also small schools located on the properties of the late Rev. John Mitchelle and the late D. Mackay Ross. Each surrounding rural community had their own one room school house, Mountain Road, Louisville, Marshville, Cape John, Seafoam, Melville, Hodson, Hedgeville, Bigney, Welsford, and Toney River.

The River John Consolidated School was built in 1968 at the top of School Street with a few hundred students attending, with the new addition built in 1985 around when one of the old schools was torn down near it. Until its closure in 2015, the school held students from K-9. Students in high school had to go to West Pictou High School in Lyons Brook, and more recently Northumberland Regional High in Alma.

== Newspaper ==
The Pioneer community newspaper began publishing in 1877 on every Thursday in River John, with a subscription rate of 50 cents for the year. The Pioneer contained business ads that were prominent during the shipbuilding days, carriage building, local events such as kitchen parties, fancy goods and patient mediation ads since the paper was edited and published by J. D. Gauld.

With the decline of shipbuilding which resulted in loss of many businesses in the late 1880s, the Pioneer ran its last issue.

In July 2014, The Pioneer was resurrected again after near 130 years. It is now published three times a year by the River John Community Action Society as a not-for-profit community-owned paper and distributed freely throughout the B0K 1N0 postal area.

== Tourism and recreation ==
Since 1999, River John has hosted the annual Read By the Sea literary festival. Featured guests have included Alexander MacLeod and Margaret Atwood.

The Colonel Dan Sutherland Memorial Park includes a ballfield used for tournaments in summer and fall. In 2024, outdoor pickleball courts opened in the grounds of the local Royal Canadian Legion.

The Trans Canada Trail runs through the outskirts of River John along the route of the former "Short Line" of the Intercolonial Railway. It is used by walkers, bikers, ATV riders, snowmobilers, cross country skiers and snowshoers.

== Notable people ==
The Nova Scotian folklorist W. Roy MacKenzie (1883–1957) lived in River John, as do novelist Linda Little and writer Sheree Fitch. Anna Sutherland Bissell, CEO of Bissell was born here in 1846.
