= Meyer May House =

House in Grand Rapids, Michigan

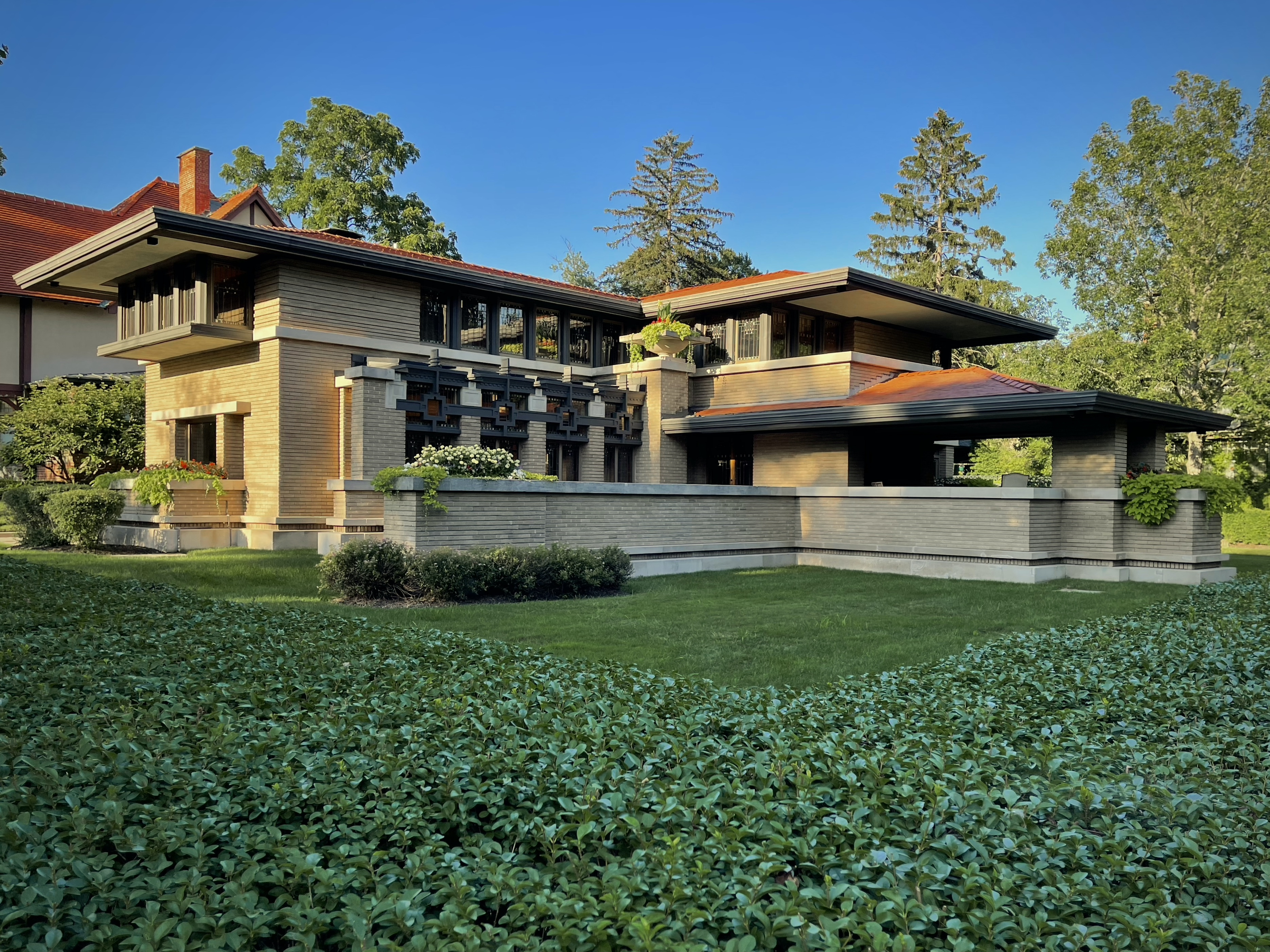

- Location within Michigan
- Interactive map showing the Meyer May's house location

General information
- Type: Brick house
- Architectural style: Prairie School
- Location: 450 Madison Avenue SE, Grand Rapids, MI
- Coordinates: 42.954189°N 85.659189°W
- Construction started: 1908
- Completed: 1909
- Governing body: Steelcase

Design and construction
- Architect: Frank Lloyd Wright

The Meyer May House is a Frank Lloyd Wright-designed house in the Heritage Hill Historic District of Grand Rapids, Michigan, United States. It was built between 1908 and 1909 for the May family, and is located at 450 Madison Avenue SE. It is considered a fine example of Wright's Prairie School era, and "Michigan's Prairie masterpiece". The house is considered one of the most completely restored of Wright's Prairie residences, and has been listed as a Michigan State Historic Site and is a National Register of Historic Places contributing property.

== History ==
The Meyer May House was commissioned in 1908 by Meyer S. May, president of May's clothing store in Grand Rapids, and his wife, Sophie. The Mays commissioned Frank Lloyd Wright to construct the building, with George Mann Niedecken supervising and coordinating the interior design of the home. The house's appearance stands in contrast to the Victorian houses typical of the period and in the Heritage Hill neighborhood.

In 1922, two bedrooms were added upstairs, as were servants' quarters on the ground floor. After May died in 1936, the house remained empty for six years, not selling until 1942. Sold again in 1945, carports and additional entrances were added, and the bedroom additions were rented out. In 1985, Steelcase, an international office furniture company founded and headquartered in Grand Rapids, purchased the home and initiated restoration efforts. When Steelcase was acquired by HNI Corporation in 2025, it was unclear whether HNI would retain the house.

The Meyer May House was placed on the Michigan State Register of Historic Sites in 1986 and is also part of the Heritage Hill Historic District. The Heritage Hill district was listed in 1971 on both the National Register of Historic Places.

=== Restoration ===
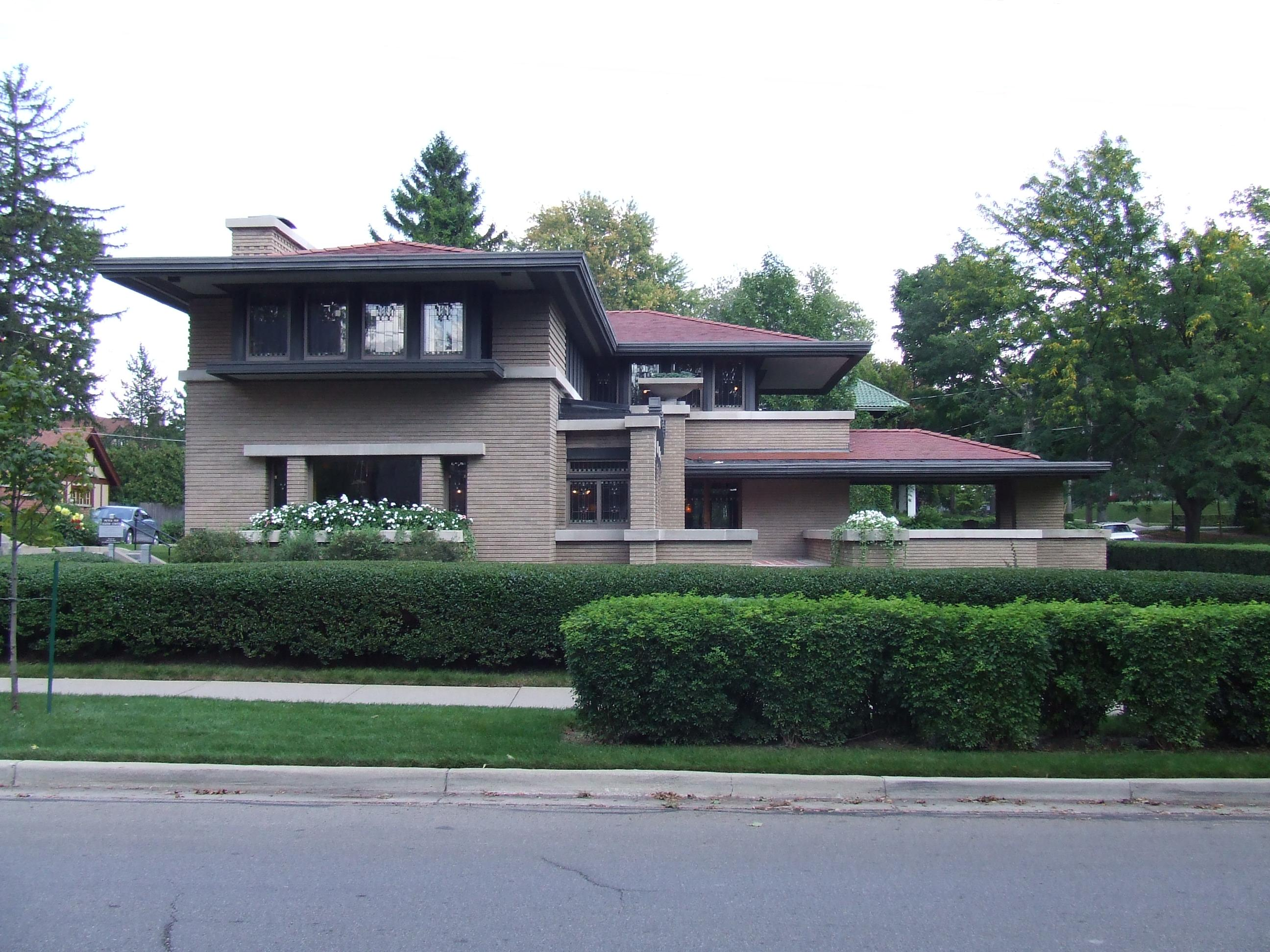
Madison Ave facade

Before restoration began, extensive research into the home's original 1909 state was conducted through interviews, historic photos, original drawings and documents, and publications about Wright. During this restoration, the 1922 addition was removed, all of the plaster ceilings were replaced, the roof was rebuilt, the Niedecken mural was restored, more than 100 windows and skylights were repaired, and an enclosed veranda was opened up. New roof tiles were produced by the original 1909 manufacturer, and the landscaping was restored to its original design.

Restoration began in 1986, and the house opened to the public for free visitor tours in 1987. Rooms in the restored house are furnished with a mixture of original and reproduced pieces, and similar Arts and Crafts style items from the period. Carpets were also woven according to Wright's designs and colors.

== Architecture ==
The Meyer May House is stylistically typical of Wright's Prairie houses, featuring a two-story, T-plan construction of pale brick, with Ludowici-tiled hip roofs and long broad eaves, art glass windows and skylights. The first floor windows are tucked under the eaves and raised from ground level, providing both privacy and providing light to the staircase and second floor gallery. Wright carefully sited the house to allow maximum southern exposure for the living room windows and skylights and to create a spacious yard for the perennial gardens. Leaded and colored glass accented doors and casement windows open out to terraces and gardens with garden walls and planters incorporated into the design.

Inside, wood grills hide the radiators, and iridescent strips of gold art glass were placed in the horizontal grout lines of both brick fireplaces. A pastel mural of hollyhocks created by George Mann Niedecken is featured on a dividing wall between the living room and dining room. The mural had been painted over, but has since been restored.

== Wright's other Grand Rapids work ==
The David M. Amberg House was completed in 1910. This house is not a complete Wright design, as he was preoccupied and traveling in Europe at the time. In 1909, Wright turned the project over to Marion Mahony and Herman von Holst for completion.

== See also ==
- List of Frank Lloyd Wright works
