= Ewbank =

British mechanical carpet sweeper brand

Ewbank Products Ltd.
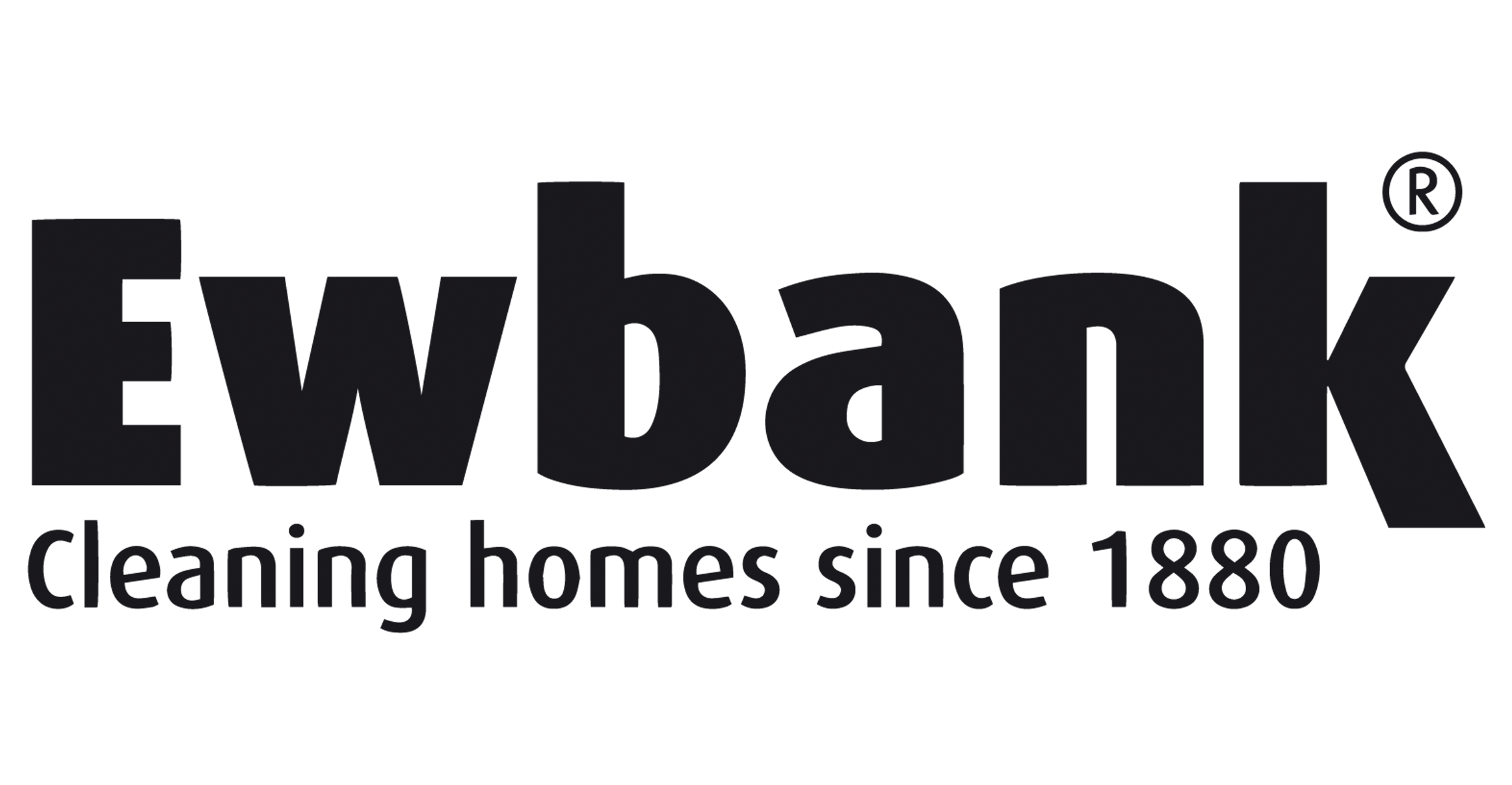
- Industry: Technology
- Founded: 1864
- Headquarters: Ipswich, Suffolk, England, UK
- Products: Carpet Sweepers; Vacuum Cleaners; Floor Cleaners; Floor Polishers; Carpet & Upholstery Cleaners; Steam Cleaners; Carpet Shampooers; Spray Mops; Pressure Washers; Outdoor Sweepers
- Website: www.ewbank.co.uk

Ewbank is a brand of cleaning products founded in the United Kingdom in 1864. Originally owned by Entwisle and Kenyon Ltd, the brand was acquired by Bluestem Group in 2023.

== History ==
In 1864, Ewbank was founded in Accrington, Lancashire, by John Ramsbottom and George Hacking. Originally the company produced water meters. They were joined by John Haworth, James Entwisle, and James Kenyon. When the founders retired, the company was renamed Entwisle and Kenyon Limited. Around 1875, Entwisle & Kenyon began manufacturing washing machines and mangles.

In 1882 Richard Walton Kenyon visited the U.S. to source wooden blocks for mangles, and came across a carpet sweeper factory in Chicago. Recognizing the potential for the product in the UK market, Kenyon designed a carpet sweeper for Ewbank. It went on sale in 1889, and became the leading product of its kind in the UK, where carpet sweeping became commonly known as "ewbanking". The name 'Ewbank' originated from the Ewbank area of Accrington, where the factory was located. Several models of sweepers were produced, such as the 'Standard' and 'Parlour Queen', as well as miniature versions designed specifically for children.

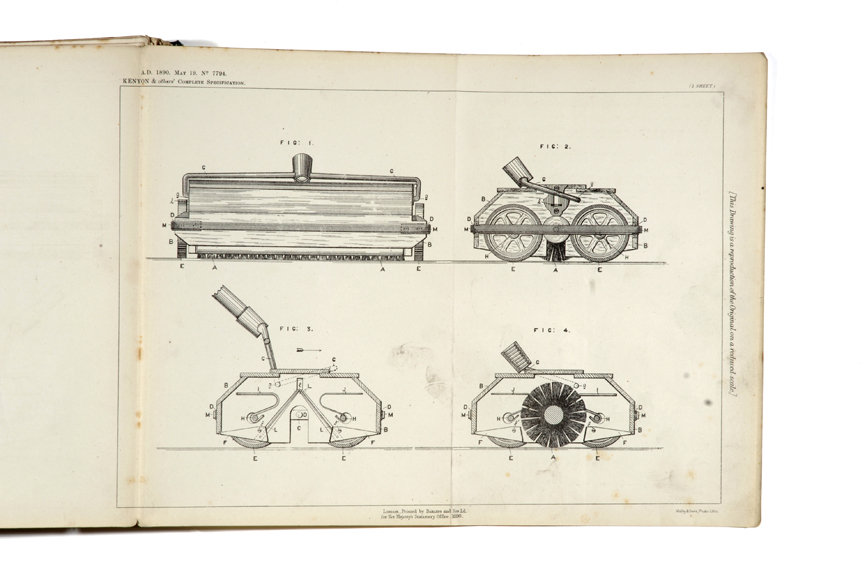
Technical drawings of one of Ewbank's first carpet sweepers

Following World War II Ewbank established itself as a major manufacturer of floor-care products, with a presence both in the UK, US, and internationally. While the initial models used metal casing, by the mid 1970's the sweepers were made from Novodur.

By the mid-1970s Ewbank was owned by Prestige. In 2003, the company was acquired by Earlex Ltd. In November 2013 Ewbank became independent once again and has since established subsidiary companies in the US and Hong Kong.

Electrical appliance manufacturer Bluestem Group began licensing the Ewbank brand in 2019, overseeing product development, distribution and marketing in the UK. Bluestem Group then acquired the brand in 2023 and has since been investing in further new product development and marketing.

== Product Range ==
Ewbank's product range still includes their signature carpet sweepers, and has now expanded to include vacuum cleaners, floor cleaners & polishers, carpet & upholstery cleaners, steam cleaners, carpet shampooers, spray mops, pressure washers, and outdoor sweepers.

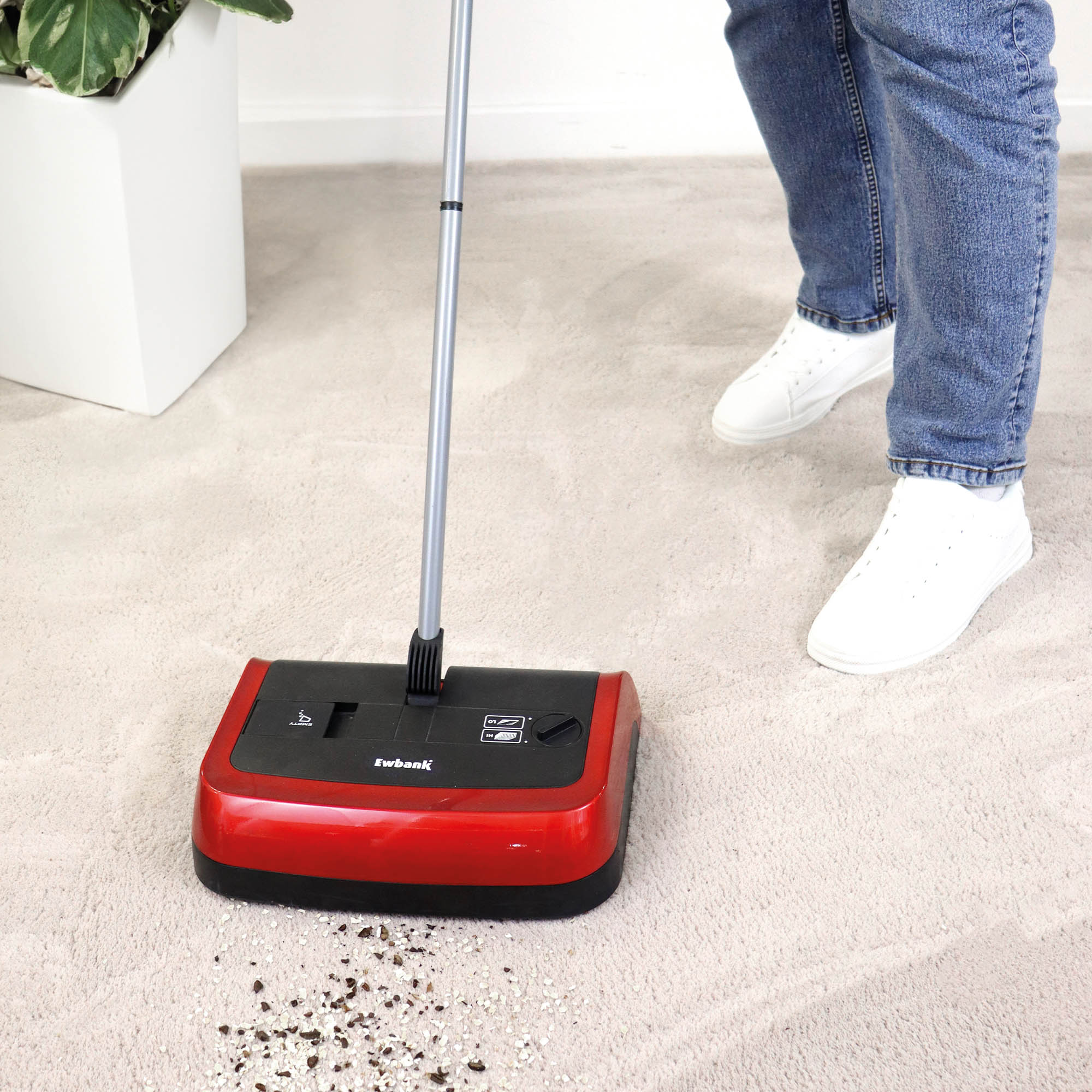
Ewbank's EVO3 carpet sweeper

=== Carpet Sweepers ===
Carpet sweepers are still a prominent feature in Ewbank's range. The latest models, SPEEDSWEEP and EVO3, offer energy-efficient manual push operation with a high level of pickup.

In 2024, Ewbank launched the MULTISWEEP manual push sweeper, the next evolution of their signature sweeper. The MULTISWEEP is suitable for use on various outdoor and indoor surfaces, making it an essential year-round cleaning companion.

=== Vacuum Cleaners ===
Ewbank's product portfolio now includes both corded and cordless vacuum cleaners.

The MOTION range includes corded cylinder and upright models, with washable filters and accessories to help access hard-to-reach areas of the home.

The AIR family of stick vacuum cleaners offers cordless convenience. The AIRSTORM is Ewbank's most powerful model in the range and comes equipped with a turbo pet brush to make light work of hair and fluff.

More recent additions include the ACTIVE+, which effortlessly converts into a handheld model and is capable of 60 minutes of cleaning on a single charge.

=== Floor Cleaners & Polishers ===
With a selection of reusable pads, Ewbank's floor polishers can clean, buff and shine hard floors to perfection.

=== Carpet & Upholstery Cleaners ===
Having manufactured simple, manual carpet shampooers for a number of years, Ewbank launched the HYDRO range of cleaners in 2020. The HYDROC2, the latest offering in this collection, easily restores carpets and has a detachable spot cleaner for use on upholstery

=== Steam Cleaners & Pressure Washers ===
For powerful sanitising without chemicals, Ewbank launched the STEAMDYNAMO steam cleaner, followed closely by the STEAMDYNAMO+.

As the first expansion into outdoor cleaning, Ewbank's AQUABLAST160 pressure washer enables users to effortlessly blast away dirt and grime from cars, patios, walls and gutters.
