= Anna Sutherland Bissell =

American businesswoman (1846–1934)

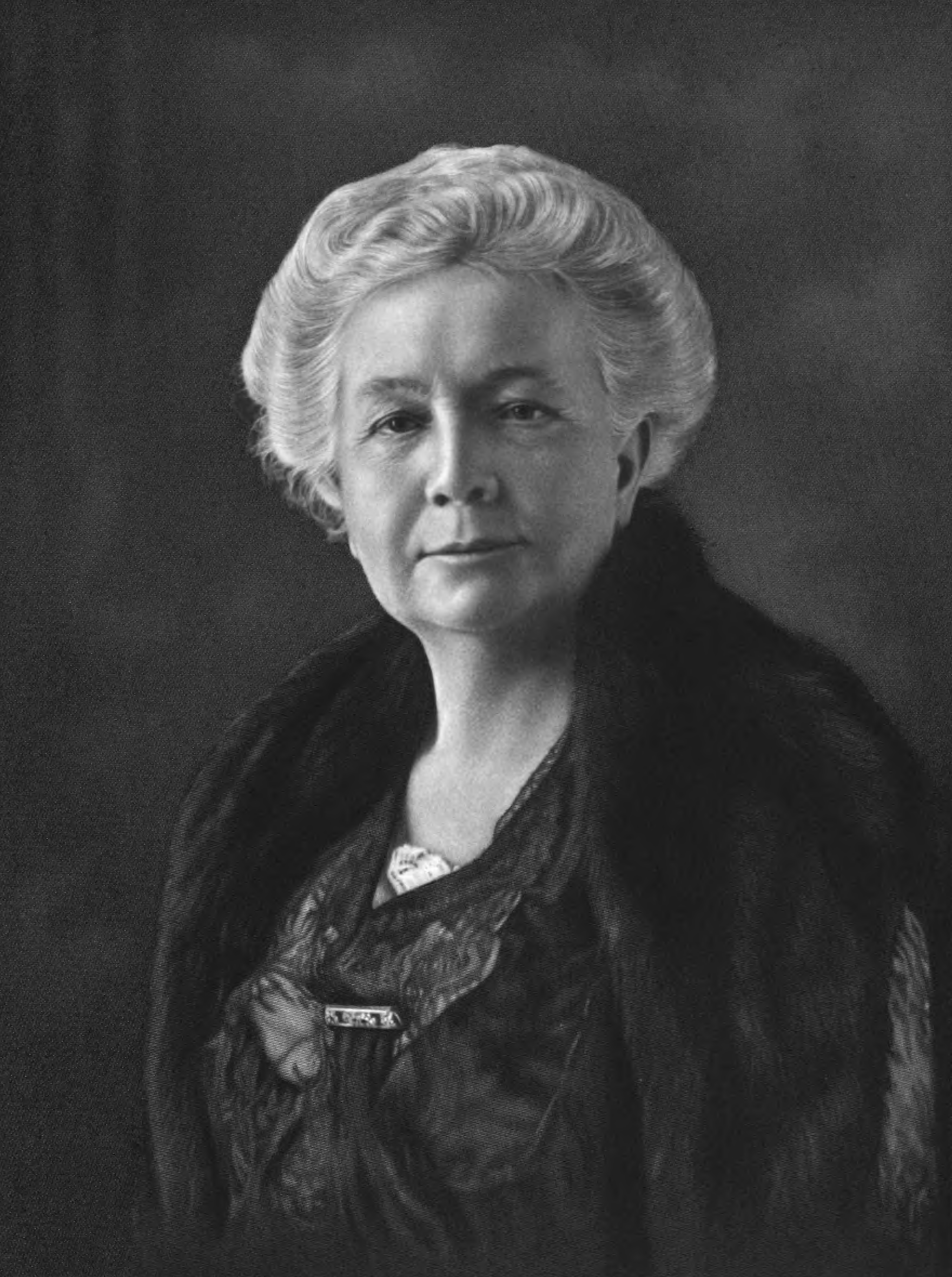
- Born: Anna Sutherland; December 2, 1846; River John, Nova Scotia, Canada
- Died: November 8, 1934 (aged 87); Grand Rapids, Michigan, US
- Occupation: Executive of Bissell
- Known for: First woman CEO in the US
- Spouse: Melville Reuben Bissell
- Children: 5
- Relatives: Anna Bissell McCay (daughter)

Anna Sutherland Bissell (2 December 1846 – 8 November 1934) was a Canadian-American businesswoman who was the first female CEO in the United States. She was CEO of Bissell, known for its carpet sweepers and vacuum cleaners.

== Early life, family and education ==
Anna Bissell was born in River John, Nova Scotia, to William and Eleanor Sutherland. They immigrated to Wisconsin when Anna was a child.

== Career ==
By age 16, Bissell was a schoolteacher.

After Bissell married Melville R. Bissell at age 19, they became a joint partner in their crockery and china business. The Bissell Sweeper website recounts that Mrs. Bissell complained to her husband about sawdust that collected in their carpets and was difficult to remove, whereupon he made great improvements to a new invention called the carpet sweeper. When Bissell's husband invented the Bissell carpet sweeper in 1876, she became its top salesperson, traveling from town to town selling the sweeper.

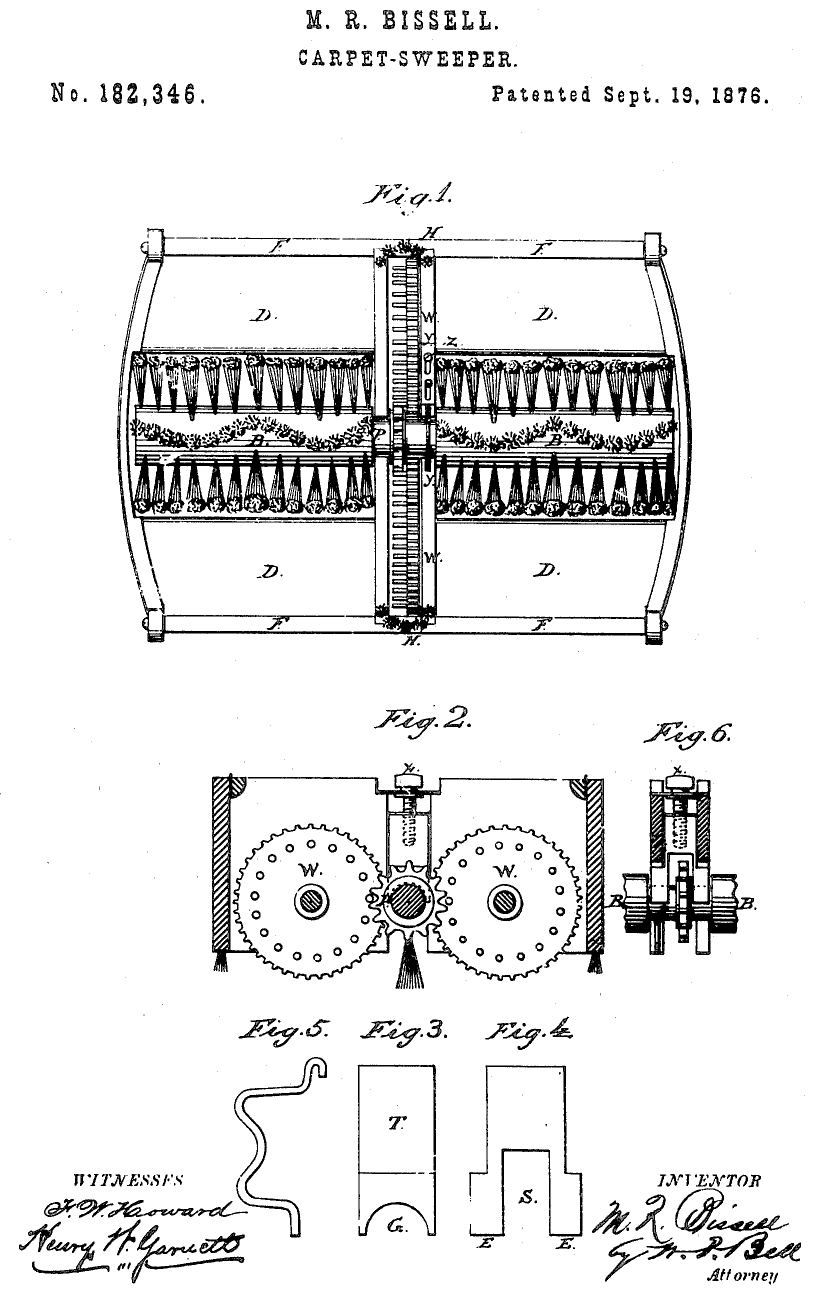
Bissell Carpet Sweeper US Patent 182346

After her husband's death in 1889 and with five children and a grandchild, Bissell took over the business and became the chief executive officer of the Bissell company. She established new guidelines on trademarks and patents and moved Bissell carpet sweepers into the international market. By 1899 it was the world's largest organization of its kind.

In 1919, Bissell also became the chairman of the Bissell company. As president of the corporation and chairman of the board, Bissell introduced progressive labor policies including workman's compensation and pension plans long before these practices were widespread in industry.

It was said of her that she "studied business the way other women of her time studied French." She kept pace with the growing complexities of industrialism and knew every facet of the Bissell production.

== Civic activities ==
Bissell was a charter member of the Ladies Literary Club, a life member of the Women's City Club, and an active member of Zonta International. She served on the board of The Clark Memorial Home and was for years the sole woman member of the National Hardware Men's Association.

Bissell was a generous philanthropist. She was the first woman trustee of the Methodist Episcopal Church and was actively involved in Bissell House, a recreation and training program for Grand Rapids, Michigan youth and immigrant women. She also served on the board of what was to become Blodgett Home for Children.

== Personal life ==
At age 19, Anna Sutherland married Melville Reuben Bissell. They had five children and at least one grandchild. In 1889, Melville Bissell died from pneumonia.

On November 8, 1934, Anna Sutherland Bissell died at age 87 in Grand Rapids, Michigan. Bissell is buried in Oakhill Cemetery in Grand Rapids, Michigan.

== Legacy ==
In July 2016 a seven-foot (2.1 m) statue of Bissell was unveiled; it is located outside the DeVos Place Grand Gallery in Grand Rapids, Michigan. The bronze statue was designed by Ann Hirsch. It was funded by the Peter Secchia family.

A small park on the water in River John, Nova Scotia is dedicated to Bissell.

Her home in Grand Rapids, Michigan, also known as the Bissell House, no longer exists. The site is now occupied by NBC television affiliate station WOOD-TV.

== See also ==
- DeVos Place Convention Center
- Heritage Hill Historic District (Grand Rapids, Michigan)
