= Karla MacFarlane =

Canadian politician

The Honourable Karla MacFarlane ECNS
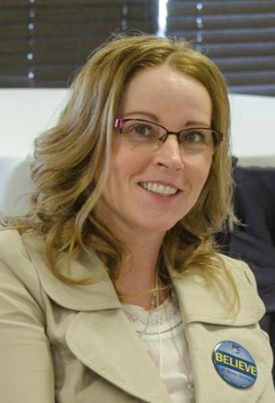
- Karla MacFarlane in 2016

54th Speaker of the House of Assembly of Nova Scotia
- In office October 12, 2023 – April 5, 2024
- Preceded by: Keith Bain
- Succeeded by: Danielle Barkhouse

Leader of the Opposition of Nova Scotia Interim leader of the Progressive Conservative Association of Nova Scotia
- In office January 24, 2018 – October 27, 2018
- Preceded by: Jamie Baillie
- Succeeded by: Tim Houston

Member of the Nova Scotia House of Assembly for Pictou West
- In office October 8, 2013 – April 12, 2024
- Preceded by: Charlie Parker
- Succeeded by: Marco MacLeod

Personal details
- Born: April 29, 1969 (age 57) Three Brooks, Nova Scotia
- Party: Liberal (since 2026); Progressive Conservative (former)

Karla Michelle MacFarlane (born April 29, 1969) is a Canadian politician, who was elected to the Nova Scotia House of Assembly in the 2013 provincial election. As a member of the Progressive Conservative Party of Nova Scotia, she represented the electoral district of Pictou West.

She was re-elected in the 2017 provincial election. MacFarlane was appointed interim leader of the Progressive Conservative party and Leader of the Opposition on January 24, 2018, when her predecessor, Jamie Baillie, was forced to resign due to allegations of inappropriate behaviour. She was succeeded by Tim Houston on October 27, 2018. On August 31, 2021, MacFarlane was made Minister of Community Services as well as Minister Responsible for the Status of Women and the Office of L'nu Affairs in the Tim Houston government. The latter appointment caused backlash among some Nova Scotians as MacFarlane is white as well as the fact that the riding she represents has no First Nations communities. She resigned from cabinet on September 14, 2023, and was elected Nova Scotia's first female Speaker of the House on October 12, 2023.

MacFarlane announced her resignation as Speaker of the House of Assembly on April 5, 2024. She resigned as an MLA one week later on April 12. The provincial by-election to replace her was scheduled for May 21, 2024. She endorsed Becky Druhan in the 2026 Nova Scotia Liberal Party leadership election.

MacFarlane has two children. MacFarlane is a graduate of Husson University in Maine with an associate degree in Business Communications. In 2016, MacFarlane was named "Legislator of the Year" at the non-profit Springtide Collective's Better Politics Awards.

== Electoral record ==
2021 Nova Scotia general election
Party	Candidate	Votes	%	±%
Progressive Conservative	Karla MacFarlane	4,487	63.62	+1.18
Liberal	Mary Wooldridge-Elliott	1,510	21.41	+4.94
New Democratic	Rick Parker	872	12.36	-6.40
Green	Clare Brett	124	1.76	-0.56
Independent	John A. Clark	60	0.85	
Total valid votes		7,053	99.63	
Total rejected ballots		26	0.37	
Turnout		7,079	62.11	
Eligible voters		11,398		
Progressive Conservative hold		Swing		-1.88
Source: Elections Nova Scotia

2017 Nova Scotia general election
Party	Candidate	Votes	%	±%
Progressive Conservative	Karla MacFarlane	4,333	62.44	+22.34
New Democratic	Shawn McNamara	1,302	18.76	-15.53
Liberal	Ben MacLean	1,143	16.47	-9.14
Green	Cecile Vigneault	161	2.32	+2.32
Total valid votes		6,939	100.0	

2013 Nova Scotia general election
Party	Candidate	Votes	%	±%
Progressive Conservative	Karla MacFarlane	3,026	40.10	
New Democratic Party	Charlie Parker	2,588	34.29	
Liberal	Glennie Langille	1,933	25.61	
