= Bissell =

American vacuum company

Bissell Inc.

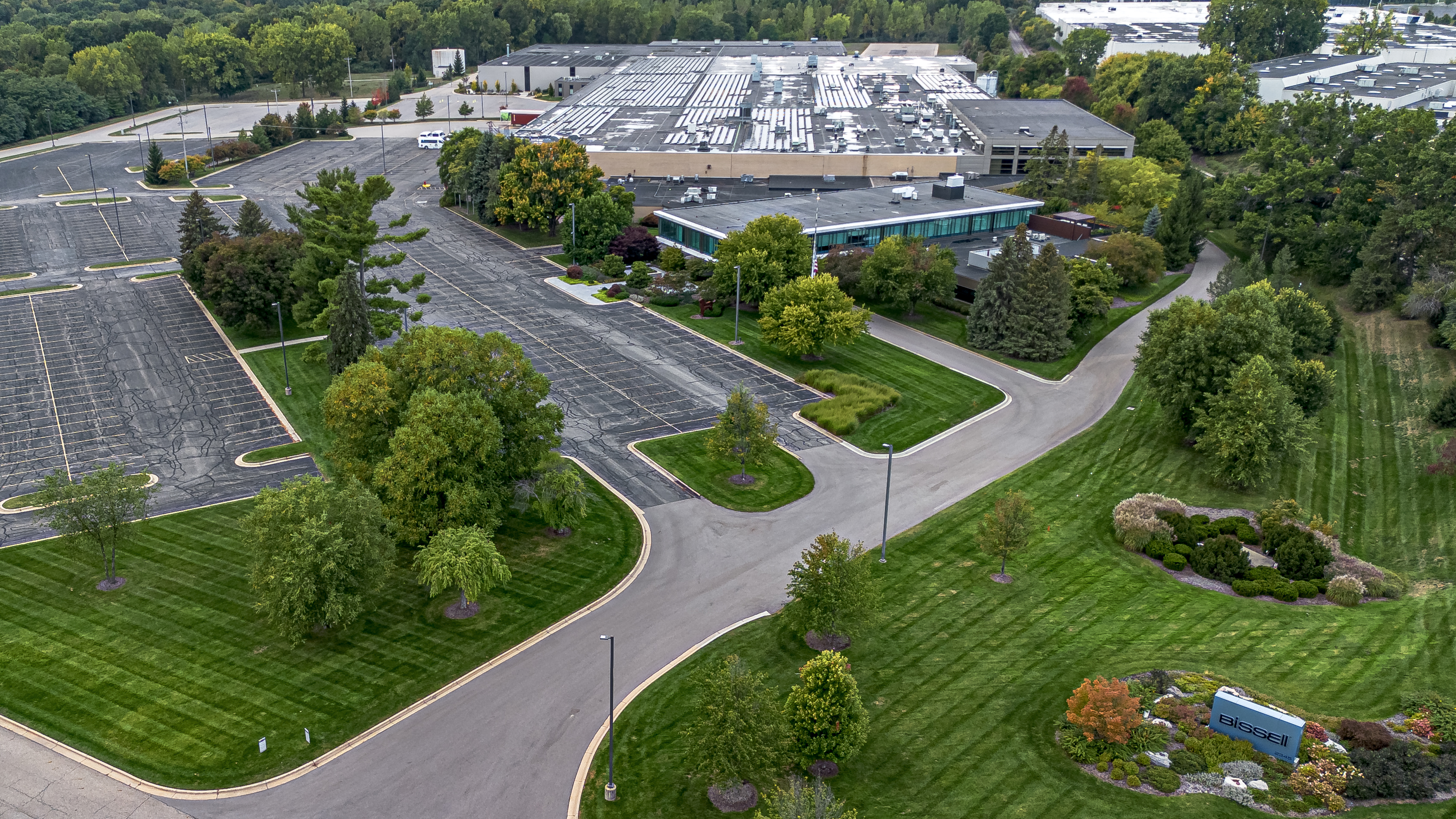
- Headquarters of Bissell
- Type: Private (family owned)
- Industry: Floor care
- Founded: 1876; 150 years ago
- Founder: Melville Bissell
- Headquarters: Walker, Michigan, US
- Area served: Worldwide
- Key people: Mark J. Bissell (President)
- Products: Vacuum cleaners (hand-operated and robotic), carpet cleaners, floor cleaners
- Revenue: $2.1 billion USD
- Owner: Bissell family
- Number of employees: 2,623 (2025)
- Subsidiaries: Bissell big green commercial Sanitaire; Rugdoctor by bissell
- Website: www.bissell.com

Bissell Inc., also known as Bissell Homecare, is an American privately owned vacuum cleaner and floor care product manufacturing corporation headquartered in Walker, Michigan. The company is the number one manufacturer of floor care products in North America in terms of sales, with 20% marketshare.

== History ==
Melville Bissell developed an early carpet sweeping machine to aid in cleaning the crockery shop he and his wife Anna Sutherland Bissell owned and operated. The device was patented as the Bissell Carpet Sweeper in 1876. In 1883, Bissell built the company's first manufacturing plant in Grand Rapids, Michigan. By the 1890s the company had an international presence and was producing 1000 sweepers per day.

Melville Bissell died in 1889 and his wife Anna took over as leader of the company. She served as the company president from 1889 to 1919 and chair of the board from 1919 to 1934.

Over the years the company expanded from manufacturing only mechanical sweepers to producing vacuum cleaners and carpet shampooers.

== Today ==
In 2004, the company acquired a license for $62 million for the Woolite trademark for all carpet and upholstery cleaning formulas. It has also moved into the pet-care industry, manufacturing attachments and solutions designed specifically for cleaning up pet hair and stains. Whereas other competitors saw sales decline by numerous percentage points during the economic downturn, Bissell's sales remained steady. In 2009, they outpaced Hoover to take the number one position for floor-care sales in North America. Their top-selling carpet shampooer is Bissell ProHeat 2x Revolution Pet Pro which is the market leader as of 2020.

It was the title sponsor for the Bissell Pro Cycling Team. Bissell established the Bissell Pet Foundation which receives a donation for every Bissell purchase to save pets and provide grant money and assistance to various animal non-profits in all 50 US states.
