= Helen Creighton =

Canadian folklorist

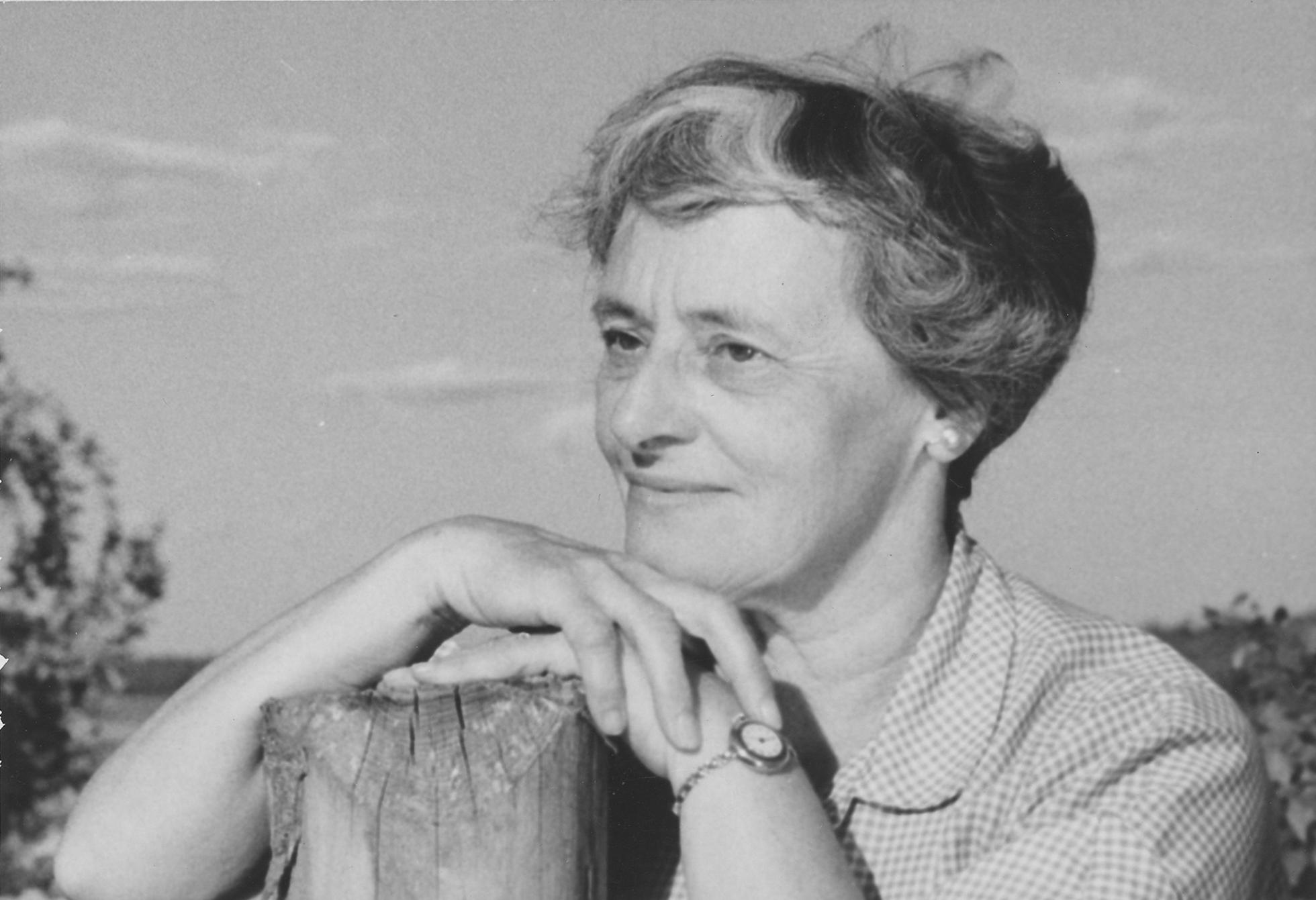
- Born: Mary Helen Creighton; September 5, 1899; Dartmouth, Nova Scotia, Canada
- Died: December 12, 1989 (aged 90); Dartmouth, Nova Scotia, Canada
- Occupations: folklorist, author
- Employer(s): Rockefeller Foundation Canadian Museum of Civilization, CBC
- Known for: Collecting songs and stories in the Maritimes
- Website: archives.novascotia.ca/creighton/

Mary Helen Creighton, CM (September 5, 1899 – December 12, 1989) was a prominent Canadian folklorist. She collected over 4,000 traditional songs, stories, and beliefs in a career that spanned several decades, and she published many books and articles on Nova Scotia folk songs and folklore. She received numerous honorary degrees for her work and was made a Member of the Order of Canada in 1976.

== Early life ==
Born on Portland Street in Dartmouth, Nova Scotia, she developed an early interest in folklore and the supernatural. She had a sister who suffered from a mental disability. Between 1914 and 1916 she attended Halifax Ladies College and earned a junior diploma in music at McGill University in 1915. In 1918, she joined the Royal Flying Corps in Toronto and by 1920, she had returned to Nova Scotia as a paramedic with the Red Cross Caravan. She was dean of women at the University of King's College between 1939 and 1941.

== Song collecting ==
In 1928, Creighton returned to Nova Scotia in search of literary material, and met with Dr. Henry Munro, the Superintendent of Education for the Province of Nova Scotia. Munro showed her a copy of Sea Songs and Ballads from Nova Scotia by W. Roy MacKenzie and suggested Creighton attempt to find more songs. She began to travel around Nova Scotia, collecting songs, tales and customs of Gaelic, English, German, Mi'kmaq, African and Acadian origin. Frequently, she had to walk or sail to remote regions to satisfy her interest, all the while pushing a metre-long melodeon in a wheelbarrow. Among Creighton's many contributions was the discovery of the traditional "Nova Scotia Song", widely called "Farewell to Nova Scotia", which has become a sort of provincial anthem.

Between 1942 and 1946, Creighton received three Rockefeller Foundation fellowships to collect songs in Nova Scotia. The second of these fellowships was used to collect songs with equipment loaned by the Library of Congress. Creighton also made recordings for the Canadian Museum of Civilization from 1947 to 1967.

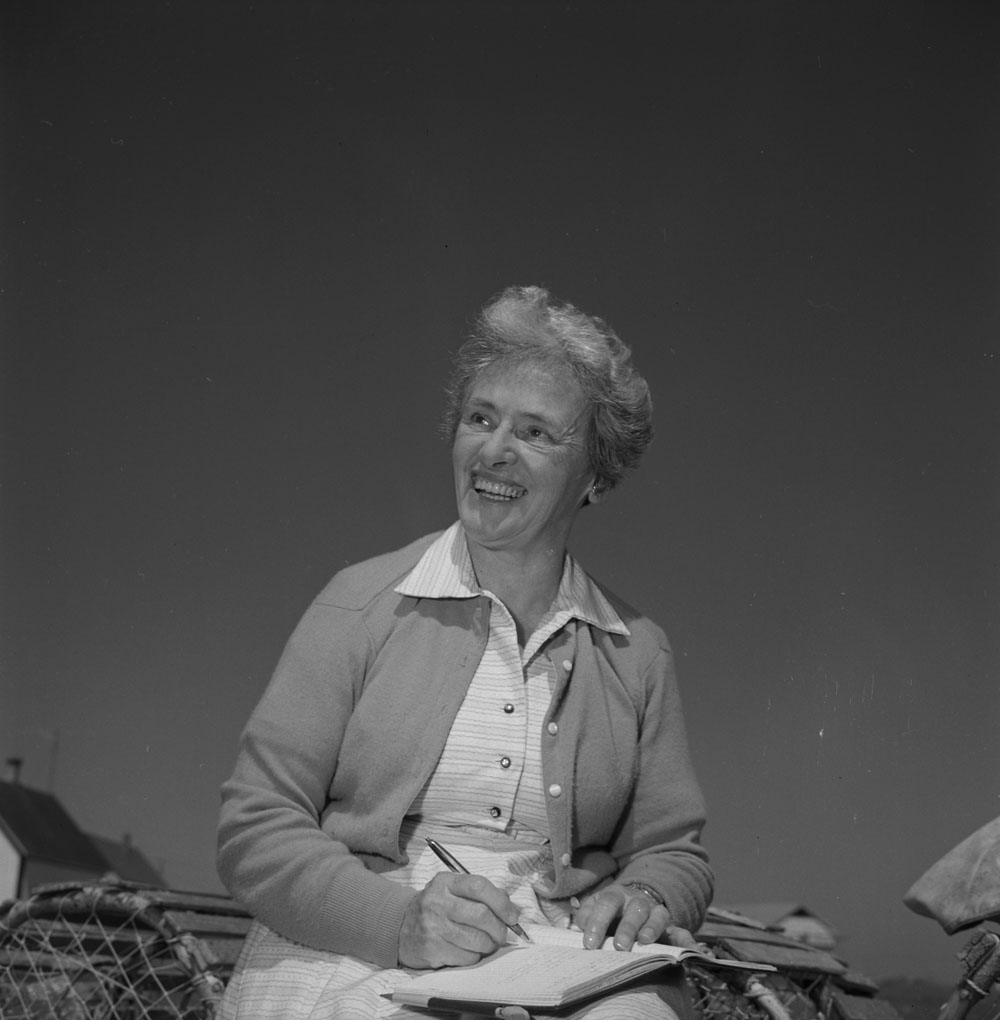
Dr. Creighton in 1959

She made excursions outside of Nova Scotia, notably to New Brunswick from 1954 to 1960 (Folksongs from Southern New Brunswick contains material from that period); however, she preferred not to collect in the places of fellow researchers such as Louise Manny.

Her home, Evergreen House, is a part of the Dartmouth Heritage Museum and is open to the public.

== Folklore and Ghost Stories ==
As she collected songs, Creighton also became interested in the ghost stories and superstition in Nova Scotia and the Maritimes. She presented these stories first in the themed collection of ghost stories Bluenose Ghosts published in 1957 and later in an additional book Bluenose Magic in 1968.

== Criticisms ==
Creighton had little formal training in folklore and song collecting and has been criticized for requiring academics to edit the published collections. While regarded as among the most significant collectors in North America, reviews of Creighton's published volumes have drawn some criticism. Historian Ian MacKay argues that Creighton was a product of her class and social upbringing and that her folk collections were incorporated and co-opted as part of a broader movement that contributed to the commodification of "Scottishness" in Nova Scotian tourism literature in the late 1930s and later that defied class and historical realities. McKay further suggests that Creighton's work was used by the provincial government of Angus L. Macdonald (and by later governments and influential writers) to create a myth of "hardy fisherfolk" and "Nova Scotia rustics" that actually demean, commodify, and mythologize the realities of working-class lived experience in Nova Scotia.

Songs and Ballads from Nova Scotia has been criticized for 'selective editing'. Maritime Folk Songs, a record of nineteen songs from Creighton's collection, was criticized by some reviewers for its selection of songs.

== Awards and recognition ==
The Canadian Songwriters Hall of Fame awarded Helen Creighton the Frank Davies Legacy Award in 2011.

Creighton was named a National Historic Person in 2018.

The East Coast Music Association awards the Dr. Helen Creighton Lifetime Achievement Award annually to Atlantic Canadian musicians in recognition of their contributions to the region's music industry.

== Bibliography ==
- Songs and Ballads from Nova Scotia (1932, republished 1966)
- Folklore of Lunenburg County (1950)
- Traditional Songs from Nova Scotia (1950)
- Bluenose Ghosts (1957, republished 2009)
- Maritime Folk Songs (1962, republished 1972)
- Gaelic Songs in Nova Scotia (1964)
- Bluenose Magic (1968)
- Folksongs from Southern New Brunswick (1971)
- A Life in Folklore (1975)
- Eight Ethnic Songs for Young Children (1977)
- Nine Ethnic songs for Older Children (1977)
- With a Heigh-Heigh-Ho (1986)
- Fleur de Rosier (1989)
