= Bluenose Ghosts =

Book by Helen Creighton on Nova Scotia ghost stories

- First edition
- Author: Helen Creighton
- Language: English
- Genre: Folklore
- Publisher: Ryerson Press, Toronto
- Publication date: October 1957
- Publication place: Canada
- Media type: Print (hardback & paperback)
- Pages: xiii, 280
- Preceded by: Traditional Songs From Nova Scotia
- Followed by: Maritime Folksongs

Bluenose Ghosts is a book which presents a series of Nova Scotia ghost stories collected by Canadian folklorist Helen Creighton over a period of 28 years, first published in 1957.

== Summary ==
On a song-collecting foray seeking Mr. and Mrs. Enos Hartlan in the community of Hartlan's point on the eastern side of the Halifax Harbour, Helen took notice of Mrs. Hartlan's interest with a deserted house near their property. She explained to Helen "That's our Ghost House," created from the wood of old shipwrecks, and haunted with strange knocks and footsteps. This tale became the inspiration for over two decades of ghost story collecting in the Maritimes, one of her first published explorations outside of the chronicling of folksongs, for which she is best known.

Creighton not only recounts the experiences of others, but her own encounters with the supernatural, from her experiences with forerunners such as death knocks, to her own helpful spirits and premonitions. She attempts to write without judgement of the stories, admitting that some may be a result of imagination, but also that there are those with unquestionable authenticity. She does not compare them with similar stories from other parts of the world, explaining that "this book is devoted to the thinking of our own people."

=== Chapters ===
==== Forerunners ====
Creighton shares her personal encounters of Forerunners, supernatural signs that warn humans of impending deaths. Many tales of Forerunners often involve knocks on the door, church bells ringing when no one else can hear them, an owl hooting during the day, or seeing own apparitions of yourself.

==== Leave 'Em Lay ====
The second chapter collects tales of the supernatural being disturbed by humans and the actions of the living, for instance removing jewelry or bones from a coffin. And so, the troubled ghosts will uproar and cause disturbances to the living.

==== Ghosts Guard Buried Treasure ====
Helen Creighton shares her personal encounters of ghosts who guard treasure. She states that a person will sporadically die as they stand guard while others bury the treasure, and so naturally, their ghosts will be protective of these treasures.

==== Foresight and Hindsight ====
Similarly to the Forerunners, which are associated with the sounds that occurs before an approaching event, the Foresights deal with the double visions and individuals who have the gift of being double-sighted, as well as having the ability to see a death ahead of time.

==== Devils and Angels ====
The first section of this chapter focuses on numerous interactions with the devil, including dancing and making deals. The second part focuses on stories of angelic visitations, which Creighton explains are less frequent.

==== Phantom Ships and Sea Mysteries ====
This chapter discusses the various myths of phantom ships, particularly the infamous privateer ship, Teazer. Creighton reveals that someone once told her "if [a person] sees the Teazer, [he/she] will die within a year." She also reveals that she has two reports of sea serpents: one in the inland of Cranberry Lake, and another at Victoria Beach.

==== Ghosts Helpful, Harmful, and Headless ====
In this chapter, Creighton discusses the various kinds of ghost encounters that she has heard about. She groups them into three types of experiences: helpful ghosts like one that saved a man from Dartmouth's life, harmful ghosts like one that tried to pull Captain David Hayden offshore, and headless ghosts that do not interfere with humans.

==== So Many Wandering Women ====
In this chapter, Creighton discusses the different case of reported female ghost that wander around, especially Lady Grey, who was a headless ghost that would disappear when others got close to her or wanted to interact with her. Creighton also mentions the female ghosts during this time liked to wander around and taunt humans.

==== There and Not There ====
Creighton recounts the many instances in Nova Scotia of things having been seen which, upon investigation, were not there at all. Mentioned are Lile a Frisee, Ingramport, Spectacle Island, and Peggy Cove.

==== Ghosts as Animals and Lights ====
Creighton collects tales of ghost animals, mostly in the form of dogs, pigs, and horses. She also details encounters with spirit lights, with the suggestion that these mysterious lights may be the result of phosphorus rising from swampland, or the work of mischievous local boys trying to scare other residents.

==== Haunted Houses and Poltergeists ====
Creighton recounts tales of haunted houses, in which supernatural events such as apparitions or household items moving themselves independently occurred. In some cases she visited the haunted houses directly to speak with their occupants.

== Cultural themes ==
Nova Scotia's rocky shoreline has been the cause of many shipwrecks throughout the province's colonial history, spanning to the present day. Unpredictable weather, some of the busiest shipping routes in the world, the rocky coastline, and its strategic location during wartimes has meant the demise of hundreds of vessels along the province's coast. Tales of buried treasure, restless spirits of deceased sailors and pirates, and phantom ships are intrinsically linked with this history. Creighton's stories explore this link between the supernatural and tragedy, making note of ties to significant historical events such as the Acadian Expulsion.

== Cultural influence ==
Bluenose Ghosts quickly became a best seller reaching a far larger audience than Creighton's previous work collecting and publishing folk songs. The book was notable for giving attention to women's stories, respecting the voice of the storytellers and for providing some context for the setting of storytellers. The book made Creighton into a speaker in demand at gatherings such as the Canadian Author Association and social events around Nova Scotia. Creighton followed the pattern with a similar book in 1968, Bluenose Magic. The stories she collected became regional classics and inspired many similar storytellers and ghost tours.

=== The Bluenose Ghosts Festival ===
The Bluenose Ghosts Festival, which was inspired by the books, highlights the cultural heritage of the Halifax Regional Municipality and continues to collect stories of Downtown Dartmouth. The Festival offers school programs and activities, cemetery tours, haunted houses, and other related events. Students in Saint Mary's University's History Department are offered unique research projects as well as curriculum aligned educational programs and fine art projects for elementary and junior high students. In the present day, stories are still being collected in Dartmouth, Nova Scotia in honour of Helen Creighton's extensive work on the subject.

=== CBC Film ===
In 1966, Helen Creighton began to concentrate on editing, publishing, and publicizing the fruits of her work. She appeared in a CBC film, titled Lady of Legends, which focused on the stories she had printed in Bluenose Ghosts. This proved to be good publicity for her novel.

== Criticism ==
Bluenose Ghosts and Bluenose Magic have been criticized by the Canadian cultural historian Ian McKay for exaggerating the extent of occult belief in Nova Scotia and creating a false picture of a people united by superstition. McKay also claims that Micmac and African Nova Scotian stories in the book relegated these cultures to the periphery and promoted racial stereotypes. Richard S. Tallman published an article in the Acadiensis which called Bluenose Ghosts "one of the better such collections published in North America." Tallman called her personal approach which validated belief in the legends refreshing, but characterized her as a parapsychologist rather than a folklorist, due her lack of professional academic training and popularizing slant. Some critics also saw the tales collected in Bluenose Ghosts and its sequel Bluenose Magic as survivalism and vulgarization A review in Resource Links was more complimentary, citing, among other elements, Creighton's attention to preserving the original voice of the Nova Scotians storytellers, and the book's ability to demonstrate "how the supernatural is as much a part of Nova Scotian life as is the sea."

== See also ==
- Literature of Nova Scotia
