= W. Roy MacKenzie =

Canadian folklorist and author

- Born: William Roy MacKenzie; February 14, 1883; River John, Pictou County, Nova Scotia
- Died: September 1957 (aged 73–74); River John, Pictou County, Nova Scotia
- Education: Dalhousie University (B.A., M.A.); Harvard University (M.A., PhD.); Dalhousie University (Honorary LLD)
- Occupations: folklorist, author
- Known for: Collecting songs and stories in Nova Scotia

William Roy MacKenzie (commonly known as W. Roy MacKenzie) was a Canadian folklorist and writer who collected songs and ballads in Nova Scotia in the early 20th century.

== Influence of Francis Child ==
While at Harvard, MacKenzie was among members of an increasingly prominent group of English professors influenced by the work of Francis James Child, an American folklorist who collected what is now known as the Child Ballads.

== Song collecting in Nova Scotia ==
MacKenzie was the first of several people to collect songs in Nova Scotia, and his Ballads and Sea Songs remains an important collection of the province's traditional music. In his introduction to MacKenzie's 1909 article in the Journal of American Folklore, Kittredge noted that,

"The conditions in Nova Scotia have been such as to render the evidence which [MacKenzie] has collected highly typical. Several processes which we are often obliged to infer or to conjecture with respect to the course of tradition through long periods of time, have there gone on with such rapidity that their history may be followed by means of the recollection of living persons."

His work influenced Helen Creighton, one of Canada's most prolific song collectors. MacKenzie and Creighton are the most prominent collectors of Nova Scotia traditional songs, but others, such as Louise Manny, collected songs in the province as well.
