= Melville Reuben Bissell =

American entrepreneur

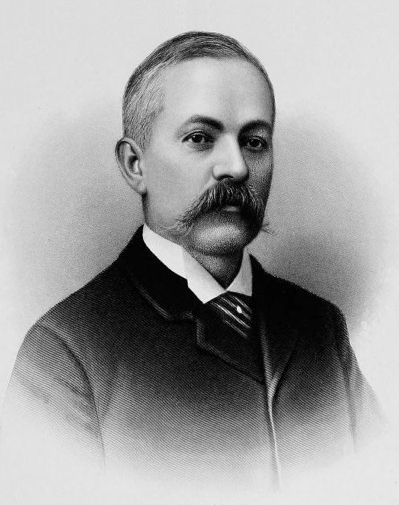
- Image of Bissell from History of the City of Grand Rapids
- Born: September 25, 1843; Hartwick, New York, United States
- Died: March 15, 1889 (aged 45); Grand Rapids, Michigan, United States
- Occupations: Inventor businessman
- Known for: invented the modern carpet sweeper
- Spouse: Anna Sutherland Bissell

Melville Reuben Bissell (September 25, 1843 – March 15, 1889) was an American entrepreneur who invented improvements on the modern carpet sweeper. The Bissell corporation is named after him.

== Life and career ==
Bissell was born in Hartwick, New York, and grew up in Berlin, Wisconsin. As a young adult, he opened a grocery store in 1862 with his father, Alpheus, in Kalamazoo, Michigan, selling it in 1869 and opening a crockery and glassware store in Grand Rapids, Michigan, in 1870. He made money manufacturing crockery and investing in real estate.

In 1876, after using a Welcome carpet sweeper, Bissell began to study how to design a better sweeper, with more reliable mechanisms. Bissell patented a sweeper with a central brush, rubber wheels, and other improvements. He later bought out the Welcome Carpet Sweeper Company.

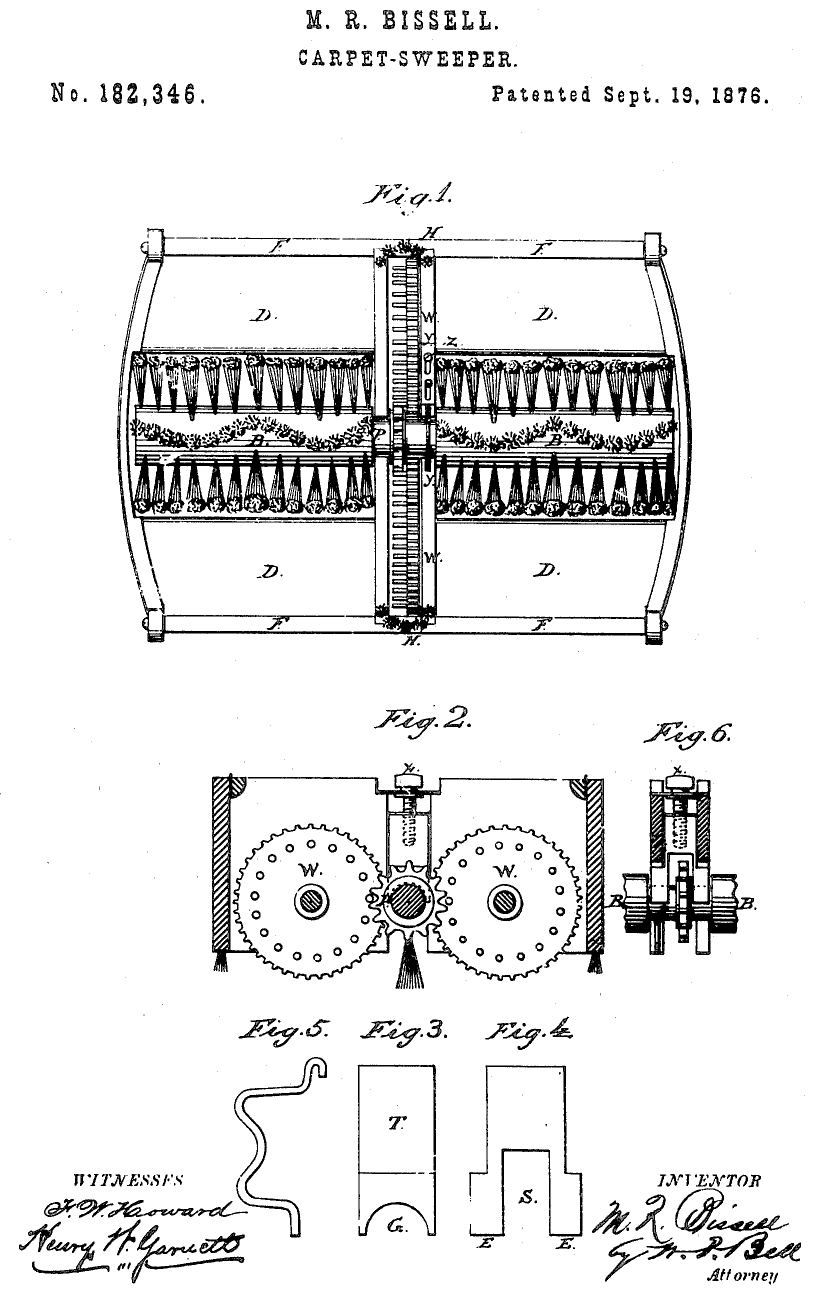
Bissell Carpet Sweeper US Patent 182346

A fire in 1884 destroyed his first factory, and Bissell had only $14,000 insurance coverage on a $100,000 loss. But with the value of his patents he was soon able to obtain the needed resources to rebuild. The factory was not only rebuilt, but over time multiple additions were added to the building.

Following his death from pneumonia in 1889 in Grand Rapids, his wife, Anna Bissell, took control of the company, becoming America's first female corporate chief executive officer.

== Personal life ==
In 1869 Bissell married Anna (Annie) Sutherland of River John, Pictou, NS, Canada. The couple were parents of a daughter, Doetelle, and three sons.
