= Carpet sweeper =

Type of mechanical device used to clean carpets in the home

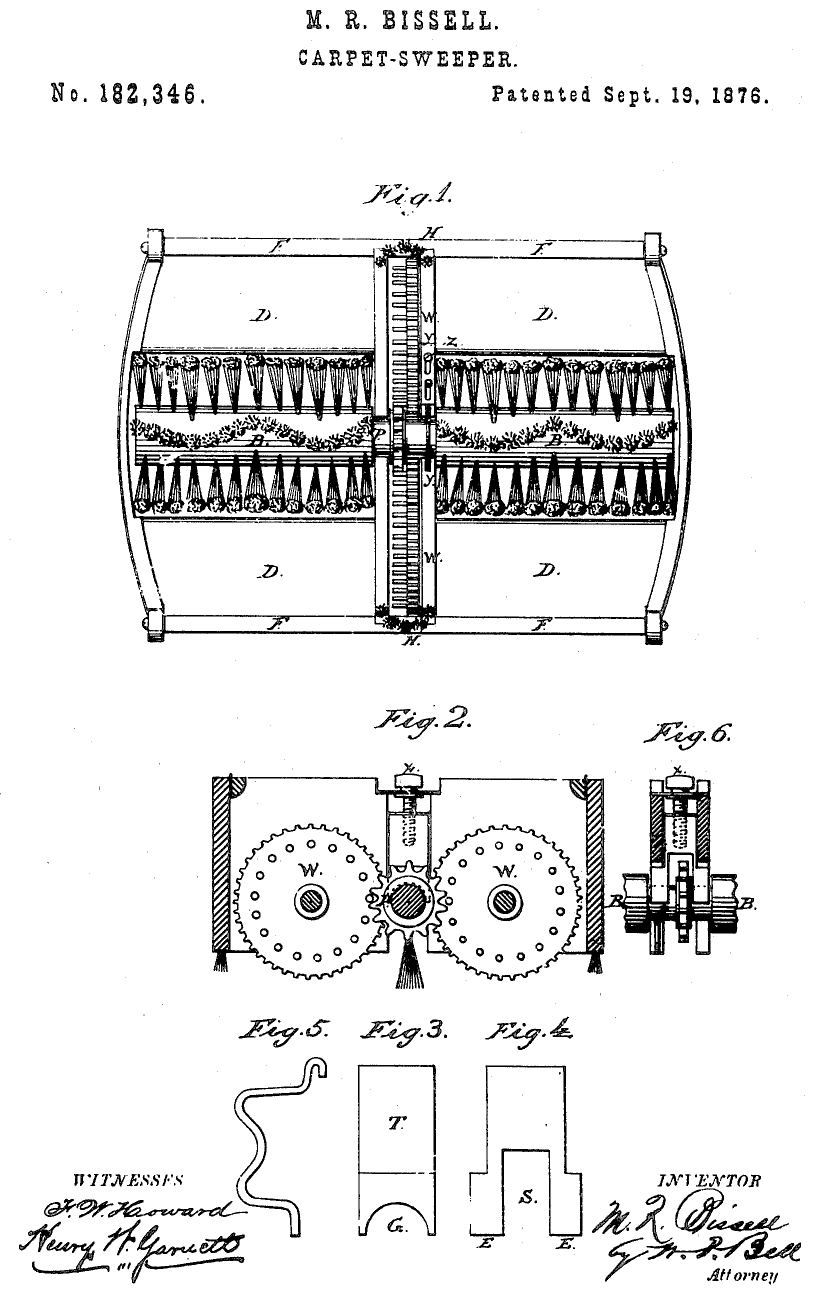
Illustration from the Bissell's 1876 patent

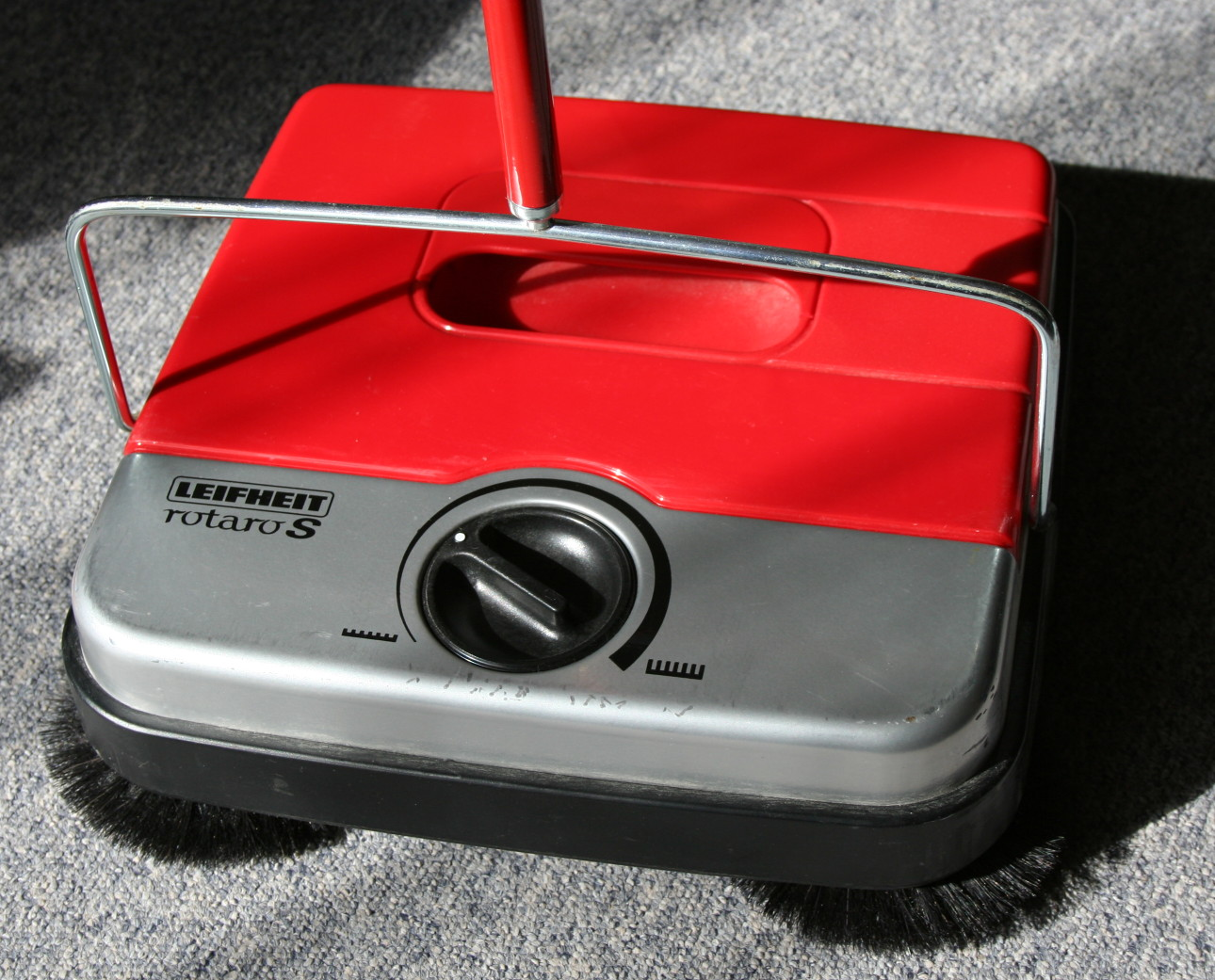
A rotaro S carpet sweeper

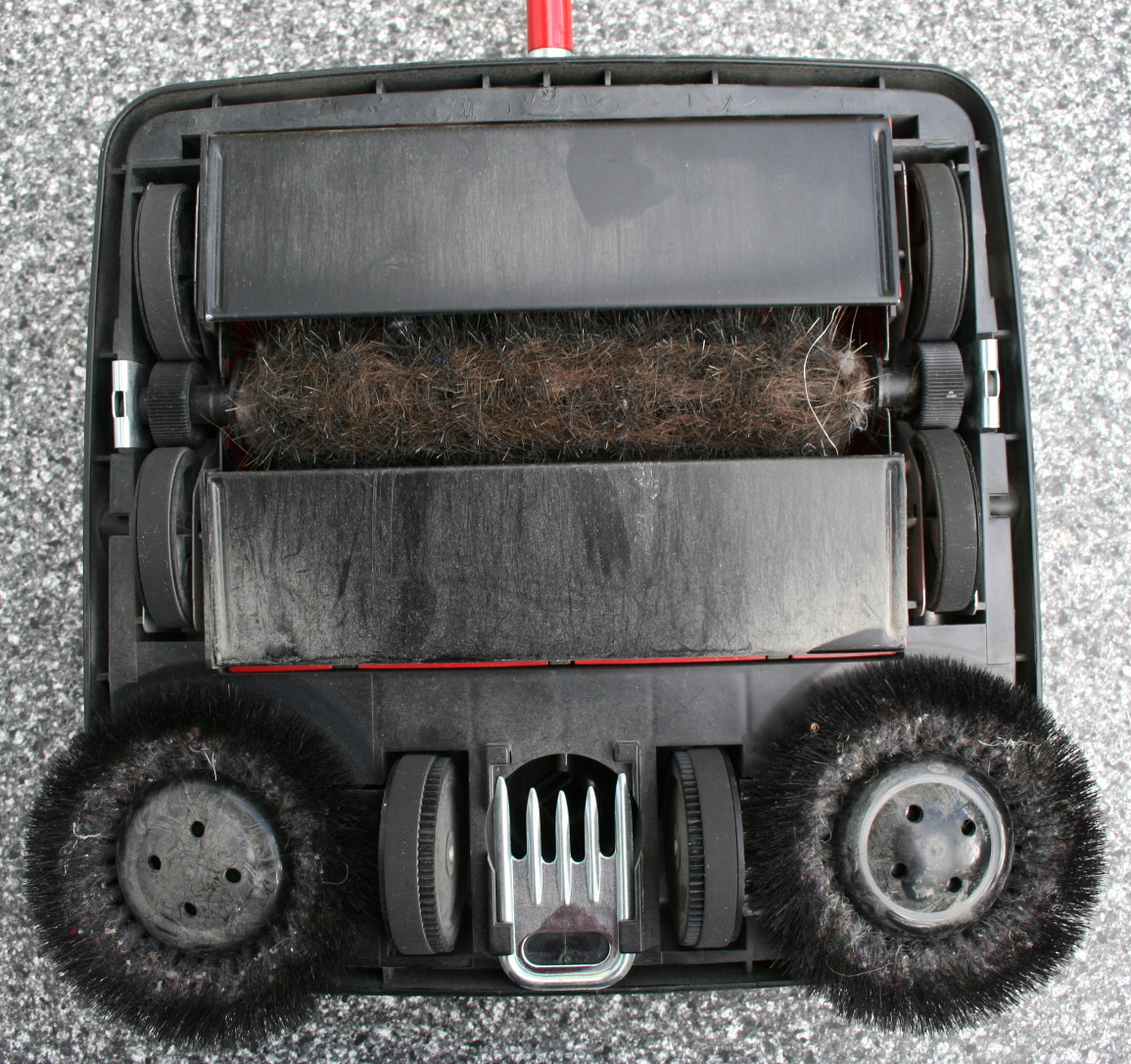
Bottom view of rotaro S showing two brushes, a roller brush, and a removable metal comb for cleaning the brushes

A carpet sweeper is a mechanical device for the cleaning of carpets. They were popular before the introduction of the vacuum cleaner and have been largely superseded by them. However, they continue to be used in many home and commercial applications because they are lightweight and quiet, enabling users to quickly clean small messes up from the floor without disturbing patrons, patients, babies and pets, and because they do not require electricity to operate.

== Operation ==
A carpet sweeper typically consists of a small box. The base of the box has wheels and brushes, connected by a belt or gears or rollers. There is also a container for dirt. The arrangement is such that, when pushed along a floor, the rollers/wheels turn and force the brushes to rotate. The brushes sweep dirt and dust from the floor into the container. Carpet sweepers frequently have a height adjustment that enables them to work on different lengths of carpet, or bare floors. The sweeper usually has a long handle so that it can be pushed without bending over.

== Design ==
The design was patented by Melville R. Bissell of Grand Rapids, Michigan, United States, in 1876. Bissell began selling carpet sweepers in 1883. They became popular in the UK after the first Ewbank model went on sale in 1889. New powered versions were designed at the beginning of the 21st century with rechargeable batteries and an electric motor to spin the rollers and brushes.

== Modern usage ==
Carpet sweepers are still available commercially. In addition, their legacy lives on in floor cleaning robots that have limited suction power and rely on sweeping to collect larger bits of debris from the floor. While some research models of robotic vacuums only rely on vacuum motors, models on the market such as Roomba invariably combine suction and sweeping.

== In popular culture ==
A very early appearance in film occurs in the 1914 Charlie Chaplin film Laughing Gas, where Chaplin uses a sweeper to clean the waiting-room floor of a dentist.
