= Marco MacLeod =

Canadian politician

The Honourable Marco MacLeod ECNS MLA

Member of the Nova Scotia House of Assembly for Pictou West
- Incumbent
- Assumed office May 21, 2024
- Preceded by: Karla MacFarlane

Personal details
- Born: November 20, 1988 (age 37) New Glasgow, Nova Scotia
- Party: Progressive Conservative
- Occupation: Small Business Owner

Marco MacLeod (born November 20, 1988) is a Canadian politician. He was elected to the Nova Scotia House of Assembly as a Progressive Conservative in the May 2024 Pictou West provincial by-election. He was re-elected in the November 2024 Nova Scotia general election.

MacLeod is a small business owner and farmer from Scotsburn. He owns a small custom lumber mill. He graduated from Pictou Academy.

== Controversies ==
=== Past music recordings ===
In August 2026, media reports revealed that MacLeod had previously recorded rap songs between 2009 and 2013 under the moniker "Meadowville", prior to entering politics. Following scrutiny and criticism from community organizations regarding misogynistic and explicit language in songs such as "George Jones", the PC caucus clarified that the recordings were made over a decade earlier and were not autobiographical. MacLeod issued a public apology accepting responsibility for the lyrics, and the songs were subsequently removed from streaming platforms.

== Electoral record ==
2024 Nova Scotia general election: Pictou West
Party	Candidate	Votes	%	±%
Progressive Conservative	Marco MacLeod	4,325	74.08	+1.60
Liberal	Mary Wooldridge-Elliott	778	13.33	+3.78
New Democratic	Carol Ferguson	620	10.62	-5.92
Green	Clare Brett	115	1.97	+0.54
Total valid votes		5,838		
Total rejected ballots		30		
Turnout		5,869	47.74	
Eligible voters		12,293		
Progressive Conservative hold		Swing		
Source: Elections Nova Scotia

Nova Scotia provincial by-election, May 21, 2024 Resignation of Karla MacFarlane
Party	Candidate	Votes	%	±%	Expenditures
Progressive Conservative	Marco MacLeod	4,159	72.48	+8.86	$47,956
New Democratic	Melinda MacKenzie	949	16.54	+4.18	$38,663
Liberal	Mary Wooldridge-Elliott	548	9.55	-11.86	$15,865
Green	Clare Brett	82	1.43	-0.33	–
Total valid votes/Expense limit		5,738	99.29		
Total rejected ballots		43	0.74		
Turnout		5,781	47.73	-13.71	
Eligible voters		12,112			
Progressive Conservative hold		Swing		+2.34	
Source: Elections Nova Scotia
