= River John =

Coordinates: 44°22′2.1″N 64°28′47.1″W

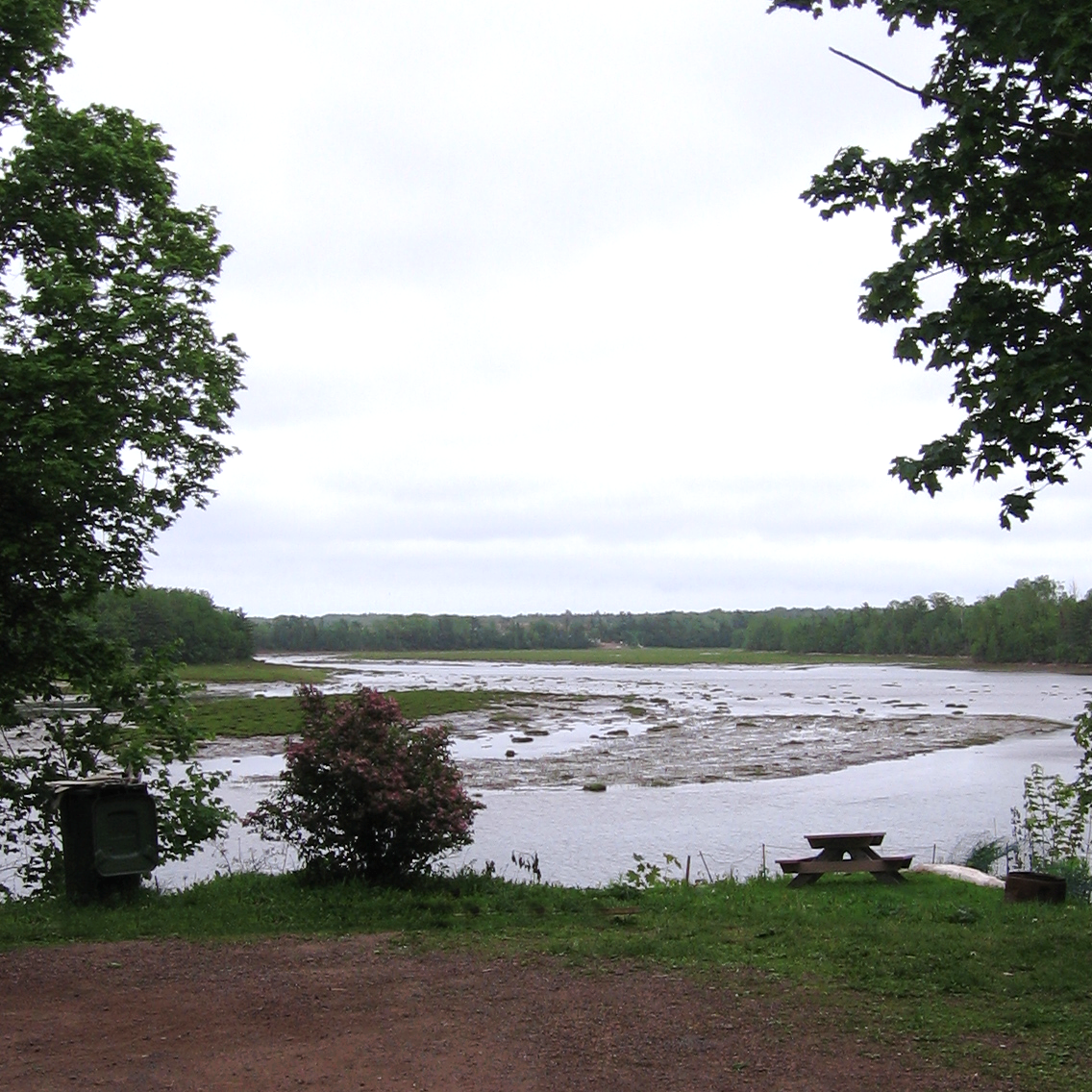
- River John at low tide

Location
- Country: Canada
- Province: Nova Scotia

Physical characteristics
- Mouth
  - location: Northumberland Strait
  - elevation: sea level
- Basin size: 1,117 km^{2} (431 sq mi)

River John is a river in Nova Scotia. Draining the extreme western part of Pictou County, it flows into Amet Sound on the Northumberland Strait at River John, a village which takes its name from the river. The Miꞌkmaq name is Kajeboogwek ("flowing through desert or solitary place"). An early name was Deception River. Its present name is believed to derive from Rivière Jaune, an Acadian name, though it may also derive from nearby Cap Jean (now Cape John). DesBarres called it River John in his Atlantic Neptune.

Permanent settlement began in the late eighteenth century. In the nineteenth century, the river was an important scene of wooden ship building. In 1884, the largest ship ever built in Pictou County, the 1,687-ton Warrior was launched by the Kitchin yard, while rival Archibald MacKenzie launched the 1,574-ton Caldera that same year.

Communities situated on the lower reaches of the river include River John, Marshville and Welsford (formerly River John Village). The upper reaches in the Cobequid Hills began to be settled in the early nineteenth century at West Branch River John, Diamond, Loganville, and Dalhousie Settlement. According to estimates by the Province of Nova Scotia, in 2011 there were 6,661 people resident within the River John watershed (i.e., all land draining into Amet Sound).

The River John is tidal for part of its length.

== See also ==
- List of rivers of Nova Scotia
- History of shipbuilding in River John.
