= Municipality of Pictou County =

Rural municipality in Nova Scotia, Canada

The Municipality of Pictou County is a county municipality in Nova Scotia, Canada. It provides local government to about 21,000 rural residents of Pictou County, but excludes the towns of New Glasgow, Stellarton, Pictou, Westville and Trenton that are administered by their own town councils.

== Council ==
The Municipality is sub-divided into 12 wards, each represented by one councillor. The council is headed by a warden and deputy warden who are chosen by ballot by the council members.

The Chief Administrative Officer is responsible for all staff, provides guidance and advise to the council, ensuring that it operates within all regulations, and executes council's decisions.

The Municipal Administration Building is on the outskirts of the town of Pictou.

== Infrastructure ==
The Public Works department provides street lighting, water supply and waste water disposal in a number of communities throughout the Municipality. It is responsible for snow ploughing of municipally owned streets and sidewalks.
