= Beacon Hill =

Beacon Hill may refer to:

== Places ==
=== Canada ===
- Beacon Hill, Ottawa, Ontario, a neighbourhood
- Beacon Hill Park, a park in Victoria, British Columbia
- Beacon Hill, Saskatchewan, an unincorporated community
- Beacon Hill, Montreal, a neighbourhood in Beaconsfield, Quebec

=== United Kingdom ===
==== England ====
- Beacon Hill, Buckinghamshire, a village in Buckinghamshire
- Beacon Hill, Frodsham, Frodsham, Cheshire
- Beacon Hill or Fell, or Penrith Beacon, Penrith, Cumbria
- Beacon Hill, Paignton, the highest point in the unitary authority of Torbay, Devon
- Beacon Hill transmitting station, radio and television transmitters located at Beacon Hill, Marldon, Devon
- Beacon Hill, Dorset, in the hinterland of Poole, Dorset
- Beacon Hill, East Sussex, a Local Nature Reserve in Brighton
- Beacon Hill, Burghclere, Hampshire, a hill fort, Hampshire
- Beacon Hill, Warnford, Hampshire
- Beacon Hill, Lancashire, the location of Jubilee Tower overlooking Darwen, Lancashire
- Beacon Hill, Leicestershire, a country park in Leicestershire
- Beacon Hill, Lincolnshire in the Lincolnshire Wolds, Lincolnshire
- Beacon Hill, Norfolk, the highest point in Norfolk
- Beacon Hill, Colkirk, Norfolk, a high point in mid Norfolk
- Beacon Hill, Wollaston, Northamptonshire
- Beacon Hill, Morpeth, Northumberland
- Beacon Hill, Surrey, a settlement near Hindhead, Surrey
- Beacon Hill, Rottingdean, East Sussex
- Beacon Hill, West Sussex near East Harting, West Sussex
- Beacon Hill, Sedgley, known as the Sedgley Beacon, the second-highest point in the West Midlands
- Beacon Hill, Walsall, known as Barr Beacon, West Midlands
- Beacon Hill, Halifax, West Yorkshire
- Beacon Hill, Cranborne Chase, a hill on Cranborne Chase, one of two Beacon Hills in Wiltshire
- Beacon Hill, Salisbury Plain, a hill on Salisbury Plain, one of two Beacon Hills in Wiltshire
- Beacon Hill, one of the Lickey Hills in Worcestershire
- Beacon Hill, Great Totham, highest point in Essex

==== Wales ====
- Beacon Hill, Monmouthshire, near Monmouth near the Welsh-English border, Monmouthshire
- Beacon Hill, Powys, a 547-metre-high (1,795 ft) hill near Knighton near the Welsh-English border, Powys

=== United States ===
==== Communities ====
- Beacon Hill, Boston, a historic neighborhood in Boston, Massachusetts
  - Metonymy for the Massachusetts General Court (state legislature), which meets there
- Beacon Hill, New Jersey, an unincorporated area within Marlboro Township, New Jersey
- Beacon Hill, Seattle, Washington, a hill and neighborhood in Seattle, Washington
- Beacon Hill, Cowlitz County, Washington, a census-designated place

==== Hills ====
- Beacon Hill (California), in Norco
- Beacon Hill (Branford, Connecticut), the southernmost summit of the Metacomet Ridge

=== Other places ===
- Beacon Hill (Antarctica), a hill in Graham Land, Antarctica
- Beacon Hill, New South Wales, a suburb of Sydney, Australia
- Beacon Hill (Hong Kong), a hill in the Kowloon Tong area, Hong Kong
- Beacon Hill, the site of the former coastguard station in Dalkey, a suburb of Dublin, Ireland

== Schools ==
- Beacon Hill School (disambiguation)

== Transportation ==
- Beacon Hill (train), a defunct daily rail service from Boston, Massachusetts, to New Haven, Connecticut, U.S.
- Beacon Hill station (Sound Transit), a Link light rail station located in Seattle, Washington, U.S.

== Other uses ==
- Beacon Hill (TV series), a short-lived 1975 American drama set in the Boston neighborhood
- Beacon Hill (web series), a 2014 American drama web series
- Beacon Hill, a stage in the video game Need for Speed: Underground 2
- Beacon Hills, a fictitious town where MTV's television series Teen Wolf is set

== See also ==
- Beacon, an intentionally conspicuous device designed to attract attention to a specific location
- List of peaks named Signal, a mountain suited to sending and receiving visual signals
- Beacon Fell (disambiguation)
- Signal Hill (disambiguation)
- Signal Mountain (disambiguation)
