= Signal Mountain =

Signal Mountain may refer to:

- Signal Mountain (geography), several mountains or peaks named Signal
  - Signal Mountain (Alberta), a mountain in the Maligne Range in Alberta, Canada
- Signal Mountain Wilderness, a protected wilderness area in Maricopa County, Arizona
- Mount Wilkinson or Signal Mountain, a mountain near Atlanta, Georgia
- Signal Mountain, Tennessee, a town near Chattanooga
  - Signal Mountain Middle High School
- Signal Mountain (Wyoming), a mountain in Grand Teton National Park
- Signal Mountain (Vermont), a mountain in Caledonia County, Vermont

== See also ==
- Mount Signal, California, a community in the Imperial Valley
- Signal Hill (disambiguation)
- Signal Mountain Lodge, Grand Teton National Park, Wyoming
- Signal Mountain Trail, Grand Teton National Park, Wyoming
