= List of peaks named Signal =

A signal mountain or signal peak is a mountain suited to sending and receiving visual signals, either from its topographic prominence and isolation or from being located where signal communications are most needed. For example, Tennessee's Signal Mountain was used by Native Americans to send fire and smoke signals across the Tennessee Valley. It was also used by the Union Army as a visual communications station during the American Civil War. Mount Lassic in California has low prominence but is also known as Signal Peak due to the heliograph station that was located on this peak around 1900. And the highest peak in the Pine Valley Range, Utah's Signal Peak, is "supposedly named because of its use in World War II when beacons were placed on the mountain to guide airplanes at night."

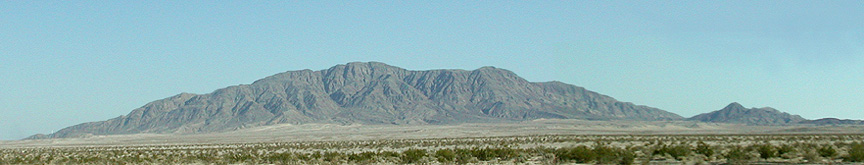
Mount Signal, viewed from the Imperial Valley, California

== Mountains ==
Peak	Photo	Nation	County, Province/State	Coordinates	Elevation	Prominence	Notes
Signal Mountain (Alberta)		Canada	Alberta	52°51′34″N 117°58′01″W	2312 m 7,585 ft	92 m 302 ft	
El Centinela known as Mount Signal in the U.S.		Mexico	Baja California	32°28′27″N 116°53′49″W	750 m 2,461 ft		The mountain, in northern Baja California, dominates over California's Imperial Valley area, including over the town of Mount Signal, California, which is named for it.
Signal Mountain (Shelby County, Alabama)		United States	Shelby County, Alabama	33°23′49″N 86°34′51″W	460 m 1,509 ft	268 m 879 ft	
Signal Mountain (Valdez-Cordova, Alaska)		United States	Valdez-Cordova Census Area, Alaska	60°17′04″N 146°38′17″W	417 m 1,368 ft		
Signal Mountain (Maricopa County, Arizona)		United States	Maricopa County, Arizona	33°12′28″N 112°57′16″W	665 m 2,182 ft	324 m 1,063 ft	
Signal Mountain (Pinal County, Arizona)		United States	Pinal County, Arizona	33°20′40″N 110°59′57″W	1488 m 4,882 ft	1060 m 3,478 ft	
Signal Peak (Humboldt County, California)		United States	Humboldt County, California	40°20′02″N 123°33′16″W	1783 m 5,850 ft	84 m 276 ft	Also known as Mount Lassic, in the Coast Range. Its "Signal Peak" name derives from the heliograph station that was located on this peak around 1900.
Signal Peak (Orange County, California)		United States	Orange County, California	33°36′22″N 117°48′43″W	355 m 1,165 ft	242 m 794 ft	A major two-way radio site for Orange County, and a visual reporting checkpoint for aircraft inbound to land at John Wayne Airport.
Signal Peak (Tahoe National Forest)		United States	Tahoe National Forest, California	39°20′21″N 120°32′8″W	2391 m 7,844 ft		
Vinings Mountain formerly known as Signal Mountain, also known as Mount Wilkinson		United States	Cobb County, Georgia (U.S. state)	33°52′07″N 84°28′00″W	299 m 981 ft		A low mountain from whose top the church spires of Atlanta could be seen during the American Civil War
Signal Mountain (Coos County, New Hampshire)		United States	Coos County, New Hampshire	44°45′41″N 71°13′39″W	824 m 2,703 ft	269 m 883 ft	
Signal Mountain (Grafton County, New Hampshire)		United States	Grafton County, New Hampshire	44°17′17″N 71°58′32″W	703 m 2,306 ft	432 m 1,417 ft	
Signal Mountain (Hamilton County, Tennessee)		United States	Hamilton County, Tennessee	35°07′17″N 85°22′30″W	319 m 1,047 ft		
Signal Mountain (Scott County, Tennessee)		United States	Scott County, Tennessee	36°17′00″N 84°28′04″W	887 m 2,910 ft		
Guadalupe Peak		United States	Culberson County, Texas	31°53′29″N 104°51′39″W	2667 m 8,750 ft	923 m 3,028 ft	Also known as Signal Peak, the highest natural point in the state of Texas
Signal Peak (Texas)		United States	Howard County, Texas	32°12′05″N 101°18′45″W	808 m 2,651 ft	107 m 351 ft	A singular peak within the Signal Mountains of Howard County, Texas.
Signal Peak (Utah)		United States	Washington County, Utah	37°19′11″N 113°29′30″W	3159 m 10,364 ft	1367 m 4,485 ft	Highest peak in Pine Valley Mountains
Signal Mountain (Vermont)		United States	Caledonia County, Vermont	44°12′20″N 72°19′29″W	1013 m 3,323 ft	650 m 2,133 ft	#35 of New England Fifty Finest, Knox Mountain on USGS topological map
Signal Mountain (Virginia)		United States	Fauquier County, Virginia	38°52′53″N 77°42′11″W	417 m 1,368 ft	240 m 787 ft	
Signal Mountain (Wyoming)		United States	Teton County, Wyoming	43°50′56″N 110°34′02″W	2354 m 7,723 ft		An isolated volcanic summit with sweeping views of the geologically distinct Teton Range.
Signal Hill		United States	Williamson County, Texas	30°36′48″N 97°52′06″W			
Signal Hill		United States	Hays County, Texas	30°11′24″N 97°57′16″W			

== See also ==
- Signal Hill (disambiguation)
- Lookout Mountain (disambiguation)
- Beacon Hill
