= Maritime Museum of British Columbia =

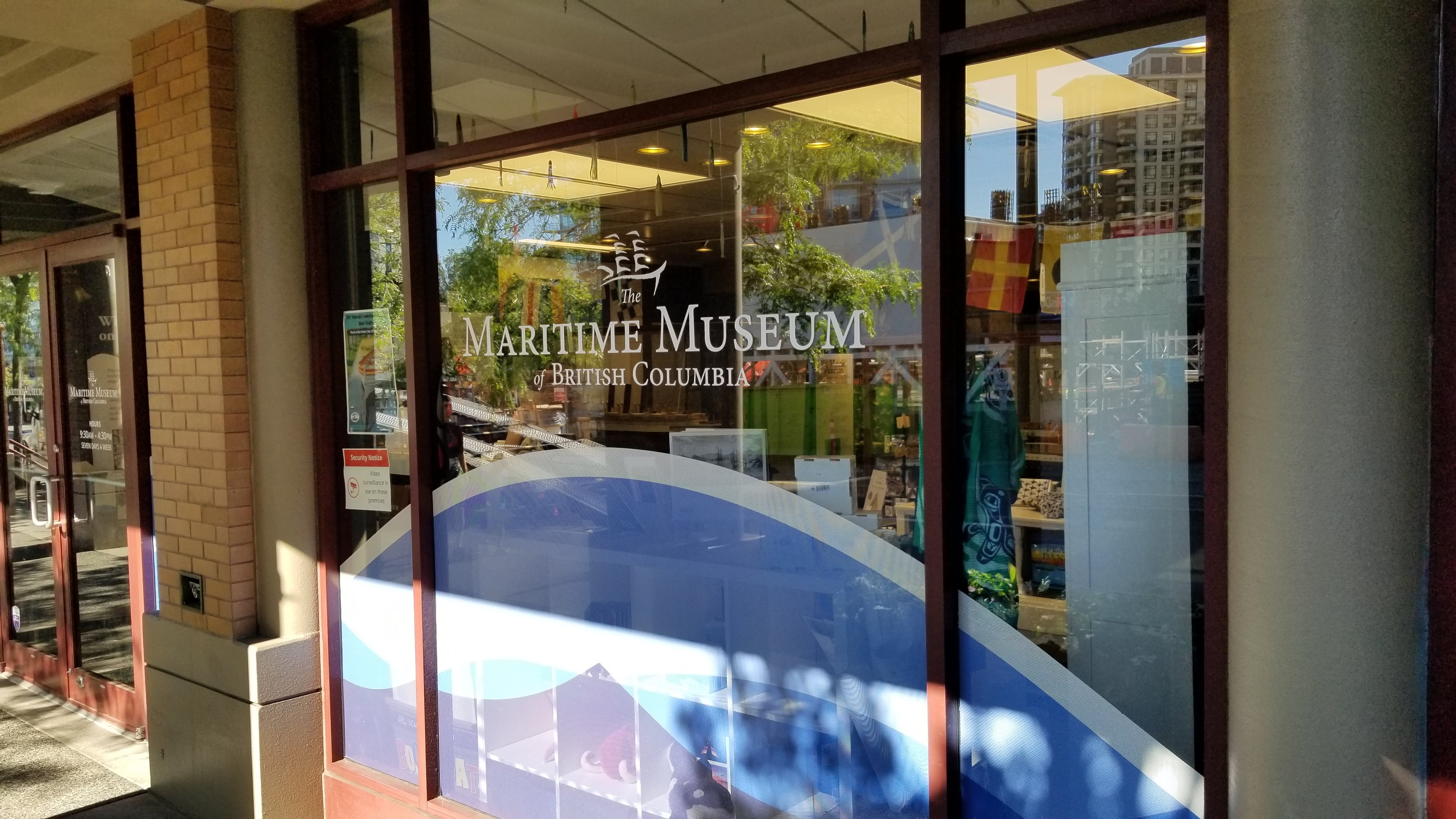
- Maritime Museum of BC in July, 2024
- Location: 744 Douglas Street; Victoria, British Columbia; V8W 3M6
- Coordinates: 48.42183569224045°N 123.36635743303346°W
- Type: Maritime museum
- Website: mmbc.bc.ca

The Maritime Museum of British Columbia (MMBC) is a museum in Victoria, British Columbia, Canada, that engages people with the maritime culture and history of the Pacific Northwest through rotating exhibits, educational and community-based programs, research services, and more.

In 2015 the MMBC completed its relocation from its long-term home in Bastion Square to a Society Office in Nootka Court at 634 Humboldt St., Victoria, with its collections being stored off-site in a climate-controlled facility. In August 2021, the MMBC moved to its current interim location at 744 Douglas St., with space to house exhibits that display artefacts from the collection, public research space, a gift shop, and staff offices.

== History ==
The Maritime Museum of BC was opened by naval officers in 1955 at Signal Hill in Esquimalt, British Columbia and later went through name changes. The Maritime Museum of British Columbia Society was registered in 1957 as a non-profit society and would follow a broader Pacific coastal heritage mandate. The Museum moved in 1963-64 to 28 Bastion Square in downtown Victoria. The corresponding Maritime Museum of British Columbia Foundation was established sixteen years later to develop long-term support for the Society.

In 1981 a separate group founded the CFB Esquimalt Naval & Military Museum, which continues at Naden on Canadian Forces Base Esquimalt.

The Museum’s Bastion Square venue closed in October 2014 because the provincially owned courthouse built in 1889 required seismic upgrading and other structural work. Packing and moving the collection required more than a year, and the Society completed its move to the new location on Humboldt Street in July 2015. In August 2021, the MMBC moved to its current interim Douglas Street location. Selected items from the collection are displayed along with travelling exhibits.

== Collection and exhibits ==
The rich collection of some 35,000 artefacts includes 800 models of ships and items related to the maritime heritage of BC. There is a reference library of 6,000 volumes including a collection of 200 titles of historical significance, an archival collection of records of local ship-owning and shipbuilding firms, logbooks, naval records, ships' plans of 1800 vessels, maps and charts, an art collection, and approximately 36,000 photographs. The 744 Douglas Street location is open to the public as of September 2021. Public outreach such as educational programming and talks are offered. The exhibit space is used to interpret selected items from the permanent collection and travelling exhibits. The bulk of the collection is housed in climate-controlled space in the northern part of Victoria. The reference room is used by researchers wishing to consult the library and archives, and volunteers and staff are available to assist with reference inquiries.

The collection also includes three historic small vessels: Tilikum, the 38-foot (11.6m) modified aboriginal cedar canoe sailed westabout from Vancouver Island starting in 1901 to London, UK; Trekka, a 20.5-foot (6.2m) sailboat sailed around the world by her Victoria builder starting in 1954 - at the time the smallest yacht to have circumnavigated the globe; and Dorothy, a locally built 1897 fantail cutter. Dorothy's refit project has been completed, and she is actively sailing.

== Affiliations ==
The Maritime Museum of BC is affiliated with the B.C. Museums Association, the Canadian Museums Association, the Virtual Museum of Canada and Canadian Heritage Information Network. The organization is under the patronage of the Hon. Janet Austin, Lieutenant Governor of British Columbia.

== See also ==
- Vancouver Maritime Museum, Vancouver, British Columbia
- International Congress of Maritime Museums (ICMM)
