= Signalberg =

Signalberg may refer to:

== Germany ==
- Bastorfer Signalberg, a hill in the Kühlung hills of Mecklenburg-Vorpommern
- Signalberg (Damme), a hill in the Damme Hills of Lower Saxony
- Signalberg, a hill in the Upper Palatine Forest of Bavaria

== Other places ==
- Signalberg, a hill near Neman, Kaliningrad Oblast, Russia
- Signalberg or Diedrichsberg, a hill in the borough of Qingdao, Shandong Province, China
- Montseny Massif (from the Latin: Monte Signum − "Signal Hill"), range in Catalonia, Spain
- Signal Hill (Cape Town), a hill near Cape Town, South Africa

== See also ==
- Signal Hill (disambiguation)
- Signal Mountain (disambiguation)
