= Beacon Hill School =

Beacon Hill School may refer to:

== United Kingdom ==
- Beacon Hill Community School, a secondary school in Aspatria, Cumbria, UK
- Beacon Hill School, founded by Bertrand Russell and Dora Russell on the West Sussex Downs, from 1927 to 1943
- Beacon Hill School, a special or alternative school in North Tyneside, UK
- Beacon Hill Primary School, Kesgrave, Suffolk, UK
- Unity Academy Blackpool, formerly Beacon Hill School, in the Warbreck area of Blackpool, Lancashire, UK
- Matthew Humberstone School, formerly Beacon Hill Secondary School, a comprehensive school in Cleethorpes, North East Lincolnshire, UK

== Other places ==
- Beacon Hill School, Hong Kong, an international primary school
- Beacon Hill Secondary School, in the Western Cape, South Africa
- Beacon Hill High School, a former high school in Beacon Hill, Sydney, Australia
- El Centro de la Raza, an educational, cultural, and social service agency, at the former Beacon Hill Elementary School, Seattle, Washington, U.S.

== See also ==
- Beacon Hill (disambiguation)
