= Beacon Hill, Hampshire =

Beacon Hill, Hampshire in England may refer to:

- Beacon Hill, Burghclere, Hampshire
- Beacon Hill, Warnford, Hampshire

== See also ==
- Beacon Hill (disambiguation)
