= Signal Hill Elementary School =

Signal Hill Elementary School is the name for the following schools:

- Signal Hill Elementary School (Signal Hill, California) - Signal Hill, California
- Signal Hill Elementary School (Belleville, Illinois) - Belleville, Illinois
- Signal Hill Elementary School (Dix Hills, New York) - Dix Hills, New York
- Signal Hill Elementary School (Prince William County, Virginia) - Prince William County, Virginia
- Signal Hill Elementary School (Pemberton, British Columbia) - Pemberton, British Columbia

== Schools with similar names ==
- Signal Hill School (Voorhees, New Jersey) - Voorhees, New Jersey
- Signal Mountain Middle School - Signal Mountain, Tennessee
- Signal Hill Secondary Comprehensive School - Signal Hill Scarborough, Tobago, Trinidad and Tobago

== See also ==
- Signal Hill (disambiguation)
