= Robert William Thomson =

Scottish businessman and inventor

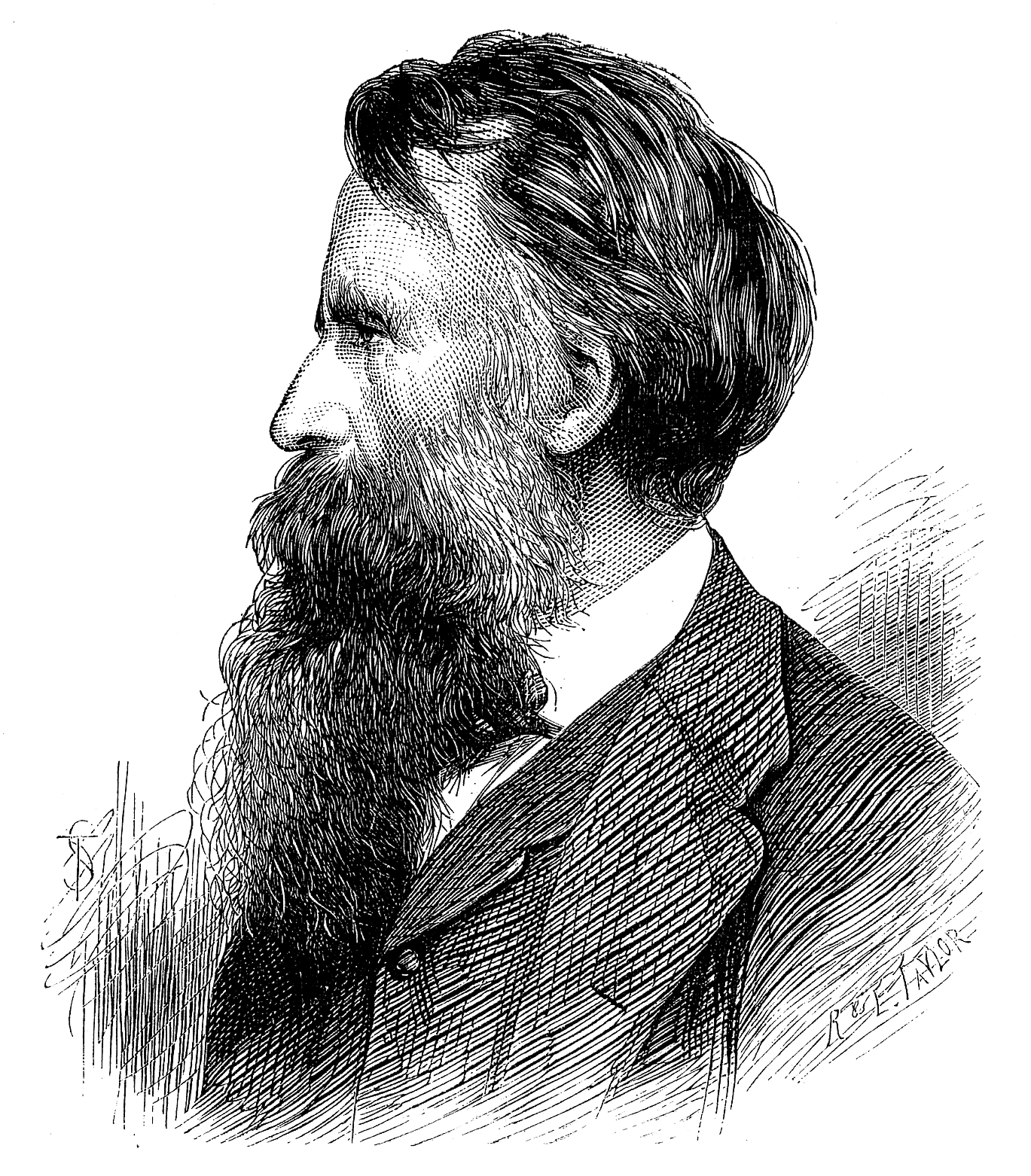
- Illustration of Thomson for The Illustrated London News, 29 March 1873.
- Born: 29 June 1822; Stonehaven, Scotland, UK
- Died: 8 March 1873 (age 50); Edinburgh, Scotland, UK
- Burial place: Dean Cemetery, Edinburgh
- Spouse: Clara Hertz
- Children: 4, including Courtauld and Elspeth

Robert William Thomson PRSSA FRSE (29 June 1822 – 8 March 1873) was a Scottish inventor who invented the refillable fountain pen and the pneumatic tyre.

== Life ==
He was born on 29 June 1822 in Stonehaven in the northeast of Scotland, He was baptised into the Church of Scotland on 26 July 1822. Robert was the eleventh of twelve children of a local woolen mill owner. His family wished him to study for the ministry, but Robert refused, one reason being his inability to master Latin. Robert left school at the age of 14 and went to live with an uncle in Charleston, United States, where he was apprenticed to a merchant. Two years later he returned home and taught himself chemistry, electricity and astronomy with the help of a local weaver who had knowledge of mathematics.

Robert's father gave him a workshop, and by the time he was 17 years old he had rebuilt his mother's washing mangle so that the wet linen could be passed through the rollers in either direction, and had completed the first working model of his elliptic rotary steam engine which he perfected in later life. He served an engineering apprenticeship in Aberdeen and Dundee before joining a civil engineering company in Glasgow. He then went to work for an Edinburgh firm of civil engineers where he devised a new method of detonating explosive charges by the use of electricity, thus greatly reducing the loss of lives in mines throughout the world.

Thomson next worked as a railway engineer and supervised the blasting of chalk cliffs near Dover for the South Eastern Railway. Soon he set up his own railway consultancy business and proposed the line for the Eastern Counties Railway which was accepted by Parliament and eventually developed.

Thomson's pneumatic tyre from US patent, 1847

Thomson was 23 years old when he patented his pneumatic tyre in 1845. He was granted a patent in France in 1846 and in the US in 1847. His tyre consisted of a hollow belt of India-rubber inflated with air so that the wheels presented "a cushion of air to the ground, rail or track on which they run". This elastic belt of rubberized canvas was enclosed within a strong outer casing of leather which was bolted to the wheel. Thomson's "Aerial Wheels" were demonstrated in London's Regent's Park in March 1847 and were fitted to several horse-drawn carriages; one set was said to have run on them for 1200 miles. However, the technology was immature, the tyres were expensive and they were not a commercial success. (Note: The only market was carriages, which used wooden wheels which flexed as they rotated. Larger wheels provided a better ride, as did thinner felloes made of laminated bentwood. Fifty years later, motor vehicles were heavier and went faster than wooden wheels could flex. Small-wheel safety bicycles were another market.)

In 1849 he invented a self-filling mechanism for the fountain pen.

Thomson's solid rubber tyre and shoe for the driving wheels of a road locomotive, 1873

In 1867 he patented the solid but flexible India-rubber tyre, for use on steam road locomotives. This revolutionized heavy road transport and led to the use of steam-hauled road trains in areas which lacked railways.

In 1863 he was elected a Fellow of the Royal Society of Edinburgh, his proposer being Charles Piazzi Smyth. From 1869 to 1871 he served as president of the Royal Scottish Society of Arts.

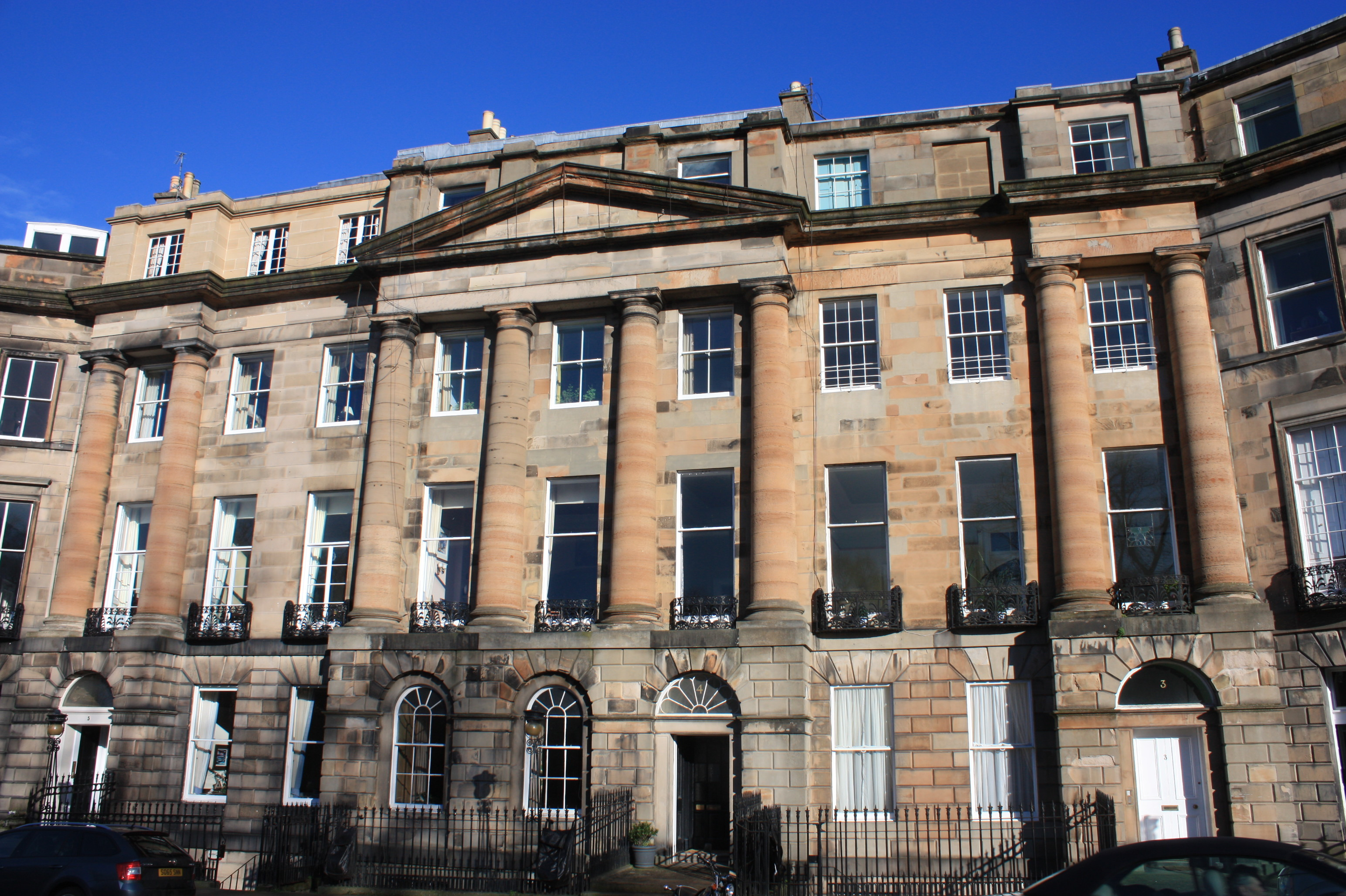
Thomson's house (right) at 3 Moray Place, Edinburgh

He amassed a large sum from his inventions and lived in a large townhouse at 3 Moray Place on the Moray Estate in west Edinburgh.

He died at home in Edinburgh on 8 March 1873 aged 50. He was buried in Dean Cemetery in west Edinburgh on the path leading from the centre of the cemetery to the south-west.

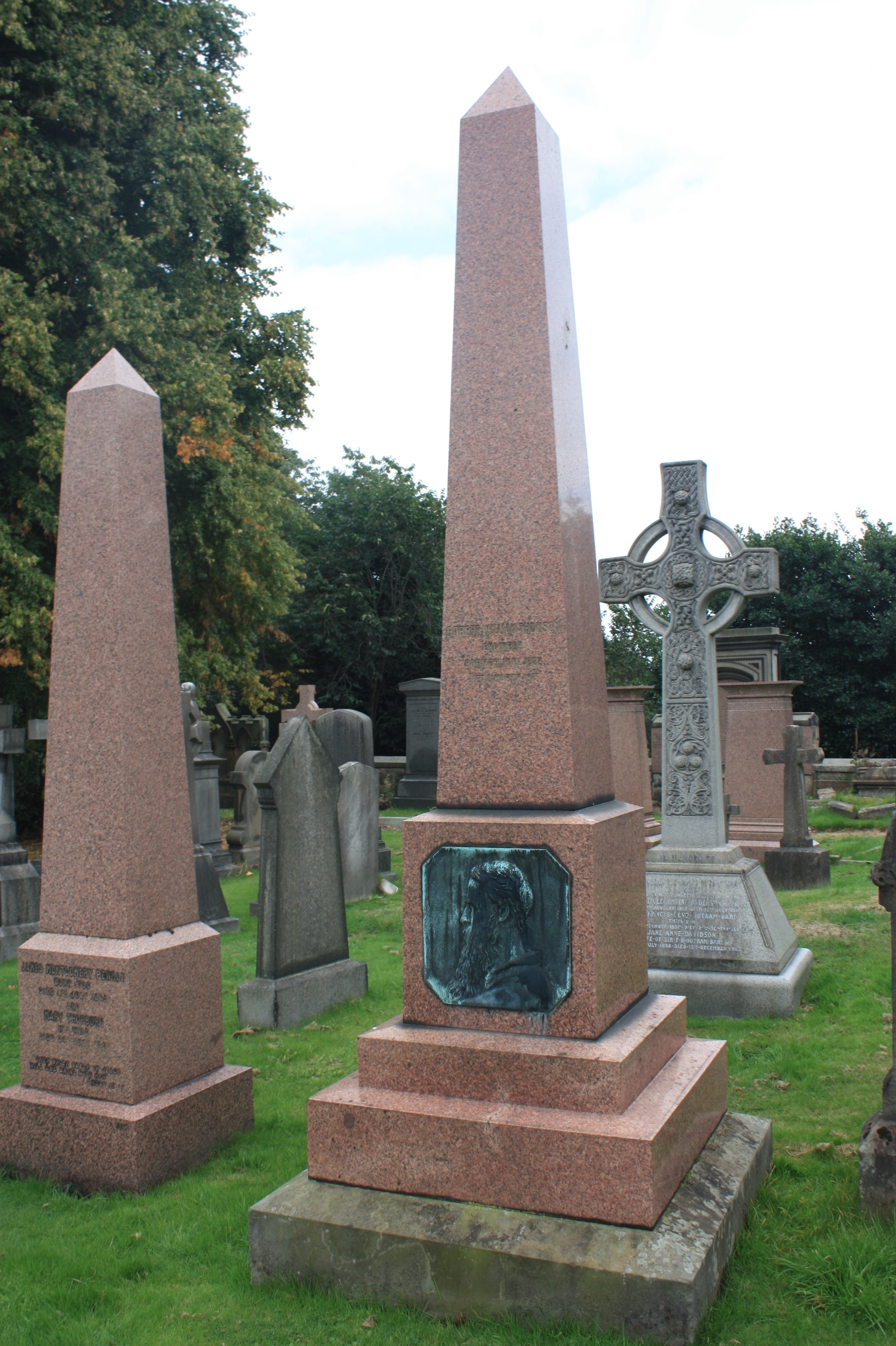
The grave of Robert William Thomson, Dean Cemetery, Edinburgh

== Family ==
Thomson married Clara Hertz (daughter of a diamond merchant) on the island of Java. They had two sons and two daughters including Courtauld Thomson and Elspeth, wife of Wind in the Willows author Kenneth Grahame. His wife survived him and remarried in 1875 to John Fletcher Moulton (later Lord Moulton) and died in 1888.

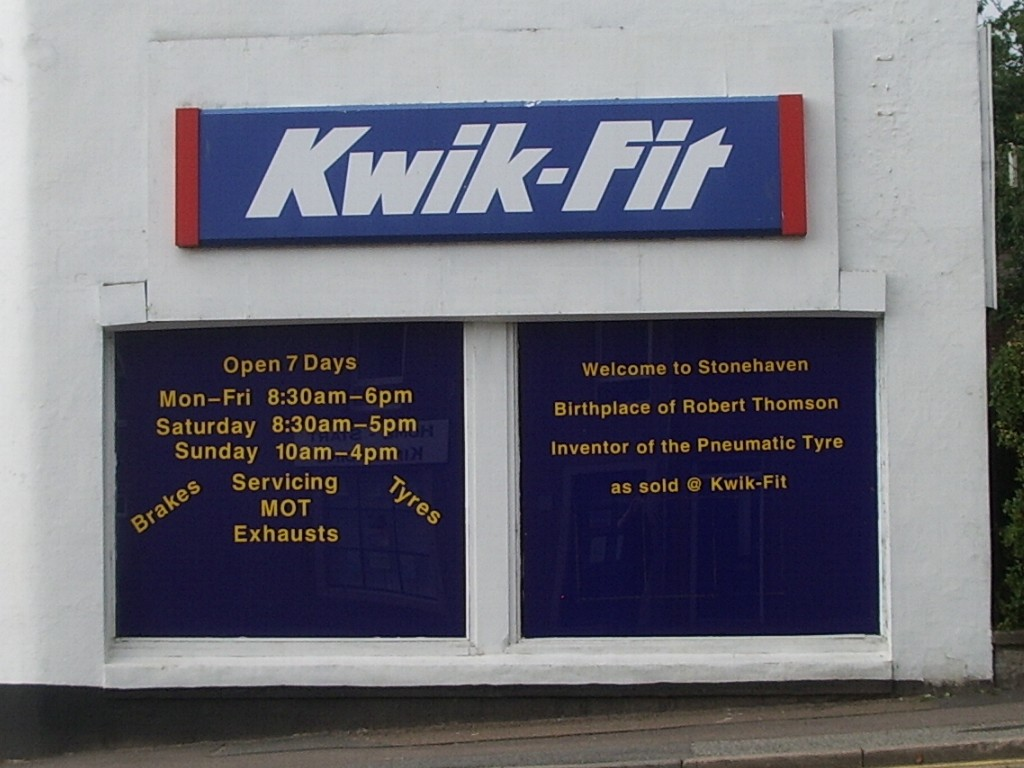
A tribute to Thomson in his birthplace, Stonehaven

== Patents and developments ==
- Pneumatic tyre ( see US Patent 5104)
- Writing and drawing instruments (the self-filling pen)
- Improvements in obtaining and applying motive power
- Dividing hard substances such as rock stone and coal
- Steam boilers
- Improvements in steam gauges
- Steam omnibuses
- Applying steam power in cultivating land
- Elastic wheel tyres
- Road steamers
- Guiding road steamers on street tramways
- Elastic belts, seats and other supports or cushions.

Thomson was also the originator of:

- The washing mangle with reversible mangles
- Elliptical rotary engine
- Use of electricity to detonate explosive charges
- Machinery for sugar manufacturing
- The portable steam crane
- Hydraulic dry dock

== Honours ==
In 2020 he was inducted into the Scottish Engineering Hall of Fame.
