= Chequers =

Country house of the British Prime Minister

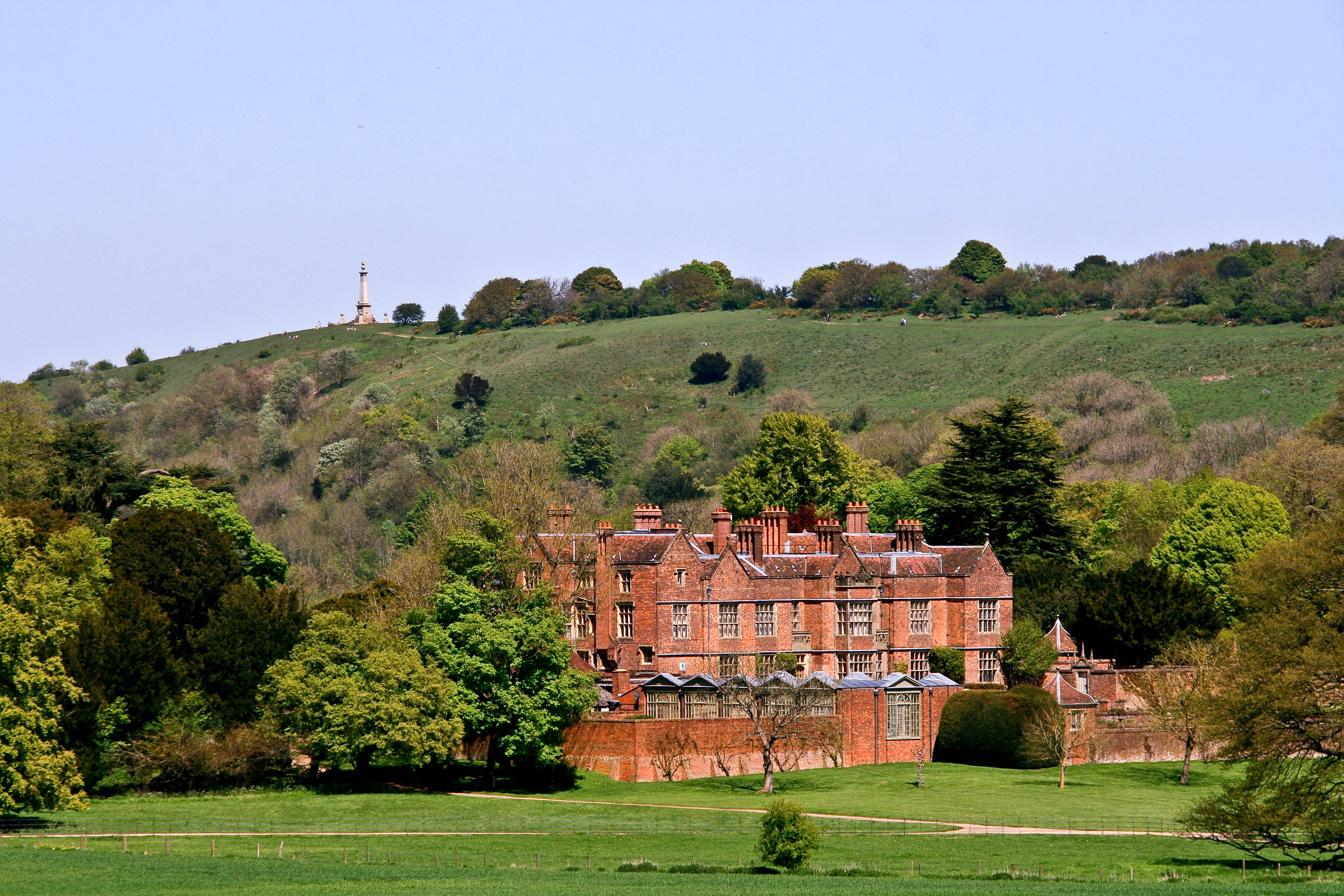
- Chequers, the official country residence of British prime ministers since 1921
- Alternative names: Chequers Court

General information
- Architectural style: Elizabethan
- Location: Missenden Road; Aylesbury; Buckinghamshire; HP17 0UZ
- Coordinates: 51°44′36″N 0°46′55″W
- Completed: c. 1556; 470 years ago
- Client: William Hawtrey
- Owner: The Chequers Trust

Technical details
- Material: Red brick with stone dressings and roof tiles

Listed Building – Grade I
- Official name: Chequers
- Designated: 21 June 1955
- Reference no.: 1125879

National Register of Historic Parks and Gardens
- Official name: Chequers
- Designated: 30 August 1987
- Reference no.: 1000595
- Grade: II

Chequers or Chequers Court (/ˈtʃɛkərz/ CHEK-ərz) is the country house of the prime minister of the United Kingdom. A 16th-century manor house, it lies near the village of Ellesborough, halfway between the towns of Princes Risborough and Wendover in Buckinghamshire, at the foot of the Chiltern Hills, 40 miles (64 km) north-west of Central London. Coombe Hill, which is two-thirds of a mile (1.1 km) northeast, was once mostly part of the estate.

Chequers has been the country home of the serving prime minister since 1921, when it was given to the nation by Viscount Lee of Fareham via a Deed of Settlement, given full effect in the Chequers Estate Act 1917. The house is listed Grade I on the National Heritage List for England.

== Location and setting ==
Chequers occupies a c. 200 hectares (490 acres) estate in the Chiltern Hills, 8 kilometres (5.0 miles) south of Aylesbury in Buckinghamshire, England. It sits in a shallow valley near the northern scarp of the Chilterns, which falls steeply to the Vale of Aylesbury. Sheltered by surrounding hills and woodland summits, the estate is enclosed on the east and south-east by the road linking the villages of Great Missenden and Ellesborough, and elsewhere by rolling farmland and woodland. The landscape rises on three sides around a gentle southward-sloping valley, with very little modern development visible in the setting.

== History ==
The estate takes its name from the Checker family, who owned it in the 12th and 13th centuries. Elias del Checker, the first recorded member of the family, was an usher at the King's Exchequer, hence his name: del Checker (Latinised as de Scaccario) means "of the Exchequer" in Anglo-Norman. Around 1254, Elias's grandson, Ralf, died without a male heir, causing the estate to pass into the hands of his son-in-law, William de Hauterive (or Hawtrey).

The current house was built by another William Hawtrey around 1565, possibly by reconstructing an earlier building. A reception room in the house bears his name today. Soon after its construction, Hawtrey acted as a custodian at Chequers for Lady Mary Grey, younger sister of Lady Jane Grey and great-granddaughter of King Henry VII. Lady Mary had married without the monarch's consent, and as punishment was banished from court by Queen Elizabeth I and kept confined. Lady Mary remained at Chequers for two years. The room where she slept from 1565 to 1567 remains in its original condition.

Through descent in the female line and marriages, the house passed through several families: the Wooleys, the Crokes and the Thurbanes. In 1715 the owner of the house married John Russell, a grandson of Oliver Cromwell. The house is known for this connection to the Cromwells, and still contains a large collection of Cromwell memorabilia.

In the 19th century the Russells (by now the Greenhill-Russell family) employed Henry Rhodes to make alterations to the house in the Gothic style. The Tudor panelling and windows were ripped out, and battlements with pinnacles installed. Towards the end of the 19th century, the house passed through marriage to the Astley family. Between 1892 and 1901 Bertram Astley restored the house to its Elizabethan origins, with advice from Reginald Blomfield. The restoration and design work was completed by the architect John Birch.

=== 20th century ===
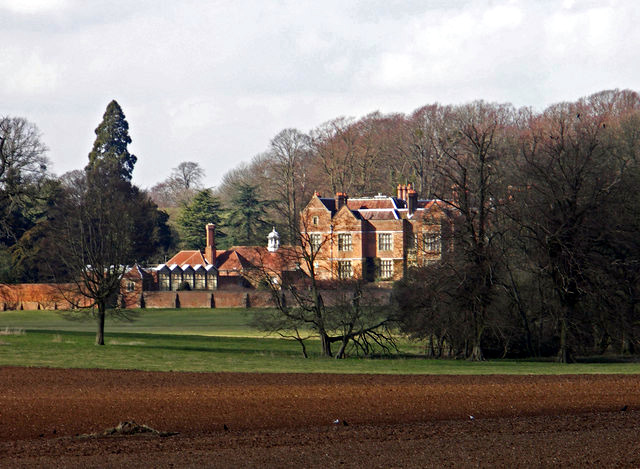
Chequers viewed from the rear in 2006

It is not possible to foresee or foretell from what classes or conditions of life the future wielders of power in this country will be drawn. Some may be as in the past men of wealth and famous descent; some may belong to the world of trade and business; others may spring from the ranks of the manual toilers. To none of these [...] could the spirit and anodyne of Chequers do anything but good. [...], the better the health of our rulers the more sanely will they rule and the inducement to spend two days a week in the high and pure air of the Chiltern hills and woods will, it is hoped, benefit the nation as well as its chosen leaders.

— Lee's rationale for the gift, set out in the Chequers Estate Act 1917

This house of peace and ancient memories was given to England as a thank-offering for her deliverance in the great war of 1914–1918 as a place of rest and recreation for her Prime Ministers for ever.

— Inscription in a stained glass window in the long gallery of the house commissioned by Lord and Lady Lee

In 1909 the house was taken on a long lease by Arthur Lee and his wife Ruth (an American heiress). Lee immediately re-engaged Blomfield to undertake a restoration of the interior. At the same time, Henry Avray Tipping undertook the design of several walled gardens from 1911 to 1912. In 1912, after the death of the last of the house's ancestral owners Henry Delaval Astley, Ruth Lee and her sister purchased the property and later gave it to Arthur Lee.

During the First World War the house became a hospital and then a convalescent home for officers. After the war, Chequers became a private home again (now furnished with many 16th-century antiques and tapestries and the Cromwellian antiquities), and the childless Lees formed a plan. While previous prime ministers had always belonged to the landed classes, the post–First World War era was bringing in a new breed of politician. These men did not have the spacious country houses of previous prime ministers in which to entertain foreign dignitaries or a tranquil place to relax from the affairs of state. After long discussions with Prime Minister David Lloyd George, Chequers was given to the nation as a country retreat for the serving prime minister under the Chequers Estate Act 1917. The act established a trust of ex-officio trustees to administer the estate and the associated trust fund.

The Lees, by this time Lord and Lady Lee of Fareham, left Chequers on 8 January 1921 after a final dinner at the house. A political disagreement between the Lees and Lloyd George soured the handover, which went ahead nonetheless.

The property houses one of the largest collections of art and memorabilia pertaining to Oliver Cromwell in the country. It also houses many other national antiques and books, held in the famous "long room", including a diary of Horatio Nelson and the Chequers Ring, one of the few surviving pieces of jewellery worn by Elizabeth I. The collection is not open to the public.

Nearby Coombe Hill was part of the estate until the 1920s, when it was given to the National Trust. Coombe Hill and the Chequers Estate are part of the Chilterns Area of Outstanding Natural Beauty, designated in 1965. The landscaped park, woodlands and formal gardens surrounding Chequers are listed Grade II on the Register of Historic Parks and Gardens.

During the early part of the Second World War it was considered that security at Chequers was inadequate to protect the prime minister, Sir Winston Churchill. Therefore, he used Ditchley in Oxfordshire until late 1942, by which time the approach road, clearly visible from the sky, had been camouflaged and other security measures had been put in place.

Chequers under Neville Chamberlain had one telephone, in the kitchen, but Churchill "at once installed a whole battery on his desk and had them in constant use", according to Lord Portal of Hungerford, who served as Chief of the Air Staff during the Second World War.

By 1958, the trust had expanded to fourteen members. The Chequers Estate Act 1958 reduced the number to six during the lifetime of Ruth Lee and to five thereafter, which consisted of the Lord Privy Seal, a nominee of the Prime Minister, a nominee of the Ministry of Works, the Chairman of the National Trust, and the Public Trustee. The 1958 act authorised HM Treasury to pay grants to assist the administrative trustees under the original deed.

=== 21st century ===
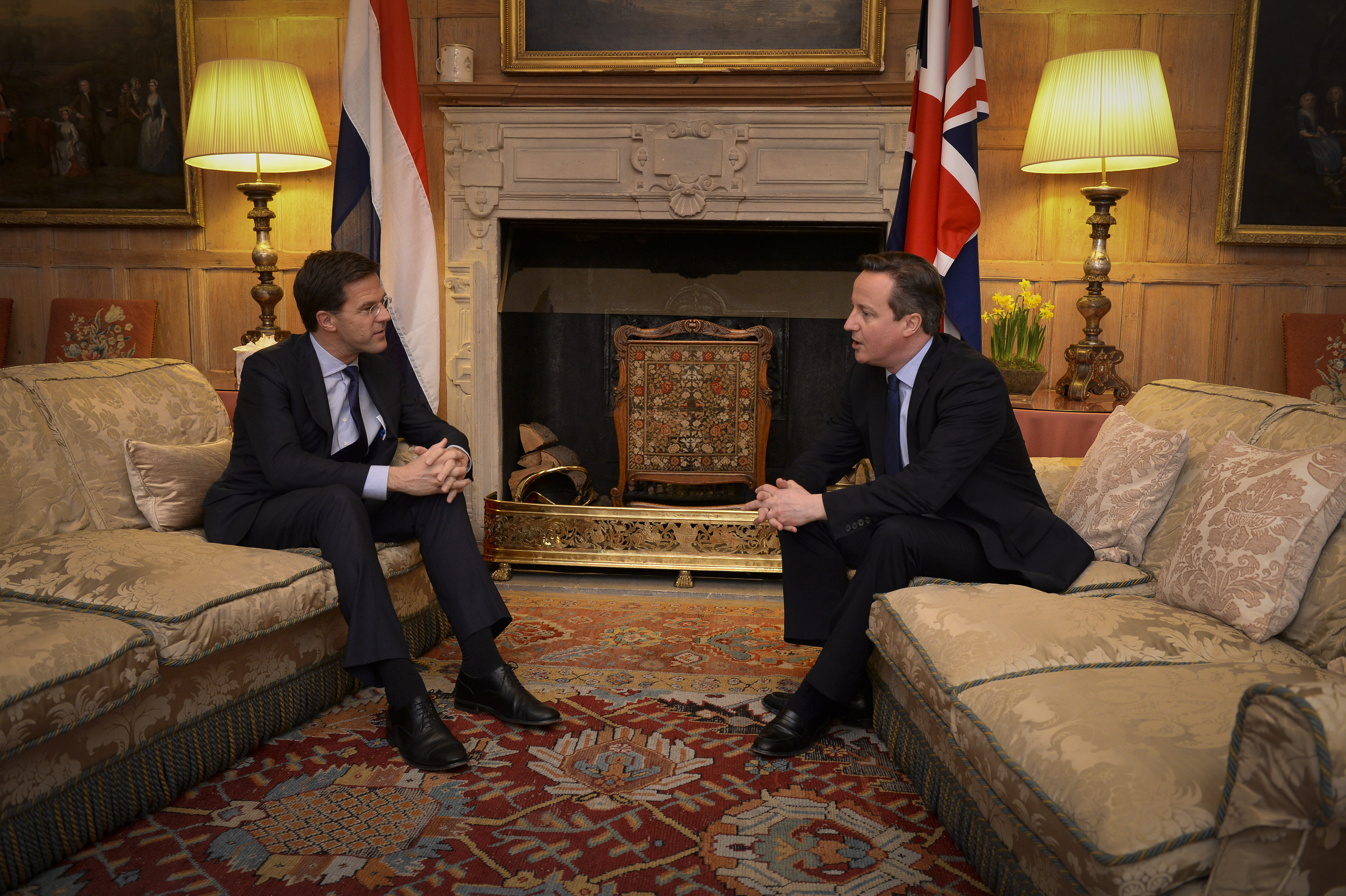
David Cameron and Dutch prime minister Mark Rutte in the great hall, 2014

On 1 June 2007, the Chequers estate was designated as a protected site under Section 128 of the Serious Organised Crime and Police Act 2005. This specifically criminalised trespass into the estate.

In July 2018, Prime Minister Theresa May held a Cabinet meeting at Chequers to settle the details of Britain's exit from the European Union, the end result of which was the "Chequers plan".

In April 2020, Prime Minister Boris Johnson chose to recover at Chequers after being hospitalised at St Thomas' Hospital, London, with respiratory complications from COVID-19 that necessitated three nights in intensive care.

== Architecture and design ==
=== Exterior ===
Constructed of red brick with stone dressings and old tile roofs, the house has diagonal brick chimney shafts with offset heads. It follows a courtyard plan, with 19th-century central infill. It comprises two storeys and an attic.

The north elevation of eight bays retains most of its original detail, including stone quoins, string courses, and a parapet coping carried over five small gables. It has four-light stone mullion windows, double-transomed and partly renewed, with canted bay windows to the second and sixth bays; these bays have shaped stone parapets bearing 16th-century heraldic devices. At attic has five cross windows. A doorway to the right of centre has a four-centred stone arch with carved spandrels.

The south elevation retains seven original bays, of which the outer and central bays are gabled and projecting. The narrow bays on either side of the centre are recessed and have a first-floor stone frieze inscribed with the Astley family motto: Justitia tenax (Latin for 'tenacious of justice'). Late 19th-century stone mullion-and-transom windows match those on the north elevation; the centre has a rectangular bay window with a heraldic parapet. Double doors set in a segmental stone arch occupy the third bay. A taller gabled bay was added to the left in the mid-19th century by E. B. Lamb. The irregular east front includes a two-storey porch by Blomfield of about 1910.

=== Interior ===
The interior was extensively refurbished in the early 20th century and features plaster ceilings in the Elizabethan style together with re-used 16th- and 17th-century panelling that is not original to the house.

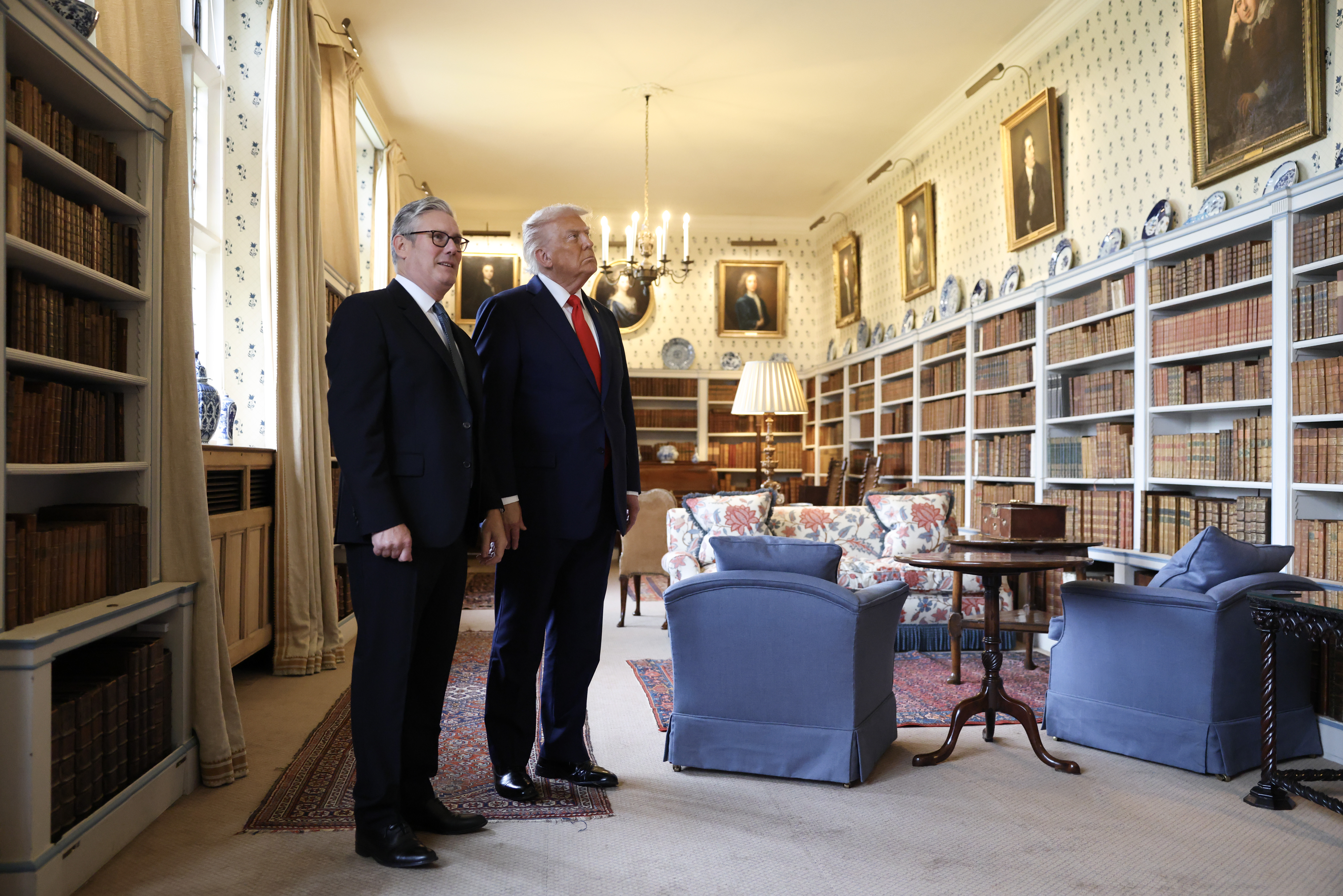
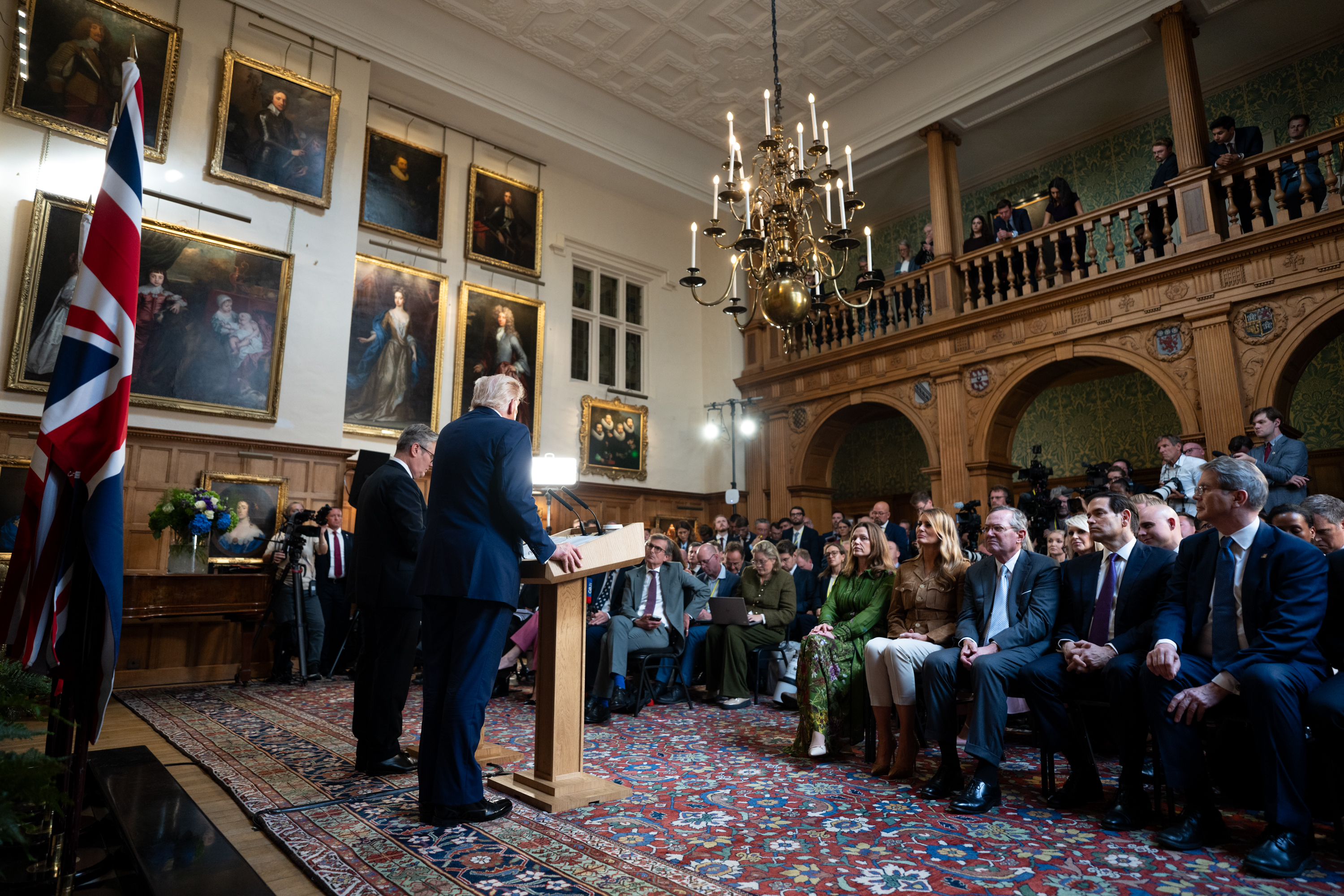
The interior of Chequers, seen during the 2025 state visit by US President Donald Trump

The interiors and collection at Chequers largely reflect the work of Ruth and Arthur Lee, who between 1909 and 1921 undertook the restoration of the house. In collaboration with Blomfield, they acquired furnishings from auction houses and antique dealers, and commissioned reproduction pieces from firms including Gill & Reigate (decorators to King George V) and furniture manufacturers Nicholls & Janes of High Wycombe. Additional furniture was inherited with the purchase of the house itself.

The collection contains a significant number of late 17th- and early 18th-century caned chairs, including a large suite of green lacquered examples, together with various lacquer pieces and furniture with painted decorative surfaces. Notable items include a table made by George Bullock for Napoleon’s drawing room at Longwood House on Saint Helena, and a large leather-bound trunk decorated with brass studs that is said to have belonged to James II while he was Lord High Admiral.

=== Gardens ===
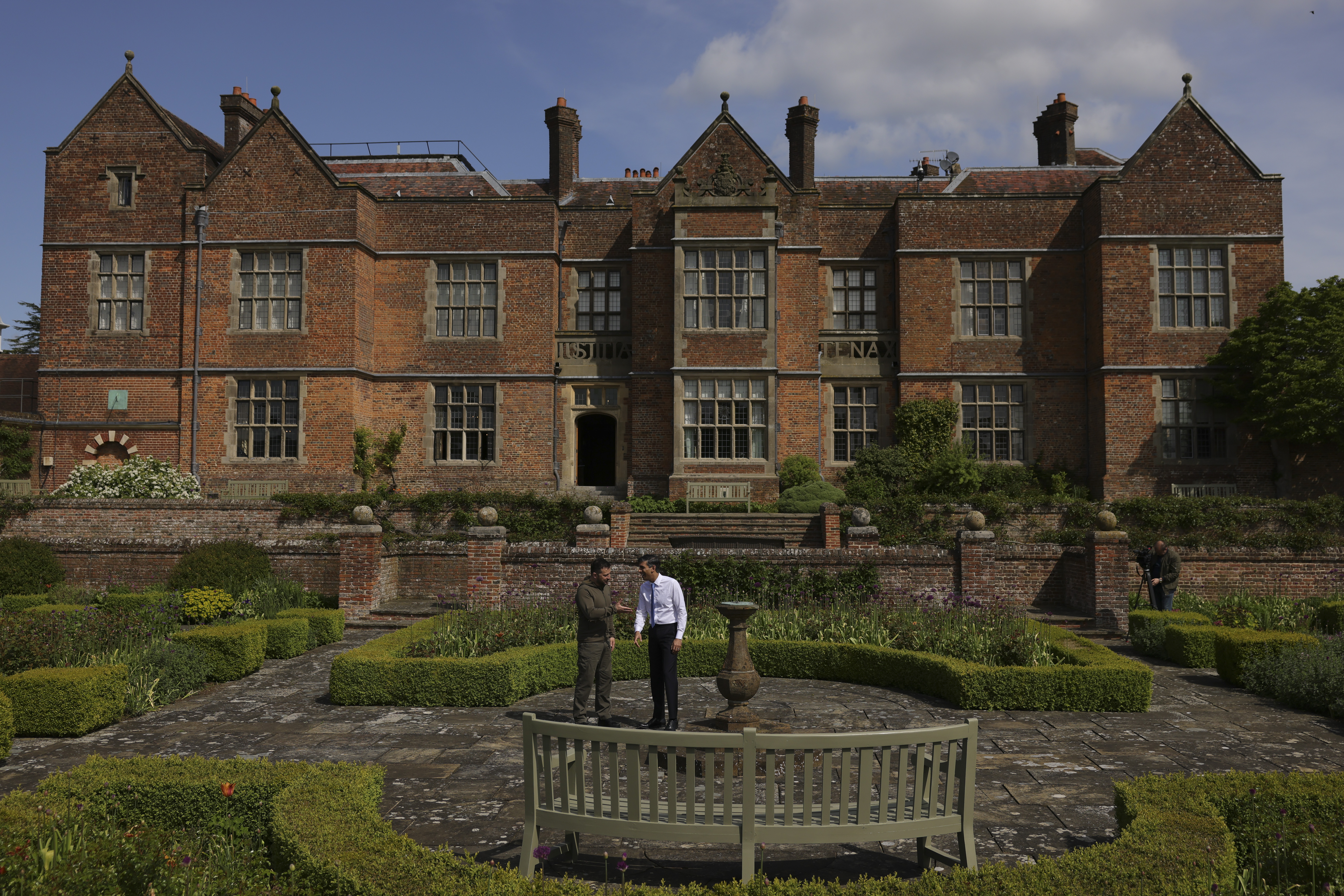
UK Prime Minister Rishi Sunak and President of Ukraine Volodymyr Zelenskyy in the Chequers south garden in May 2023

On the east and south sides of the house are gardens enclosed by brick walls dating from 1912. The south garden has small corner pavilions with ogee tile roofs, stone cornices and mullion windows, and four-centred stone arches with Tudor hood moulds. It also contains a 1970s glazed arcade along the west side giving access to a covered swimming pool, together with a sunken centre bounded by brick walls. The gate between the gardens is surmounted by three stone obelisk finials; the east gate piers have similar finials on scrolls.

A kitchen garden is situated to the east of the house, which continues to supply produce for the house. It is separated from the house by a lawn containing specimen memorial trees planted by former prime ministers and visiting foreign heads of state. It is a walled garden enclosed on three sides by brick walls, with a twentieth-century agricultural dwelling occupying the west side. Two small greenhouses stand against the north wall and immediately to the north of this wall lies a range of potting sheds and associated outbuildings. An orchard extends to the east of the garden. A half-timbered and brick gateway is aligned with a straight axial path that runs west–east through both the garden and the orchard. To the west of the garden stands an ornamental brick-and-flint kennel with related buildings.

== Estate ==
The Chequers Estate is divided into several areas. The North Park and South Park lie north and south of the house respectively, separated by the kitchen garden area and the house. These park areas are visually bounded to the east by the area of extensive woodland beyond the site, running up the eastern hillside. The South Park is divided into two: the southern half is arable land, with some single park trees and an occasional group; the northern half is pasture, also with single trees. The North Park is pasture, bounded at the north end by a belt of trees. South-west of the house the park is open arable, bounded on the west by Mable and Whorley Woods. These woods frame the view to the south-west and west.

The large tract of land west of the house is rough pasture with the remains of field boundaries marked by trees. North-west of the house is a valley called The Dene running uphill away from the house. The area is arable with several large tree clumps in it. North of this, Beacon Hill, a high, grassy ridge, dominates the western parkland. It stands out as a landmark from the Vale of Aylesbury to the north. There are panoramic views of the Vale of Aylesbury from the north edge of the site, particularly the spine of Beacon Hill.

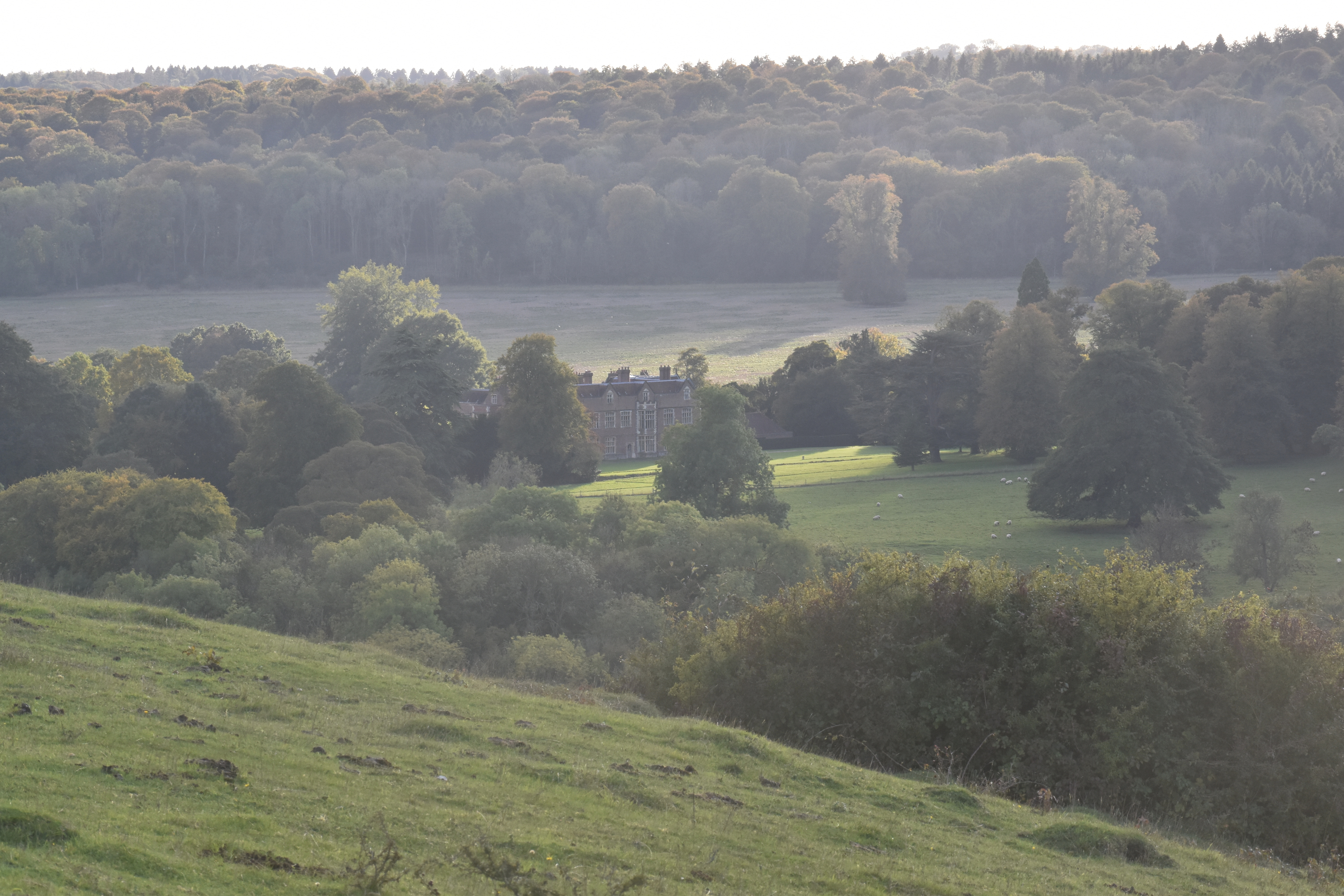
Chequers from the Ridgeway National Trail in 2023

In the north-west of the site a detached area of parkland is bounded by Little Kimble Hill and the lane to Ellesborough, and the Warrens to the south-east. It is pasture with a series of mostly dry, small ponds running north through it, which are connected with Silver Springs pond to the south-east. The parkland slopes down to the north-west. A 19th century brick lodge stands at its north-west point. Extensive ancient ditches and earthworks are present.

The western end of the estate consists of woodland and scrub on the Chiltern escarpment. Many paths and a drive run through this area which was a medieval warren. In the late 19th century various ornamental features existed, such as the Velvet Lawn south of Cymbeline's Castle, Happy Valley, and Silver Springs, now two dry ponds. In 1909, the Silver Springs ponds were stocked with trout. These features are now largely overgrown. A dominant natural and very rare feature is the quantity of native box plants growing beneath the trees, which is designated as the Ellesborough and Kimble Warrens Site of Special Scientific Interest. Panoramic views of the Vale of Aylesbury open up at various points in this area.

The Ridgeway National Trail crosses through the estate.

== Ownership and management ==
The estate is owned by the Chequers Trust and is placed at the disposal of the serving prime minister. Management and maintenance of the property are undertaken independently by the trust, which maintains it from an endowment administered by the trustees. The Prime Minister’s Office provides an annual grant-in-aid to the trust, as a contribution towards staff salaries and maintenance; particulars appear in the Cabinet Office annual accounts. Staff employed at Chequers are not civil servants, and their terms and conditions of service are determined by the trustees.

== Historic collections ==
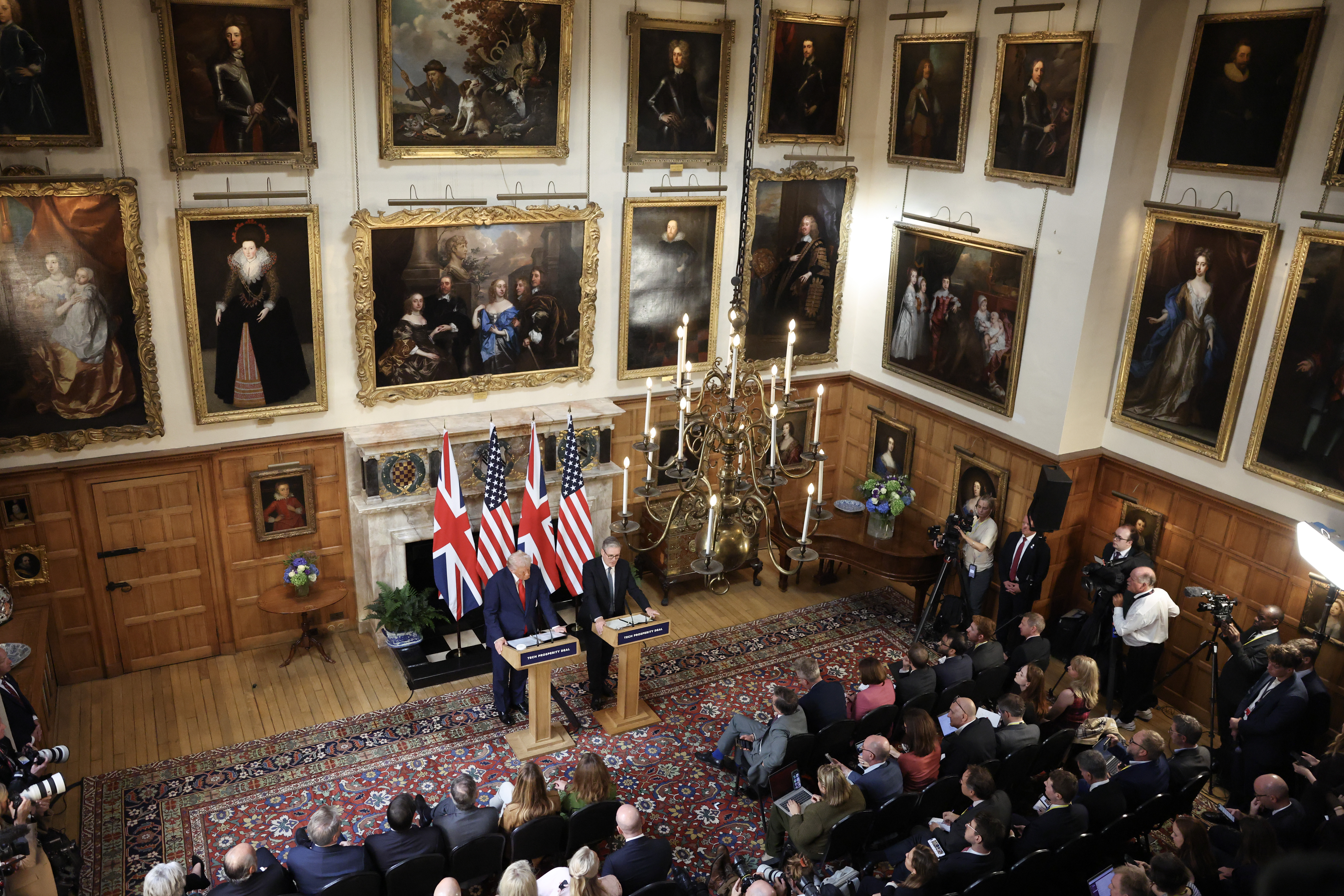
The Great Hall has many historic paintings from the Chequers Trust's art collection on display

The Chequers Trust owns a large collection of paintings which are on display at Chequers. The collection originates from two principal sources. The first and original group comprises works accumulated by successive owners of Chequers and their families. These, consisting almost entirely of portraits, were inherited by Lord Lee when he acquired the estate in 1909.

The second group consists of paintings acquired by Lord Lee himself to extend the scope of the collection. He focused particularly on securing portraits of notable figures from the late sixteenth to early eighteenth centuries, among them Sir Walter Raleigh, Lord Clarendon, Prince Rupert, Sir Francis Bacon, and the Duke of Marlborough. In addition, Lord Lee assembled a selection of works by major artists, including Rembrandt, John Constable, Joshua Reynolds, and Anthony van Dyck.

The trust also owns several historic artefacts, including the death mask of Oliver Cromwell, Queen Elizabeth I’s ring, a pocket watch once owned by Lord Nelson and Napoleon's dispatch case.

The library in the Long Gallery features early editions of books by Geoffrey Chaucer, Charles Dickens, and poet laureate Lord Tennyson.

== Gallery ==
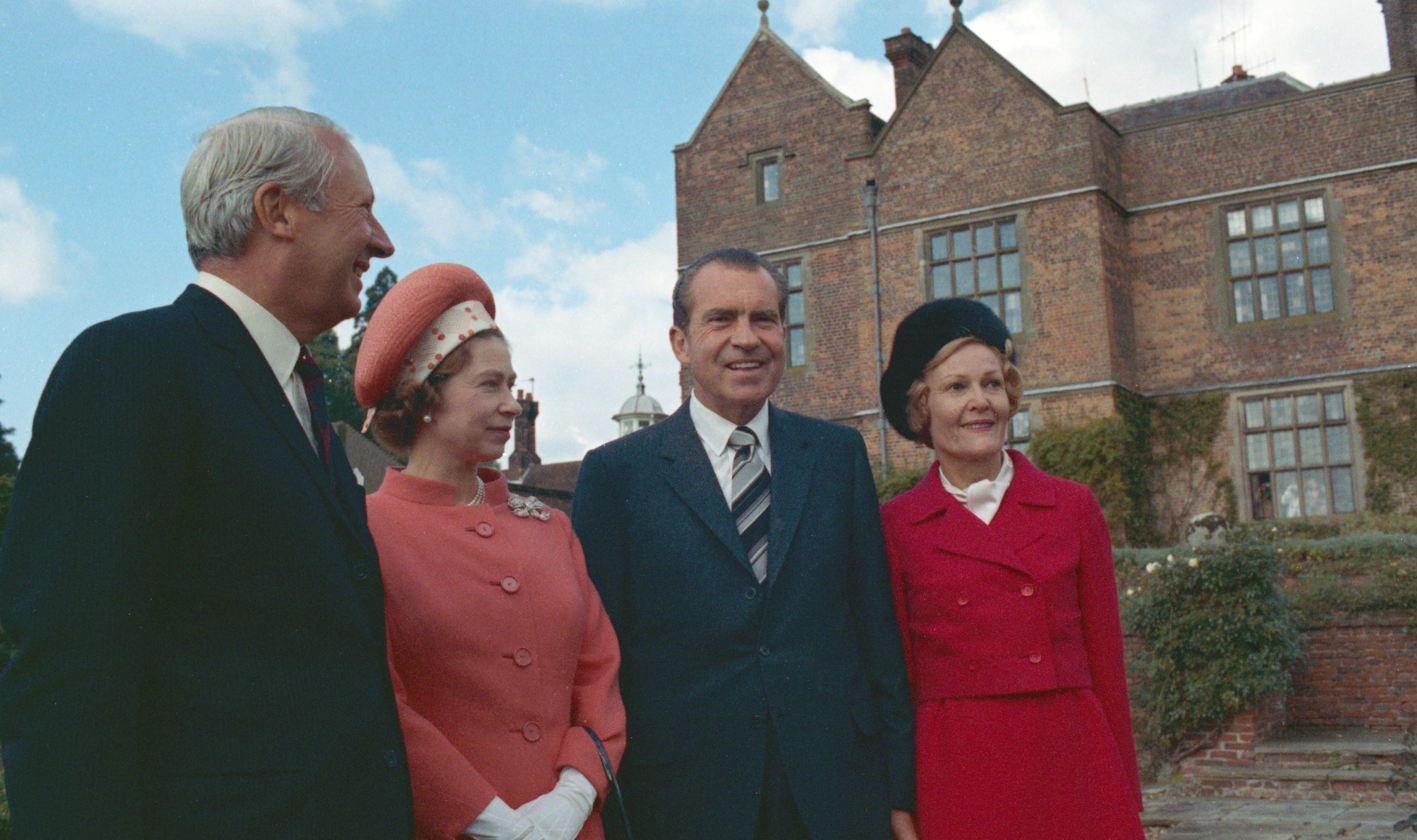
Edward Heath and Elizabeth II with Richard and Pat Nixon, 1970

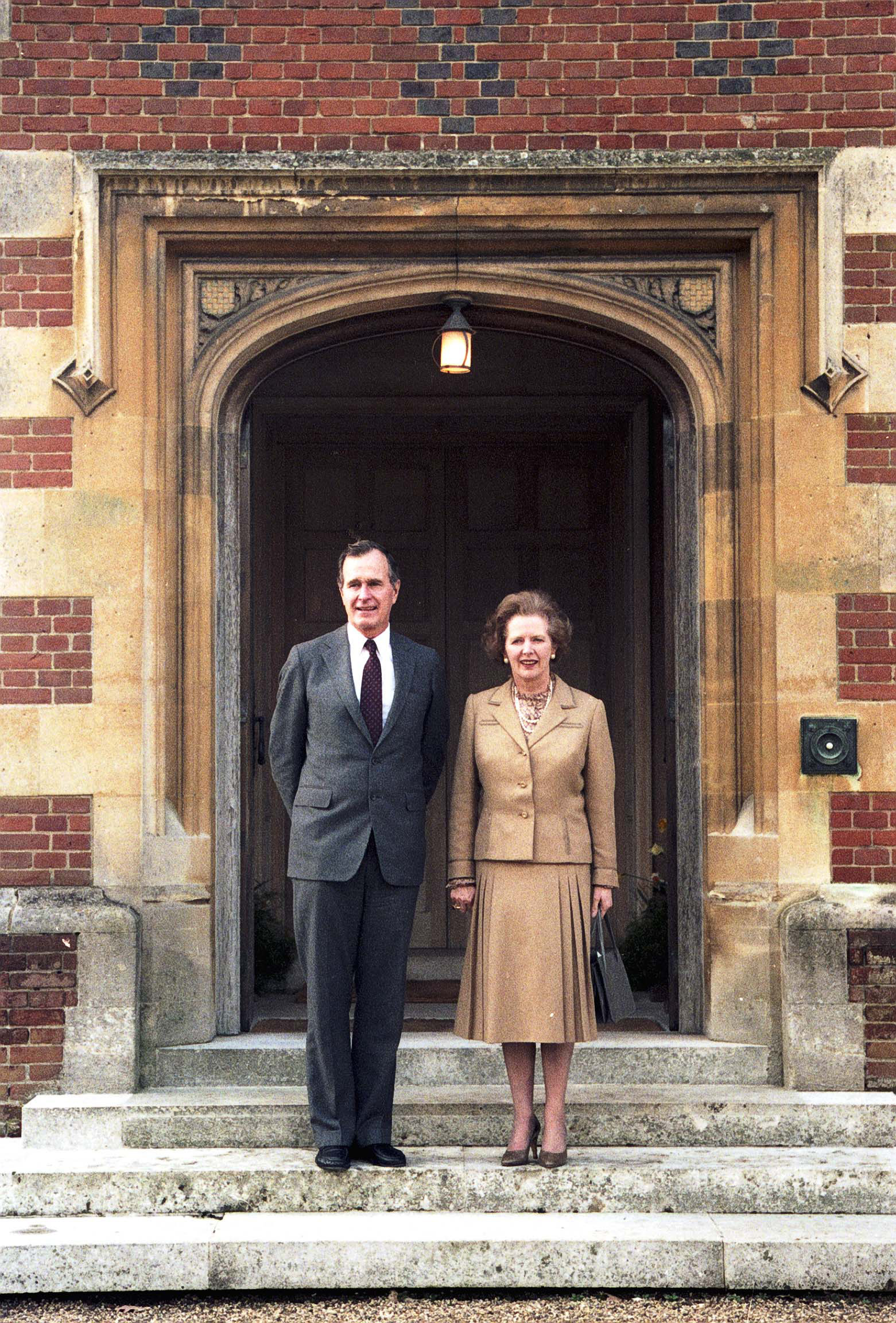
Margaret Thatcher and George H. W. Bush, 1984

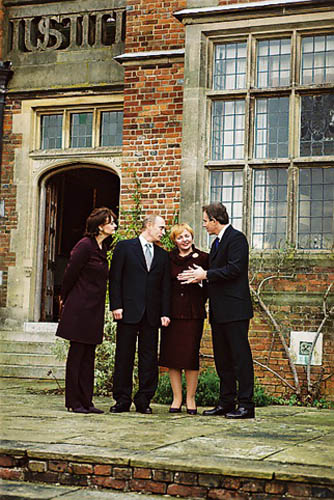
Tony Blair and Vladimir Putin with their wives, 2001

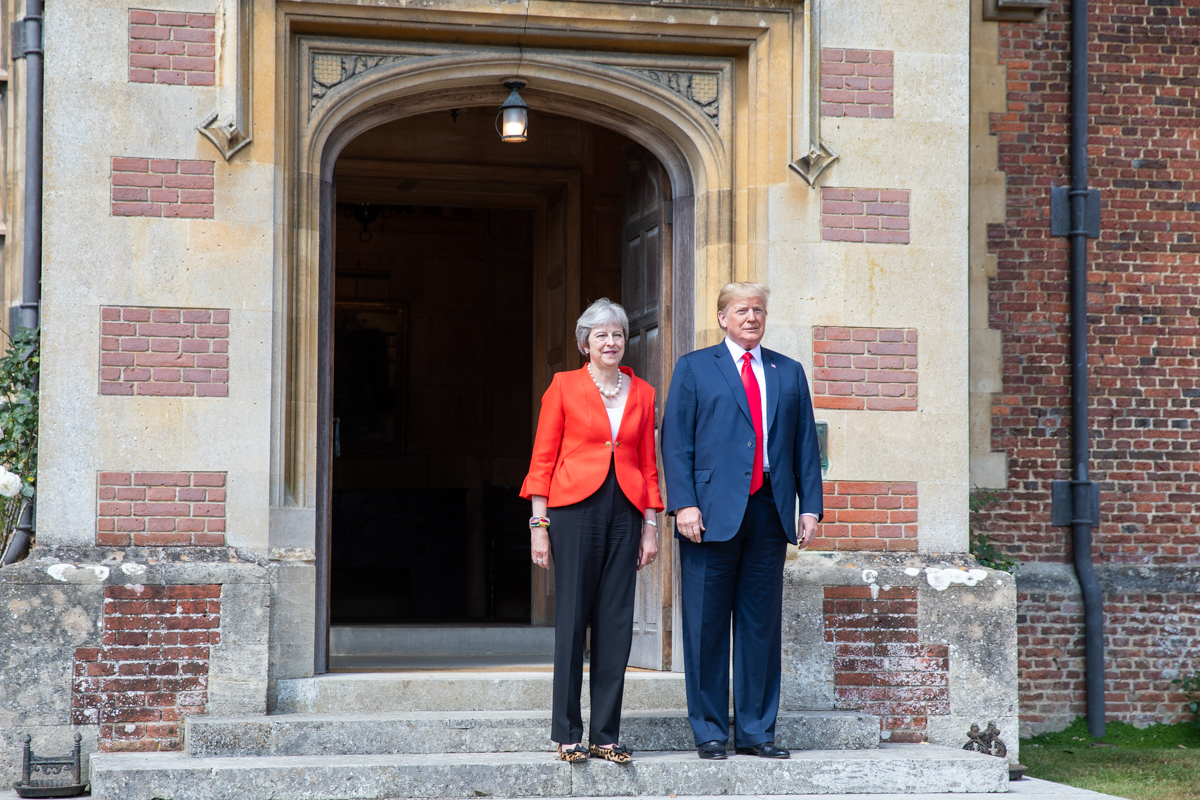
Theresa May and Donald Trump, 2018

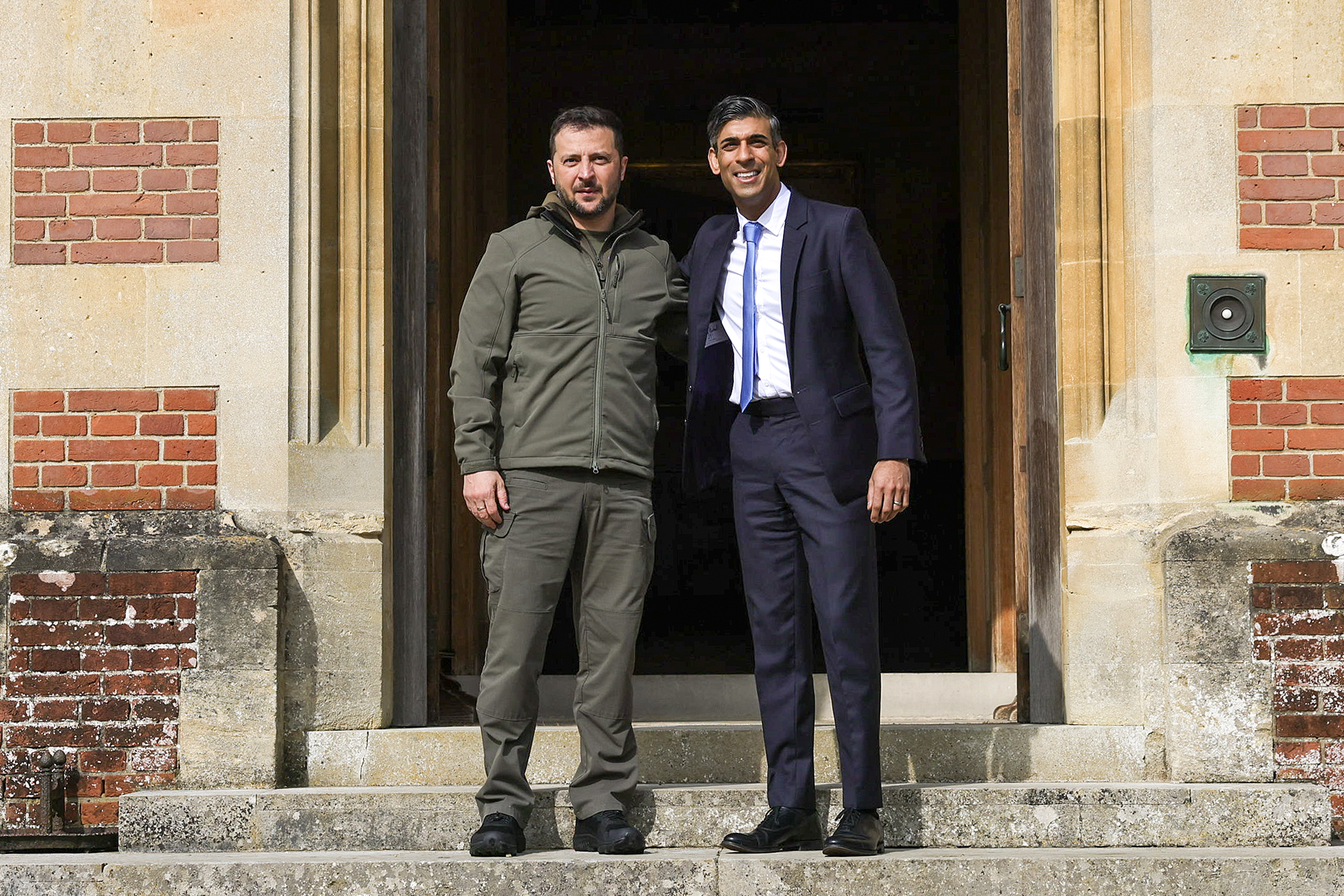
Rishi Sunak and Volodymyr Zelenskyy, 2023

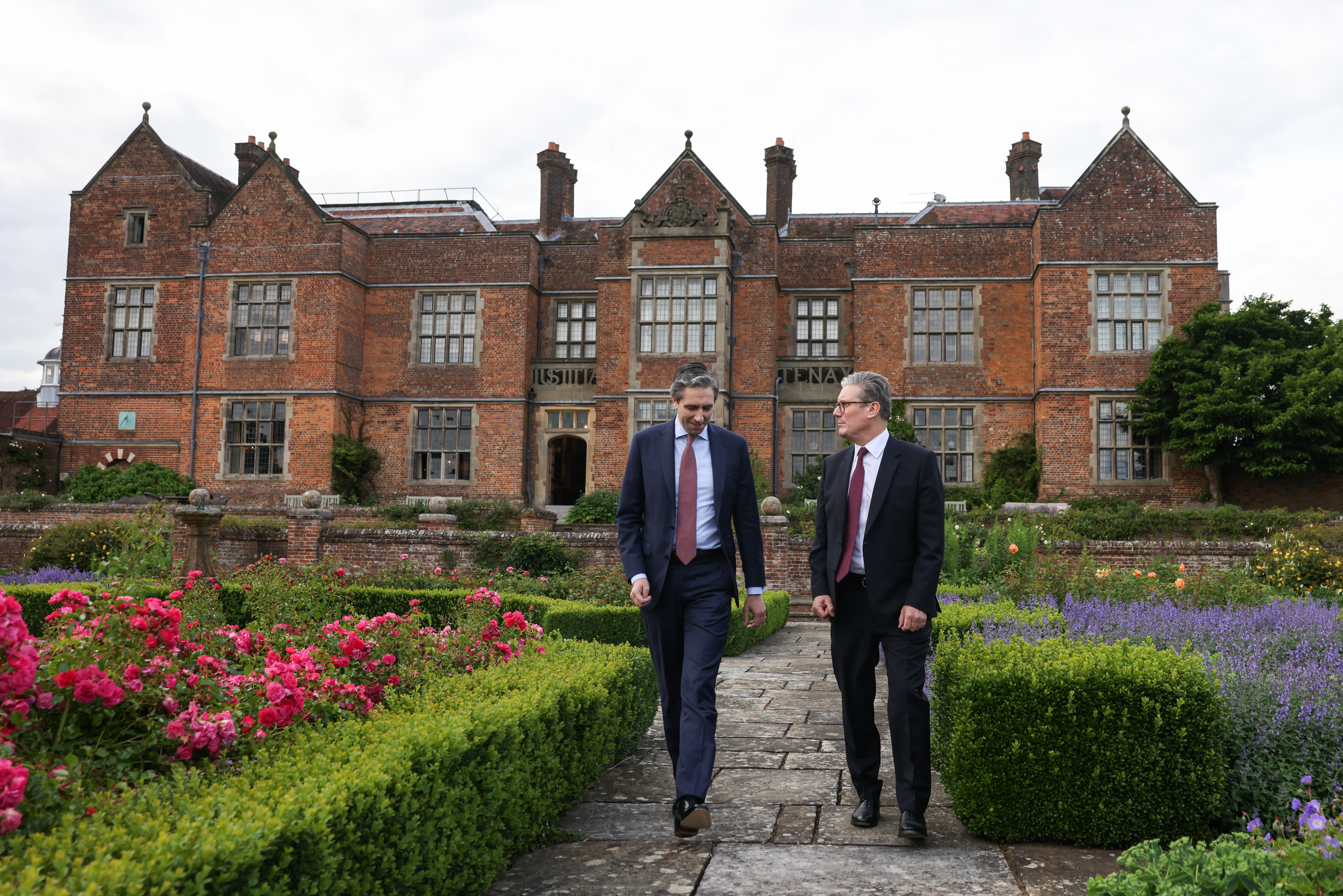
Sir Keir Starmer meets Irish Taoiseach Simon Harris, 2024

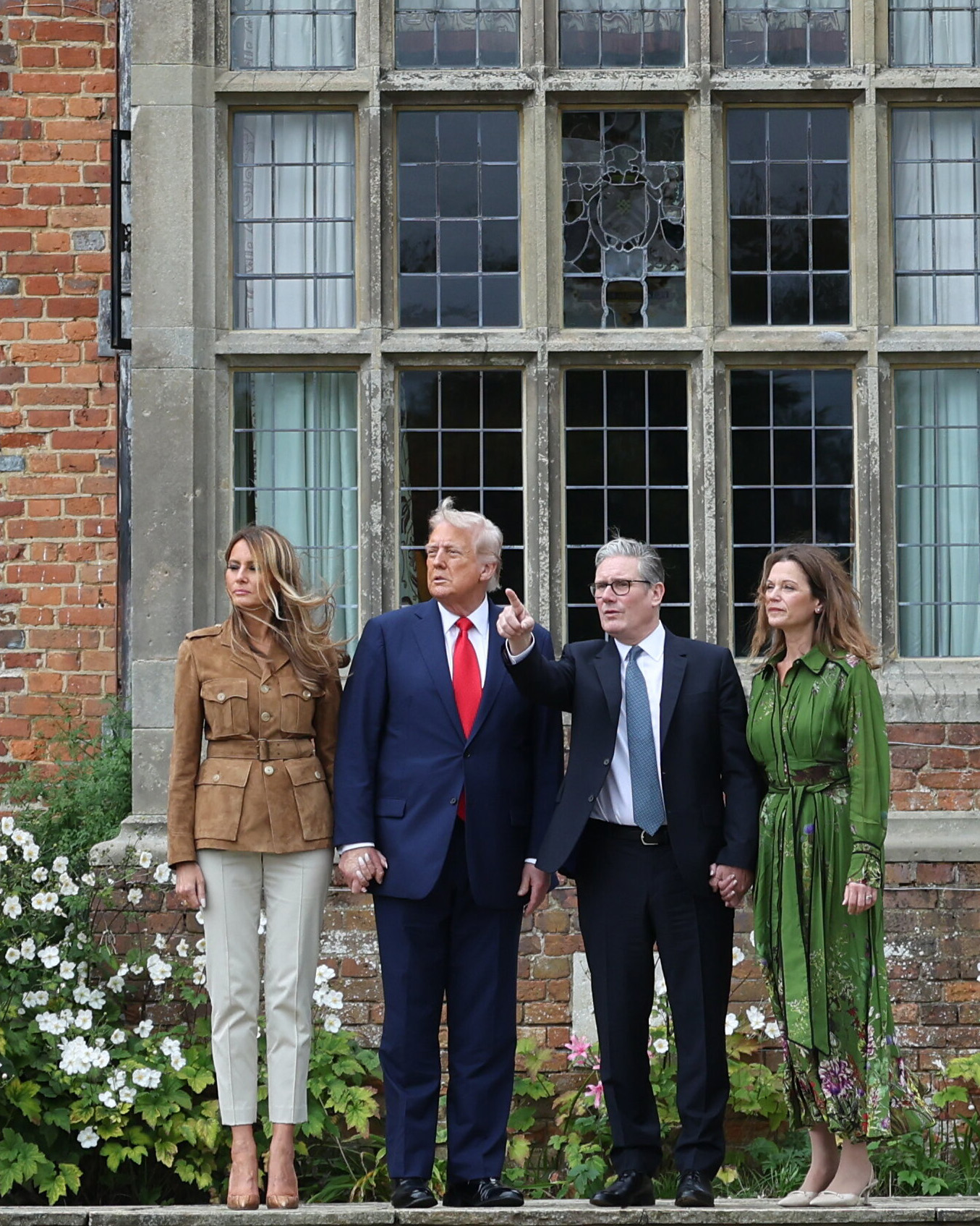
Sir Keir Starmer and Donald Trump with their wives, 2025

== See also ==
- 10 Downing Street, the prime minister's London office and official residence of the first lord of the treasury
- Camp David, the country retreat of the president of the United States
- Chevening, the foreign secretary's country residence
- Dorneywood, another country house used by high-ranking British officials
- Harrington Lake, the country retreat of the prime minister of Canada
- List of official residences
