= Chequers Ring =

Jewellery worn by Queen Elizabeth I of England

Chequers Ring, three-quarter profile

The Chequers Ring is one of the few surviving pieces of jewellery worn by Queen Elizabeth I of England. The mother-of-pearl ring, set with gold and rubies, includes a locket with two portraits, one depicting Elizabeth and the other traditionally identified as Elizabeth's mother Anne Boleyn, but possibly her step-mother Catherine Parr. The ring is presently housed at Chequers, the country house of the prime minister of the United Kingdom.

== Description ==
The ring is tentatively dated to the mid-1570s. A mother-of-pearl hoop is mounted with sheet gold set with table-cut rubies, found on the sides of the bezel and on the shoulders. White diamonds on the bezel form the letter E (for Elizabeth), with a cobalt blue enamel letter R (for Regina, meaning queen) underneath. More rubies surround the letters, along with a pearl. The back of the bezel is decorated with an enamel phoenix, symbol of the Seymour family, suggesting that Elizabeth may have received the ring as a gift from a Seymour. Alternatively, the phoenix was a common motif in Elizabeth's portraits and jewellery, and therefore may not have anything to do with the Seymours at all. It has since been suggested that the ring may have been given to the Queen by Robert Dudley, Earl of Leicester, her long-time favourite, in 1575.

=== Portraits ===
The bezel is hinged to form a locket. Two women are depicted in the secret compartment. Elizabeth is the older one, portrayed in an enamel cameo on the leaf of the jewel inset with a ruby. On the shank of the jewel there is a portrait miniature of a young woman dating from c. 1535–1545. It is made of layers of enamel in an imitation of a cameo. There is a small diamond at the woman's breast.

Due to her portrait's juxtaposition with the cameo of Elizabeth, the younger woman has traditionally been identified as Anne Boleyn, Elizabeth's mother, who was executed when Elizabeth was two years old. Elizabeth mentioned Anne very rarely, and the ring is sometimes claimed to be the evidence of her affection for the memory of her mother, or said to have reminded Elizabeth to be more prudent in politics than her mother.

The identification of the younger woman as Anne Boleyn has been challenged, as the red-gold hair of the woman in the portrait does not fit modern conceptions of Anne Boleyn, now widely conceived as bearing black hair; however, this description is due to sources generally deemed historically unreliable (such as Nicholas Sanders), and a variety of portraiture – none of which can be said with certainty to depict the Queen as she was in life – is extant, much of which was painted by people who had never seen her. All extant portraits purporting to be of Anne Boleyn have suffered degradation due to damage by air pollution and the oxidisation of pigments used, possibly darkening originally light colours.

Following Boleyn's execution at the hands of Henry VIII, it became unfashionable, and likely even dangerous, to exhibit or discuss authentic relics, artefacts and memories of her shortly after her death. Few descriptions exist of her appearance; Sir Thomas Wyatt, writing poetically, writes of her "tress [...] of crisped gold". A sketch of Anne Boleyn, by Hans Holbein the Younger, labelled thus by Sir John Cheke, shows her hair matching the ring.

Possibly the ring's portrait miniature depicts Catherine Parr, Elizabeth's red-haired stepmother. Elizabeth was unusually close to Catherine, who was her mother figure in early adolescence. Catherine later married into the Seymour family, which would explain the phoenix symbol.

The portrait may also depict Elizabeth's sister Mary I, who had light reddish hair.

== History ==
According to legend, Robert Carey, Elizabeth I's maternal relative, took the ring from her finger when she died at Richmond Palace in 1603, and took it to James I in Scotland as a token of her death. Her jewellery collection was soon dispersed by the new king and queen, James I and Anne of Denmark. Sir John Eliot denounced this as a national loss, lamenting in a speech to Parliament in 1626:

O! those jewels! The pride and glory of this realm! Which have made it so far shining above all others! Would they were here, within the compass of these walls, to be viewed and seen by us and to be examined in this place. Their very name and memory have transported me!

The ring is one of the few surviving pieces of jewellery worn by Elizabeth I. It may have been presented by James I to Alexander Home, 1st Earl of Home (c. 1566–1619), and it descended through the Home family until its sale at Christie's on 17 June 1920. It was acquired by Arthur Lee, 1st Viscount Lee of Fareham (1868–1947).

Lee presented his country house at Chequers and its collection to the British nation, for use as the country house of the prime minister of the United Kingdom. The ring is still housed at Chequers. It was loaned for the first time in 2002 to be exhibited at the National Maritime Museum, and went on public display for the first time in March 2003.

== See also ==
- Portraiture of Elizabeth I of England
- Inventory of Elizabeth I of England
- Crown Jewels of the United Kingdom
