= Beacon Fell =

Beacon Fell may refer to:

- Beacon Fell, Cumbria, England
- Beacon Fell, Lancashire, England, a Country Park since 1970
  - Beacon Fell Traditional Lancashire Cheese named after the fell

== See also ==
- Beacon Hill (disambiguation)
