= Courtauld Courtauld-Thomson, 1st Baron Courtauld-Thomson =

British businessman

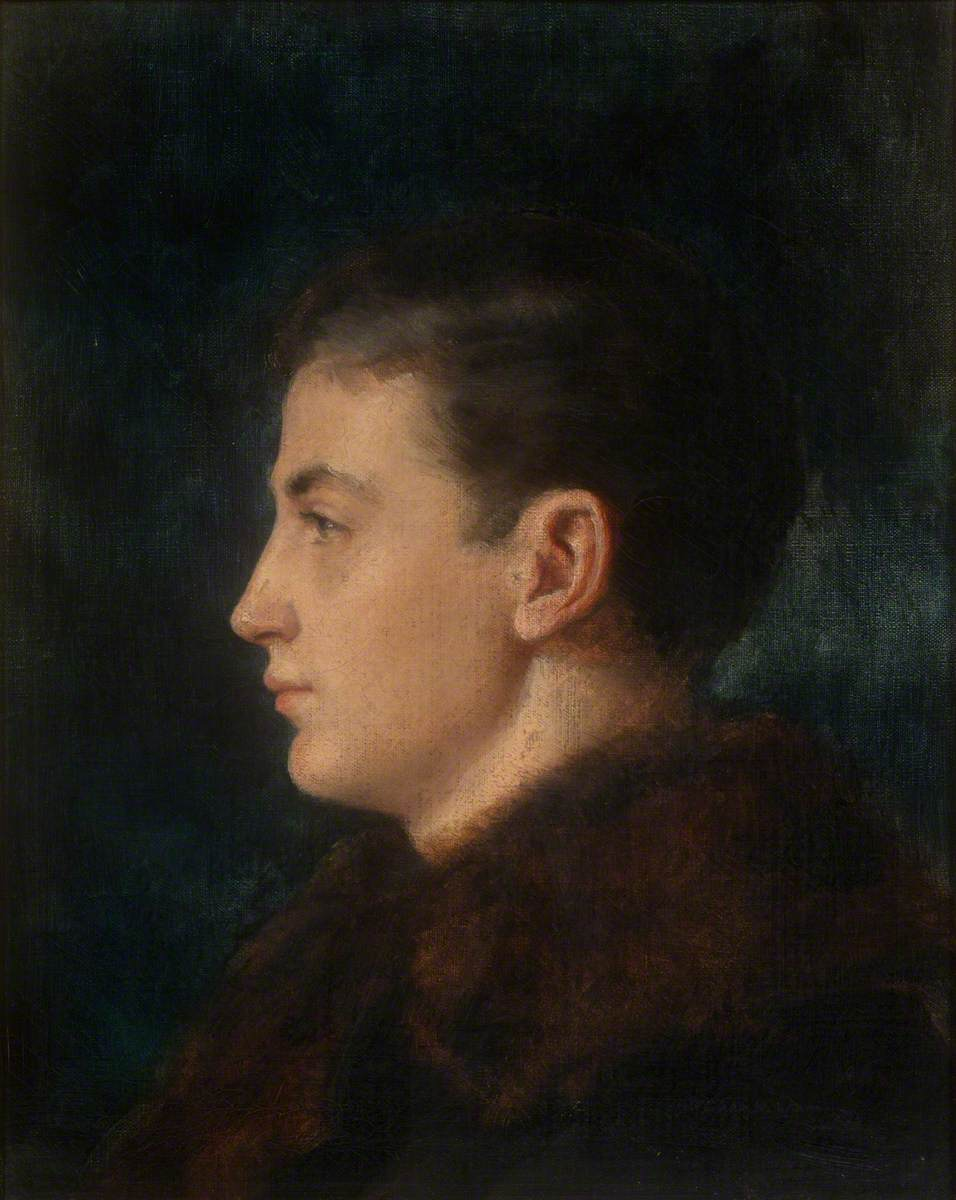

Courtauld Greenwood Courtauld-Thomson, 1st Baron Courtauld-Thomson, KBE CB (born Courtauld Thomson; 16 August 1866 – 1 November 1954) was a British businessman and holder of public and charitable offices.

== Background ==
Thomson was the son of Robert William Thomson, of Edinburgh, inventor of the pneumatic tyre, and his wife Clara (née Hertz). After the death of his father in 1873, his mother married, in 1875, John Fletcher Moulton, later Lord Moulton. She died in 1888.

Thomson was educated at Eton and Magdalen College, Oxford.

== Career ==
Thomson had a successful business career, becoming chairman of the Employers' Liability Assurance Corporation, among other directorships. In 1914 he was appointed Commissioner for the Red Cross and Order of St John. In 1916, he was appointed a CB and in 1918 a KBE. His country seat was at Dorneywood in Buckinghamshire. He was High Sheriff of Buckinghamshire in 1933. In the Second World War he turned it into a hostel for officers in the allied air forces. In 1943, together with his two sisters (one of whom, Elspeth, was the widow of the writer Kenneth Grahame) he presented it to the nation for use by a Minister of the Crown.

In 1944, he was raised to the peerage "for philanthropic and public services". Having changed his surname to Courtauld-Thomson, he took the title of Baron Courtauld-Thomson, of Dorneywood in the County of Buckingham.

Thomson designed a diamond and pearl shell-shaped brooch (from 1918) that was given to his sister Winifred, and left by her to Queen Elizabeth the Queen Mother.

== Personal life and death ==
Lord Courtauld-Thomson died unmarried on 1 November 1954 at the King Edward VII Sanatorium, near Midhurst, Sussex, of which he had been chairman for 32 years. He was buried in the churchyard of St Anne's Church in Dropmore. The peerage became extinct on his death.

His sister Elspeth Thomson married Kenneth Grahame, author of The Wind in the Willows.

Peerage of the United Kingdom
New creation	Baron Courtauld-Thomson; 1944–1954	Extinct
