= Dorneywood =

English country house

Coordinates: 51.554434°N 0.648129°W

Dorneywood is an 18th-century house near Burnham in southern Buckinghamshire. Originally a Georgian farmhouse, it has Victorian and later additions, and following a fire in 1910, was remodelled in 1919 by Sir Robert Lorimer. It is a Grade II listed building.

It was given to the National Trust by Lord Courtauld-Thomson in 1947 as a grace-and-favour country home for a senior member of the Government, usually a secretary of state or minister of the Crown. The Dorneywood Trust has the objective of 'maintaining the mansion house and gardens of Dorneywood'.

== Occupancy of the house ==
The prime minister alone has the right to decide which minister or secretary of state is to occupy the house. In previous administrations it has been the residence of the chancellor of the exchequer and, prior to 31 May 2006, was occupied by Deputy Prime Minister John Prescott. Prescott was forced to relinquish occupancy of Dorneywood, following a series of scandals over an affair with civil servant Tracey Temple and a snatched paparazzi photograph of him playing croquet on the lawn of the property whilst the Prime Minister Tony Blair was out of the country on a visit to Washington. However, given the controversies over John Prescott's use of the house, senior politicians were reluctant to use it. The house was eventually taken over by Alistair Darling, Chancellor of the Exchequer when Gordon Brown became prime minister in 2007. "A spokesman for Mr Brown ... explained that the house ... was owned by a trust, and would revert first to the Lord Mayor of London and then to the American Ambassador, if the Chancellor did not want it."

Various former prime ministers (before achieving the premiership) have occupied the house, among them Anthony Eden. On becoming prime minister, Alec Douglas-Home was reluctant to forsake the more comfortable and modern Dorneywood for the antique splendours of Chequers. Another, James Callaghan as foreign secretary, also had the use of Dorneywood (later Chevening was to become the official country home for the holder of that office).

In 2010, George Osborne, the Chancellor of the Exchequer, took occupancy of the house. It was also used by Osborne's successors, Philip Hammond, Sajid Javid, Rishi Sunak, Jeremy Hunt, Rachel Reeves and John Healey.

== Interior ==
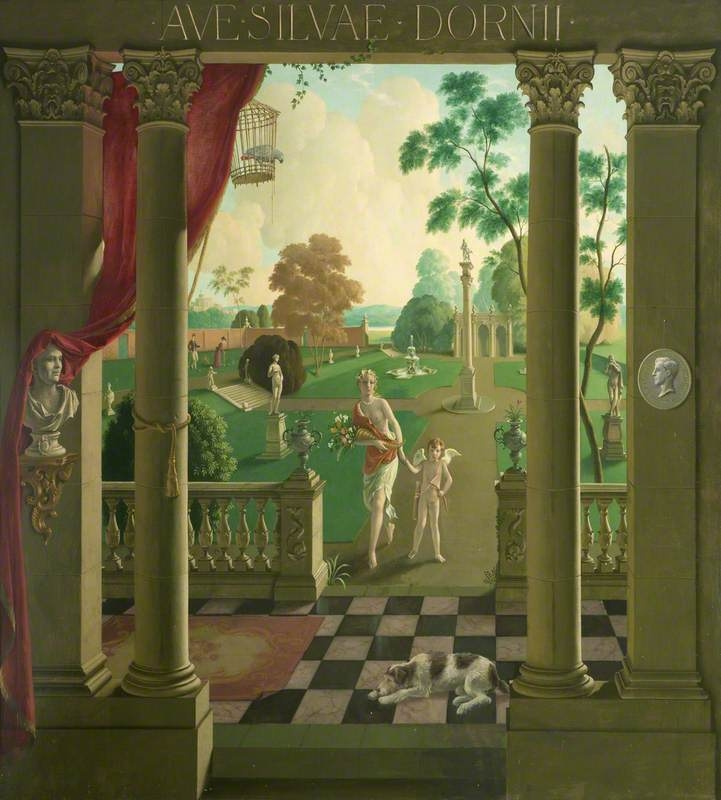
A Rex Whistler mural at Dorneywood

The interior of the house contains some decorations by Rex Whistler, as well as paintings and furniture belonging to the Government Art Collection. There is also furniture belonging to the National Trust.

== Grounds ==
The National Trust arranges public tours of the house and gardens during the summer. The estate consists of the house and 215 acres (87 ha) of parkland, woodland and farmland. The grounds are noted for their cottage and kitchen garden, as well as their herbaceous borders and rose displays. The upkeep of the estate is in part supported by the Dorneywood Thomson Endowment Trust Fund.

== See also ==
- Chequers, the British Prime Minister's official country retreat
- Chevening, the British Foreign Secretary's official country retreat
- List of official residences
