= Chequers Estate Act 1917 =

Act of the Parliament of the United Kingdom

Chequers Estate Act 1917 (Note: Section 4.)
- Act of Parliament
- Parliament of the United Kingdom
- Long title: An Act to confirm and give effect to a deed of settlement relating to the Chequers Estate and other property and for purposes connected therewith.
- Citation: 7 & 8 Geo. 5. c. 55
- Territorial extent: United Kingdom

Dates
- Royal assent: 20 December 1917
- Commencement: 20 December 1917 (Note: The Acts of Parliament (Commencement) Act 1793.)
Other legislation
Amended by	Ministry of Agriculture and Fisheries Act 1919; Chequers Estate Act 1958; Defence (Transfer of Functions) Act 1964; Agricultural Holdings Act 1986
Relates to	Ministers of the Crown Act 1937

Status: Amended

Text of statute as originally enacted

Revised text of statute as amended

Text of the Chequers Estate Act 1917 as in force today (including any amendments) within the United Kingdom, from legislation.gov.uk.

The Chequers Estate Act 1917 (7 & 8 Geo. 5. c. 55) is an act of the Parliament of the United Kingdom that designates Chequers as the official country residence of the prime minister of the United Kingdom. It was given royal assent on 20 December 1917.

The act was the first piece of legislation to recognise the existence of a Prime Minister even though the head of government had been referred to unofficially as "Prime Minister" since the early 18th century.

Part of the motivation for the act was the possibility that a future prime minister would not necessarily have their own stately home.
