= Beacon Hill, Colkirk, Norfolk =

High point in Norfolk, England

Coordinates: 52.8055°N 0.8232°E

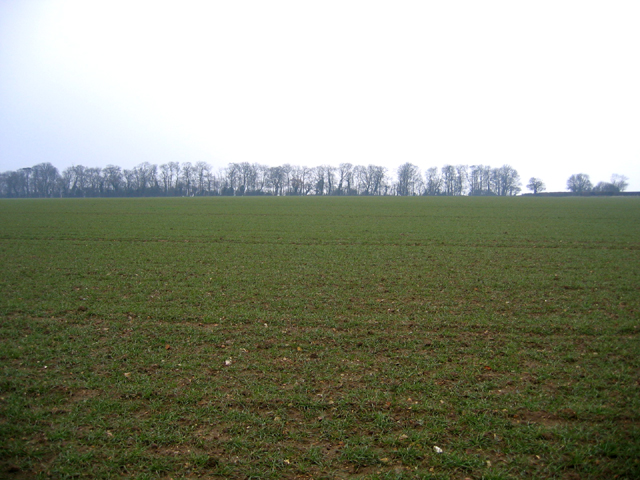
Long Belt, Beacon Hill, Colkirk, Norfolk.

Beacon Hill, Colkirk, Norfolk is a high point, once the site of a beacon forming part of a chain from the North Norfolk Coast to London. The approximate location of the beacon is two kilometres to the west of the village of Colkirk, N52:48:15 E0:49:29.
