= Signal Peak (Humboldt County, California) =

Mountain in California, United States

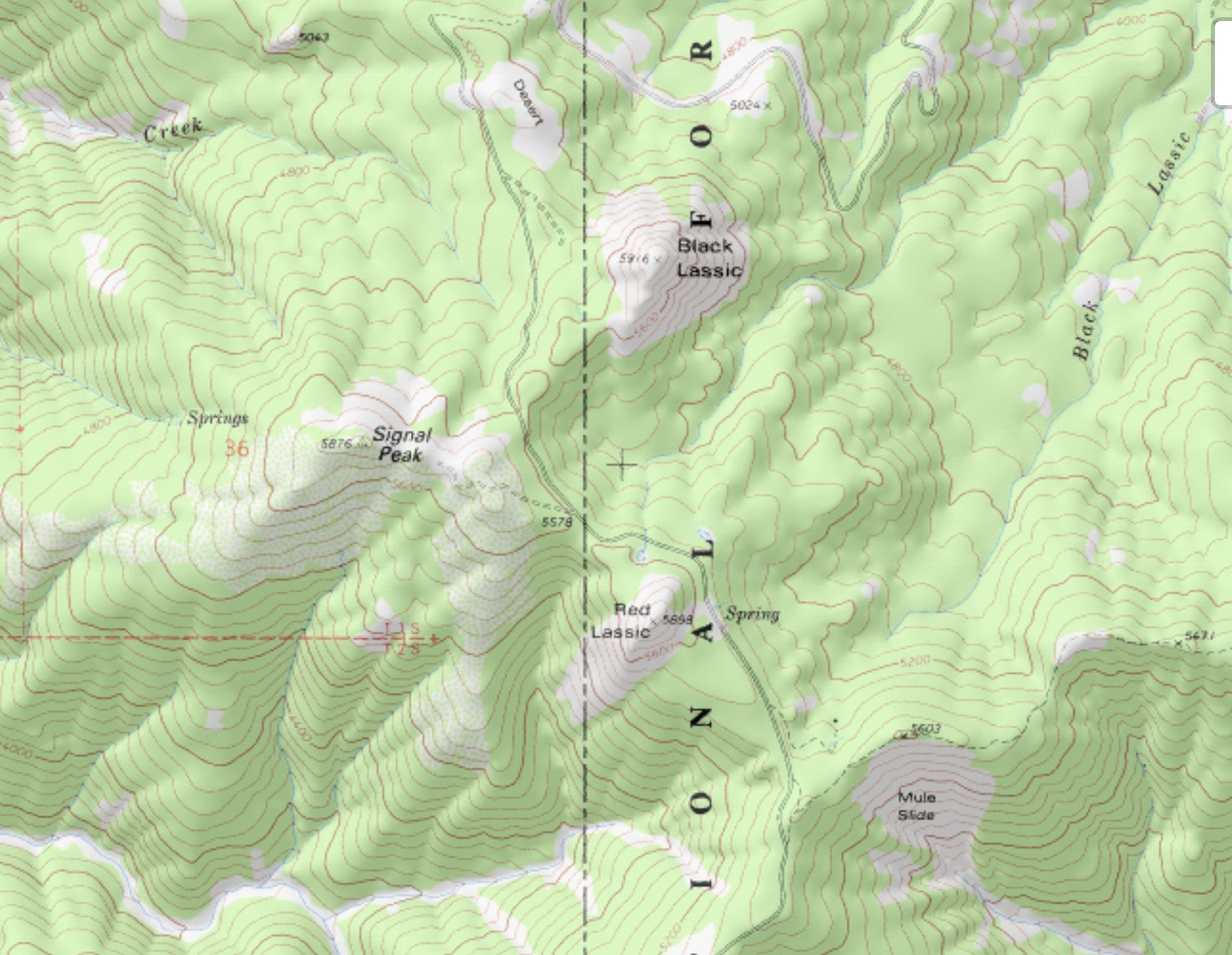
- Topo map of Black Lassic

Highest point
- Elevation: 5,880 ft (1,792 m) NAVD 88
- Prominence: 276 ft (80 m)
- Coordinates: 40°20′02″N 123°33′16″W

Geography
- Location within California
- Location: Humboldt County, California, U.S.
- Topo map: USGS Black Lassic

Climbing
- Easiest route: Jeep Trail

Signal Peak, or Mount Lassic, is a summit in the Coast Range of Humboldt County, California. Historically the peak was named for Lassic, a Native American leader during the Bald Hills War. There are two other summits in the area, Red Lassic and Black Lassic, that retain his name.

== History ==
The oldest name for this summit appears on an official 1898 map of the county, as Lassecks Peak, one spelling of Lassic's name, by which the local people knew the summit. Others are Lassek's Peak, Lassik's Peak and Lassic Peak.

The official name, Signal Peak, derives from the heliograph station that was located on this peak around 1900.

== Mount Lassic Wilderness ==
The 7,279 acres (2,946 ha) mountain and its surrounding area in Six Rivers National Forest were designated part of the National Wilderness Preservation System by the United States Congress in 2006. The summit of Signal Peak is the highest point in the wilderness which is managed by the U.S. Forest Service.
