= Beacon Hill, Saskatchewan =

Human settlement in Saskatchewan, Canada

Coordinates: 54°21′00″N 109°39′03″W

Beacon Hill is an unincorporated community in the Rural Municipality of Beaver River No. 622 in the province of Saskatchewan, Canada.
