= Signal Hill (British Columbia) =

Hill in British Columbia, Canada

Coordinates: 48°25′46″N 123°25′44″W

Signal Hill is a hill in Esquimalt, British Columbia, Canada, located on the south side of Constance Cove in CFB Esquimalt.

== See also ==
- Signal Hill (disambiguation)
- List of World War II-era fortifications on the British Columbia Coast
