= Beacon Hill, Buckinghamshire =

Hill near Penn and on the outskirts of High Wycombe Buckinghamshire

Coordinates: 51.628°N 0.684°W

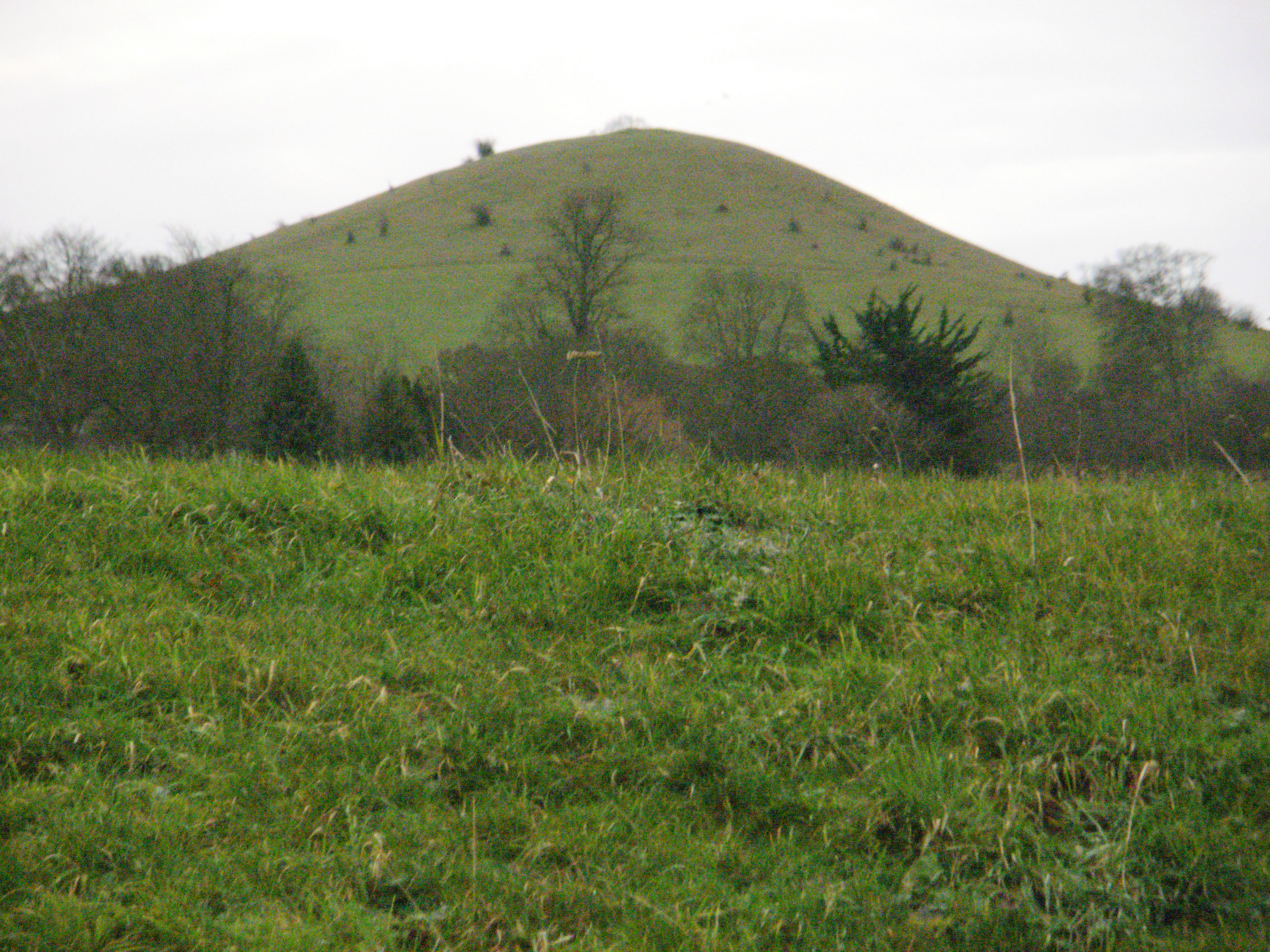
Beacon Hill from Springs Farm near Ellesborough.

The hamlet of Beacon Hill, is situated off the B474 near Penn and on the outskirts of High Wycombe Buckinghamshire. Nearby is the Golf Course at Wycombe Heights.

== Hill ==
Beacon Hill is named after a nearby hill in the Ivinghoe Hills range and shares the same name. It was surveyed at the order of the Duke of Bridgewater and was discovered to be 827 feet (252 m) high. The hill has a Bronze Age bowl barrow at the top and used to have a beacon on the top of it, with the iron lighter for it being stored in the nearby Church of England Church of St Peter and St Paul, Ellesborough. The beacon was replaced in the 19th century with a flagpole, which was then exchanged for a gun emplacement during the Second World War. It is a part of a National Trust trail which gives walkers views of Chequers, the country house of the prime minister of the United Kingdom.

Beacon Hill is also the location of Cymbeline's Castle where the Celtic King of the Britons Cunobeline according to legend, made a last stand against the Roman conquest of Britain in a fort located on the hill. However, Historic England has claimed this legend was a Victorian invention and that the castle was actually a Norman style Motte-and-bailey castle.

== Hamlet ==
The hamlet featured a Baptist chapel constructed at the highest point of it. The main road running through Beacon Hill is the boundary between the parishes of Penn and Tylers Green.
