= Beacon Hill Secondary School =

Coordinates: 34.045551°S 18.629627°E

Beacon Hill Secondary School is a school in the Western Cape.
