= Signal Mountain Trail =

Hiking trail in Wyoming, United States

Coordinates: 43°50′56″N 110°34′02″W

- Length: 3.4 mi (5.5 km)
- Location: Jackson Hole
- Trailheads: Signal Mountain Lodge
- Use: Hiking
- Elevation change: Approximate gain of 800 ft (240 m)
- Highest point: Signal Mountain, 7,700 ft (2,300 m)
- Lowest point: Signal Mountain Lodge, 6,800 ft (2,100 m)
- Difficulty: Moderate
- Season: Summer to Fall
- Sights: Teton Range; Jackson Hole
- Hazards: Severe weather

The Signal Mountain Trail is a 6.8-mile (10.9 km) long roundtrip hiking trail in Grand Teton National Park in the U.S. state of Wyoming. The trail begins near Signal Mountain Lodge on Jackson Lake and provides hiking access to the summit of Signal Mountain. The trail passes through Lodgepole Pine forests most of the way and the view from the summit of Signal Mountain provide sweeping views of the entire Teton Range and much of Jackson Hole.

== See also ==
- List of hiking trails in Grand Teton National Park
