= North Norfolk Coast biosphere reserve =

Situated north of Norwich on the Norfolk coast, the North Norfolk Coast biosphere reserve was a biosphere reserve until 2014 when its status was withdrawn. The area includes a wide range of habitats, from intertidal sands and muds, through shingle ridges, to saltwater and freshwater marshes. The saltmarshes are of great value for breeding and wintering wildfowl and includes a large breeding colony of common seals. Other habitats comprise mires, river valleys, heathlands, chalk and cliff-top grasslands, woodlands and farmland.

Many tourists frequent the area, notably for beach activities and birdwatching. There arises some pressure on specific sites due to these activities. Other activities within the biosphere reserve are the cultivation of mainly cereals and sugar beet, grazing and harvesting mussels, cockles, shrimps, crabs, and bait as well as some commercial shore-netting. Educational visits of school children and students take place and there are a number of interpretive and field centres in the area. Research covers a full range of biological sciences (and especially ornithology), and also relates to the geomorphology of coastal processes.

== Sources ==
This article incorporates text from a free content work (license statement/permission). Text taken from UNESCO - MAB Biosphere Reserves Directory, UNESCO, UNESCO.
