= Signal Mountain (Vermont) =

Mountain in Vermont, United States

Highest point
- Elevation: 3,370 feet (1,030 m)
- Prominence: 2,140 feet (650 m)
- Listing: #35 New England Fifty Finest
- Coordinates: 44°12.38′N 72°19.51′W

Geography
- Location: Caledonia County, Vermont, U.S.
- Topo map: USGS Knox Mountain

Climbing
- Easiest route: unmaintained hiking trail

Signal Mountain is a mountain located in Caledonia County, Vermont, in the Groton State Forest. Signal Mountain is flanked to the northwest by Spruce Mountain, and to the southwest by Butterfield Mountain.

The north side of Signal Mountain drains into Noyes Pond, thence into the South Branch of the Wells River, the upper Connecticut River, and into Long Island Sound in Connecticut. The east side drains into Heath Brook, thence into the South Branch of the Wells River. The south side drains into the Waits River, another tributary of the Connecticut. The west side drains into Great Brook, thence into the Winooski River, Lake Champlain, and ultimately into the Gulf of Saint Lawrence in Canada.

== See also ==
- List of mountains in Vermont
- New England Fifty Finest
