= Signal Mountain (Wyoming) =

Mountain in Wyoming, United States

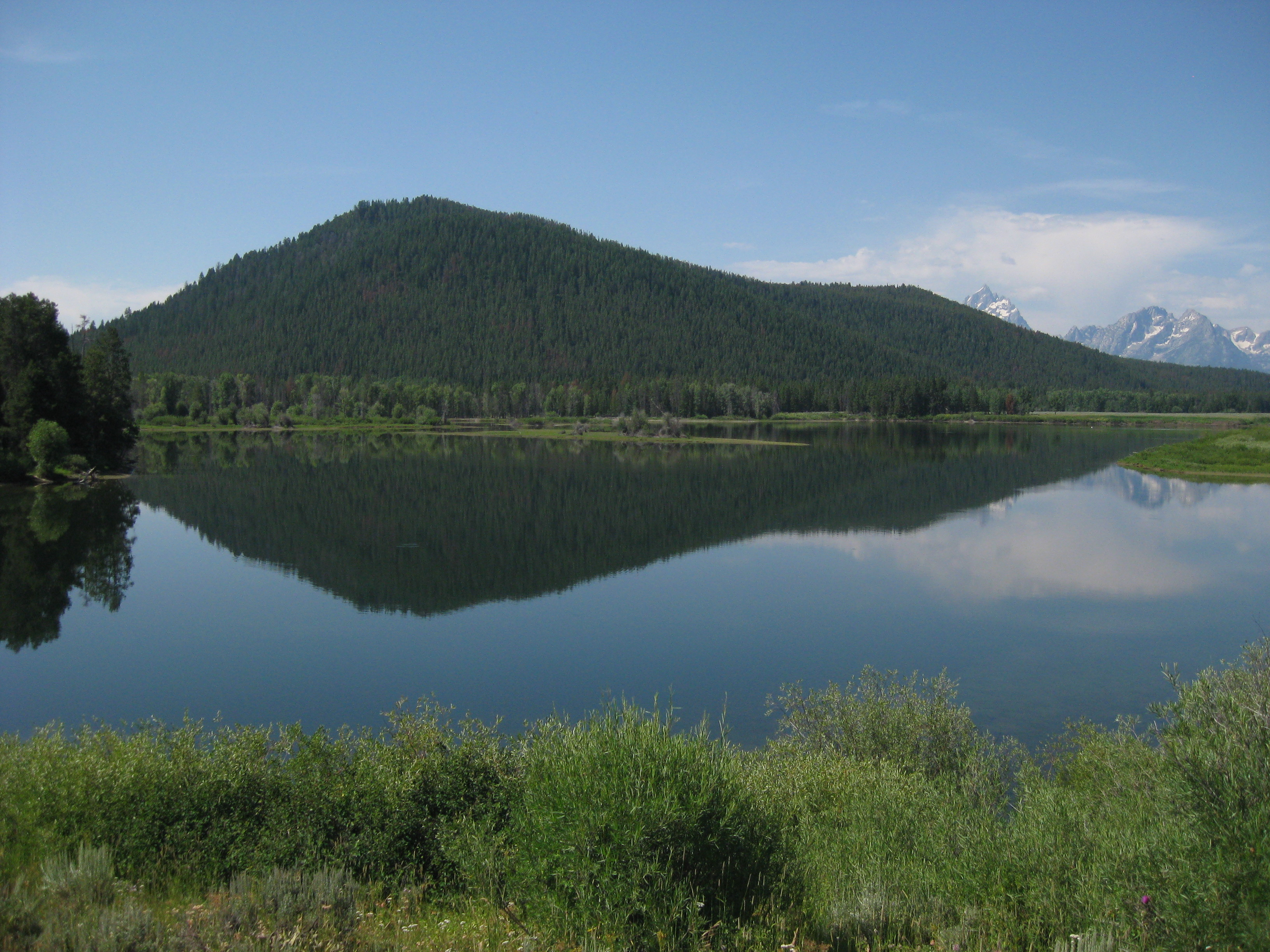
- Signal Mountain reflected in the Snake River

Highest point
- Elevation: 7,720 ft (2,350 m)
- Prominence: 890 ft (270 m)
- Coordinates: 43°50′56″N 110°34′02″W

Geography
- Location within Wyoming Location within the United States
- Location: Grand Teton National Park, Teton County, Wyoming, U.S.
- Topo map: USGS Moran (WY)

Climbing
- Easiest route: Hike

Signal Mountain is an isolated summit standing 7,720 feet (2,350 m) above sea level. The mountain is located in Grand Teton National Park in the U.S. state of Wyoming. The next closest higher summit is more than 10 miles (16 km) distant, and this isolation provides sweeping views of the Teton Range, much of the northern Jackson Hole area as well as the Snake River. Though located adjacent to the Tetons, Signal Mountain was not formed in the same manner or period. The mountain originally was formed by volcanic ashfall from one of the eruptions of the Yellowstone hotspot. The peak is also partially a glacial moraine formed by a receding glacier that came south out of the Yellowstone icecap. This same glacier also created neighboring Jackson Lake.

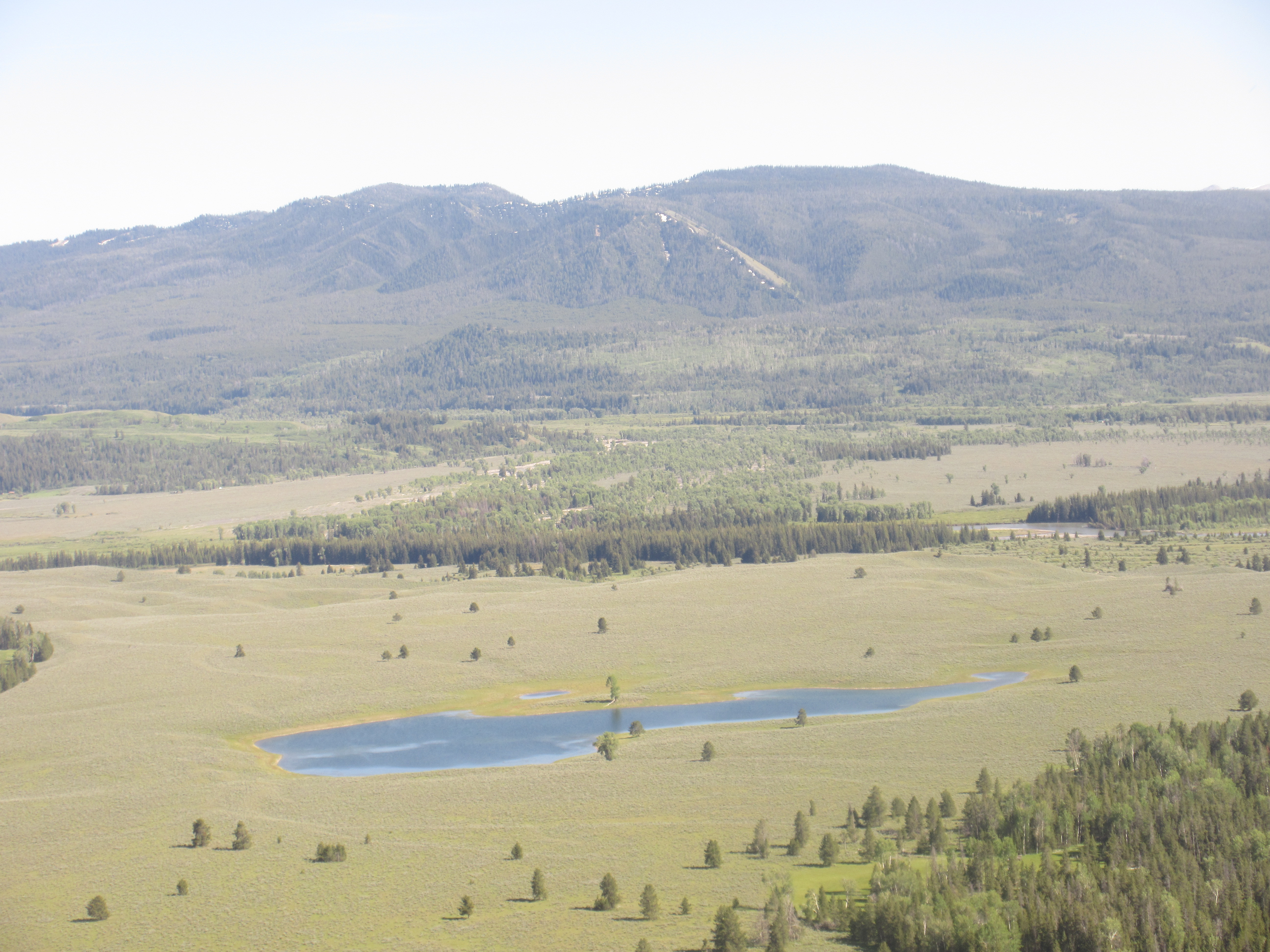
View from the summit.

Signal Mountain has a 5-mile (8.0 km) long road providing vehicular access to an observation area located just below the main summit. The Signal Mountain Trail is a hiking trail that goes from Signal Mountain Lodge to the summit and covers a distance of 6.8 miles (10.9 km). The trail splits mid-way for a portion of approximately 1.5 miles (2.4 km), allowing hikers to take either a trail along the lower part of the ridge or south of the ridge past a series of small ponds. The trails then rejoin and steepen over the last mile to reach the secondary summit of the mountain, the Jackson Lake Overlook. The trail rises approximately 800 feet (240 m) from the lodge to the overlook, though on the ridge trail there is quite a bit of up and down that adds a few hundred feet to the cumulative elevation gain. The trail is a hiking only trail, mountain biking and horseback riding are not permitted by the park service. The road is a popular biking destination due to the difficult climb up and then (after turning around at the summit) continuous downhill experienced on a 3.5-mile (5.6 km) portion of the road.

== See also ==
- Geology of the Grand Teton area
