= Signal Hill =

Signal Hill may refer to:

== Places ==
=== Canada ===
- Signal Hill, Calgary, neighborhood and hill in Calgary, Alberta
- Signal Hill-Quidi Vidi, provincial electoral district for the Newfoundland and Labrador House of Assembly
- Signal Hill, St. John's, a hill near St. John's, Newfoundland and Labrador
- Signal Hill (British Columbia), a shoreline hill at HMC Dockyard, Esquimalt, British Columbia

=== United States ===
- Signal Hill, the tallest point of Arkansas on the top of Mount Magazine
- Signal Hill, California, small town completely surrounded by Long Beach
- Signal Hill, Illinois, an unincorporated community
- Signal Hill (Canton, Massachusetts), a rocky knoll and open space preserve
- Signal Hill (Culpeper, Virginia), listed on the National Register of Historic Places in Culpeper County, Virginia
- Signal Hill (Prince William County, Virginia), listed on the National Register of Historic Places in Prince William County, Virginia

=== Other places ===
- Signal Hill (Antigua and Barbuda)
- Signal Hill (Cape Town), South Africa
- Signal Hill (England)
- Signal Hill, Kowloon, in the Tsim Sha Tsui area, Hong Kong also known as Blackhead Point
- Signal Hill (Lytton), in Brisbane, Queensland, Australia
- Signal Hill (New Zealand)
- Signal Hill (Qingdao), China

== Music ==
- Signal Hill (album), a 2002 album by Australian singer songwriter Monique Brumby

== See also ==
- Battle of Signal Hill, fought at St. John's, Newfoundland during the French and Indian War
- Signal Hill Elementary School (disambiguation)
- List of peaks named Signal
- Signalberg (disambiguation)
