= Sobey =

Sobey, Sobeys, or variation, may refer to:

== People ==
- The Sobey family, a prominent family of Canadian businessmen and art collectors
- Sobey Martin (1909–1978), an American director of television and short films

=== Surnamed ===
- David Sobey (1931–2023), Canadian businessman and son of Frank H. Sobey
- Frank H. Sobey (1902–1985), Canadian businessman and CEO of Sobeys
- John W. Sobey, founder of Sobey's and father to Frank Sobey
- Lianne Sobey, a Canadian curler from New Brunswick
- Nathan Sobey (born 1990), an Australian basketball player
- Wilf Sobey (1905–1988), English rugby union player
- William Sobey (1927–1989), Canadian businessman and son of Frank H. Sobey

== Places ==
- 14719 Sobey, an asteroid, named after DYSC awardee Glen Sobey
- Sobey School of Business, a business school in Halifax, Canada

== Other uses ==
- Sobeys, a Canadian retailer and supermarket conglomerate
- Sobey Foundation, an improvement foundation founded by Frank Sobey
- Sobey Art Foundation, an art foundation founded by Frank Sobey
- Sobey Art Award, Canada's largest prize for young Canadian artists
- Sobeys Slam, a former Grand Slam event of the Women's World Curling Tour, held in New Glasgow, Canada

== See also ==
- Sobeys Stores Ltd v Yeomans, a Canadian legal case from 1989
- Sobey Wall of Honour, Canadian Museum of Immigration, Pier 21, Halifax, Nova Scotia, Canada
