= Northumberland Regional High School =

Location
- 104 Alma Road; Westville, Nova Scotia, B0K 2A0; Canada; 45.5831°N 62.7584°W

Information
- School type: Public, High school
- Motto: "SOAR: Safety, Opportunity, Achievement, Respect"
- Founded: 2003
- School board: Chignecto-Central
- Principal: Matt O’Toole
- Grades: 9-12, CEP, IB
- Enrollment: 956 (2012)
- Language: English
- Colours: Red, white, and black
- Mascot: Squawk
- Team name: Northumberland Nighthawks
- Website: www.nrhs.ccrsb.ca

Northumberland Regional High School (NRHS) is a public high school located in Alma, Nova Scotia. Students that attend the school come from the western part of Pictou County, including the towns of Stellarton, and Westville. The school is administratively part of the "Celtic Region" in the Chignecto-Central Regional School Board. Its official colours are red, white and black and the mascot is a Nighthawk nicknamed "Squawk". The sports teams from NRHS are called the Northumberland Nighthawks.

== History ==
The school's athletic logo.

Northumberland Regional officially opened on November 25, 2003. It is one of three high schools of Pictou County, Nova Scotia (the other being North Nova Education Centre and Pictou Academy). It replaced West Pictou District High School, Stellarton High School, and Westville High School. NRHS has approximately 991 students from grades 9-12. Its student body is drawn from various schools including but not limited to; Dr. W A MacLeod Consolidated, West Pictou Consolidated School and Walter Duggan Consolidated

== Curriculum ==
NRHS offers a wide variety of courses to its student body, with about 130 courses (excluding grade 9 and CEP courses). These courses include math (essentials-, foundations-, academic-, and advanced-level; this includes calculus), sciences (chemistry, physics, biology, etc.), languages (English and French), fine arts and technology (drama, visual arts, film and video, communications technology, etc.), and phys ed (mostly introduced in 2008; phys ed yoga, phys ed leadership). Also, NRHS has the Career and Employment Preparation (CEP) which offers courses to introduce students directly to industries such as food services, auto care, forestry, and retail; although this program is considered an alternative to academic courses, many students that complete the program go to university. NRHS primarily focuses on math and sciences over fine arts.

=== International Baccalaureate ===
NRHS is the first, and currently only, school in Pictou County to offer the International Baccalaureate Diploma Programme. It officially became an IB World School on April 21, 2007. NRHS offers the diploma program in English and Immersion-level (high level) French.

== Facilities ==
The NRHS campus is located in Alma, Nova Scotia. Its facilities include:

- over one hundred classrooms, some of which contain SmartBoards, the others equipped with overhead projectors linked to the teacher's main computer,
- Several chemistry labs;
- An automotive lab (used for CEP);
- A retail store (also for CEP);
- A kitchen (also for CEP);
- A 350-seat theatre/auditorium;
- Four major computer labs (including a lab specifically for film editing featuring a green-screen, iMacs, and Mac Pros);
- Four smaller computer labs called "pods", each equipped with ~10 computers and a laser printer;
- Seminar room fully equipped with computers;
- A large library with an attached seminar room;
- An outdoor classroom which is commonly used in spring time;
- A weights room for students to use during their spare time, such as at lunch or during free-periods;
- A large gymnasium; and
- A teen health center (with a public health nurse).
- SchoolPlus Hub Site for Pictou County West SchoolsPlus (with a social worker and outreach worker)

== Extra-curricular activities ==
=== Students' Council ===
NRHS has an active Students' Council with over 80 members who raise a large amount of money each year for the school community. The Students' Council funds sports facilities, supports dances and many other events held throughout the school year.

The Students' Council is voluntary and is administered by an executive featuring two co-presidents (elected by the student population) as well as several committee heads and a staff adviser. The executive handles the major decision making of the council and keeps track of finances. The executive also discusses, approves, or declines fundraising proposals for various sports teams and other activities, as well as the formation of new clubs and committees.

=== Clubs, committees, and sports ===
NRHS offers many extra-curricular activities, such as: Communications, Interact, Yearbook (part of the Publishing 12 course), and Environmental club. Other activities include dance, fine arts, anime, debate and gaming. NRHS also has many sports teams, including: rugby, basketball, hockey, volleyball, cross country running, track, and soccer.
