= Amherst High School =

Amherst High School may refer to:

== In Canada ==
- Amherst Regional High School (Nova Scotia), Amherst, Nova Scotia

== In the United States ==
- Amherst High School (Nebraska), Amherst, Nebraska
- Amherst High School (Wisconsin), Amherst, Wisconsin
- Amherst Central High School, Amherst, New York
- Amherst County High School, Amherst, Virginia
- Amherst Regional High School (Massachusetts), Amherst, Massachusetts
- Marion L. Steele High School (a.k.a. Amherst Steele High School), Amherst, Ohio
