= Highland Square =

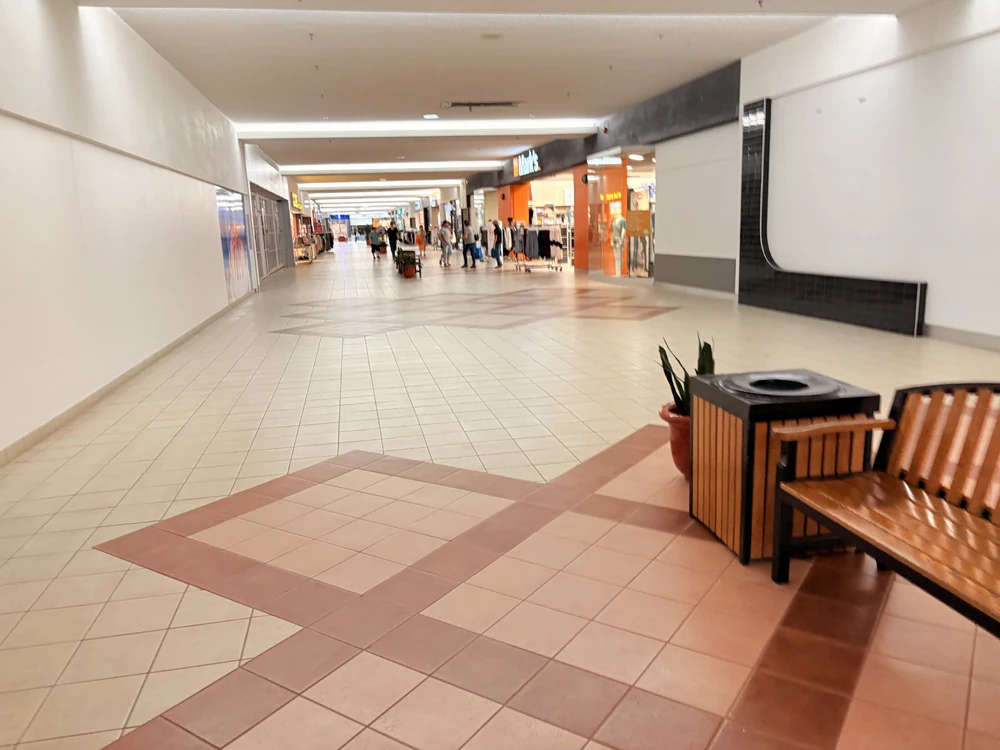
- Mall interior (2025)
- Location: New Glasgow, Nova Scotia, Canada
- Coordinates: 45°34′44.8″N 62°39′50.5″W
- Address: 689 Westville Road, New Glasgow, NS B2H 2J6
- Opened: February 3, 1981
- Manager: Crombie REIT
- Owner: Crombie REIT
- Num. of anchor tenants: 6
- Floor area: 200,000 sq. ft.
- Floors: 1
- Website: www.highlandsquare.ca

Highland Square is a shopping mall in New Glasgow, Nova Scotia, Canada. Located off the Trans-Canada Highway, it is the only enclosed shopping mall in Pictou County, acting as a regional shopping centre.

== History ==
The mall opened on February 3, 1981 with three anchor tenants, Dominion, Canadian Tire and Woolco.

Dominion closed all Nova Scotian locations in 1985. Sobeys moved in during the late 1980s.

The mall underwent a major expansion in 1986, adding Sears as a new anchor tenant along with many new tenant spaces. Sears permanently closed on September 20, 2016.

Sobeys shuttered on May 31, 2006, sitting vacant for the next year.

Walmart moved from its original location to an outparcel in 2007, resulting in the demolition of Sears. Canadian Tire later moved into the old store, while Sears moved into the old Sobeys space. The original Canadian Tire became Winners in 2009.

== Stores ==
Highland Square houses over 60 tenant spaces in total, though approximately half are vacant.

Anchor tenants:

- Canadian Tire (78,000 sq. ft.)
- PetSmart (14,001 sq. ft.)
- Sport Chek (15,789 sq. ft.)
- Walmart Supercentre - outparcel (120,000 sq. ft.)
- Winners (23,003 sq. ft.)

Notable former tenants:

- Consumers Distributing, closed in 1996, now multiple tenants.
- Dominion, now Great Canadian Dollar Store and PetSmart.
- Future Shop, currently Highland Health Home and Learning Centre.
- Michaels, closed in January 2021, now vacant.
- Sears, first location demolished for new Walmart, second location now Great Canadian Dollar Store and PetSmart.
- Shoppers Drug Mart, closed in 2004, now multiple tenants.
- Sobeys, closed on May 31, 2006, now Great Canadian Dollar Store and PetSmart.
- Woolco, converted to Walmart in March 1994.

== Public transportation ==
Highland Square is served by Pictou County Transit bus service, Route 1 includes a stop in front of the main entrance.

== See also ==
- List of shopping malls in Canada
