= PDHS =

PDHS may refer to:

- Palm Desert High School, Palm Desert, California, United States
- Pakistan Demographic and Health Survey
- Paris District High School, Paris, Ontario, Canada
- Pugwash District High School, Pugwash, Nova Scotia, Canada
