= Frank Sobey: The Man and the Empire =

1985 biography by Harry Bruce

- Title page for Frank Sobey: The Man and the Empire (1985)
- Author: Harry Bruce
- Language: English
- Subject: Frank Sobey
- Genre: Biography
- Published: 1985 (Macmillan of Canada)
- Publication place: Canada
- Media type: Print (hardcover)
- Pages: 443
- ISBN: 978-0-9208-5262-0
- OCLC: 12388767

Frank Sobey: The Man and the Empire is a 1985 biography by Harry Bruce, chronicling the life of the Frank Sobey, a Canadian businessman from Nova Scotia. The book was generally well-received, though academic reviews have noted constraints in the scope of its content.

== Synopsis ==
Frank Sobey was a Canadian businessman born in 1902 in Lyons Brook, Nova Scotia. The book details Sobey's experience expanding his father's small butcher shop in Stellarton into a large and diverse company encompassing over 60 Sobeys supermarkets across Atlantic Canada and Quebec, as well as pharmacies, food processing operations, real estate, and movie theatres, generating CAD$755 million in revenue by 1984. The book highlights Sobey's work ethic, frugality, and strategic use of borrowed funds, particularly during a period of aggressive growth during the 1940s, with significant expansion of the company taking place between 1945 and 1950. Sobey is portrayed as a community-oriented figure with a commitment to Stellarton, where he served as unpaid mayor for 22 years from 1937 to 1959. The book also covers Sobey's time as president of Industrial Estates Limited, a Nova Scotia Crown corporation with the aim of attracting investments to the province.

== Composition and publication ==
The book is a commissioned work which was financed by Donald Sobey, the youngest of Frank Sobey's three sons. Prior to publication, Bruce read the entire finished manuscript aloud to Frank Sobey, and later remarked in his 2020 book Halifax and Me that the only changes Sobey requested were not related to himself but to the people of Pictou County.

It was published in 1985 by Macmillan of Canada as a hardcover edition with 443 pages. The book includes illustrations and a bibliography.

== Reception ==
Frank Sobey: The Man and the Empire was generally well-received by critics. William Smith of the Telegraph-Journal described it as an "interesting and important book" and said it contains "penetrating insights into the practical problems of expanding the private sector of the region's economy". Hubert Bauch of the Montreal Gazette wrote that "Frank Sobey's story should be required reading for anyone with dreams of taking a modest venture for a ride into the corporate stratosphere", and described Bruce's prose as "at once lively and smooth". The book was the runner-up for the first National Business Book Award.

Academic critiques of the book have noted limitations. Margaret McCallum argues in a 1991 article in Acadiensis that the book lacks critical analysis, focusing on Sobey's personal attributes rather than the broader contexts of his life. McCallum notes that while the book does acknowledge the failures of Industrial Estates Limited, it emphasizes the successes of the corporation such as the Michelin tire plants, potentially downplaying challenges such as the Clairtone and Deuterium plants. The book also mentions labour disputes associated with Sobey's businesses, but does not provide a comprehensive account of these issues.

== See also ==
- Harry Bruce bibliography
- Literature of Nova Scotia
- Sobey family
