= ARHS =

ARHS may refer to:

== Schools ==
- Algonquin Regional High School, Northborough, Massachusetts
- Amherst Regional High School (Amherst, Massachusetts)
- Amherst Regional High School (Amherst, Nova Scotia)
- Apponequet Regional High School, Lakeville, Massachusetts
- Archbishop Riordan High School, San Francisco, California
- Ashley Ridge High School, Summerville, South Carolina
- Auburn Riverside High School, Auburn, Washington

== Historical societies ==
- Anthracite Railroads Historical Society, Pennsylvania, United States
- Australian Railway Historical Society

== Other ==
- Arhaus, an American furniture retailer, by Nasdaq stock symbol
