= West Pictou Consolidated School =

Location
- 1959 Highway 376; Lyons Brook, Nova Scotia, B0K 1H0; Canada
- Coordinates: 45.6562°N 62.7965°W

Information
- School board: Chignecto-Central Regional School Board
- Grades: K-8
- Enrollment: 440 (2009)
- Language: English and French immersion
- Area: central-western Pictou County
- Team name: Wolverines
- Website: wpc.ccrsb.ca

West Pictou Consolidated School (WPCS) is a Canadian public school serving the central-western part of Pictou County, Nova Scotia.

The school is located in the rural community of Lyons Brook. WPCS had 440 students enrolled in grades K-8 as of 2009.

The school was established in the 1950s in a white painted wood-framed structure located at the corner of present-day Stewart Rd and Highway 376. The West Pictou District High School was established next door in the 1960s. In 2005 the high school building was vacated after Northumberland Regional High School opened; that year saw WPCS move into the old high school building and the original WPCS building was demolished.

In 2011 the Government of Nova Scotia budgeted $3.9 million in capital funding toward upgrades at WPCS, to be implemented in several phases in order to make the building, built in the early 1960s as a high school, more appropriate for a K-8 school. Chignecto-Central Regional School Board stated that as of January 2013, $1.7 million had been spent to upgrade the building's boiler, sewage service, water supply, gymnasium floor, locker rooms, hallway fire doors, bathrooms, parking lot, and school bus loop. Remaining projects include renovations to the creative technology facilities (industrial arts workshop, art room, learning commons/technical space), library, office and administrative areas, and entrance doors.

== Notable students ==
These individuals attended the now-closed West Pictou District High School. The building is now used by West Pictou Consolidated School.

- George Canyon - country singer
- J. D. Fortune - rock band INXS lead singer, but dropped out before graduating.
- Joey MacDonald - retired NHL hockey player
