= Springhill High School (Nova Scotia) =

Springhill Junior-Senior High School

Location
- 84 Church Street; Springhill, Nova Scotia; Canada
- Coordinates: 45.6455°N 64.0567°W

Information
- Type: High School
- Principal: Ryan Oulton
- Officer in charge: Mr. Ethier
- Faculty: 22
- Grades: 7-12
- Enrollment: 250
- Colors: Burgundy and Gold
- Athletics: Soccer, Golf, Cross-Country, Basketball, Badminton, Table Tennis, Track and Field
- Mascot: Golden Eagle
- Website: shs.ccrce.ca

Springhill High School (SHS) is a secondary school in Springhill, Nova Scotia, Canada. SHS is part of the Chignecto-Central Regional Centre for Education and is the only high school in the town of Springhill.
