= New Glasgow =

New Glasgow Glaschu Úr (Scottish Gaelic)
- Town
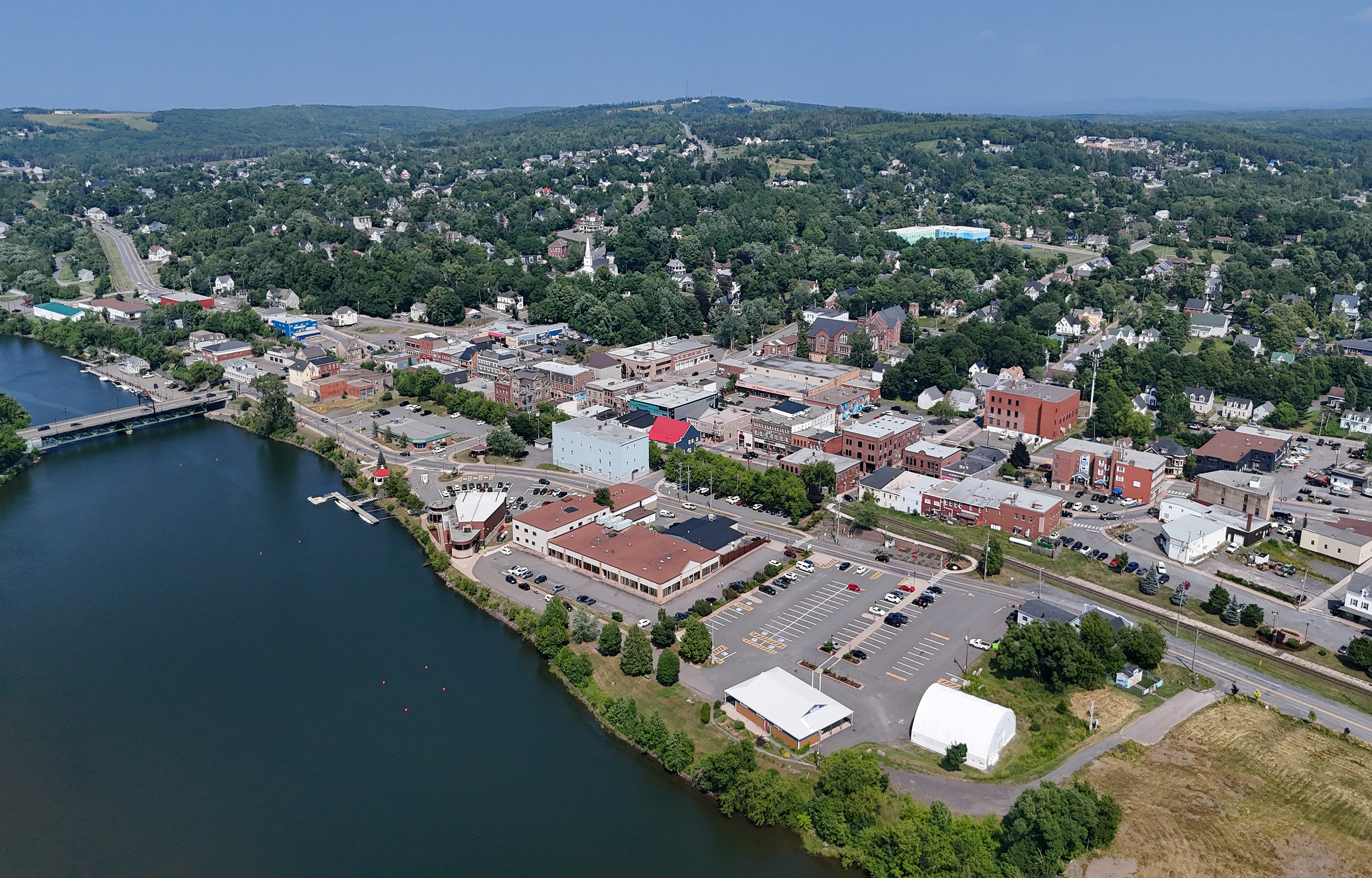
- Aerial view of downtown

- Coat of arms
- Motto: Let New Glasgow Flourish
- Location of New Glasgow in
- Coordinates: 45.59256°N 62.645458°W
- Country: Canada
- Province: Nova Scotia
- County: Pictou
- Founded: 1776

Government
  - Type: New Glasgow Council
  - Mayor: Nancy Dicks
  - MLA: Danny MacGillvrey (PC)
  - MP: Sean Fraser (L)

Area (2021)
  - Land: 9.96 km^{2} (3.85 sq mi)
  - Urban: 29.82 km^{2} (11.51 sq mi)
  - Metro: 2,066.47 km^{2} (797.87 sq mi)
- Elevation: 6 m (20 ft)

Population (2021)
  - Town: 9,471
  - Density: 951.3/km^{2} (2,464/sq mi)
  - Urban: 19,316
  - Urban density: 647.8/km^{2} (1,678/sq mi)
  - Metro: 34,397
  - Metro density: 16.6/km^{2} (43/sq mi)
  - Change 2016–21: ▲4.4%
  - Census Ranking (2016): 445 of 5,162
- Demonym: New Glaswegian
- Time zone: UTC– 04:00 (AST)
  - Summer (DST): UTC– 03:00 (ADT)
- Postal code(s): B2H
- Area code: 902: 301 331 419 507 513 600 601 616 695 752 753 754 755 759 771 921 928 931 934 952 967
- Dwellings: 4,782
- Median Income*: $58,000 CDN
- Website: www.newglasgow.ca
- Median household income, 2020 (all households)

New Glasgow is a town in Pictou County, in the province of Nova Scotia, Canada. It is situated on the banks of the East River of Pictou, which flows into Pictou Harbour, a sub-basin of the Northumberland Strait.

The town's population was 9,471 in the 2021 census. New Glasgow is at the centre of the province's fourth largest urban area; the population of the New Glasgow census agglomeration in the 2021 census was 34,397. The New Glasgow census agglomeration includes the smaller adjacent towns of Stellarton, Westville, and Trenton as well as adjacent rural areas of the county.

== History ==
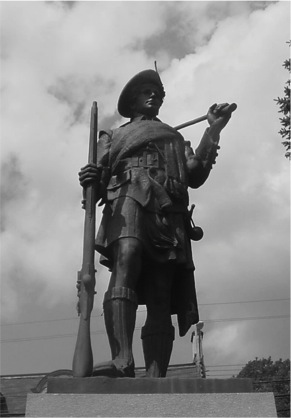
Hector Pioneer by sculptor John A. Wilson of New Glasgow, Nova Scotia (Wilson donated land for the Aberdeen Regional Hospital)

Scottish immigrants, including those on the ship Hector in 1773, settled the area of the East River of Pictou during the late 18th and early 19th centuries.

Deacon Thomas Fraser first settled the area at the head of navigation on the East River of Pictou in 1784. The settlement was officially named "New Glasgow", after Glasgow in Scotland, in 1809, the same year its first trading post was developed.

The discovery of large coal deposits in the East River valley during the early 19th century saw New Glasgow, at the head of navigation, quickly develop into a manufacturing and port community.

In 1829, a horse-drawn tramway was built using standard gauge rails from the settlement of Albion Mines (now Stellarton) to a wharf near New Glasgow. This was the first use of standard gauge rails in what would become Canada. On September 19, 1839, the Albion Railway was opened from Albion Mines to New Glasgow, hauling coal wagons behind steam locomotives such as the Samson along the west bank of the East River of Pictou. This was the second steam-powered railway in what would become Canada, and the first to use iron rails. The railway was extended north to a coal loading pier at Dunbar's Point on May 14, 1840.

In 1840, George MacKenzie started the town's first shipbuilding company, which eventually built or owned 34 vessels; hundreds of ships would later be built along the East River in New Glasgow. In 1861 the clipper ship Sebastopol was built.

In June 1867, the Nova Scotia Railway opened its "Eastern Line" from Truro through New Glasgow to its terminus at the passenger and cargo wharf in Pictou Landing. In 1882 the "Eastern Extension" of the Intercolonial Railway was opened from New Glasgow to Mulgrave on the Strait of Canso, placing New Glasgow on the mainline between Cape Breton Island and the North American rail network.

Economic development in New Glasgow was driven by the steel industry in neighbouring Trenton (site of the first steel manufacturing in Canada), shipbuilding and shipping in Pictou and Pictou Landing, and coal mining in Stellarton and Westville.

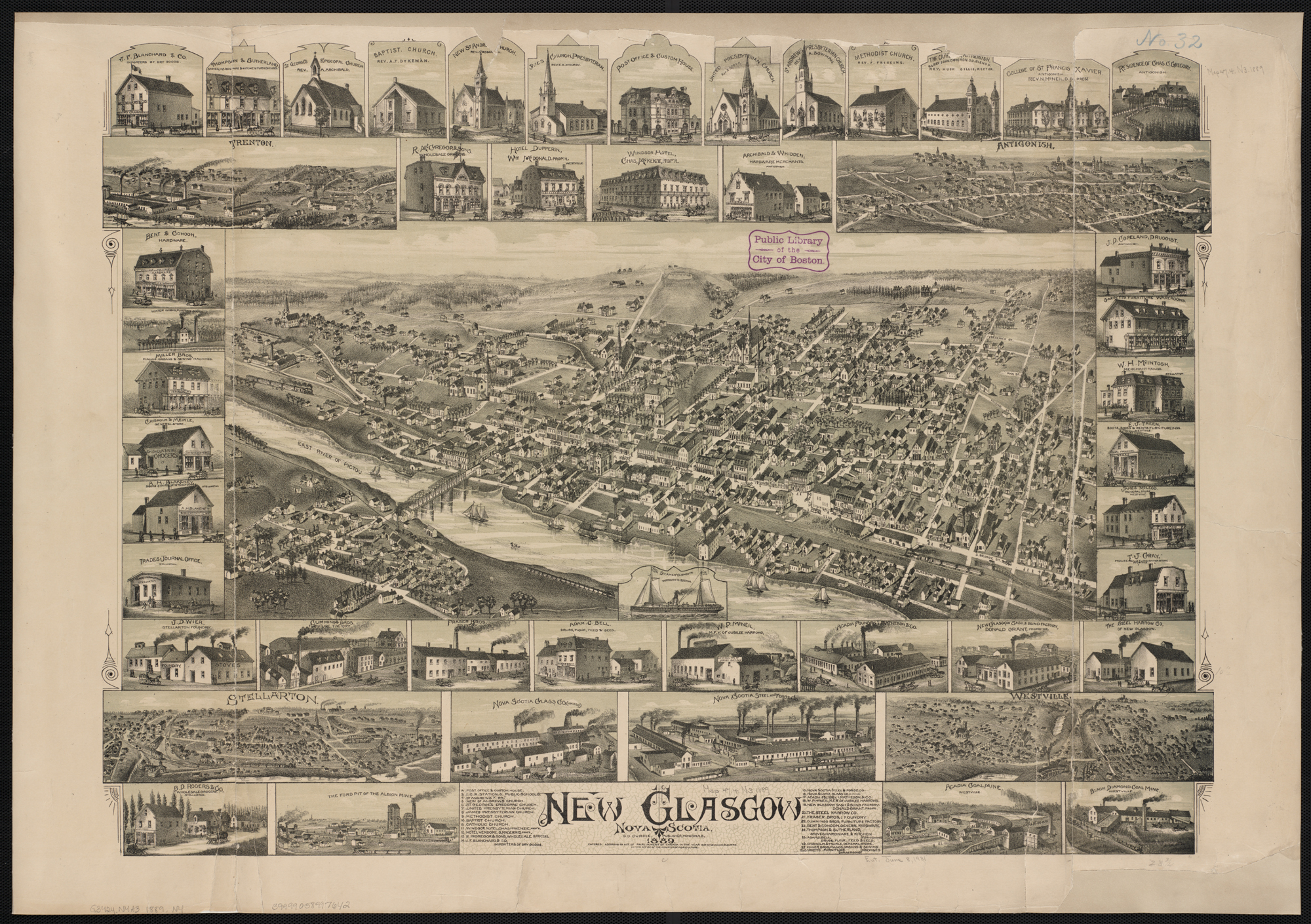
New Glasgow map 1889

After World War I, the famous New York sculptor J. Massey Rhind was commissioned to make the Nova Scotia Highlander soldier cenotaph. In 1946, New Glasgow was the setting for an important civil rights case when Viola Desmond challenged racial segregation of New Glasgow's Roseland Theatre. New Glasgow became a service centre for the county during the late 20th century as shopping centres, retail and residential development was spurred by the construction of Highway 104.

=== Municipal amalgamation ===
Talk of amalgamating the six municipal units in Pictou County has increased in recent years. Among the reasons for this, small towns adjacent to New Glasgow are having a hard time coping financially on their own due to the declining economy. Also, Pictou County has the most politicians per capita in Canada. With the Government of Nova Scotia having already amalgamated Halifax County, Cape Breton County, and Queens County into regional municipalities, Pictou County residents feel it is only a matter of time before that concept is introduced in Pictou County. The two most often suggested scenarios involve amalgamating the entire county (six municipalities) into a single regional municipality, or amalgamating the upper East River towns (New Glasgow, Stellarton, Trenton, Westville) into a single larger town. After several months of public backlash a vote was held and the public spoke against amalgamation, effectively killing any possibility of a future merger.

== Geography ==
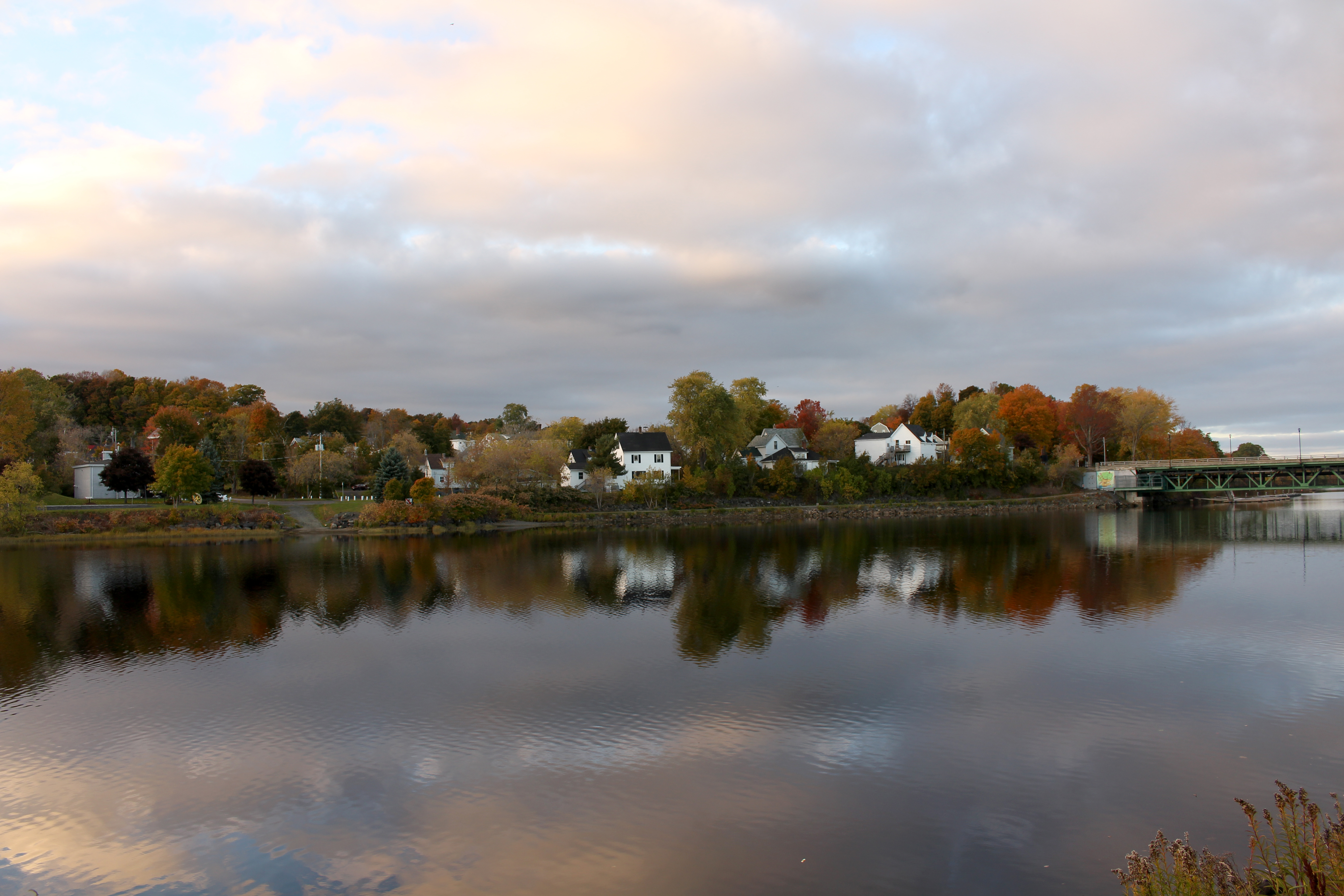
New Glasgow riverfront

New Glasgow is located on Nova Scotia's north shore, 165 km (103 mi) northeast of Halifax, 110 km (68 mi) west of the Canso Causeway to Cape Breton and 20 km (12 mi) south of the Prince Edward Island ferry at Caribou. The town can be easily accessed from several exits off the Trans Canada Highway. It is in the Atlantic Time Zone, four hours behind UTC.

New Glasgow is divided by the East River (north – south), a tidal estuary with brackish (salt and fresh) water. The three lane George Street bridge is the only vehicle crossing within town limits and is considered the main entrance into the downtown core on the east side of the river. The closest bridges out of town are the Trenton Connector to the north, the Trans Canada Highway to the south and Bridge Avenue (Stellarton) also to the south.

=== Climate ===
Köppen-Geiger climate classification system classifies New Glasgow's climate as humid continental (Dfb), with rainy and snowy cold winters and warm humid summers. The highest temperature ever recorded in New Glasgow was 36.0 °C (97 °F) on 10 August 2001. The coldest temperature ever recorded was −39.4 °C (−39 °F) on 2 February 1961.

Climate data for Lyons Brook, 1981–2010 normals, extremes 1945–present (Note: Climate data was recorded at New Glasgow from July 1945 to December 1950, at Stellarton from February 1952 to December 1976, and at Lyons Brook from June 1984 to present.)
Month	Jan	Feb	Mar	Apr	May	Jun	Jul	Aug	Sep	Oct	Nov	Dec	Year
Record high °C (°F)	17.0 (62.6)	17.5 (63.5)	28.0 (82.4)	29.0 (84.2)	33.0 (91.4)	34.0 (93.2)	34.4 (93.9)	36.0 (96.8)	34.5 (94.1)	27.8 (82.0)	22.8 (73.0)	18.0 (64.4)	36.0 (96.8)
Mean daily maximum °C (°F)	−1.5 (29.3)	−1.1 (30.0)	2.9 (37.2)	8.6 (47.5)	15.6 (60.1)	20.9 (69.6)	24.8 (76.6)	24.5 (76.1)	20.0 (68.0)	13.7 (56.7)	7.4 (45.3)	1.5 (34.7)	11.4 (52.5)
Daily mean °C (°F)	−6.2 (20.8)	−5.9 (21.4)	−1.7 (28.9)	4.2 (39.6)	10.2 (50.4)	15.3 (59.5)	19.3 (66.7)	19.1 (66.4)	14.8 (58.6)	9.2 (48.6)	3.7 (38.7)	−2.5 (27.5)	6.6 (43.9)
Mean daily minimum °C (°F)	−11.0 (12.2)	−10.7 (12.7)	−6.2 (20.8)	−0.3 (31.5)	4.7 (40.5)	9.7 (49.5)	13.8 (56.8)	13.6 (56.5)	9.6 (49.3)	4.7 (40.5)	0.0 (32.0)	−6.5 (20.3)	1.8 (35.2)
Record low °C (°F)	−32.8 (−27.0)	−39.4 (−38.9)	−29.4 (−20.9)	−13.9 (7.0)	−6.7 (19.9)	−3.9 (25.0)	1.7 (35.1)	1.1 (34.0)	−5.6 (21.9)	−7.8 (18.0)	−14.0 (6.8)	−30.0 (−22.0)	−39.4 (−38.9)
Average precipitation mm (inches)	109.7 (4.32)	94.7 (3.73)	100.3 (3.95)	93.7 (3.69)	83.9 (3.30)	89.7 (3.53)	76.6 (3.02)	81.4 (3.20)	117.6 (4.63)	128.6 (5.06)	135.1 (5.32)	121.1 (4.77)	1,232.2 (48.51)
Average rainfall mm (inches)	40.2 (1.58)	31.6 (1.24)	50.4 (1.98)	74.3 (2.93)	82.7 (3.26)	89.7 (3.53)	76.6 (3.02)	81.4 (3.20)	117.6 (4.63)	128.1 (5.04)	117.5 (4.63)	63.2 (2.49)	953.3 (37.53)
Average snowfall cm (inches)	69.6 (27.4)	63.1 (24.8)	49.9 (19.6)	19.3 (7.6)	1.2 (0.5)	0.0 (0.0)	0.0 (0.0)	0.0 (0.0)	0.0 (0.0)	0.4 (0.2)	17.6 (6.9)	57.9 (22.8)	279.0 (109.8)
Source: Environment Canada

== Demographics ==
Historical population
Year	Pop.	±%
1871	1,676	—
1881	2,595	+54.8%
1891	3,776	+45.5%
1901	4,447	+17.8%
1911	6,383	+43.5%
1921	8,974	+40.6%
1931	8,858	−1.3%
1941	9,210	+4.0%
1951	10,433	+13.3%
1956	9,998	−4.2%
1961	9,782	−2.2%
1971	10,849	+10.9%
1981	10,464	−3.5%
1991	9,905	−5.3%
2001	9,432	−4.8%
2011	9,562	+1.4%
2016	9,075	−5.1%
2021	9,471	+4.4%

In the 2021 Census of Population conducted by Statistics Canada, New Glasgow had a population of 9,471 living in 4,445 of its 4,782 total private dwellings, a change of 4.4% from its 2016 population of 9,075. With a land area of 9.96 km^{2} (3.85 sq mi), it had a population density of 950.9/km^{2} (2,462.8/sq mi) in 2021.

Mother tongue language (2006)

Language	Population	Pct (%)
English only	8,980	97.66%
Other languages	120	1.31%
French only	95	1.03%
Both English and French	0	0.00%

=== Neighbourhoods ===
South End

The southeastern part of the town is located on the east bank of the East River, immediately north of the unincorporated community of Plymouth and west of the unincorporated community of Priestville. It is largely commercial and centred upon East River Road (signed as Route 348).

The Aberdeen Hospital, New Glasgow business park, New Glasgow Police headquarters, North Nova Education Centre and the Aberdeen Shopping Centre are situated here as well as a residential area.

Downtown

Located on the east bank of the East River and centred on the George Street Bridge, the downtown core has a central business district along Provost Street and Archimedes Street. Banks, insurance companies, law firms, accounting firms, engineering companies, restaurants and independent retailers are located in historic buildings along these streets.

Formerly industrial, the downtown area along the river has undergone a waterfront revitalization in recent decades as factories and foundries closed and were replaced by a performing arts centre, office buildings and a marina. Currently, only one foundry and several warehouses and a cement plant remain along the rail corridor in this area.

East Side

The east end is the area east of downtown and is bordered on the east by the unincorporated communities of Frasers Mountain and Linacy. It is largely residential.

North End

The northeastern part of the town stretches along the east bank of the East River from the downtown to the border with Trenton.

West Side

The west side of the town is located on the west bank of the East River, consists of a residential area north of George Street through to the unincorporated community of Abercrombie.

The area of the West Side southwest of George Street along Westville Road is a commercial area and includes the Highland Square Mall as well as a district of big box stores. This part of the town borders the town of Stellarton to the south and the Town of Westville to the southwest. Westville Road leads to the town of Westville, about 2.5 km (1.6 mi) beyond Exit 23 at the Trans Canada Highway.

== Economy ==
Major employers in the area include the Aberdeen Hospital, a Michelin tire plant in nearby Granton and the headquarters of Sobeys, a national grocery chain, in nearby Stellarton. However, New Glasgow and Pictou County have suffered the closure of many large employers, including Convergys (~200 jobs), the Northern Pulp Nova Scotia pulp mill in nearby Abercrombie (~300 jobs).

New Glasgow's historic downtown core is home to several shops and services. Including restaurants, pubs, cabarets, clothing stores, gift shops, furniture department stores, a marina on the riverfront, government offices and banks. A major revitalization plan was recently announced for the downtown core. A large sum of the funds will be provided by the federal government. Among the projects are a walking bridge that will connect the riverfront marina with the Samson Trail on the west side, improvements to the historic town hall, an updated and possibly expanded library, and beautification of public spaces and storefronts. New Glasgow is the commercial hub of northeastern Nova Scotia.

The Westville Road/Highland Square Mall area has seen significant commercial growth in recent years. A new Walmart opened next to Highland Square in early 2007, replacing the smaller location in the mall. Canadian Tire relocated to Walmart's old location in the spring of 2008, making it the second-largest Canadian Tire store in Nova Scotia. Winners opened in Spring 2009, in Canadian Tire's former location. Future Shop has built a new store next to the new Canadian Tire, which opened in Spring 2009 but has since closed. SportChek opened a new store inside the mall in Fall 2009.

About a minute away from the Westville Road commercial district, on the opposite side of the Trans Canada Highway in Stellarton, a new business park is currently being developed. The Holiday Inn Express Hotel Stellarton – New Glasgow was the first confirmed business for the park. It officially opened on July 25, 2008.

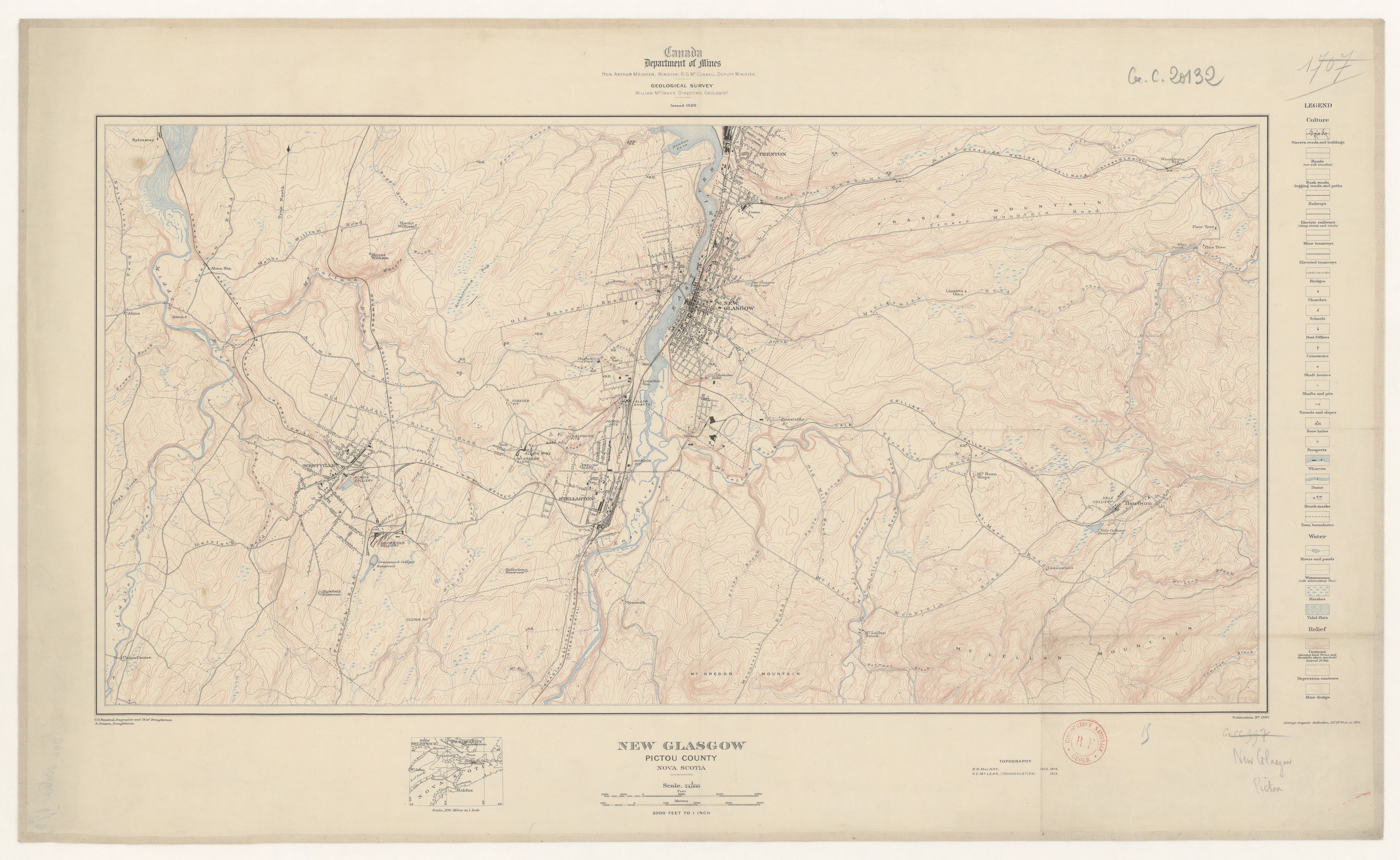
Topographical map 1920 New Glasgow Pictou County

The New Glasgow Farmers Market expanded into an additional, heated facility in November 2015 with the financial assistance of ACOA, The Market is now open every Saturday from 9am until 1pm and boasts more than 70 vendors and more than 1,800 weekly visitors during the peak season from May until October. On July 1, 2017, the New Glasgow Farmers Market will unveil a new community garden project titled The Giving Garden. The project was completed by Market volunteers with the financial grants from the province's Department of Communities, Culture and Heritage through the 150 Forward Fund and a Wellness grant from the Pictou County Health Authority.

== Culture ==
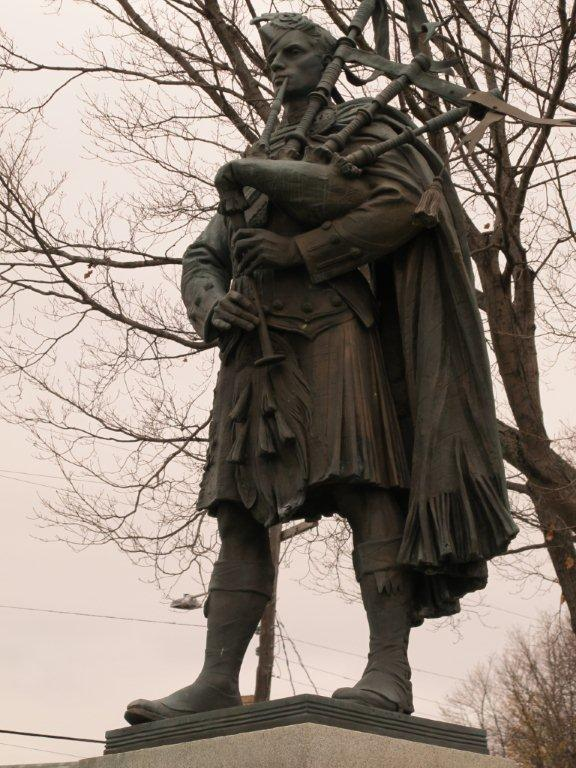
Highland Soldier by renowned sculptor J. Massey Rhind, New Glasgow, Nova Scotia

Museums in New Glasgow include the Pictou County History Museum, local Military Museum, and local Sports Hall of Fame.

Glasgow Square Theatre, located on the downtown riverfront, is a 285-seat auditorium that hosts year-round concerts, plays, and other community functions. The theatre can be transformed into an outdoor amphitheatre, one of the few theatres in Canada (if not the only) that can do that. During the summer it hosts celebrations for Canada Day on June 30, the New Glasgow Riverfront Jubilee during the first weekend in August, and the Race on the River Dragon Boat Festival in mid-August.

The New Glasgow Jubilee features local and national musical acts.

The Race on the River features teams representing local companies and organizations paddling along the East River to raise money for local charities.

New Glasgow's oldest summer event, The Festival of the Tartans, is a celebration of the town's Scottish roots.

== Sports ==
In December 1906, the New Glasgow Cubs challenged the Montreal Wanderers for the Stanley Cup. The Cubs were defeated in the two game total goals contest, losing 10–3 on December 27 and 7–2 on December 29.

New Glasgow's John Brother MacDonald Stadium (formerly New Glasgow Stadium) used to be home to the Pictou County Crushers of the Maritime Junior Hockey League and the Weeks Major Midgets of the Nova Scotia Major Midget Hockey League. The team now plays at the Pictou County Wellness Centre.

The Crushers were based in Halifax and known as Team Pepsi until 2004 when the Weeks Hockey Organization bought the club and moved it to New Glasgow. After struggling to attract fans in Halifax's crowded hockey market, the team is now one of the league's top draws.

New Glasgow hosted the 2005 MJAHL All Star game and the 2006 MJAHL Entry Draft. It was announced on December 29, 2006, that New Glasgow would host the 2008 Fred Page Cup, where the Crushers defeated the defending FPC winners from Pembroke, Ontario in the championship game.

The town hosted the Telus Cup (then Air Canada Cup), in 1997 and the 2001 World Under 17 Hockey Championships (co-hosted with Truro).

In 2007, New Glasgow hosted its first Major Junior hockey game (St. John's Fog Devils vs P.E.I. Rocket).

On February 9, 2008, New Glasgow was one of six communities across Canada selected to be showcased on CBC Sports' day-long Hockey Day in Canada The New Glasgow segments featured hometown NHL player Jon Sim and the town's annual Westside winter carnival.

=== Johnny Miles Running Event ===
The Johnny Miles Marathon is a set of road races held each year on the third Sunday of June. It was founded in 1975 by local physician Dr. Johnny Miles Williston. Williston named the race after Johnny Miles, the legendary Nova Scotia marathoner for whom he was named. Williston served as co-director of the race until 2000. He died in December 2005. The "Johnny Walk," which is part of the event activities, is named for both Johnny Miles and Johnny Miles Williston.

On June 20, 2010, the 35th Annual Johnny Miles Marathon and Running Event was held in New Glasgow with a record participation of over 2000 runners. In 2012 the event was named as Run Nova Scotia's event of the year. The popular event sold out in both 2012 and 2013. The event weekend features multiple races including a 5K, 10K, half-marathon and marathon. There is also a 5K kids race and a walking event called the "Johnny Walk." David MacLennan of Scotsburn, Nova Scotia holds the record for the most wins at the marathon distance, winning his 9th Johnny Miles Marathon in 2012.

== Education ==
There are five schools in New Glasgow; including three primary-to-six elementary schools, a junior high school and a high school. The junior high school is made up of grades seven to nine. North Nova Education Centre, which opened its doors in 2003, is made up of grades nine to twelve, and has students from four ‘feeder’ schools, East Pictou Middle School, Trenton Middle School, New Glasgow Junior High School and Thorburn Consolidated.

== Transportation ==
New Glasgow is served by a public transportation service called Pictou County Transit. The agency operates two bus routes that connect New Glasgow to nearby settlements including Pictou, Pictou Landing First Nation, Stellarton, Trenton, and Westville.

The town is located on Nova Scotia Highway 104, part of the Trans-Canada Highway.

== Notable residents ==
- Dr. Carrie Best, journalist, publisher, activist
- Donald William Cameron, 22nd Premier of Nova Scotia
- George Canyon, country singer who was the runner-up in the USA Network's Nashville Star 2 in 2004
- Kori Cheverie, 2014 Clarkson Cup champion, coach for the Montréal Victoire and Assistant Coach for the Canada Women's National Ice Hockey Team
- J.D. Fortune, former lead singer of Australian rock band INXS. He was chosen as their new singer after winning CBS's Rock Star: INXS in 2005.
- Graham Fraser, 19th-century industrialist, Founder of the Nova Scotia Steel Company and mayor of New Glasgow
- John James Grant, Lieutenant Governor of Nova Scotia
- Scott Jones, writer and filmmaker
- Peter MacKay, federal Conservative politician, formerly served as Minister of Justice and Attorney General
- Lisa MacLeod, Ontario cabinet minister
- Pearleen Oliver, anti racism advocate (1917–2008)
- Perry F. Rockwood (1917-2008), radio evangelist
- Jon Sim, professional ice hockey player with the Bridgeport Sound Tigers of the American Hockey League, won the Stanley Cup in 1999 with the Dallas Stars.
- Mike Smith, actor known primarily for his role as "Bubbles" in Trailer Park Boys.
- Derrick Walser, professional ice hockey player with the Rapperswil-Jona Lakers of the Swiss National League A.
- Colin White, Retired NHL player, won the Stanley Cup in 2000 and 2003 with the New Jersey Devils.
- John Wilson, internationally renowned sculptor.

== Media ==
Radio

- FM 88.7: CBAF-10 (Première Chaîne)
- FM 89.5: CBHN (CBC Radio One)
- FM 94.1: CKEC East Coast FM (adult contemporary)
- FM 97.9: CKEZ (Classic Rock)

Newspapers

- The News

== See also ==
- List of municipalities in Nova Scotia
