= William Sobey =

Canadian businessman (1927–1989)

- Born: William Macdonald Sobey; 9 June 1927; New Glasgow, Nova Scotia, Canada
- Died: 29 May 1989 (aged 61); Salt Lake City, Utah, U.S.
- Occupations: Businessman; politician
- Family: Sobey family

Mayor of Stellarton
- In office 1965–1970

William Macdonald Sobey (9 June 1927 – 29 May 1989) was a Canadian businessman who was chairman of the board of Sobeys and held a variety of roles across 32 Canadian companies. He served as mayor of Stellarton, Nova Scotia from 1965 to 1970.

== Biography ==
William Sobey was born on 9 June 1927 in New Glasgow, Nova Scotia as the oldest son of Frank H. Sobey, who built the Sobeys grocery store chain. He attended Horton Academy in Wolfville with his brother David, and started working in the family business on his summer vacations as a teenager. During the Second World War, when William Sobey was a teenager, the steelworks in Trenton was producing large amounts of firearms and ammunition and paying good wages. He wanted to work at the plant, but his father would not allow it, and he continued working at the first Sobeys store in Stellarton. He was fired briefly by the manager for inadequately sweeping the floor, but his father made him return, and eventually he became president of the company at the age of 34. He later became chairman of Sobeys Stores Ltd. in 1978, and two years later became the chief executive officer. Across his career, he held a position as director or officer in 32 Canadian companies. In addition to his career in business, Sobey was the mayor of Stellarton from 1965 to 1970. His son, Frank C. Sobey, also joined the family business.

In 1971, Sobey was awarded a national human relations award from the Canadian Council of Christians and Jews.

Sobey died on 29 May 1989 in Salt Lake City, Utah, at the age of 61. Hundreds of people attended his funeral at the Sharon St. John United Church, including Premier John Buchanan, the former premier Gerald Regan, and the Minister of Public Works Elmer MacKay.
