= Frank H. Sobey =

Canadian businessman (1902–1985)

Frank H. Sobey OC
- Born: Frank Hoyse Sobey; 24 May 1902; Lyons Brook, Nova Scotia, Canada
- Died: 15 December 1985 (aged 83); Halifax, Nova Scotia, Canada
- Occupations: Businessman, art collector
- Spouse: Irene MacDonald
- Children: 4; including William and David
- Family: Sobey family

Frank Hoyse Sobey OC (24 May 1902 – 15 December 1985) was a Canadian businessman and art collector from Nova Scotia who was the primary builder of the Sobeys chain of supermarkets.

== Life and career ==
Sobey was born on 24 May 1902 in the farming community of Lyons Brook, Nova Scotia, to John William (J.W.) Sobey and Eliza Sobey. He was three years old when his family moved to the nearby coal-mining town of Stellarton. In 1907, his father purchased a meat retailing business and became a butcher, peddling meat products door-to-door from a horse-drawn wagon. In 1912, his father built a 2-storey store in Stellarton's central business district, selling mostly meat and vegetables.

In an era where education opportunities were limited in small Maritime towns, Sobey left school after grade 8 at the age of 16. While still in school, he purchased ten shares in Canada Cement, making a $100 profit in two weeks. He began reading the Financial Post to learn about money, and enrolled for a year of business college in New Glasgow. In 1924, he persuaded his father to expand his store to carry a full range of groceries and the family began expanding, and by the early 1930s they operated stores in the nearby towns of New Glasgow, Trenton, Westville, and the university town of Antigonish. In the early 1940s, the family wished to purchase a building on Archimedes Street in New Glasgow for a supermarket. The property was owned by a company named Empire Company Ltd. and to acquire the building, the family purchased the company itself. Empire was transformed into the family's holding company and was privatized in 1981.

Through Empire Company Ltd., Sobey purchased a local drive-in theatre (renaming it Empire Theatre) and later built a chain of movie theatres, in addition to substantial commercial and residential real estate holdings. In 1971, while still active in the business, Sobey handed over formal control of the company's operations to his three sons: Bill, David, and Donald. In the late 1950s, Premier Robert Stanfield appointed Sobey as unpaid president of Industrial Estates Limited; Sobey is credited with guiding IEL to make investments in the 1960s that significantly expanded and diversified Nova Scotia's economy. Sobey was also one of the investors behind Peter Munk (chairman of Barrick Gold) in founding Clairtone.

Sobey received an honorary Doctor of Laws from Saint Mary's University in Halifax, Nova Scotia, and the university named its Faculty of Commerce in his honour. In 1985, he was made an Officer of the Order of Canada and inducted into the Canadian Business Hall of Fame.

Sobey married Irene MacDonald on 24 November 1924. They had four children: Bill, David, Donald, and Dianne. All three of his sons joined the family business, each playing a key role in the development of the company.

He died in Halifax in 1985 at the age of 83. The majority of his estimated $40 million estate was divided equally amongst his four children, who also inherited most of his investments.

== Works cited ==
- Bruce, Harry (1985). Frank Sobey: The Man and the Empire. Toronto: Macmillan of Canada. ISBN 0-7715-9834-3.
- George, Roy E. (1970). The Life and Times of Industrial Estates Limited. Halifax, N.S.: Institute of Public Affairs, Dalhousie University. OCLC 1035702.
- Hopkins, Garth (1978). Clairtone: The Rise and Fall of a Business Empire. Toronto: McClelland & Stewart. ISBN 978-0-7710-4210-2.
- Pitts, Gordon (2005). The Codfathers: Lessons from the Atlantic Business Elite. Toronto: Key Porter Books. ISBN 1-5526-3718-2.
