= Chignecto-Central Regional Centre for Education =

Public school district in Nova Scotia, Canada

Location
- Truro, Nova Scotia Canada

District information
- Regional Executive Director of Education: Karyn Cooling
- Schools: 65
- Budget: CA$268.7 million (2021-2022)

Students and staff
- Students: 18,460 (2020-21)
- Staff: ≈2700

Other information
- Mission Statement: We create engaging learning experiences in inclusive environments that support each student’s well-being and social emotional development.
- Website: www.ccrce.ca

The Chignecto-Central Regional Centre for Education is a Canadian public school district in Nova Scotia.

== History ==
CCRCE (originally CCRSB) was founded in 1996 under an Order in Council passed by the Executive Council of Nova Scotia pursuant to the "Designation of School Regions and Establishment of School Boards Regulations" made under Section 7 of the Education Act S.N.S. 1995-96, c. 1. This Order in Council created CCRCE (originally CCRSB) and dissolved the following entities:

- Cumberland District School Board
- Colchester-East Hants District School Board
- Pictou District School Board

Each of these were formed in the 1980s from municipal school boards. For example, the Colchester-East Hants District School Board was created from the Truro School Board, the Stewiacke School Board, the Colchester County School Board, and the East Hants District School Board.

=== 2018 Dissolution ===
On January 23, 2018 education consultant Avis Glaze presented a report on the province's school system to government that included the recommendation that the seven elected regional school boards become regional education offices overseen by appointed provincial advisory council. On January 24, 2018, the provincial government announced it accepted the recommendation and the Halifax Regional School Board and six other school boards would be dissolved though no date for dissolution was then announced. The elected school board was dissolved on March 31, 2018.

== Operational organization ==
CCRCE is operationally organized along county lines into regions that are termed "families of schools":

- Celtic Region Family of Schools (Pictou County)
- Nova Region Family of Schools (southern Colchester County and Municipality of the District of East Hants)
- Cobequid Region Family of Schools (central / northern Colchester County)
- Chignecto Region Family of Schools (Cumberland County)

== List of schools ==
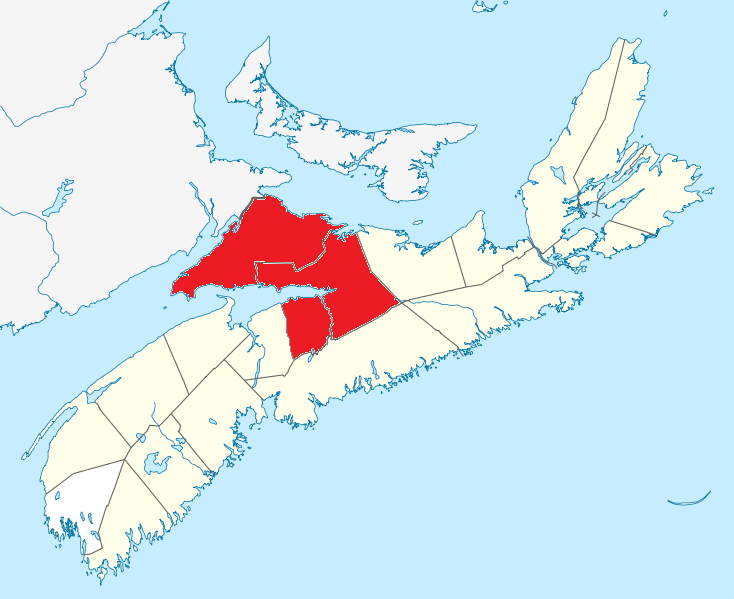
Coverage map of the school board

=== Celtic Region ===
Family of Schools Supervisor (FOSS) - Erin Cormier

- A.G. Baillie Memorial School
- Dr. W.A. MacLeod Consolidated School
- F.H. MacDonald Elementary School
- G.R. Saunders Elementary School
- McCulloch Education Centre
- New Glasgow Academy
- North Nova Education Centre
- Northumberland Regional High School
- Pictou Academy
- Salt Springs Elementary School
- Scotsburn Elementary School
- Thorburn Consolidated School
- Trenton Elementary School
- Trenton Middle School
- Walter Duggan Consolidated School
- West Pictou Consolidated School

=== Chignecto Region ===
Family of Schools Supervisor (FOSS) - Vernon Taylor

- Advocate District School
- Amherst Regional High School
- Cumberland North Academy
- Cyrus Eaton Elementary School
- E.B. Chandler Junior High School
- Junction Road Elementary School
- Northport Consolidated Elementary School
- Oxford Regional Education Centre
- Parrsboro Regional Elementary School
- Parrsboro Regional High School
- Pugwash District High School
- River Hebert District School
- Spring Street Academy
- Springhill Jr./Sr. High School
- Spring Street Academy School
- Wallace Consolidated School
- West End Memorial School
- West Highlands Elementary School

=== Cobequid Region ===
Family of Schools Supervisor (FOSS) - Marilyn Bruce

- Bible Hill Consolidated School
- Bible Hill Junior High School
- Central Colchester Junior High School
- Chiganois Elementary School
- Cobequid Consolidated Elementary School
- Cobequid Educational Centre
- Debert Elementary School
- Great Village Elementary School
- Harmony Heights Elementary School
- North River Elementary School
- Redcliff Middle School
- Tatamagouche Regional Academy
- Truro Middle School
- Truro Elementary School
- Valley Elementary School
- West Colchester Consolidated School

=== Nova Region ===
Family of Schools Supervisor (FOSS) - Tina Knol

- Brookfield Elementary School
- Cobequid District Elementary School
- Elmsdale District Elementary School
- Enfield District Elementary School
- Hants East Rural High School
- Hants North Rural High School
- Hilden Elementary School
- Kennetcook District Elementary School
- Maple Ridge Elementary School
- Rawdon District Elementary School
- Riverside Education Centre
- Shubenacadie District Elementary School
- South Colchester Academy
- Uniacke District School
- Upper Stewiacke Elementary School
- Winding River Consolidated Elementary School
