= The News (New Glasgow) =

Canadian weekly newspaper in Nova Scotia

- Type: Weekly newspaper
- Format: Tabloid
- Owner(s): SaltWire Network
- Publisher: Richard Russell
- Founded: 1911
- Language: English
- Headquarters: 352 East River Road; New Glasgow, Nova Scotia; B2H 5E2
- Circulation: 6,988 weekdays 6,836 Saturdays in 2009
- Website: www.ngnews.ca

The News (formerly The Evening News) is a weekly newspaper, published Thursdays, serving New Glasgow and Pictou County, Nova Scotia.

== See also ==
- List of newspapers in Canada
