= Aberdeen Regional Hospital =

- Pictou County Health Authority
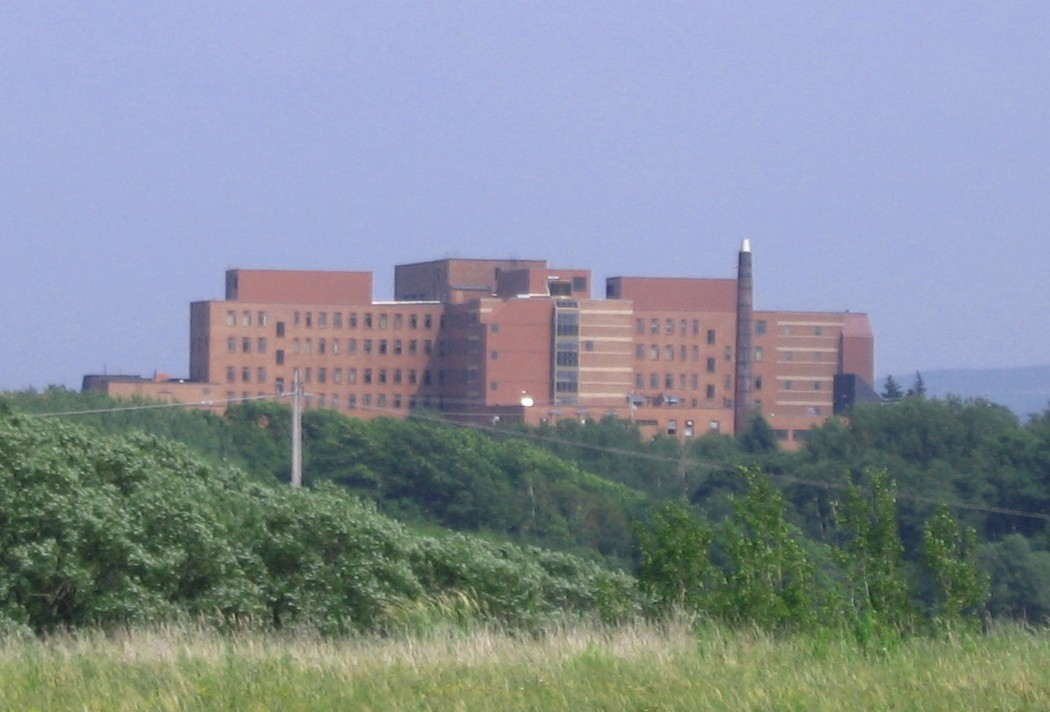

- Aberdeen Regional Hospital in Nova Scotia

Geography
- Location: New Glasgow, Nova Scotia, Canada
- Coordinates: 45.5730°N 62.6432°W

Organization
- Care system: Medicare

Services
- Emergency department: II
- Beds: 104

Helipads
- Helipad: TC LID: CNG2

History
- Founded: 1895

Links
- Website: www.aberdeenhospital.com

The Aberdeen Hospital is a 24-hour emergency (Level II trauma service), inpatient, outpatient, and community-based services hospital in New Glasgow, Nova Scotia. The hospital has been in existence since 1895. It serves approximately 48,000 people in Pictou County. It is located at 835 East River Road (Route 348) in New Glasgow. It is operated by Nova Scotia Health Authority. The hospital currently has 104 beds.

Internationally renowned sculptor John Wilson donated to the hospital the land on which the Glen Haven Manor was built.
