= Perry F. Rockwood =

Canadian Fundamentalist minister and broadcaster

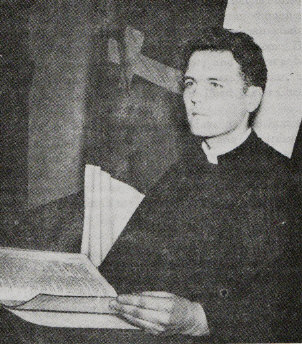
- Rockwood announcing his resignation from the Presbyterian Church in 1947
- Born: March 23, 1917; New Glasgow, Nova Scotia, Canada
- Died: March 7, 2008 (aged 90); Halifax, Nova Scotia, Canada
- Education: Acadia University; The Presbyterian College, Montreal; Knox College, Toronto
- Known for: People's Gospel Hour radio broadcast
- Spouse: Ena Mae Coulstan (m. 1942)

Ecclesiastical career
- Ordained: 1943
- Writings: The Gospel Standard (monthly); The Coming Antichrist; Is Jesus Christ really coming again?; The Power of the Blood; After death what?; Is the KJV God's Word for Today?; Coming events : a survey of last-day events; How to be saved and know it
- Congregations: St. James Presbyterian Church, Truro, Nova Scotia (1943–1947); People's Church, Truro; Missionary Bible Church, Halifax (1978–2008)

Perry Francis Rockwood (March 23, 1917 – March 7, 2008) was a Canadian fundamentalist Christian minister and radio broadcaster, who founded the weekly People's Gospel Hour program in 1947 on a station in Truro, Nova Scotia. His broadcast eventually reached a worldwide audience. Rockwood also started publication of a monthly magazine, The Gospel Standard, and wrote numerous books, distributed from his organization's headquarters in Halifax, Nova Scotia.

Rockwood was ordained by the Presbyterian Church in Canada in 1943, but subsequently criticized the denomination over doctrinal issues in a series of sermons preached in November 1946 at the Truro church where he was pastor. As a result, he was charged by Presbyterian officials in January 1947 with "divisive action". Rockwood's ensuing church trial resulted in front-page news stories in Canada, marked by bitter invective and his subsequent resignation when he refused demands to recant. He then formed an independent church and began his radio ministry, which continues to the present day: the People's Gospel Hour broadcast now consists of newly recorded music and spoken segments by staff, accompanied by reruns of archived sermons preached by Rockwood during his lifetime.

== Early years and education ==
Rockwood was born in New Glasgow, Nova Scotia, on March 23, 1917, the son of Mark and Violet (née Baker) Rockwood. He recounted in his autobiography, Triumph in God: The Life Story of Radio Pastor Perry F. Rockwood, that he was one of six children in a family beset by illness and financial difficulties. As an 18-year-old high school senior in 1936, he became a born again Christian while attending a Presbyterian Church in New Glasgow. A year later, Rockwood decided he wanted to be a minister and enrolled at Acadia University in Nova Scotia. He worked his way through the Baptist-controlled university by doing odd jobs, such as waiting tables and having a summer factory job.

Upon graduation from Acadia University in 1940, Rockwood enrolled at The Presbyterian College, Montreal, the denomination's seminary for aspiring ministers. When he arrived by train at Montreal's Windsor Station, the poor young man had no money for transportation to the seminary or even to claim his trunk at the railroad station. Facing a two-hour walk to the college bereft of his possessions and feeling sorry for himself, he began to cry, Rockwood admitted in his autobiography. A week later, he received $7 for preaching at a Sunday church service, which enabled him to finally get his trunk out of storage and have it delivered, Rockwood wrote years later. After his first year at The Presbyterian College, Montreal, Rockwood said he was disappointed in the school's "modernism and worldliness" and transferred to Knox College, Toronto, where he completed his seminary training in 1943.

== Ministry ==
When Rockwood was ordained by the Presbyterian Church in Canada in 1943, he wrote that he embraced wholeheartedly the denomination's doctrinal beliefs as set forth in its canonical Westminster Confession of Faith. He pastored his first church in the rural village of Thorburn, Nova Scotia, that year.

=== Pastor at St. James Presbyterian Church, Truro ===
Rockwood preached as a substitute at St. James Presbyterian Church in Truro, Nova Scotia, in September 1944. Shortly thereafter, he accepted the call of the church elders to become their permanent minister. In November–December 1946, the then 29-year-old pastor preached a four-part series of sermons, denouncing what he called the "apostasy" of the Presbyterian Church and its seminary theologians for condoning liberal Protestantism's denial of the virgin birth of Jesus and Christ's resurrection. The four sermons' titles were:

- November 10: "The Church sick unto death doctrinally"
- November 17: "The Church sick unto death educationally"
- November 24: "The Church sick unto death ecumenically at home"
- December 1: "The Church sick unto death ecumenically abroad"

In response, Rockwood was brought up on charges of "following a divisive course" by the Halifax-Lunenburg, Nova Scotia, Presbytery before a Presbyterian ecclesiastical court. At the church's annual meeting on January 16, 1947, the congregation of St. James Presbyterian unanimously adopted a resolution supporting their pastor in the controversy. When he subsequently resigned in March 1947, Rockwood published Farewell, the last sermons he preached as minister of the 300-member St. James Presbyterian Church. A replacement minister for the church was appointed in September of that year by the Halifax-Lunenburg Presbytery.

=== Ecclesiastical trial and controversy ===
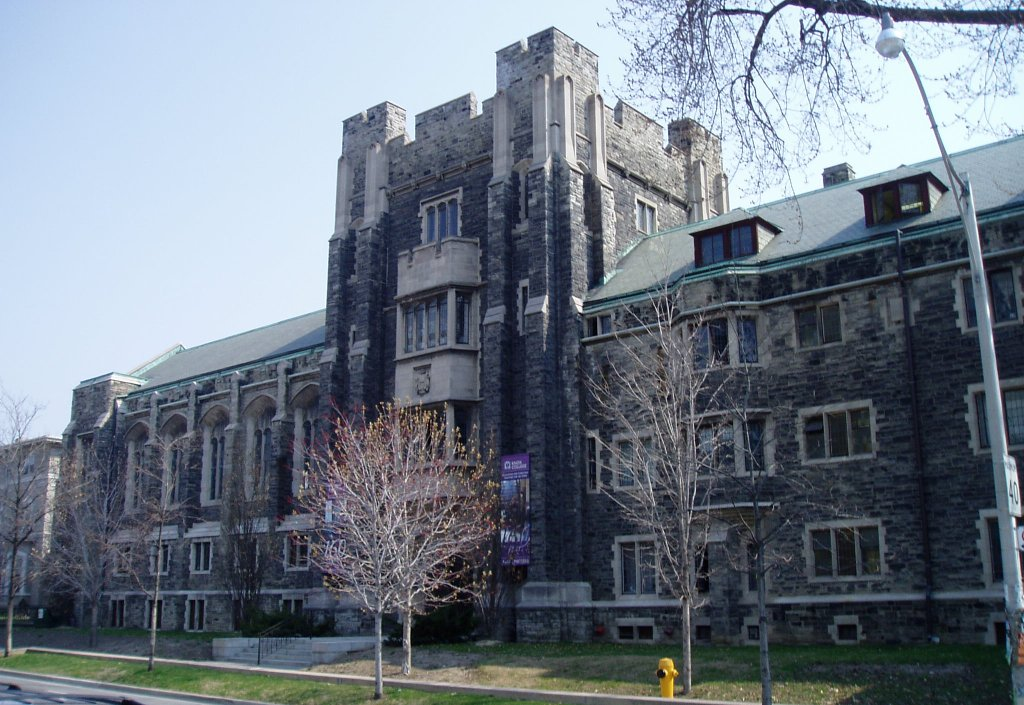
Knox College, Toronto, where Rockwood completed seminary training

Rockwood was charged by the Halifax-Lunenburg, Nova Scotia, Presbytery with conduct "unbecoming a minister of the Christian church", misinterpretation of the Bible, and an "attempt to split the Presbyterian church", referring to his call to "stand firm and indeed separate ourselves from all unbelief as the church drifts from her faith-moorings". In his defense, Rockwood said, "When the church departs from the Bible it is up to us to point out the error, irrespective of consequences, to maintain the truth and the purity of the church". When the hearing convened on March 4, 1947, fifty-six supporters of Rockwood arrived by bus, with the embattled pastor saying, "It's just like Luther's day — we've come to storm the palace". The unusual public church trial created a national sensation, with the Toronto Star carrying the story of the trial on its front-page and a Canadian Press dispatch reporting, "the tense drama is creating Dominion wide interest". The following Sunday, March 9, outspoken Canadian fundamentalist minister Thomas Todhunter Shields preached a sermon defending Rockwood at Toronto's Jarvis Street Baptist Church, entitled, "Rev. Perry F. Rockwood — a Hero of the Faith, or a 'Fundamentalist'-Fanatic?" and the Gospel Witness journal of March 27 published the texts of Rockwood's controversial sermons in their entirety.

The ecclesiastical court hearing the charges in March 1947, found Rockwood guilty of divisiveness and ordered him to recant and burn his sermons. Rockwood refused, choosing instead to resign from the denomination, announced March 20, 1947. It was "not an easy decision to make", he wrote later, knowing that resignation meant losing his position as pastor of a large church with a good salary and pension, along with free housing. In the aftermath of the trial and verdict, Rockwood's sermons and his defense by Shields were printed and widely advertised in newspapers across Canada with the banner headline, "Rockwood's Sermons Which Presbytery Ordered Burned". All of the officers and teachers at the 300-member St. James Presbyterian Church resigned in protest, along with six of the nine board members. Other like-minded ministers preached sermons on the controversy, such as "Ought Perry Rockwood to have spoken?", advertised at a church in Edmonton. Presbyteries around Canada expressed differing views on the outcome: the Brookville, Ontario, Presbytery unanimously passed a resolution calling Rockwood's censure "contrary to the traditions of Presbyterianism". In Montreal, on the other hand, the Presbytery repudiated what it called "agitation in the Church". Stung by the criticism and adverse publicity, the Halifax-Lunenburg Presbytery responded with a statement, saying that Rockwood was censured for attacking the denomination's seminary teachers at The Presbyterian College, Montreal, and not for preaching the Bible or freely speaking his mind. The statement added that Rockwood, "suffers from delusions of greatness and an itch for fame" and "has taken as his master [Nazi propagandist] Dr. Joseph Goebbels and works on the principle that if a lie is big enough and told often enough some people will believe it".

In the weeks following his resignation, Rockwood preached to large crowds in Canada and the U.S., addressing an audience of 4,000 in Toronto alone. In the New York City area, he preached at the behest of evangelist Jack Wyrtzen.

=== People's Gospel Hour ===
Following his separation from the Presbyterian denomination, Rockwood formed an independent church in Truro, first meeting in a high school auditorium. With the support of Shields, a small building was then acquired for "The People's Church", as it was called. The following year, the church began to send out missionaries and, after four years, had raised $26,000 for missions.

Rockwood began broadcasting on a local radio station, CKCL-AM, on September 7, 1947. By 1964, his radio program was carried on 54 stations in Canada and the U.S. and he called himself "Canada's only full-time radio evangelist". His weekly half-hour People's Gospel Hour broadcast of Christian music and fundamentalist sermons eventually reached a worldwide audience.

As the radio ministry expanded, Rockwood moved his organization's headquarters to Halifax, Nova Scotia, where he founded the Missionary Bible Church of Halifax in 1978 and continued as its pastor until his death in 2008. He started publication of a monthly magazine, The Gospel Standard, and wrote numerous books, printed and distributed from Halifax. In 1953, a U.S. office was opened in Boston. On December 2, 1968, Rockwood's ministry added a 15-minute daily program, Prophecy for Today, in which he commented on news events in the light of Biblical prophecy. By 1992, the ministry announced it was producing a total of 600 programs weekly, airing in Canada, the U.S., the U.K. and Europe, Russia, the Middle East, the Caribbean, Africa, South America, and Bermuda.

Rockwood's sermons stress that personal salvation is only possible through born again faith in Jesus Christ, and not merely nominal church membership or partaking of ritualistic sacraments. He strongly opposed ecumenism and criticized Catholicism, as well as disparaging Bible interpretations other than the King James Version and denouncing "modernism" in the church.

== Books ==
A prolific writer, Rockwood's books include his autobiography, Triumph in God: the life story of radio pastor Perry F. Rockwood. Among his other books published by the Peoples Gospel Hour are:

- The Coming Antichrist
- Protestants Awake!
- The Power of the Blood
- The King is coming!
- After death what?
- Is the KJV God's Word for Today?
- Did God write a book?
- Coming events: a survey of last-day events
- 섭리로 보존된 성경 : 올바른 영어성경 선택의 길잡이 (Korean: "A Guide to Choosing the Right English Bible", OCLC 1128542965)
- The Holy Spirit: In the World Today
- What is wrong with the Protestant church?
- Is Jesus Christ really coming again?
- The King is coming!

== Personal life and legacy ==
Rockwood met his future wife, Ena Mae Coulstan, while he was studying at Acadia University and they married on September 8, 1942. He died on March 7, 2008, and is buried in Halifax. His 30-minute People's Gospel Hour broadcast continues on Sundays as of 2026, with newly recorded music and spoken segments by Graham Thompson preceding reruns of archived sermons preached by Rockwood during his lifetime. As of 2015, the program is broadcast on radio stations in nine of Canada's ten provinces (the exception being Newfoundland), along with the U.S., the Caribbean, Taiwan, the Philippines, Russia, and Ireland, as well as heard by shortwave radio in Africa, India, and the Middle East and streamed on the internet over various outlets. The organization also produces a 15-minute daily program, Prophecy For Today, heard Mondays through Fridays. The Gospel Standard pamphlet continues to be published monthly by the organization he founded at its Halifax headquarters.
