= Sebastopol (ship) =

General characteristics
- Type: Clipper ship
- Tonnage: 992 tons

Sebastopol was a New Zealand immigrant clipper ship of 992 tons, built in New Glasgow, Nova Scotia, Canada. She made two voyages to New Zealand in 1861 and 1863 sailing from Gravesend, England to Lyttelton, Christchurch with immigrants for the Canterbury Provincial Government.

The first journey departed on 5 September 1861 from Gravesend and arrived in Lyttelton on 14 December 1861 with about 223 passengers on board. The second journey departed 17 January 1863 from Gravesend and arrived in Lyttelton on 21 May 1863 with about 249 passengers. At the end of the second journey, the ship's surgeon died by suicide whilst the ship was in Lyttelton Harbour.

Other journeys included cargo bound for Australia, and Chinese passengers for British Guyana.

The ship came to an end after leaving the Port of Lyttelton in 1863 on the return trip to the United Kingdom.

== Sources ==
- Lansley, Belinda (2012). The Clipper Ship Sebastopol – New Zealand Immigration Ship 1861–1863. Dornie Publishing. ISBN 9780473218904.
- "Shipping Intelligence". Lyttelton Times. Vol. XVI, no. 950. 18 December 1861. p. 4.
- "Shipping Intelligence". Lyttelton Times. 23 May 1863. p. 4.
- Brett, Henry (1928). "White Wings Vol II. Founding Of The Provinces And Old-Time Shipping. Passenger Ships From 1840 To 1885". New Zealand Electronic Text Collection. Auckland: The Brett Printing Company Limited.
