= Drummond Mine explosion =

Coordinates: 45.55680°N 62.70415°W

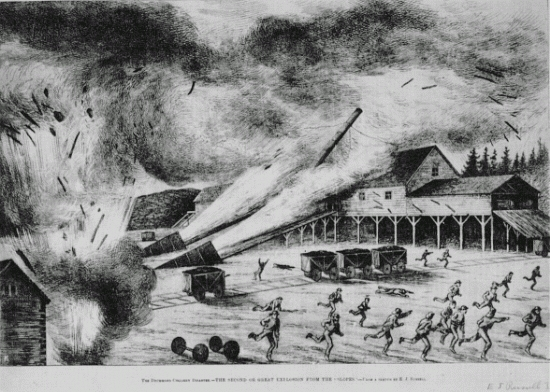
The Second or Great Explosion From the "Slopes", Canadian Illustrated News, May 31, 1873

The Drummond Mine explosion, also called the Drummond Colliery Disaster, was a mining accident that happened in Westville, Pictou County, Nova Scotia on May 13, 1873.

In the 1870s, the Drummond mine was considered Canada's leading colliery. However, small fires were constantly erupting in the coal seams. On May 13, 1873 Fireman Robert McLeod started a small fire with gunpowder on a ledge of coal and attempted to extinguish it in the usual way, with a bucket of water. Unable to do so after 20 minutes and several buckets, he left and alerted the manager, James Dunn. When he returned, the blaze had grown beyond control. He ran for safety, just as the first explosion occurred, around 12:15.

The first explosion killed and wounded many in the mine, including manager James Dunn. As miners on the surface were discussing the rescue of the injured, the second explosion occurred. This was far more powerful, acting with the force of a volcano. Towers of flame spewed miners, timber, and rocks from all the mine entrances. A closed older mine, the Campbell Workings, connected to the Drummond mine was also reopened by the blast. The second explosion was followed by others. The fire was finally contained and extinguished five days later by diverting streams into all openings and then filling them with gravel, clay and debris. Seventy men either died in the explosion or were sealed in the mine.

== Cause ==
The causes are uncertain. A firedamp explosion, likely of hydrogen sulfide, that triggered off a coal dust explosion is most likely. The mine had been just re-opened following a strike, leading to a buildup of "foul air." A coroner’s inquest ruled that the fire had followed from the use of gunpowder in the mine.
