= Sobey School of Business =

Business school in Halifax, Nova Scotia

Coordinates: 44.630289°N 63.581523°W

- Type: Public Business School
- Established: 1934
- Affiliations: AACSB, CPA, CGA, CFA, CIM, EFMD, BGS
- Dean: Michel Delorme
- Location: Halifax, Nova Scotia, Canada
- Campus: Urban
- Website: www.sobey.smu.ca

The Sobey School of Business is the business school of Saint Mary's University (SMU), located in Halifax, Nova Scotia, Canada. Originally established in 1934 as the Saint Mary's University Faculty of Commerce, the program was one of the first business programs in Canada. It is the most comprehensive business school in Atlantic Canada.. In 1992, the Faculty of Commerce was renamed the Sobey School of Business after Frank H. Sobey, the founder of Empire Company Limited and Sobeys. The Sobey School of Business offers a well-respected Bachelor of Commerce program, with a wide range of specialties, including entrepreneurship, sports business, finance, accounting, computing and information systems and human resource management and industrial relations. The School also provides a range of graduate-level programs including a Master of Business Administration, a Master of Business Analytics, a Master of Finance, a Master of Applied Economics, a Master of Technology Entrepreneurship and Innovation, and a well-respected Ph.D. program.

The Sobey Building on the Saint Mary's University campus was built in 2000 and has been regularly updated since then. It houses offices, meeting rooms, the BComm Advising Centre, the Scotiabank Conference Theatre, and classrooms. The modern building, along with the joined Loyola building, host many of the School's classes, along with computer labs, faculty and administration offices, seminar rooms, research spaces, Doctoral student offices and separate student lounges for graduate and B.Comm students. The adjoining 43,000 square foot Sobeys Inspiration Hub was opened in 2022. It houses the Arthur L. Irving Entrepreneurship Centre, the David Sobey Retailing Centre, the Humanities Media Lab and more.

== Accreditations & Recognition ==
=== Association to Advance Collegiate Schools of Business (AACSB) ===
The Sobey School of Business is accredited by The Association to Advance Collegiate Schools of Business (AACSB) International. Less than 5% of business schools worldwide (about 20 in Canada) have earned this accreditation, the highest standard in management education.

=== EQUIS ===
In 2025, Sobey school was re-accredited by EQUIS after attaining accreditation in 2022. This accreditation is held by less than 2% of business schools worldwide and is valid for a three-year period. EQUIS is the leading international system of quality assessment, improvement, and accreditation of higher education institutions in management and business administration.

=== Ranking ===
- Corporate Knights' ranked the Sobey MBA in the top 40 in the world in their Better World MBA ranking (2025).

== Notable alumni ==
- Robert P. Kelly – CEO of The Bank of New York Mellon (Former)
- Wilfred P. Moore – Canadian Senator, Nova Scotia

== See also ==
- Sobey family
