= Linacy, Nova Scotia =

Community in Nova Scotia, Canada

Linacy
- Unincorporated community
- Location of Linacy in Nova Scotia
- Coordinates: 45°35′15″N 62°36′30″W
- Country: Canada
- Province: Nova Scotia
- County: Pictou County
- Time zone: UTC-4 (Atlantic Standard Time)
  - Summer (DST): UTC-3 (Atlantic Daylight Time)
- Postal code: B2H

Linacy is an unincorporated community in Pictou County in the Canadian province of Nova Scotia near the much larger town of New Glasgow.

== History ==
Linacy was named for Edward Linacy, one of the area's first settlers.
