= David Sobey =

Canadian businessman (1931–2023)

David Sobey CM
- Born: David Frank Sobey; 22 March 1931
- Died: 18 September 2023 (aged 92)
- Occupations: Businessman; philanthropist
- Family: Sobey family

David Frank Sobey CM (22 March 1931 – 18 September 2023) was a Canadian businessman and philanthropist known for his role in the Sobeys grocery store chain, founded by his grandfather in 1907. He was the chairman and CEO of Sobeys from 1986 to 1995, and chairman from 1995 until his retirement in 2001. He remained on the board of Empire Company until 2015. His philanthropic contributions included a CA$9 million donation to Saint Mary's University in Halifax in 2019. Sobey received a variety of honours across his career, including appointment to the Order of Canada in 1995 and induction into the Canadian Business Hall of Fame in 2007.

== Early life and education ==
David Sobey was born on 22 March 1931 to parents Frank H. Sobey and Irene Sobey. His grandfather, John William Sobey, was the founder of the Sobeys grocery store chain in 1907, which grew into a national company under the leadership of Frank Sobey. David had two brothers, Donald Sobey and William Sobey. At the age of 12, David kept laying hens and sold eggs, encouraged by his father. David attended Horton Academy in Wolfville with his brother William, and started working in the family business at an early age. He attended Dalhousie University, where he met his wife in 1950.

== Career ==
His professional career with Sobeys began in 1951, first working in Pictou County stores before assuming management of a Westville location. He travelled to Boston on the direction of his father in 1953 to work at First National Stores and gain experience in the grocery industry. A year later, Sobey returned to Nova Scotia and assumed management of the Sobeys store on Gottingen Street in Halifax. He continued to advance to higher leadership roles, eventually becoming the director of merchandising and advertising as well as vice-president.

Sobey assumed management of the company in 1971 alongside his two brothers. He was chairman and CEO of Sobeys from 1986 to 1995, and chairman from 1995 until he retired from the business in 2001. Following his retirement, he stayed on the board of Empire Company until 2015. His son, Paul Sobey, also joined the family business as a director.

In 2017, David and Faye Sobey donated a 30-acre property located on the St. Mary's River in Guysborough County to the Nova Scotia Nature Trust. In 2019, Sobey made a donation of CA$9 million to Saint Mary's University in Halifax, as part of an $18 million gift from the Sobey family, the largest in the university's history.

Sobey died on 18 September 2023, at the age of 92. He was remembered by Premier Tim Houston as "a very insightful person and a very calming voice".

== Recognition ==
Sobey was the recipient of a variety of awards and distinctions. In 1991, he was named a Knight of the Golden Pencil by the Food Industry Association of Canada. The following year, he received the Distinguished Canadian Retailer of the Year Award from the Retail Council of Canada. On 8 May 1995, Sobey was invested as a Member of the Order of Canada.

Sobey and his brothers were appointed to the Nova Scotia Business Hall of Fame in 2002. Him and his brother Donald were also appointed to the Canadian Business Hall of Fame in 2007, and awarded the Lifetime Achievement Award from the Retail Council of Canada in 2019. He received honorary degrees from Saint Mary's University, St. Francis Xavier University, Cape Breton University, Dalhousie University and Mount Allison University.
