= Pugwash District High School =

Coordinates: 45.854698°N 63.659081°W

Location
- 192 Church Street; Pugwash, Nova Scotia; Canada

Information
- Type: High School
- Motto: Veritas Nos Liberabit (the truth shall set you free)
- Established: 1958
- Principal: Shawn Brunt
- Grades: 7–12
- Enrollment: 198
- Colors: Red and Black
- Mascot: Panther
- Website: pdhs.ccrsb.ca

Pugwash District High School (PDHS) is a secondary school located in Pugwash, Nova Scotia. PDHS is part of the Chignecto-Central Regional School Board and is the only high school in the town of Pugwash. This secondary school receives the majority of students from a combination of Wallace Consolidated Elementary School, Cyrus Eaton Elementary School, and other smaller primary schools in the area.
