= Sobey family =

Canadian family

- Country: Canada
- Current region: Nova Scotia
- Estate: Crombie House

The Sobey family is a prominent family of businessmen and art collectors in the Canadian province of Nova Scotia. They are best known for founding Sobeys, the second largest food retailer in Canada, which began as a small meat delivery business in 1907 and grew into a national chain of grocery stores under the leadership of Frank H. Sobey and his sons Bill, David, and Donald. The Sobey family's wealth is primarily concentrated in Empire Company, the parent company of Sobeys, which also holds considerable investments in real estate. The family has made substantial charitable donations through their foundations, primarily in the area of arts and culture. They have built a significant art collection, managed by the Sobey Art Foundation, which established the Sobey Art Award.

== Origins ==
The Sobey family traces its roots to the Polish Sobieski family. Their ancestors emigrated to England from Poland, where they anglicized their name as "Sobey". Sobeys were living in southwest England as early as the 1720s; the Nova Scotia branch began with William Sobey, born in Crediton, Devon. Sobey enlisted in the Royal Engineers in 1855, serving in Halifax, Nova Scotia for seven years. His son, John William Sobey, was born in 1869 in Camp Aldershot in Hampshire; the family emigrated to Nova Scotia soon after, arriving in the early 1870s.

== Business interests ==
=== Sobeys ===
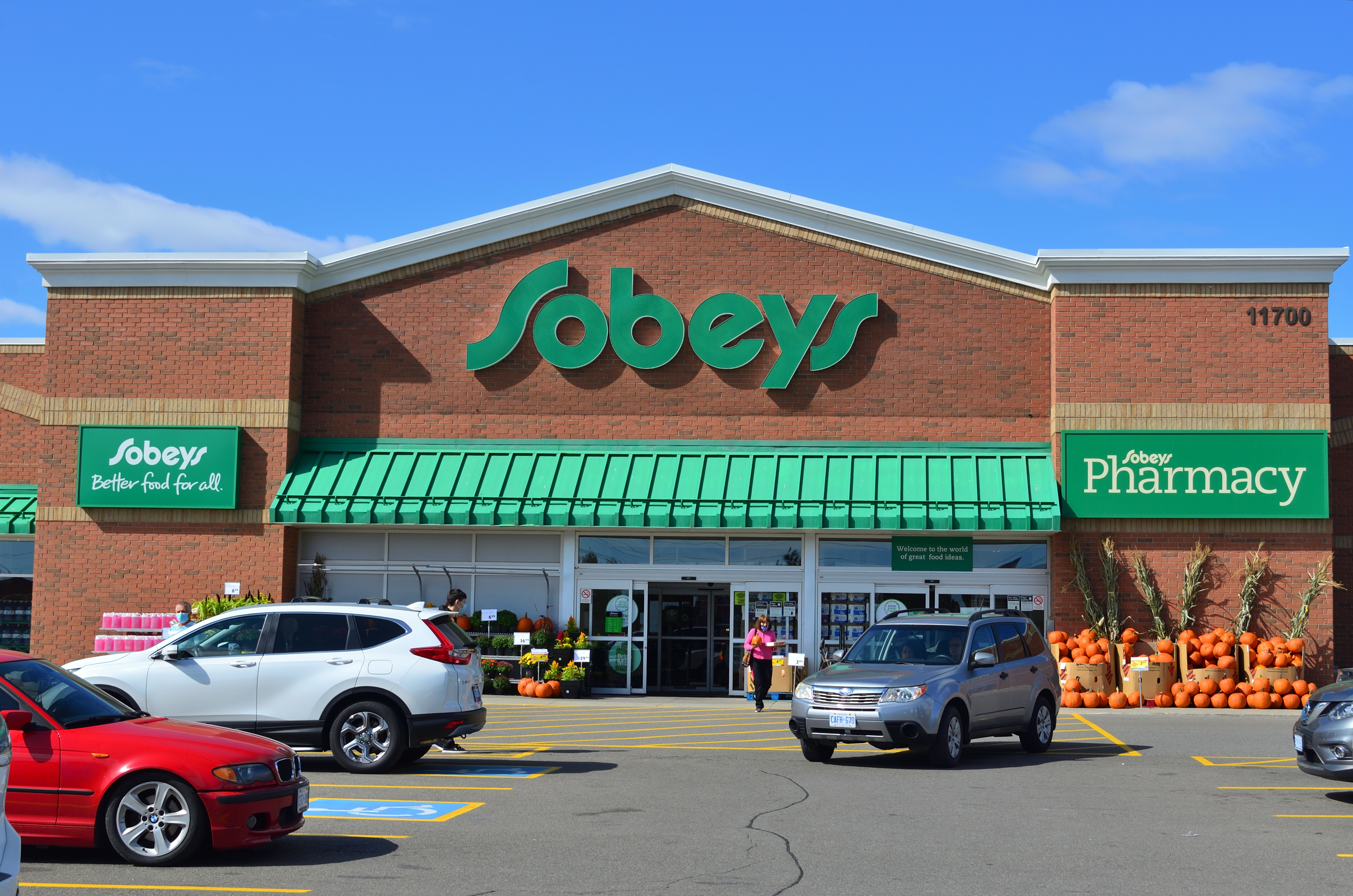
Sobeys, the grocery store chain built by Frank H. Sobey and his three sons, is the second largest food retailer in Canada

The Sobey family business began in 1907 in Stellarton, when John William Sobey began delivering meat on a horse and buggy. In 1912, he established the first Sobeys store, and his son Frank H. Sobey joined the business in 1924. Frank incorporated Sobeys Stores Limited in 1946, subsequently growing the company through acquisitions and new locations across Atlantic Canada. Sobeys was firmly established as a regional grocery chain by the 1950s, and later expanded nationally. In 1971, Frank Sobey's sons Bill, David, and Donald assumed management of the business. Sobeys continued to grow throughout the 1970s and 1980s, and in 1998 the company established itself as the second largest food distributor in Canada with the purchase of the Oshawa Group. As of 2022, Sobeys has over 120,000 employees with an annual revenue of over CA$25 billion. The Retail Council of Canada awarded the Sobey family the 2019 Canadian Grocery Industry Grand Prix Lifetime Achievement Award in recognition of their commitment to the Canadian retail and grocery industry.

=== Empire Company ===
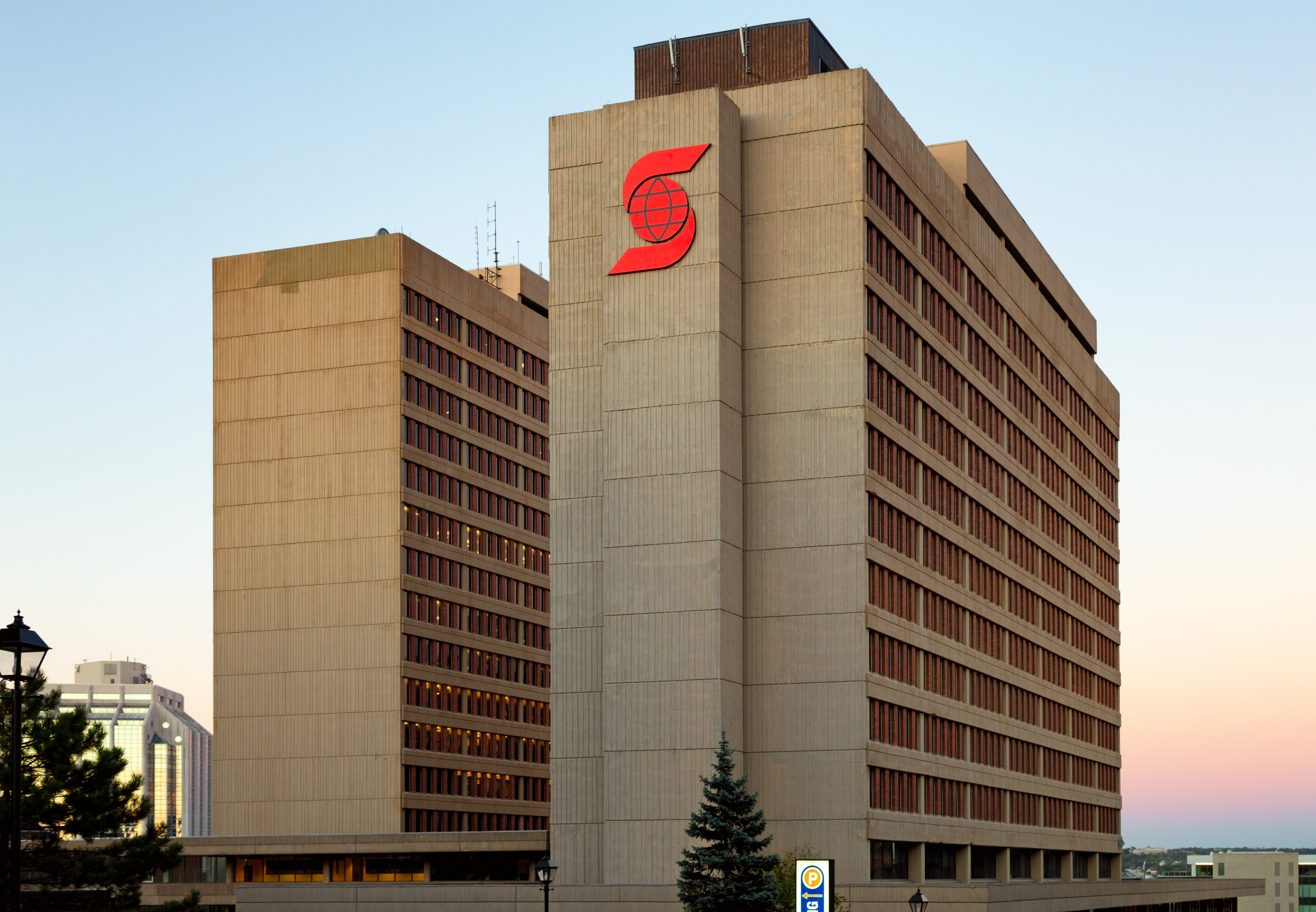
Empire Company holds substantial investments in Crombie REIT, which owns and manages Scotia Square

Empire Company is the holding company which manages the Sobey family's business interests, and accounts for the majority of their wealth. Empire is the parent company of Sobeys, and owns over 1,600 grocery stores under a variety of banners across Canada. The company also holds substantial investments in Crombie REIT, a real estate investment trust, and Genstar Development Company, a real estate development company.

The family restructured their business holdings in 2007, spinning off Crombie REIT while retaining 49.5% ownership, and privatizing Sobeys Inc. by purchasing its remaining 29% of shares for a total of $1 billion.

In 2017, the three branches of the Sobey family consolidated their controlling interests in Empire Company. The new holding company, Class B Holdings Ltd., acquired roughly 92 percent of Empire's Class B common shares from the holding companies owned by David Sobey, William Sobey, and Donald Sobey. Members of the family still hold shares in the company individually.

=== Wealth ===
The Sobey family were included on the Canadian Business list of Canada's 100 wealthiest people in 2014, ranking 20th with a net worth of CA$2.95 billion. A 2018 report from the Canadian Centre for Policy Alternatives placed the Sobey family amongst the wealthiest 87 families living in Canada, with a net worth of $2.3 billion as of 2016. According to Maclean's, the Sobey family had a wealth of $4.49 billion as of 2024, growing to $5.5 billion in 2025.

== Philanthropy ==
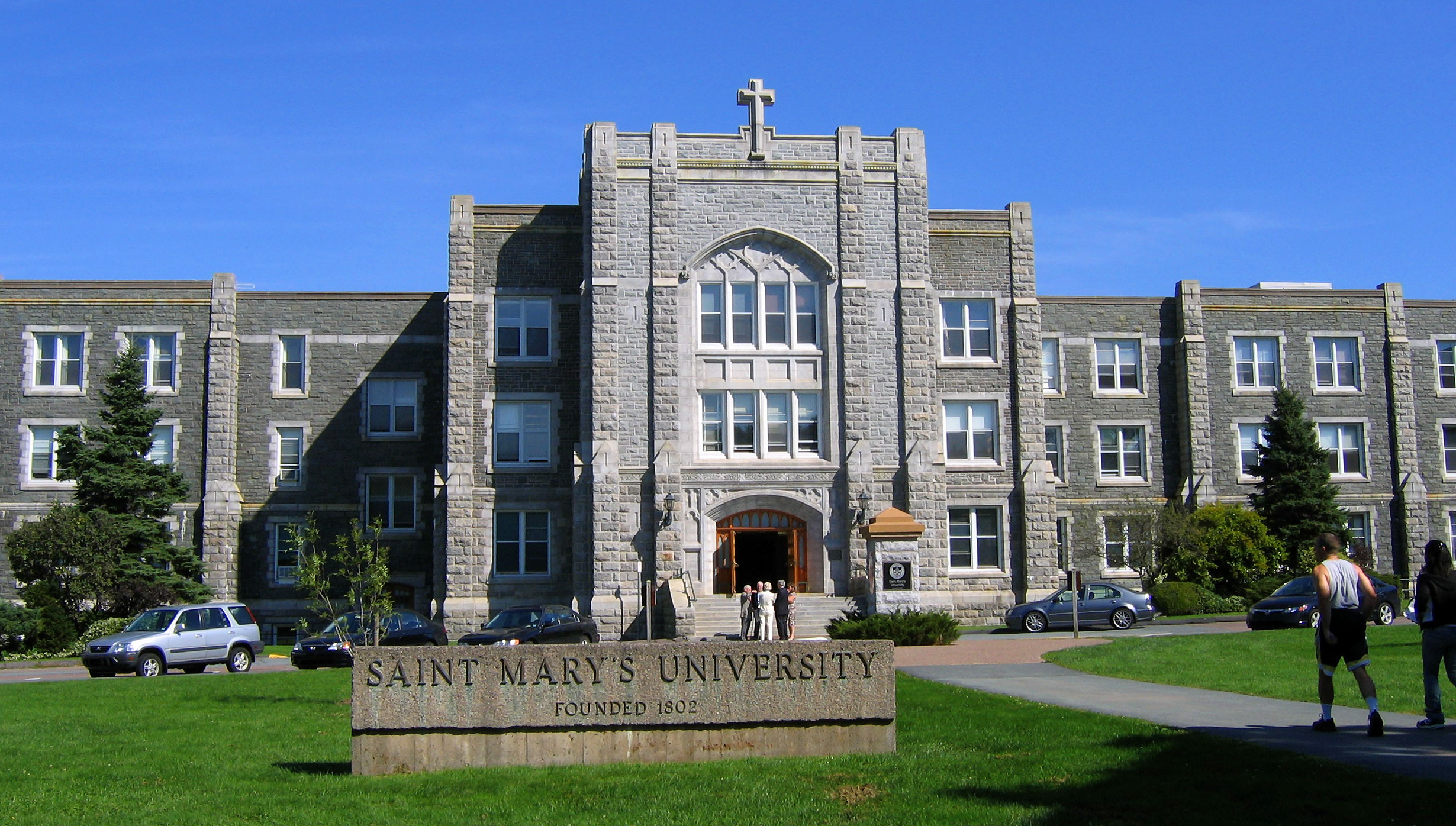
Saint Mary's University in Halifax has received a substantial amount of donations from the Sobey family

The Sobey family has donated considerably to Saint Mary's University in Halifax, starting in 1975 with a donation from Frank Sobey. The university received a large donation from his estate after he died in 1985, and in the early 1990s their faculty of commerce was renamed the Sobey School of Business. In 2019, the Sobey family donated CA$18 million to Saint Mary's University, the largest donation the school had ever received.

Much of the family's philanthropic endeavours are undertaken through the Sobey Foundation, established by Frank Sobey and his three sons in 1982. The family has donated a total of $4.2 million to the National Gallery of Canada, including a $2 million donation in 2015 to support Canada's participation in Venice Biennale. Following this donation, the National Gallery named an exhibition space after them, marking the first time the gallery named a space after a donor. The same year, the family donated $3 million to the IWK Health Centre.

In 2017, the Sobey family donated a total of $6.5 million to the Nova Scotia Community College (NSCC), with funds provided from the Sobey Foundation, the Donald R. Sobey Foundation, and individual members of the family. The donation included $2 million for the refurbishment of NSCC's Sobeys Culinary Centres.

The family announced the donation of $10 million towards the construction of the new Art Gallery of Nova Scotia in 2020, but had given only $1.75 million of the funds before the project was put on hold by the provincial government in 2022. The money donated by the Sobeys was instead used to offer free admission to the art gallery and acquire a work by the artist Joan Jonas.

In 2021, the Sobey family donated $1 million to the Nova Scotia Nature Trust. A year later, they donated $1.25 million to the Confederation Centre of the Arts, the largest donation in the centre's history. The mainstage at the centre was subsequently renamed the Sobey Family Theatre in July 2022.

== Art collection ==
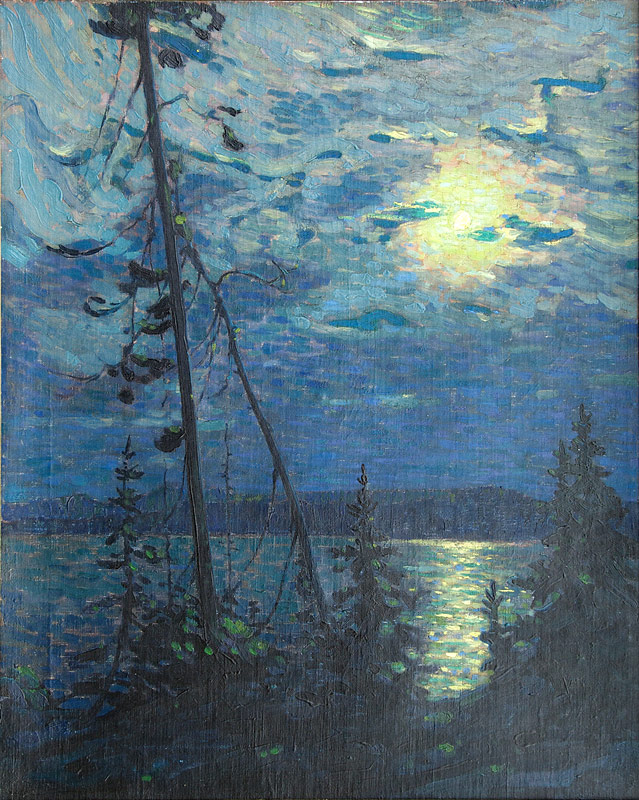
Tom Thomson's Moonlight, part of the Sobey Art Collection

The Sobey Art Collection began in the 1950s when Frank Sobey started acquiring Canadian art, focusing on works by well-known artists such as the Group of Seven, J. W. Morrice, Emily Carr, Alex Colville, and Christopher Pratt. He continued to grow the collection with guidance from his son Donald Sobey. Managed by the Sobey Art Foundation, established in 1981, the collection is displayed at Crombie House, the Sobey family home in Abercrombie, open to public viewing. It includes pieces from the 19th century to present. After Frank Sobey died, the collection expanded significantly by the acquisitions of Donald Sobey, who especially enjoyed the work of Kent Monkman. Donald's brother David Sobey was also a collector, along with Donald's three children. In 2002, the Sobey Art Foundation established the Sobey Art Award.

A two-year exhibition of works from the Sobey Art Collection, Generations: The Sobey Family & Canadian Art, began in 2022. A book of the same title was released to accompany the exhibition. Featuring 175 works collected by the Sobeys over three generations, the exhibition toured across Canada, with stops at the Art Gallery of Greater Victoria in British Columbia, the Art Gallery of Alberta in Edmonton, the Musée national des beaux-arts du Québec in Quebec City, the Confederation Centre of the Arts in Charlottetown, the Art Gallery of Nova Scotia in Halifax, the Rooms Provincial Art Gallery in St. John's, Newfoundland, and the McMichael Canadian Art Collection in Kleinburg, Ontario.

== Family members ==
- John William Sobey (1869–1949)
  - Frank H. Sobey OC (1902–1985)
    - William Sobey (1927–1989)
      - Frank C. Sobey
    - David Sobey CM (1931–2023)
      - Paul Sobey
    - Donald Sobey CM (1934–2021)
      - Robert Sobey ONS

== See also ==
- Irving family (New Brunswick)
- Weston family
- Frank Sobey: The Man and the Empire
