= South Colchester Academy =

Coordinates: 45.258825°N 63.267903°W

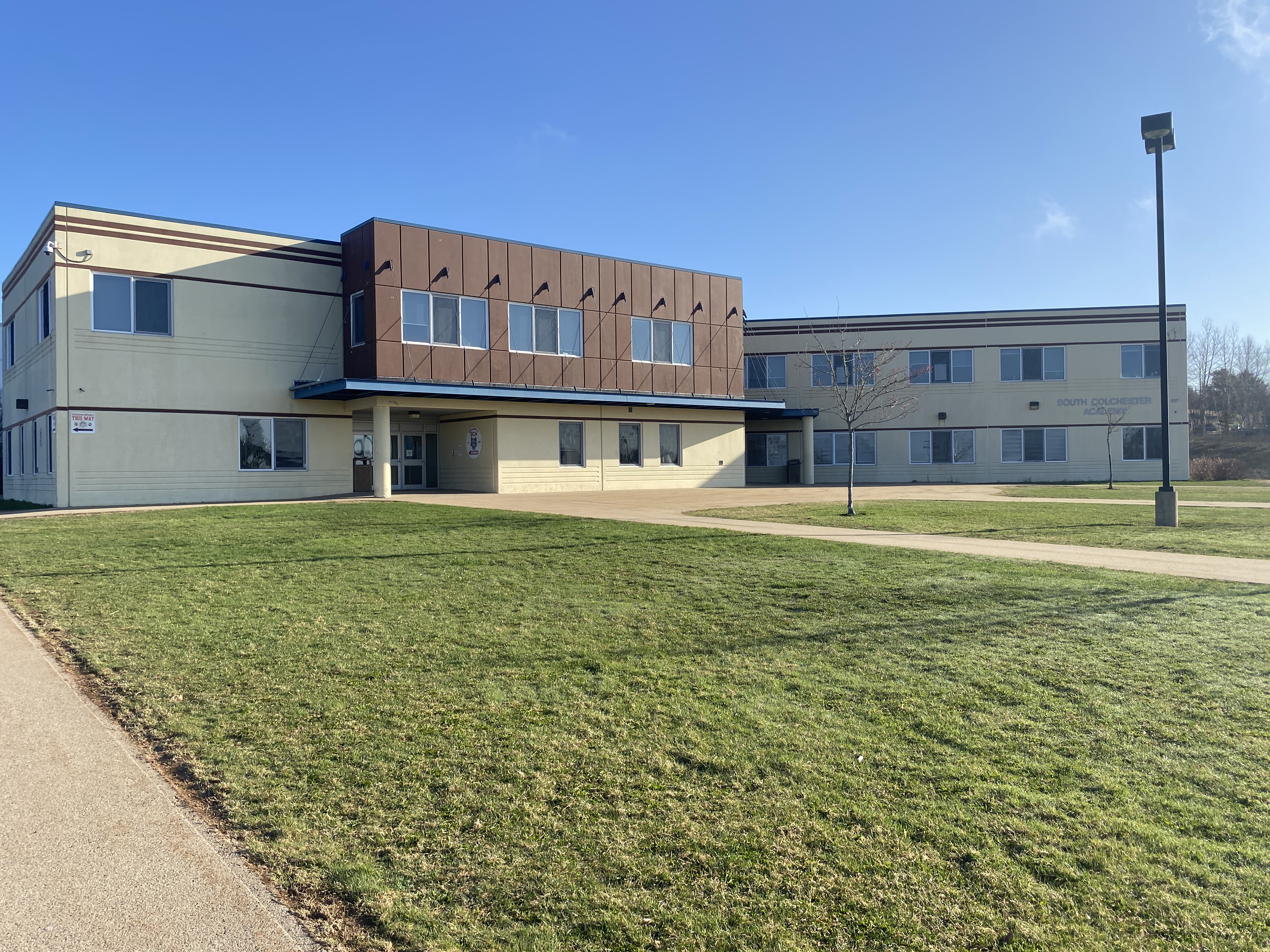
- A photo of South Colchester Academy, a high school located in Brookfield, Nova Scotia, Canada
- Brookfield, Nova Scotia; Canada

Information
- Type: High School
- Motto: "Pride & Loyalty"
- Established: September 2003
- Principal: Ginger Carson
- Grades: 7-12
- Enrollment: 562 (2024-25)
- Colors: Navy, Red and Cream
- Mascot: Wolf
- Website: https://sca.ccrce.ca

South Colchester Academy (SCA) is a secondary school located in Brookfield, Nova Scotia, Canada. The Academy serves approximately 560 students (2024–25) in grades 7 - 12. SCA opened in 2003, and has a number of features such as a 'cafetorium' that functions both as a cafeteria and an auditorium. The school is equipped in information technology resources, a double gymnasium, a fitness room, library, two fully equipped computer labs, an outdoor amphitheatre, track, two soccer fields, basketball courts and numerous other amenities.
