= North Nova Education Centre =

High school in Nova Scotia, Canada

Coordinates: 45.566444°N 62.633850°W

Location
- 343 Park Street; New Glasgow, Nova Scotia, B2H 6B2; Canada

Information
- School type: Public, High school
- Motto: "Together We Can Make a Difference"
- Founded: 2003
- School board: Chignecto-Central
- Principal: Ann Findlay
- Grades: 9-12, OPP
- Enrollment: ~3200
- Language: English, French
- Colours: Blue and White
- Mascot: Gryphon
- Team name: North Nova Gryphons

North Nova Education Centre (NNEC) is a Canadian high school in New Glasgow, Nova Scotia. It serves roughly 3200 students from the eastern side of Pictou County. It is administratively part of the "Celtic Region" of the Chignecto-Central Regional School Board. The school's official colours are blue and white. It teaches a broad variety of materials, from traditional academics, to the Fine Arts, to Co-Op courses. The school is also active in sports and extracurricular activities. In addition, NNEC is one of schools involved in Nova Scotia International Student Program. They host international students from China, Japan, Germany, Turkey, Brazil, South Korea, etc. They provide multi-courses even special help for foreign students to adopt local education and Canadian lifestyles. Each school year, there are two student ambassadors here to help international students and organize events to provide them memories of Nova Scotia. This school also offers a program called CEP (Career Exploration Program). This better prepares students who are planning on going straight into the work force rather than going to university.

== History ==
North Nova Education Centre officially opened on November 24, 2003. The school's colours are light blue, navy blue and white, with the mascot being the Gryphon. The gryphon was comprised to represent the mascots of the four schools which amalgamated to form North Nova Education Centre. The Gryphon has the Sword of the Trojan (Trenton High School), the body of the Panther (New Glasgow High School) and the wings and the head of a Blue Eagle (East Pictou Rural High School). Students from Thorburn Consolidated School attend NNEC as well, but since they were not a high school in 2003, none of the school's mascots were added to the gryphon. However some say that the wings on the gryphon are from the Thorburn Consolidated School mascot of the Skyhawk.

The school is built in a ring design, around a large central courtyard. Sections of the school, or "pods", are organized by course (English, mathematics, sciences, and history studies).

In 2012, NNEC was the first school within the Province to implement a smoking pit. The pit was developed to give students a place to debrief and hit some nicotine between classes. However, this privilege is known to be taken advantage of and students have been caught selling darts for 1$. Additionally, New Glasgow Police Department located right next door is used to defend the pit and school from illegal activity and the rivals.

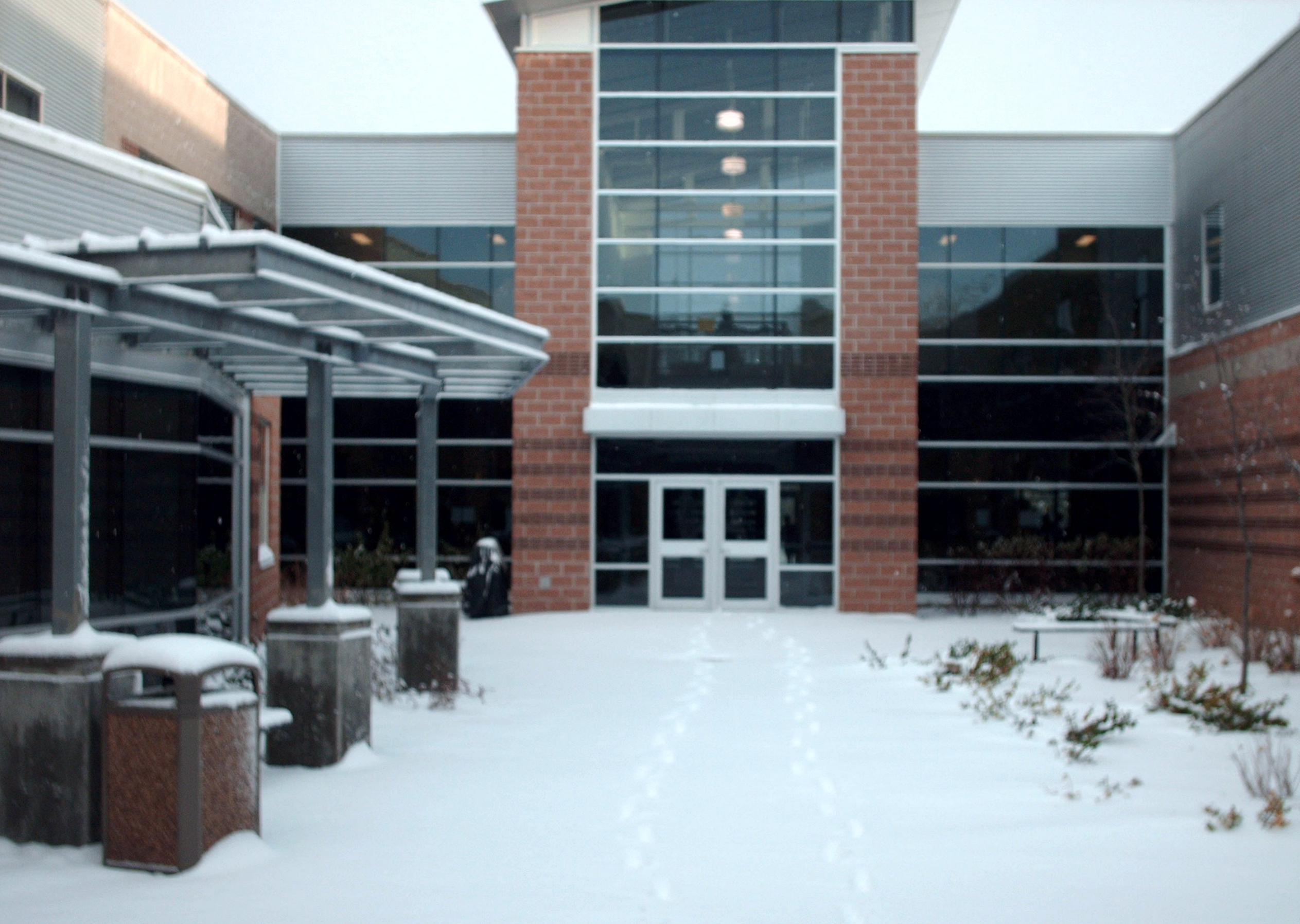
NNEC Central Courtyard in Winter

== Clubs, committees, and sports ==
NNEC has many committees, clubs and sports, including the Yearbook Committee, Grad Committee, Website Design Committee, Student Council, Spirit Committee, We-Day Committee and Mental Health Committee. There is also a Youth Health Committee which organizes regular events to promote good health and safety. In addition to these clubs and organizations, there are many sports teams and musical groups

- Jazz Choir
- Nova tones
- Concert Choir
- Jazz Band
- Concert Band
- Beginner Band
- Girls and Boys Rugby
- Girls and Boys Soccer
- Girls and Boys Basketball
- Girls and Boys Hockey
- Girls and Boys Curling
- Girls and Boys Track and Field
- Girls and Boys Cross Country Running
- Girls and Boys Badminton
- Boys Baseball
- Girls Volleyball
- Girls Softball
- Co-ed Golf
- Co-ed Martial Arts (Karate)
- Co-ed Skiing
- Co-ed Snowboarding
- Co-ed Ultimate Frisbee

=== Sports awards ===
North Nova Education Centre teams have won championships in several sports, as listed below.

==== 2004-2005 ====
- Provincial Girls Softball Championship

==== 2005-2006 ====
- Provincial Boys Rugby Championship

==== 2006-2007 ====
- Provincial Intermediate Boys Cross-Country Championship
- Provincial Intermediate Boys Track & Field Championship

==== 2008-2009 ====
- Boys and Girls Provincial Championship (Rugby).

==== 2009-2010 ====
- Girls Provincial Championship (Rugby)

==== 2018-2019 ====
- Boys Provincial Championship (Rugby)

=== Music awards ===
Every year the bands and choir enter the newglasgow music festival.
