= Pictou County Transit =

Canadian transportation service

- Bus in front of New Glasgow Library

Overview
- Area served: Pictou County, Nova Scotia
- Transit type: Bus
- Line number: 2 bus routes
- Number of stations: 25
- Website: https://pctransit.ca/

Operation
- Began operation: 1926
- Operators: CHAD Transit; Town of New Glasgow; Town of Stellarton

Pictou County Transit is a Canadian public transport system consisting of two bus routes (one of which is split into three branches) in Pictou County, Nova Scotia, which serves the towns of New Glasgow, Pictou Landing First Nation, Stellarton, Trenton, Westville, and Pictou.

== History ==
=== First generation ===
Electric tramway service started on October 10, 1904, acting as the first transit service for New Glasgow. Tram service ran until May 7, 1931.

The modern bus public transit system was founded in 1926, running multiple routes throughout Pictou County.

Service ended on March 31, 1996 due to budget changes. As of that time, there were 5 bus routes and a fleet of 8 buses.

=== Second generation ===
In early 2020, the provincial government announced an investment of $200,000 toward the establishment of a three-year public transit pilot project serving Stellarton and New Glasgow. The service launched on 17 May 2021.

The bus route was adjusted in September 2022.

In February 2023, joint government funding of $593,931 was announced for the purchase of two additional buses and the creation of five new bus stops.

In July 2023, Pictou County Transit was approved for additional provincial funding through the Community Transportation Assistance Program.

In 2024, Pictou County Transit made plans to expand their service with more bus routes in Spring 2024

In February of 2024, it was announced that the service would be made permanent, having completed its three-year trial period.

In June 2024, Route 2 was launched, servicing the outlying communities of Trenton, Westville and Pictou Landing First Nation.

==== System redesign ====
A system redesign was launched in 2025 and completed through 2026, aiming to improve the service. This included several service adjustments to both route 1 and route 2. New bus shelters were added to several of the stops, and new map signage was also added to all bus stops. The system was also integrated on Apple Maps and Google Maps, allowing users to plan trips online. Route 2 was split into route 2, route 2A and route 2B as part of the service improvements. Sunday service was added to route 1.

== Transit routes ==
Two main routes are operated. Route 2 is split in three branches serving different areas. 2ᴀ and 2ʙ alternate their service, both separately run every 4 hours, giving service every 2 hours combined.

No.	Route Name	Notes
1	Main route	Runs hourly Monday to Sunday
2	Expansion route (Westville)	Runs every two hours Monday to Saturday
2ᴀ	Expansion route (Pictou)	Alternating service between 2ᴀ and 2ʙ, running every 2 hours
2ʙ	Expansion route (Pictou Landing First Nation)	Alternating service between 2ᴀ and 2ʙ, running every 2 hours

== Fares ==
A fare for route 1 is $3.00. Fares for route 2 including branches are $5.00, allowing a transfer to route 1. Payment is made on the bus with either cash or credit/debit card.

Fares are sold as:

- Single ride
- Day pass
- Month pass (Route 1 only)

Month passes are purchased at the New Glasgow or Stellarton town halls.
