= Amherst Regional High School (Nova Scotia) =

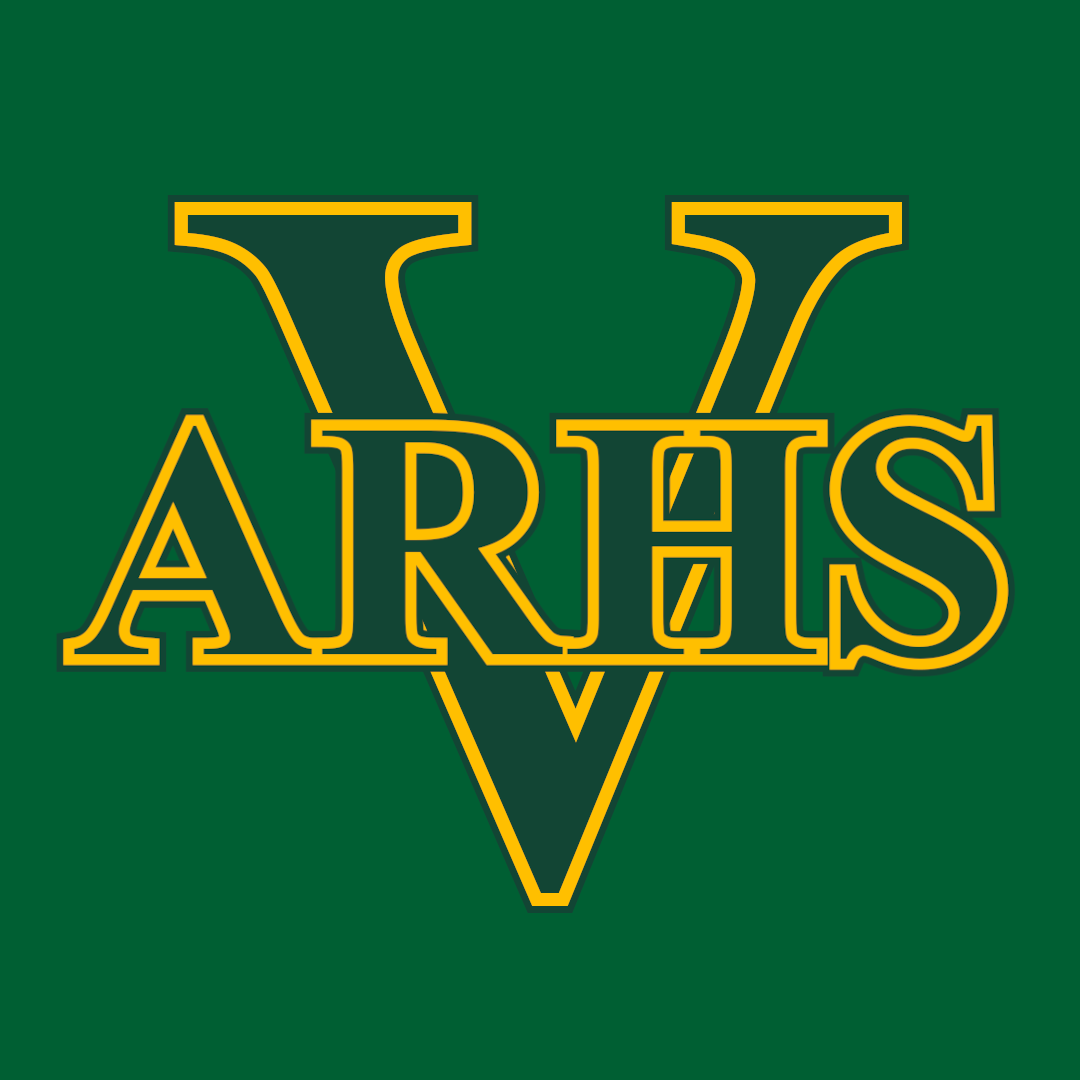

Location
- 190 Willow Street; Amherst, Nova Scotia, B4H 3W5; Canada; 45°49′50.35″N 64°11′21.93″W

Information
- Type: Public/Private Partner High school
- Established: 1818
- School board: Chignecto-Central
- Principal: Aaron Stubbert
- Grades: 9 to 12, Returning Graduate
- Colours: Green and gold
- Athletics: Baseball, Soccer, Golf, Cross Country, Basketball, Track and Field, Slo-Pitch, Table Tennis, Badminton
- Mascot: Victor the Viking
- Website: arhs.ccrsb.ca

Amherst Regional High School (ARHS) is located in Amherst, Nova Scotia, Canada. The school delivers classes from grade 9 to 12, offers Skilled Trades, Culinary Trades, Options and Opportunities (O2) and hosts the largest allocation of NSISP (Nova Scotia International Student Program) students in Nova Scotia.

The first ARHS location opened in 1893 on Spring Street. It closed in 2000 when the "new" Amherst Regional High School opened on Willow Street. The new ARHS was the last of the "Private Partner" schools in Nova Scotia.

The new location includes a regulation high school gymnasium and a 493-seat auditorium.
