= Lyons Brook, Nova Scotia =

Community in Nova Scotia, Canada

Coordinates: 45°40′15.6″N 62°46′44.2″W

Lyons Brook is a community in the Canadian province of Nova Scotia, located in Pictou County.

Located along the West River of Pictou, Lyons Brook is immediately west of the town of Pictou and has several newer subdivisions as well as older homes fronting the river.

The community is located on a former CN Rail line that ran from Oxford Junction to Pictou and on to Stellarton. Rail service was abandoned in 1986 and the tracks were removed in 1989.

== History ==
Lyons Brook was the first entry point for English speaking settlers who came to the province's northern shore in 1767, arriving on the Ship Betsey.

The Betsey left Philadelphia on May 4, 1767, and arrived in Pictou Harbour on June 10, 1767, but its passengers didn't actually make it to shore until June 11. Seven families were on board, including the Harris and Patterson families, who later played a significant role in the establishment of the Town of Pictou.

By the time the Ship Hector got here in 1776, there were 100 people living in Lyons Brook.

Lyons Brook is home to West Pictou Consolidated School and the former childhood home of Canadian grocery titan Frank H. Sobey.

The Whiffen Brewing Company, operates Uncle Leo's Brewery in Lyons Brook and next door to Lyons Brook Piping & Welding. Lyons Brook is also the location of Birchwood Campgrounds and Korean food establishment Pictou Lunch Box.

== Notable people ==
- Frank H. Sobey (Founder of Sobeys)
