= Westville, Nova Scotia =

Westville Baile an Iar (Scottish Gaelic)
- Town
- Nickname: The Gateway to Northern Nova Scotia
- Location within Nova Scotia
- Coordinates: 45°33′N 62°42′W
- Country: Canada
- Province: Nova Scotia
- Municipality: Pictou County
- Incorporated: August 20, 1894

Government
  - Mayor: Lennie White
  - Governing Body: Westville Council
  - MLA: Tim Houston (PC)
  - MP: Sean Fraser (L)

Area
  - Total: 14.24 km^{2} (5.50 sq mi)
- Elevation: 70.1 m (230 ft)

Population (2021)
  - Total: 3,540
  - Density: 248.6/km^{2} (644/sq mi)
  - Change (2016-21): ▼2.4%
- Demonym: Westvillian
- Time zone: UTC-4 (AST)
  - Summer (DST): UTC-3 (ADT)
- Postal code span: B0K 2A0
- Area code: 902
- Telephone Exchange: 396
- NTS Map: 11E10 New Glasgow
- GNBC Code: CBOLU
- Website: westville.ca

Westville is a town in Pictou County, Nova Scotia, Canada. It is located immediately west of Stellarton and about four kilometres southwest of New Glasgow, the major town in the area.

== History ==
Originally called Acadian Village, the name Westville was chosen because the community was west of the Albion Mines (now Stellarton).

Westville has a long history of coal mining dating back to 1864 when coal was first discovered. The opening of the Acadia Mine followed in 1866. Westville, along with Stellarton, was once home to a thriving coal mining industry. At its peak, during World War I, Westville boasted three underground workings; the Black Diamond, the Acadia, and the Drummond. Westville was the site of the Drummond Mine explosion on May 13, 1873.

The last underground mine, the Drummond pit, closed in the 1970s. Extensive open-pit mining on the Drummond and Acadia sites was carried out throughout the 1980s and 1990s, by Pioneer Coal Limited of Antigonish, Nova Scotia.

In the early 1900s Westville also boasted the largest natural ice skating rink east of Montreal. Today the miner's monument at Acadia Park honoring those touched by the town's mining disasters, and a community centre is all that remains of its proud coal mining heritage. The war memorial was sculpted by the renowned Emanuel Hahn.

Like many coal towns Westville was a hotbed of sports. Baseball was very popular among the miners. One of the Westville baseball teams was crowned Maritime champion in 1927 and the legendary Babe Ruth visited the town in 1936 and hit a ball over the centre field fence. The town also sponsored championship cricket, lacrosse, football and hockey teams.

== Demographics ==
In the 2021 Census of Population conducted by Statistics Canada, Westville had a population of 3,540 living in 1,567 of its 1,660 total private dwellings, a change of −2.4% from its 2016 population of 3,628. With a land area of 14.24 km^{2} (5.50 sq mi), it had a population density of 248.6/km^{2} (643.9/sq mi) in 2021.

== Amenities ==
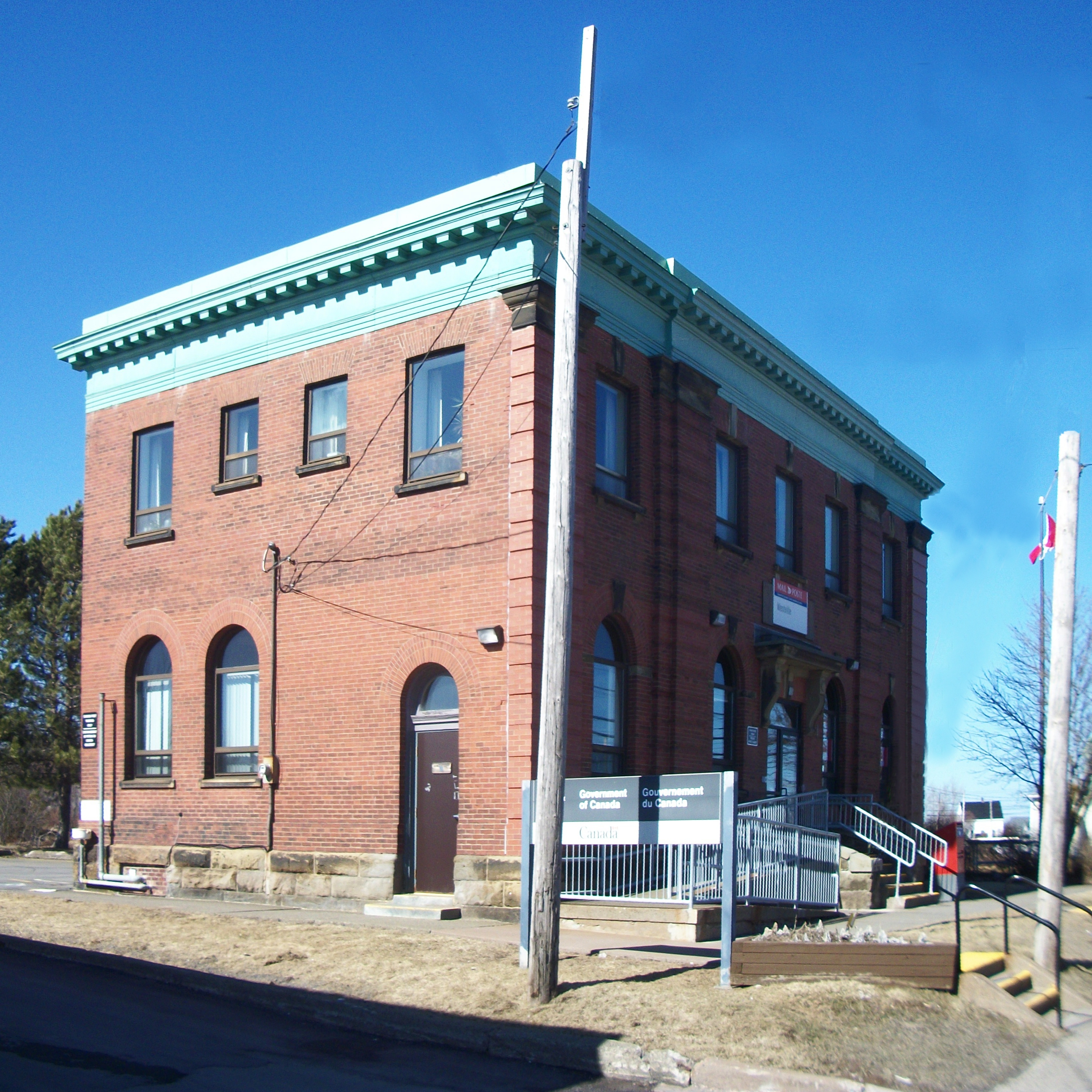
The Westville post office was built sometime between 1904 and 1916.

While mainly a bedroom community, Westville's Main Street features banks, shops, restaurants and other amenities. A Nova Scotia highway rest stop was opened at the end of Cowan Street off exit 21 of Highway 104, part of the Trans-Canada Highway.

One of the largest Canada Day celebrations in Atlantic Canada takes place in Westville. The five-day event includes a county fair, street parade, and annual guest bands from around the world. The year 2007 marked the 100th anniversary of Westville's Canada Day celebrations.

== Transportation ==
Pictou County Transit, a public bus system, links the town with nearby Trenton, New Glasgow, Stellarton, and Pictou.

== Notable residents ==
Historical population
Year	Pop.	±%
1901	3,471	—
1911	4,417	+27.3%
1921	4,550	+3.0%
1931	3,946	−13.3%
1941	4,115	+4.3%
1951	4,301	+4.5%
1956	4,247	−1.3%
1961	4,159	−2.1%
1981	4,522	+8.7%
1986	4,271	−5.6%
1991	4,228	−1.0%
1996	3,976	−6.0%
2001	3,879	−2.4%
2006	3,805	−1.9%
2011	3,798	−0.2%
2016	3,628	−4.5%
2021	3,540	−2.4%

- Russell MacEwan, lawyer, Member of Parliament and judge

== See also ==
- List of municipalities in Nova Scotia
