= List of islands by name (B) =

This article features a list of islands sorted by their name beginning with the letter B.

== B ==
Island's Name	Island group(s)	Country/Countries
Bacelos	Alentejo Islands, Alentejo	Portugal
Bacelos Pequena	Alentejo Islands, Alentejo	Portugal
Badgely	Georgian Bay, Ontario	Canada
Badger Island	Great Salt Lake, Utah	United States
Badger	Lake Winnipesaukee, New Hampshire	United States
Baffin	Nunavut	Canada
Bågø	Islands of the Little Belt	Denmark
Bahrain Island	Persian Gulf	Bahrain
Baillie-Hamilton	Nunavut	Canada
Bainbridge	Puget Sound, Washington	United States
Baker	Allegheny River, Pennsylvania	United States
Bald Eagle	Allegheny River, Pennsylvania	United States
Baleal	Estremadura islands	Portugal
Bali	Lesser Sunda Islands	Indonesia
Balta	Shetland Islands	Scotland
Baltrum	East Frisian Islands	Germany
Baluan	Admiralty Islands	Papua New Guinea
Bananec	Glénan islands	France
Banfills	Mississippi River, Minnesota	United States
Bangaram	Lakshadweep	India
Banks	Northwest Territories	Canada
Baranof	Alexander Archipelago, Alaska	United States
Barbadoes	Schuylkill River, Pennsylvania	United States
Barbados	Lesser Antilles	Barbados
Bardwell	Illinois River, Illinois	United States
Barents Island	Svalbard	Norway
Barentsøya	Svalbard	Norway
Barkis	Mississippi River, Illinois	United States
Barnes	San Juan Islands, Washington	United States
Barnston	Fraser River, British Columbia	Canada
Barra	Outer Hebrides	Scotland
Barren	Falkland Islands	United Kingdom
Barren	North Channel, Ontario	Canada
Barreta	Algarve islands	Portugal
Barrie	North Channel, Ontario	Canada
Barrier	Georgian Bay, Ontario	Canada
Barro	Algarve islands	Portugal
Barsø	Islands of the Little Belt	Denmark
Barter	Arctic Sea, Alaska	United States
Bartlett	Maine	United States
Basse-Terre	Guadeloupe, Lesser Antilles	France
Bassett	Lake Ontario, Ontario	Canada
Bassett	Lake Saint Clair, Ontario	Canada
Batanta	Raja Ampat Islands	Indonesia
Bateau	Georgian Bay, Ontario	Canada
Bateman	Louisiana	United States
Bateman	Washington	United States
Bathurst	Queen Elizabeth Islands, Nunavut	Canada
Batture	North Channel, Ontario	Canada
Batz	Brittany	France
Bazaruto	Bazaruto Archipelago	Mozambique
Beacon	Houtman Abrolhos, Western Australia	Australia
Beacon	Playgreen Lake, Manitoba	Canada
Beacon	Newfoundland and Labrador	Canada
Beacon	Cumberland Sound, Nunavut	Canada
Beacon	Hudson Strait, Nunavut	Canada
Beacon	North Bay (Baffin Island), Nunavut	Canada
Beacon	Ungava Bay, Nunavut	Canada
Beacon	Kenora, Ontario	Canada
Beacon	Muskoka, Ontario	Canada
Beacon	Parry Sound, Ontario	Canada
Beacon	Peterborough, Ontario	Canada
Beacon	Renfrew, Ontario	Canada
Beacon	County of Frontenac, Ontario	Canada
Beacon (now subsided)	North Carolina	United States
Beals	Maine	United States
Beament	Lake Huron, Ontario	Canada
Bear	Lake Temagami, Ontario	Canada
Bear	Lake Winnipesaukee, New Hampshire	United States
Bear	Suncook River, New Hampshire	United States
Bears Back	North Channel, Ontario	Canada
Bears Rump	Georgian Bay, Ontario	Canada
Beata	Pedernales	Dominican Republic
Beauchene	Falkland Islands	United Kingdom
Beaupre	Cranberry Lake, Ontario	Canada
Beauregard	Barataria Bay, Louisiana	United States
Beaurivage	St. Lawrence River, Ontario	Canada
Beausoleil	Georgian Bay, Ontario	Canada
Beauty	North Channel, Ontario	Canada
Beaver		Antarctica
Beaver	Falkland Islands	United Kingdom
Beaver	Mississippi River, Iowa	United States
Beaver	North Channel, Ontario	Canada
Beaver	Beaver Island archipelago, Michigan	United States
Beaver	Isle Royale, Michigan	United States
Beaver	Massachusetts	United States
Beaver	Lake Winnipesaukee, New Hampshire	United States
Beaver	Rio Grande, Tamaulipas	Mexico
Beaverdam	Arkansas River, Arkansas	United States
Beckwith	Georgian Bay, Ontario	Canada
Belene	Danube River	Bulgaria
Bell Island	Newfoundland and Labrador	Canada
Belle Île		France
Belle Isle	Louisiana	United States
Belleau	North Channel, Ontario	Canada
Bellinghausen	Windward Islands, Society Islands, French Polynesia	Overseas Lands of France
Benbecula	Outer Hebrides	Scotland
Benguerra	Bazaruto Archipelago	Mozambique
Bennett	De Long Islands, Alaska	Claimed by the United States, controlled by Russia
Bere	Bantry Bay	Ireland
Bergmann	Mississippi River, Wisconsin	United States
Berlenga Grande	Berlengas	Portugal
Bermuda	The Bermuda Islands	United Kingdom
Big	Baffin Island, Nunavut	Canada
Big	Hudson Bay, Nunavut	Canada
Big	James Bay, Nunavut	Canada
Big	Lake Chemong, Ontario	Canada
Big	Lake Vernon, Ontario	Canada
Big	Pigeon Lake, Ontario	Canada
Big	Bay of Quinte, Ontario	Canada
Big	Skootamatta Lake, Ontario	Canada
Big	Lake of the Woods, Ontario	Canada
Big	Barataria Bay,Louisiana	United States
Big	(Disambiguation page)	Canada
Big	(Disambiguation page)	United States
Big Blue	Illinois River, Illinois	United States
Big Burnt	Georgian Bay, Ontario	Canada
Big Chicken	Lake Erie, Ontario	Canada
Bigga	Shetland Islands	Scotland
Bighorn	Lake Mead, Nevada	United States
Bigsby	Lake of the Woods, Ontario	Canada
Bigwin	Lake Muskoka, Ontario	Canada
Bikar	Bikar Atoll, Ratak Chain	Marshall Islands
Bikini	Bikini Atoll	Marshall Islands
Billingsgate	Cape Cod Bay, Massachusetts	United States
Bioko	Gulf of Guinea	Equatorial Guinea
Birch	Lake Winnipesaukee, New Hampshire	United States
Birch Hill	Lake Winnipesaukee, New Hampshire	United States
Bird	Algoa Bay	South Africa
Bird	Caribbean	disputed by Venezuela and Dominica
Bird	Whitsunday Islands, Queensland	Australia
Bird	North Queensland, Queensland	Australia
Bird	Seychelles	Seychelles
Bird	(South Georgia and the South Sandwich Islands) South Georgia	United Kingdom
Bird	Buzzards Bay, Massachusetts	United States
Bird	Fox Islands group of the Aleutian Islands, Alaska	United States
Bird	Lake Zway	Ethiopia
Bird Island	Lesser Antilles	Antigua and Barbuda
Bird Key		United States
Birkholm	Islands of the waters south of Funen	Denmark
Björkö	Lake Mälaren	Sweden
Biševo	Adriatic Sea	Croatia
Bishop Rock	Isles of Scilly	United Kingdom
Bishop Island	Lesser Antilles	Antigua and Barbuda
Bitra	Lakshadweep	India
Bjørnø	Islands of the waters south of Funen	Denmark
Bjørnøya	Svalbard	Norway
Black	Lake Abitibi, Ontario	Canada
Black Fox	Allegheny River, Pennsylvania	United States
Black Prince	Louisiana	United States
Black Rock		
Blake Island	Lesser Antilles	Antigua and Barbuda
Blakeley	Mobile Bay, Alabama	United States
Blakely	San Juan Islands, Washington	United States
Blaker Towhead	Mississippi River, Tennessee	United States
Blanchard	Mississippi River, Illinois	United States
Bleaker	Falkland Islands	United Kingdom
Bleanish	Lough Erne	Ireland
Blennerhassett	Ohio River, West Virginia	United States
Blind	San Juan Islands, Washington	United States
Block	Atlantic Ocean, Rhode Island	United States
Blueberry Island	Lake Wanapitei, Ontario	Canada
Boega	Minho islands	Portugal
Bogø	Baltic Sea	Denmark
Bogoslof Island	Bering Sea, Alaska	United States
Bois Blanc	Detroit River, Ontario	Canada
Bois Blanc	Lake Huron, Michigan	United States
Bokak Atoll	Ratak Chain	Marshall Islands
Bokissa	Pacific Ocean	Vanuatu
Bolama	Bissagos Islands	Guinea-Bissau
Bolivar	Texas	United States
Bolter	Mississippi River, Illinois	United States
Bømlo	Sunnhordland	Norway
Bonaire	Lesser Antilles	Netherlands
Bonanza	Lake Wanapitei, Ontario	Canada
Bone	Georgian Bay, Ontario	Canada
Bonhomme	Missouri River, Missouri	United States
Bonnet Carre	Mississippi River, Louisiana	United States
Bora Bora	Windward Islands, Society Islands, French Polynesia	Overseas Lands of France
Borden	Queen Elizabeth Islands, Nunavut	Canada
Borðoy	Faroe Islands	Denmark
Borkum	East Frisian Islands	Germany
Borneo	Malay Archipelago	Divided between Indonesia, Malaysia, and Brunei
Bornholm	Baltic Sea	Denmark
Borradaile	Balleny Islands	Ross Dependency, New Zealand
Bourinot	North Channel, Ontario	Canada
Bouvetoya	South Atlantic Ocean	Norway
Bowen	Gulf Islands, British Columbia	Canada
Boyd	Holston River, Tennessee	United States
Boyuk Zira	Baku Archipelago	Azerbaijan
Bozcaada	Aegean Islands	Turkey
Brač	Adriatic Sea	Croatia
Brandsø	Islands of the Little Belt	Denmark
Brännö	Southern Gothenburg Archipelago	Sweden
Brant	Mississippi River Delta, Louisiana	United States
Bray	Nunavut	Canada
Brecqhou	Brechou Channel Islands	(United Kingdom) Crown dependency
Breeze	Stoney Lake, Ontario	Canada
Breezy	Lake Winnipesaukee, New Hampshire	United States
Bréhat		France
Bremangerlandet	Vestland	Norway
Bressay	Shetland Islands	Scotland
Bridgeman	South Shetland Islands	Claimed by Argentine Antarctica, Argentina, Antártica Chilena Province of Chile, and the British Antarctic Territory of theUnited Kingdom
Brijuni	Adriatic Sea	Croatia
Broadview	Gloucester Pool, Ontario	Canada
Brodeur	Lake Superior, Ontario	Canada
Brother	Niagara River, New York	United States
Brother	Shetland Islands	Scotland
Browns Island	Great Salt Lake, Utah	United States
Brown	San Juan Islands, Washington	United States
Browning	Lake Muskoka, Ontario	Canada
Browns	Louisiana	United States
Browns	West Virginia	United States
Brownsea	Poole Harbour, Dorset, England	United Kingdom
Brownscombe	Stoney Lake, Ontario	Canada
Brunec	Glénan islands	France
Brunot	Ohio River, Pennsylvania	United States
Bruny	Tasmania	Australia
Bruray	Outer Skerries, Shetland Islands	Scotland
Brush	Timbalier Bay, Louisiana	United States
Bryher	Isles of Scilly	United Kingdom
Bu Sadah	Hawar Islands	Bahrain
Bu Tammur	Hawar Islands	Bahrain
Bubaque	Bissagos Islands	Guinea-Bissau
Bubiyan	Persian Gulf	Kuwait
Buchhorst	Trave river	Germany
Buck	U.S. Virgin Islands	United States
Buckle	Balleny Islands	Ross Dependency, New Zealand
Buckley	West Virginia	United States
Buffington	West Virginia	United States
Bugio	Estremadura islands	Portugal
Bugio	Madeira	Portugal
Buláti-sziget	Tisza	Hungary
Buldir	Aleutian Islands, Alaska	United States
Bull	Dublin Bay	Ireland
Bull	Atlantic Ocean, South Carolina	United States
Bulla	Caspian Sea	Azerbaijan
Bunce	Sierra Leone River	Sierra Leone
Buneh	Persian Gulf	Claimed byIran
Buøy	Island in Øyane archipelago, Stavanger Municipality, Rogaland	Norway
Burano	Venetian Lagoon	Italy
Burgazada	Princes' Islands	Turkey
Burhou	Channel Islands	Guernsey
Burias Island	Masbate	Philippines
Burke Island	Lake Huron, Ontario	Canada
Burlington	Mississippi River, Illinois	United States
Burlington	Delaware River, New Jersey	United States
Burns	Tennessee River, Tennessee	United States
Burnt	Lake Nipissing, Ontario	Canada
Burnt	Windy Lake, Ontario	Canada
Burra	Shetland Islands	Scotland
Burray	Orkney Islands	Scotland
Burrit	Lake Nipissing, Ontario	Canada
Burton	Lake Champlain, Vermont	United States
Bushes	Platte River, Nebraska	United States
Bussell	Tennessee River, Tennessee	United States
Bustard	Georgian Bay, Ontario	Canada
Butler	Lake Champlain, Vermont	United States
Büyükada	Princes' Islands	Turkey
Buzzard	Mississippi River, Illinois	United States
Byam Martin	Nunavut	Canada
Bylot	Nunavut	Canada

== See also ==
- List of islands (by country)
- List of islands by area
- List of islands by population
- List of islands by highest point
