= Beacon (disambiguation) =

A beacon is an intentionally conspicuous device designed to attract attention to a specific location. A common historical example was the fire beacon, for sending optical signals.

Beacon may also refer to:

== Arts, entertainment and media ==
=== Music ===
- Beacon (band), an American electronic music group
- Beacons (festival), a British music festival
- Beacon (Two Door Cinema Club album), 2012
- Beacon (Susumu Hirasawa album), 2021
- Beacons (EP), by I Like Trains, 2012
- Beacons, a 2009 album by Ohbijou

=== Other uses in arts, entertainment and media ===
- Beacon (character), the name of two fictional characters
- Beacon (Scheer), an art installation in New York, U.S.
- Beacon, a magazine published on the Isle of Wight by Total Sense Media

== Businesses and organisations ==
=== Companies ===
- Beacon, a retail fuel brand of Valero Energy
- The Beacon, an online local news nonprofit in Kansas City.
- Beacon Communications (publisher), a publisher of weekly newspapers in Rhode Island, U.S.
- Beacon Communications Corporation, a defunct newspaper publisher in Massachusetts, U.S.
- Beacon Pictures an American film production company, also known as "Beacon Communications, LLC"
- Beacon Press, an American publisher
- Beacon UK, a private provider of mental health services in England
- Beacon Health Options a behavioral health company based in Boston, Massachusetts

=== Schools ===
- Beacon Status, a school designation in England
- Beacon high schools in Beijing, a school designation in China
- Beacon School (Stamford, Connecticut), U.S.
- Beacon English School, Korba, Chhattisgarh, India
- New Beacon School, formerly The Beacon, Sevenoaks, Kent, England
- The Beacon School, Manhattan, New York, U.S.
- The Beacon School, Banstead, Surrey, England
- Beacon Academy, Crowborough, formerly Beacon Community College, Crowborough, East Sussex, England
- Beacon Academy, Cleethorpes, North East Lincolnshire, England
- The Beacon Academy, Biñan, Philippines
- Beacon College in Leesburg, Florida, U.S.
- Beacon College (Hong Kong)

== Places ==
- Beacon, Western Australia
- Beacon, Cornwall, United Kingdom
- Beacon, Devon, Luppitt, United Kingdom
- Beacon, Yarcombe, a location in Devon, United Kingdom
- Beacon (ward), Dorset, United Kingdom
- Beacon, Newark-on-Trent, Nottinghamshire, United Kingdom
- Beacon, Iowa, U.S.
- Beacon, Jersey City, New Jersey, U.S.
- Beacon, New York, U.S.
  - Beacon station
  - Beacon Mountain
- Beacon Valley, Antarctica

== Transportation and military ==
- MV Beacon, a ship, later Empire Guernsey
- HMS Beacon, various ships of the Royal Navy
- USS Beacon, various ships of the U.S. Navy

== Other uses ==
- Beacon (apple), a cultivar of apple
- Beacon (streaming service), a boutique subscription streaming service by Critical Role Productions
- Beacon Supergroup, a rock formation in Antarctica
- Beacon-class gunvessel, 19th century British ships
- Beacon, an Appro supercomputer
- 'Beacon', a cultivar of barley
- Beacon, an oscillator in Conway's Game of Life
- Bluetooth Low Energy beacon, providing location to devices in its vicinity
- Facebook Beacon, advertising software
- Project Beacon, an early American space satellite program
- Rotating beacon (disambiguation)
- Valparaiso Beacons, the athletic program of Valparaiso University in Indiana
- Web beacon, an Internet web tracking technique

== See also ==
- Bacon (disambiguation)
- The Beacon (disambiguation)
- Beacon Fell (disambiguation)
- Beacon Hill (disambiguation)
- Beacon Island (disambiguation)
