= Beaver Island =

Beaver Island may refer to the following places:

== Canada ==
- Beaver Island, Nova Scotia
- Beaver Island (Saskatchewan)

== Mexico ==
- Beaver Island (Rio Grande), transferred from the U.S. in the Boundary Treaty of 1970

== United States ==
- Beaver Island (Lake Michigan), Michigan
  - Beaver Island Airport
  - Beaver Island, Michigan, an unincorporated community located on the island
  - Beaver Islands State Wildlife Research Area
- Beaver Island (Lake Superior), Michigan
- Beaver Island State Park, New York
- Beaver Island Township, Stokes County, North Carolina
- Beaver Island (Massachusetts)
- Big Beaver Island, Lake Winnipesaukee, New Hampshire

== Other countries ==
- Beaver Island (Antarctica)
- Beaver Island, Falkland Islands
