= Big Island =

Big Island may refer to:

== Canada ==
- Big Island (Newfoundland and Labrador)
- Big Island, Nova Scotia, a peninsula in Pictou County
- Big Island Provincial Park, a provincial park in Alberta

=== Nunavut ===
- Big Island (Chesterfield Inlet), located in Thelon River near the mouth of Chesterfield Inlet; see Imiliit
- Big Island (Hudson Bay, Nunavut), near Puvirnituq, Quebec
- Big Island (James Bay, Nunavut), near Chisasibi, Quebec
- Qikiqtarjuaq (Hudson Strait), formerly Big Island, near Kimmirut

=== Ontario ===
- Big Island (Bay of Quinte)
- Big Island (Lake Chemong), in Chemong Lake
- Big Island (Lake of the Woods), in Lake of the Woods
- Big Island (Pigeon Lake), in Pigeon Lake

== Malaysia ==
- Big Island, Johor
- Big Island, Malaysia, in Malacca

== New Zealand ==
- Big Island (New Zealand)

== United Kingdom ==
- Big Island (Northern Ireland)

== United States ==
=== New Hampshire ===
- Big Island (Pawtuckaway Lake), in Pawtuckaway Lake
- Big Island (Umbagog Lake), in Umbagog Lake

=== New York ===
- Big Island (Chemung River), in Chemung County
- Big Island (Woodhull Lake), in Herkimer County

=== Other United States ===
- Big Island (Hawaii)
- Big Island Amusement Park, on Lake Minnetonka's Big Island, Minnesota
- Big Island, Ohio, an unincorporated community
- Big Island, Virginia, a census-designated place
- Big Island (Wood County, Wisconsin), in the Wisconsin River

== Other uses ==
- Naoto Ohshima (born 1964), Japanese artist and video game designer
