= Beacon Council =

Beacon Council may refer to:

- Beacon Council (award), a British local authority designation
- Beacon Council, BSA, a defunct Boy Scouts of America council

== See also ==
- Beacon (disambiguation)
