= The Beacon =

The Beacon may refer to:

== Film and television ==
- The Beacon (film), a 2009 American horror film
- "The Beacon" (The Twilight Zone), an episode of the TV series

== Literature ==
- The Beacon (novel), by Susan Hill, 2008

== Media ==
=== Newspapers ===
- The Beacon (Florida International University), a student newspaper
- The Beacon (University of Portland), a student newspaper
- The Beacon (Kansas City), online newspaper focusing on investigative journalism in Kansas City
- The Beacon, a student newspaper at Woodrow Wilson High School (Washington, D.C.)
- The Beacon, a diocesan newspaper published by the Roman Catholic Diocese of Paterson
- The Beacon Newspapers in Washington, D.C., Baltimore, Maryland and Howard County, Maryland

=== Magazine ===
- The Beacon, a magazine published by Breast Cancer Network Australia
- The Beacon, an alumni magazine published by Bushnell University
- The Beacon, a magazine published by the Lucis Trust, an American nonprofit organization focused on esoteric, occult philosophy
- The Beacon, literary magazine published monthly in Trinidad between 1931 and 1933

=== Newsletters ===
- The Beacon, a quarterly newsletter published by Friedman Place, an American nonprofit organization for blind adults

== Places and buildings ==
- The Beacon (Cleveland), Ohio, U.S., a residential tower in
- The Beacon, Cornwall, England, a hill
- The Beacon, Eastbourne, shopping centre
- The Beacon (Eastham, Massachusetts), U.S., a historic lighthouse
- The Beacon, Hemel Hempstead, Hertfordshire, England, a residential tower
- The Beacon (Jersey City), New Jersey, U.S., a restoration of former Jersey City Medical Center

== See also ==
- Beacon (disambiguation)
- Al-Manar ('The Beacon'), a Lebanese satellite television station
