= Pictou Landing =

Pictou Landing may refer to:

- Pictou Landing First Nation
- Pictou Landing, Nova Scotia
