= Boat Harbour =

Boat Harbour is the name of various localities:

== Australia ==
- Boat Harbour, New South Wales
- Boat Harbour, Tasmania
- Boat Harbour (Kurnell), Sydney
- Boat Harbour (Gerringong), New South Wales, a former port and site of a rock pool, originally spelled 'Boatharbour'.
- Boat Harbour, Western Australia, near Denmark, Western Australia
- Boat Harbour Beach, Tasmania

== Canada ==
- Boat Harbour, Newfoundland and Labrador
- Boat Harbour, Nova Scotia
- Boat Harbour West 37, Nova Scotia

== Elsewhere ==
- Boat Harbour, South Georgia, South Georgia and the South Sandwich Islands

== See also ==
- Marina
