= Big Cove =

Big Cove may refer to:

- Big Cove, Alabama, U.S.
- Big Cove YMCA Camp, in Nova Scotia, Canada
- Elsipogtog First Nation, a First Nation community in Canada
