= Pictou Landing, Nova Scotia =

Community in Nova Scotia, Canada

Coordinates: 45°39′58″N 62°41′0″W

Pictou Landing in Nova Scotia

Pictou Landing (Gaelic Àite an Luchd-Àiteachaidh) is a community in the Canadian province of Nova Scotia, located in Pictou County.

== Geography ==
It is situated on the south shore of Pictou Harbour across from the town of Pictou.

== History ==
Its name is probably derived from the fact that it is the landing place for ferries crossing the harbour. An earlier name for the area was Fishers Grant after a grant of land made to John Fisher in 1765. The only populated reserve of the Pictou Landing First Nation is named Fisher's Grant 24 and is located 3 km north-east of Pictou Landing.

The Nova Scotia Railway reached here in 1867. It was the main route for travelers to Upper Canada in the ice-free months until the opening of the Intercolonial Railway in 1876. The steamship Mayflower carried passengers and freight across the harbour. A map published in 1879 shows four piers at Pictou Landing, three of them carrying track of the Intercolonial rail road and two of these piers belonging to coal companies.
