= Beacon Island =

Beacon Island may refer to several places:

== Australia ==
- Beacon Island (Houtman Abrolhos), part of the Houtman Abrolhos off the Western Australian coast

== Canada ==
- Beacon Island (Hudson Strait), Canada, lying off Dorset Island
- Beacon Island (Ungava Bay), off Cape Naujaat, Canada
- Anguttuaq formerly Beacon Island near Kimmirut, Canada
- Upajjana, formerly Beacon Island, Cumberland Sound, Canada

== Seychelles ==
- Sèche Island (Beacon Island), Seychelles

== South Africa ==
- Beacon Island, Plettenberg Bay, South Africa

== United States ==
- Beacon Island, North Carolina, an island that was in the Ocracoke Inlet near Okrakoke Island

== See also ==
- List of islands by name (B)
