= Goodman Department Store =

Goodman Department Stores was a retail chain in Pictou County, Nova Scotia. It operated 34 departments between 1904 and 1985.The store was founded by European Brothers Harry and Sol Goodman and Harry's in-laws the Vinebergs of Quebec from the proceeds of fur and fish trading and the transfer of inventory from three small Quebec stores established earlier.

Located in downtown New Glasgow the original and principal store was known as Vineberg, Goodman & Co. By 1931 it had expanded to three buildings from its Provost Street location incorporating the original Itiz Movie Theatre.The buildings were connected by a tunnel underneath the mainline railway running to Cape Breton. Department store Branches were established in Truro, Nova Scotia 1929 and in Antigonish, Nova Scotia in 1932 . By 1931 Harry and Sol Goodman took over the Nova Scotia operation leaving the Vinebergs to continue with a retail business which by that time operated stores in Montréal and Ottawa under the name Larocque. Sol and Harry Goodman divided their business in 1946, and thereafter Goodman Company Ltd. operated under the direction of Harry and then his four sons: Hyman, Waldo, Bernie, and Dr. Nordau Goodman until its closure in 1985 except as interrupted by wartime service.

The third floor of the building operated as a public auditorium. During the second world war Goodman Auditorium as it was called served as an armoury and drill hall. In 1988 the New Glasgow structures were re-purposed into a shopping centre by Antigonish entrepreneur Brian MacLeod and local lawyers Richard Goodman Q.C., and Gregory MacDonald Q.C. whose firm became occupants on the second floor. The buildings, now called Goodman Place, have passed out of the ownership the Goodman family. Goodman's occupied a physically central location in the downtown area of New Glasgow, providing a public bus stop for the community as a whole. The Goodman Rotary Park on the west side of the East River of New Glasgow offers a view point of this former department store.
