= Big Cove YMCA Camp =

Coordinates: 45.60598°N 62.50955°W

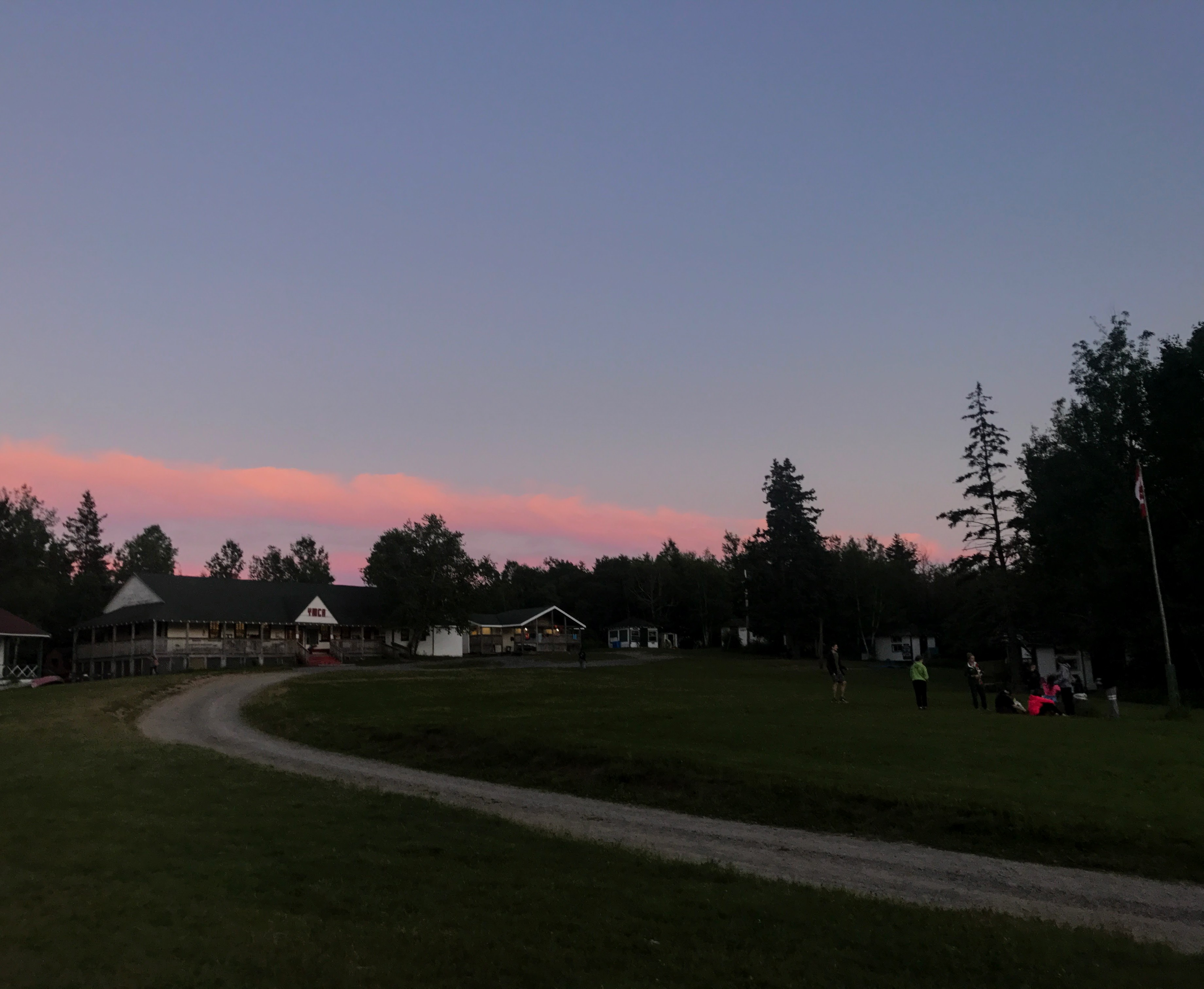

Big Cove YMCA Camp or Big Cove, is a residential camp for children aged 6–16 located in Sutherlands River, Nova Scotia. The camp is the oldest residential camp in Canada, founded by what is now called the YMCA of Greater Halifax/Dartmouth in 1889. It is located on a 100-acre peninsula on Merigomish Harbour in Pictou County.

== Seasons ==
=== Summer ===
Big Cove's summer season runs for eight weeks; with two-month-long leadership sessions, three two-week sessions (offered to Juniors and Seniors), eight one-week sessions (offered to Juniors and Seniors), and four three-day sessions (offered to Little Big Cove). These sessions start the first weekend of July and run through to the end of August. Big Cove employs 45-50 staff and has an approximate capacity of 104 campers and 32 Leadership participants.

=== Spring and fall ===
During the spring and fall sessions, Big Cove is open to school or community groups to rent and use the facilities. During these times there is program staff on hand to provide programming and support to the group on site. Big Cove also provides all amenities needed including a cook. Although swimming is not available, many other program areas are fully functional; including high-ropes, archery, hiking, among others. The average group stays for three days and during the stay, they will participate in six program areas, as well as have a campfire, participate in a 'skit night', and have two camp-wide games.

== Programs ==
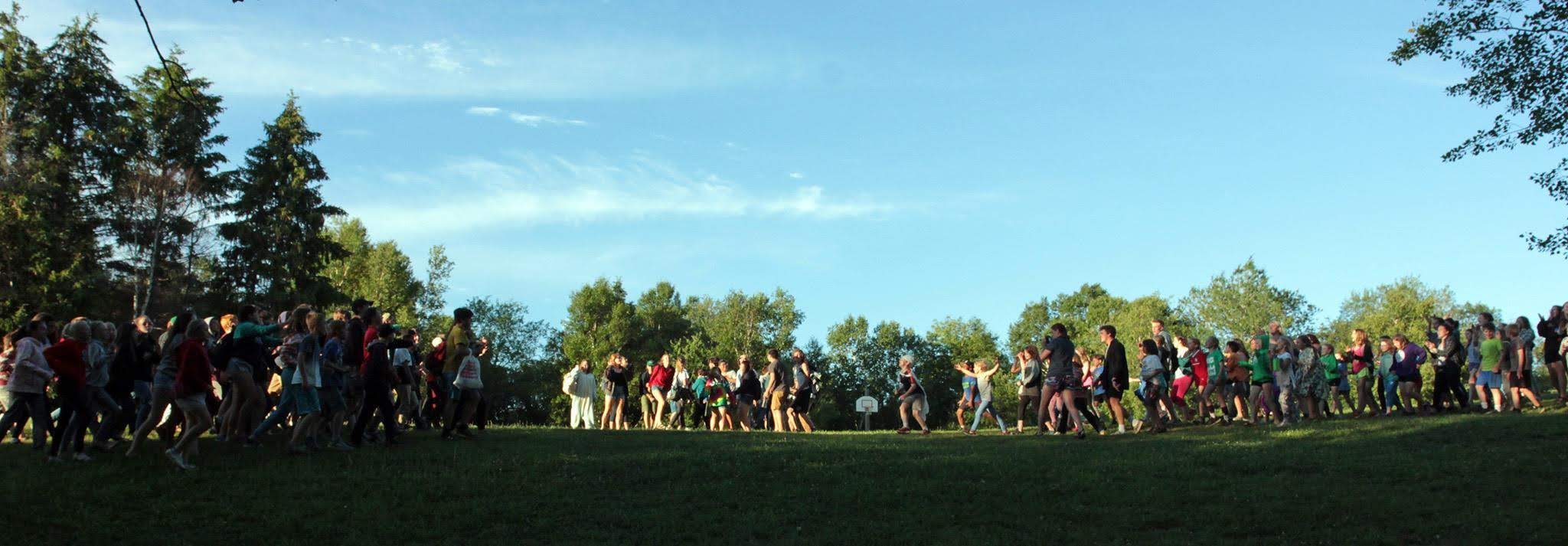

Big Cove YMCA Camp is split into four sections based on age:

=== Little Big Cove ===
Little Big Cove is a three-day (two night) program designed with the intention of getting younger children more accustomed to the idea of a camp lifestyle. It is offered for children ages 6–10 and is popular with first-time campers. Participants do several of the hallmark camp activities Big Cove offers; these include canoeing, swimming, tree-climbing, and many more. Campers wrap up the week by participating in a picnic, where campers walk to a nearby campsite, eat a lunch, and participate in outdoor games. They participate in their own closing campfire; with songs, stories, and snacks.

=== Juniors ===
Big Cove's junior section is a one or two-week program for campers who range from 6-11 in age. Campers participate in: canoeing, archery, Adventures, Arts & Crafts, Swimming and much more. All junior campers participate in a one-night hiking out-trip, where campers set up tents at one of Big Cove's campsites and sleep there overnight; eating a snack, and a breakfast in the woods. At the end of the session, campers go to the closing campfire, where the Keeper of the Cove, a longstanding tradition at Big Cove, gives them a gift from the cove.

=== Seniors ===
The senior section at Big Cove is a program, one or two weeks in length, designed as the next step up from juniors, for ages 12–15. Seniors participate in all camp activities offered and have the added bonus of being able to participate in senior-exclusive programs such as high ropes and hammock village. One week seniors participate in a more advanced one-night ocean canoe trips, while two-week seniors participate in three-night ocean canoe trips. One week campers canoe to one of Big Cove's campsites ranging from a 1-hour paddle to a 4-hour paddle, set up camp, stay overnight, and canoe back in the morning. Two-week campers, on their three-day out-trips, go around Merigomish Harbour, staying at different campsites each night. At the end of their session, campers go to the closing campfire, where the Keeper of the Cove, an old tradition at Big Cove, gives them a gift from the cove.

=== Leadership ===
Big Cove's leadership section is a month-long skills building program, offered for campers aged 15–17. Big Cove's Leadership Section is split into:

==== Leadership One: L1 ====
L1 is an adventure-based program, which focuses on building the hard-skills associated with leadership in a wilderness setting. In their 27 days at Big Cove, L1 campers participate in a ten-day canoe trip from Ballantynes Cove along Nova Scotia's southern coast, up to Cape Breton Island. During the rest of their stay, campers participate in many of the camp activities Big Cove offers to younger campers but also have the opportunity to build their skills through many skill-building programs L1 offers; such as teaching blocks, shadowing, and more. At the end of the month, participants have the opportunity to memorialize their session by creating a plaque, which will be hung at Big Cove's Arts and Crafts Hall.

==== Leadership Two: L2 ====
L2, the post-requisite for L1, is a soft-skill oriented training program. It involves many teaching sessions led by members of the resource team and the L2 Directors. L2 is considered a major component in preparing campers for the transition to counselling. L2 participants have the opportunity to shadow a cabin for one week, in order to build up their comfort in a leadership role. L2s also go on a ten-day paddle around the south-east coast of Prince Edward Island, from the ferry to (Panmure Island)
