= Boat Harbour, Nova Scotia =

Harbour in Nova Scotia, Canada

Coordinates: 45.662674°N 62.651868°W

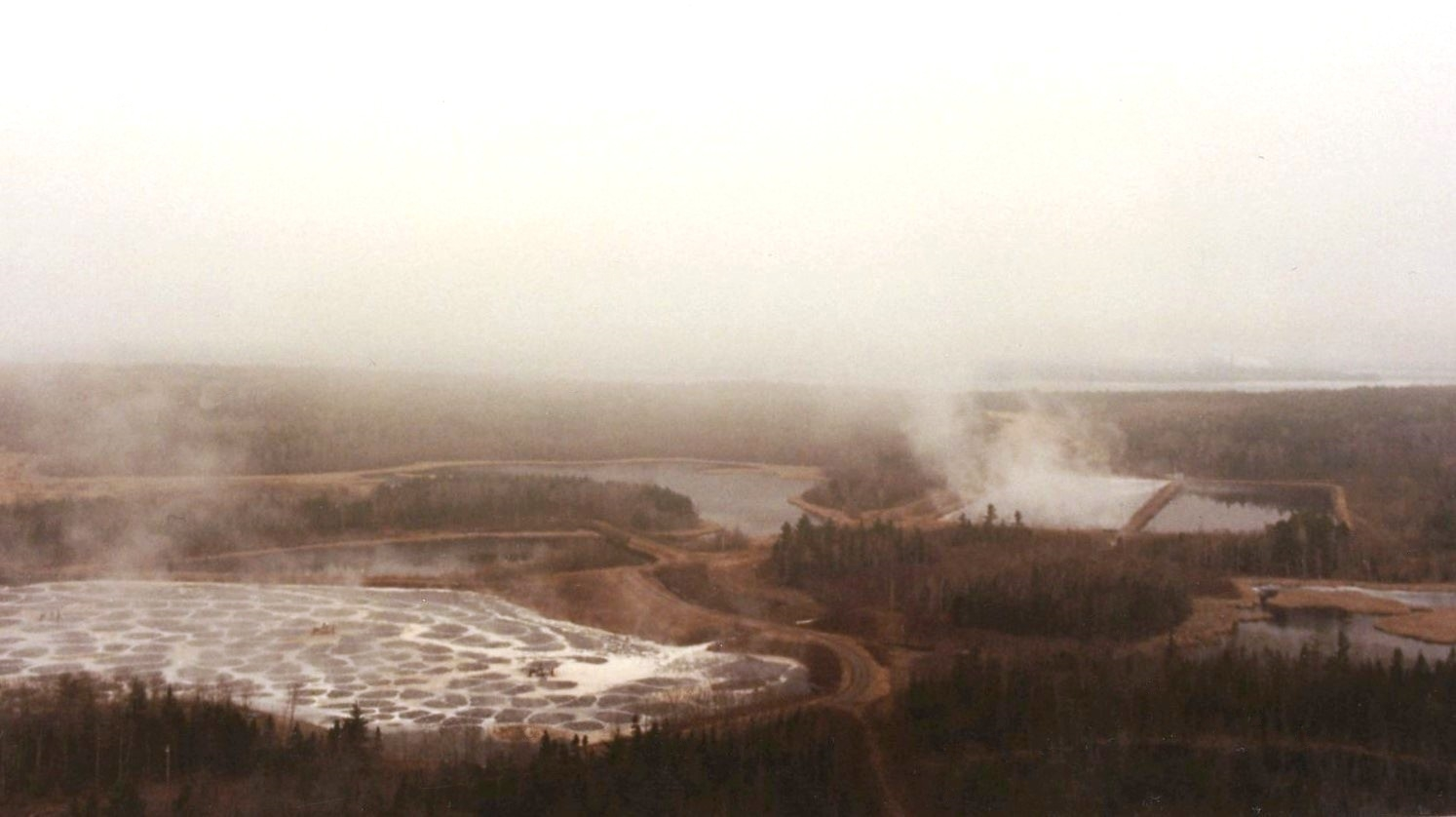
Nova Scotia's Boat Harbour has been used to treat waste from a neighbouring pulp mill since 1967.

A'se'k or Boat Harbour is a body of water on the Northumberland Strait in Pictou County, Nova Scotia. Originally a tidal estuary, construction of a pulp and paper waste effluent treatment facility in the 1960s led to the pollution of the harbour and the source of ongoing environmental concern. Treated water takes about 30 days to reach the Northumberland Strait. Since the treatment system began operation in 1967, Boat Harbour has become polluted with dioxins, furans, chloride, mercury and other toxic heavy metals. It is considered to be one of Nova Scotia's worst cases of environmental racism. In 2015, the Boat Harbour Act wrote into law that the pulp and paper mill cease effluent treatment no later than January 31, 2020; soon after this took effect, the mill closed indefinitely. The Boat Harbour Remediation Project aims to return Boat Harbour to its original state as a tidal estuary. Pilot scale testing has been completed and the project is undergoing a federal environmental assessment and cleanup is expected to begin in 2021.

Boat Harbour is fed by several freshwater streams from spruce woodlands. Known as A'se'k ([ɑːseːk]) in the Mi'kmaq language, it was historically used by First Nations people for fishing, clam digging, hunting and recreation, as well as a harbour for boats used to fish in the Northumberland Strait. Pictou Landing First Nation have their main reserve, Fisher's Grant 24, adjacent to Boat Harbour, and two other unpopulated reserves nearby.

== Effluent treatment facility ==
In the 1960s a kraft pulp mill was constructed by Scott Paper Company at Abercrombie Point, 4 km (2.5 mi) to the west. Keen to promote economic growth, the provincial government led by Robert L. Stanfield agreed to take responsibility for effluent leaving the mill for a period of 30 years, and turned Boat Harbour into a settling pond by constructing a dam across its mouth. In 1967, Pictou Landing First Nation were compensated $65,000 for future use of the harbour. A pipeline was dug that carries pulp mill waste from the mill site at Abercrombie Point, under the East River, to the treatment facility at Pictou Landing. Within days of the mill's operation, aquatic life began dying and the water level rose by 2–3 m (6.6–9.8 ft), flooding 12 ha (30 acres) of reserve lands. In 1971 two settling ponds and an aerated stabilisation basin were constructed where the effluent entered the lagoon. In 1975, a pipeline replaced the ditch that effluent flowed through before entering the system.

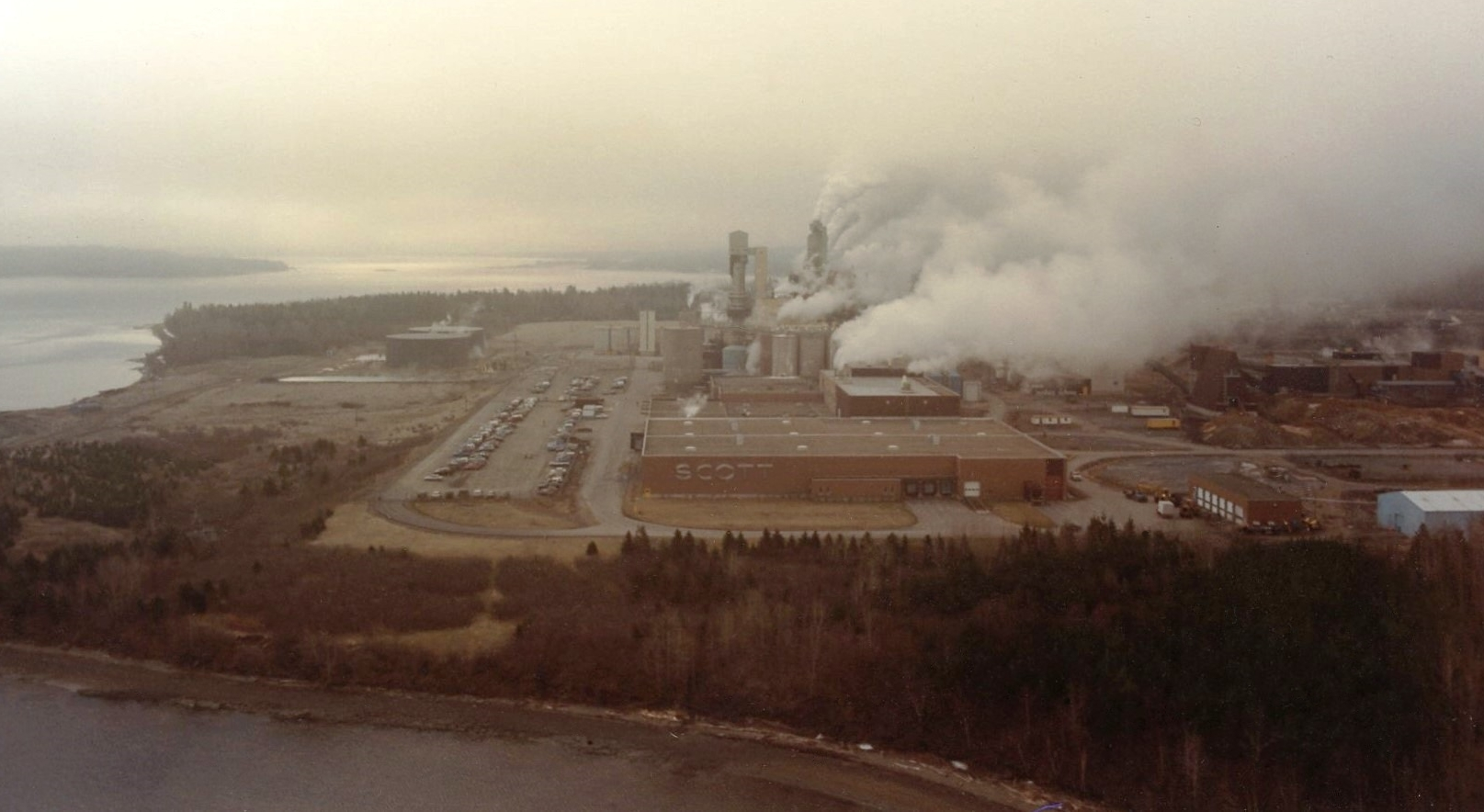
Scott Paper pulp mill, ca 1990

Canso Chemicals, a chlor-alkali facility situated on the mill property from 1971 to 1992, also used Boat Harbour to dispose of its effluent. It produced chlorine, caustic soda, and hydrogen for use at the mill. During the 1970s the plant was unaccountably losing several tons of mercury each year, with a peak loss of five tons in 1975. This loss has never been resolved, leading to concerns that it may have found its way into Boat Harbour.

Settled material from the facility is normally dredged and buried off-site, but some has been dried and burned in the mill's power boiler under 'test permits'.

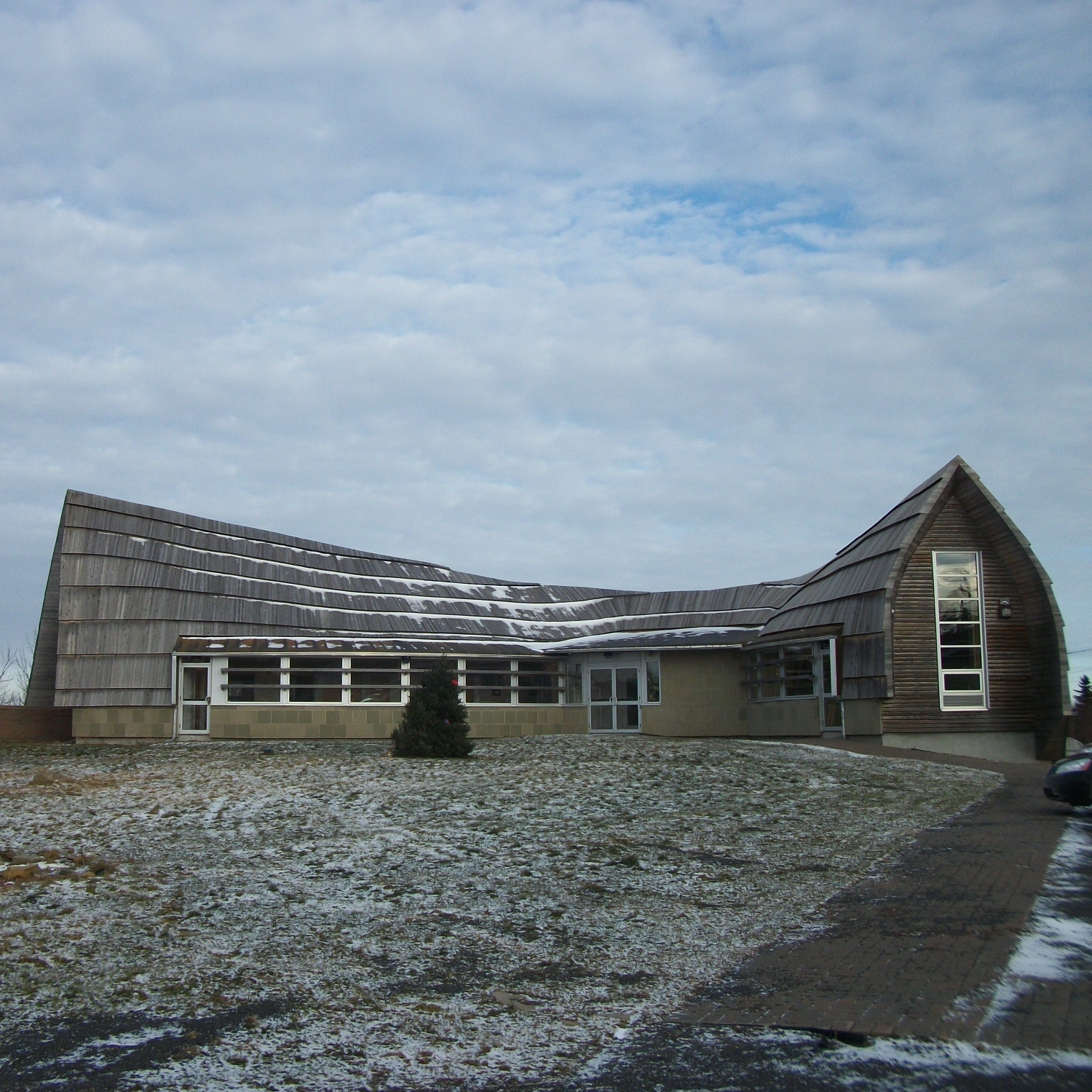
Health Centre in nearby Pictou Landing First Nation

In 1977 the Pictou Landing Band began considering legal options, but it wasn't until 1986 that they filed against the federal government, their position strengthened by the 1984 case of R v Guerin in which the Supreme Court of Canada confirmed the government's fiduciary duty to status Indians. In 1993 the federal government settled out of court for $35 million, some of which was paid to individual band members and some to a trust fund for future use. In 1995 the provincial government agreed to extend its contract with the mill to handle the effluent, and in return to hand over nearby Crown lands to the band. It also agreed to close the facility in 2005 and return the harbour to its natural condition.

In 1997, the mill was taken over by Kimberly-Clark and in 2003 they agreed with the Band to extend treatment beyond the 2005 deadline, by piping effluent directly from the aerated settling pond to the Northumberland Strait where it would be released on the ebb tide, and to return Boat Harbour to a tidal state. However, the mill was purchased in 2004 by Neenah Paper who were not inclined to spend capital on water treatment, and following concerns from the Department of Fisheries and Oceans over the environmental consequences of the pipeline, that plan was cancelled in 2005. In 2008, the province decided to extend the discharge license on a month-by-month basis. The following month the mill was purchased by Northern Pulp, a subsidiary of Asia Pulp and Paper, an arm of the Indonesian conglomerate Sinar Mas. The Progressive Conservative government of the time agreed to close Boat Harbour and build a new facility, but when the New Democrats came to power in 2009 negotiations ceased. Following that government's decision to provide $90 million assistance to the mill to purchase woodland and improve air treatment systems but do nothing about Boat Harbour, the First Nation filed an action in the Nova Scotia Supreme Court.

On June 10, 2014, the pipeline carrying effluent from the mill to the treatment facility ruptured, causing 47,000,000 L (12,000,000 US gal) of effluent to spill into a wetland and thence to the East River and Pictou Harbour. In March 2016, Northern Pulp were charged under the Fisheries Act and fined $225,000 which was to be distributed equally to three conservation organizations. Following protests by the First Nation over the spill, the Provincial Government passed the Boat Harbour Act, 2015 detailing that effluent treatment in Boat Harbour must cease no later than January 31, 2020, providing the mill five years to determine an alternative effluent handling system.

A pilot project was undertaken in 2017 to test options for handling the remediation project to restore the harbour to a tidal estuary at an estimated cost of $133 million. In 2019, the remediation project cost was reevaluated at $217 million and is expected to begin in 2021 and take at least five years to complete. The plan included dredging up to 1,000,000 cubic metres (35,000,000 cu ft) of contaminated sediment and pipe it to a pad where water will be removed for treatment and up to 500,000 cubic metres (18,000,000 cu ft) of solids will be moved to an existing and expanded containment cell on site.

In January 2019, Northern Pulp asked for a one-year extension on the January 31, 2020 deadline. In December 2019, the request for extension was refused by Premier Stephen McNeil; the mill soon after announced that it would be closing. Northern Pulp was permitted to continue to use the Boat Harbour wastewater treatment plant until the end of April 2020 as it prepared the facility for indefinite closure. As a result of the closure, 300 jobs at the mill were lost.
