= HMS Beacon =

Five ships of the Royal Navy have been named HMS Beacon:

- HMS Beacon (1804), a fireship, previously the mercantile Duff purchased in 1804 and sold in 1808.
- HMS Beacon (1832), a Hecla-class bomb vessel launched in 1823 as HMS Meteor. She became a survey ship in 1832 and was renamed HMS Beacon. She was sold in 1846.
- HMS Beacon (1855), a bomb vessel launched in 1855 and renamed MV.16 later that year. She was reclassified as a dockyard lighter in 1862.
- HMS Beacon (1856), an Albacore-class gunboat launched in 1856 and broken up in 1864.
- HMS Beacon (1867), a Beacon-class gunvessel launched in 1867 and sold in 1888.

== See also ==
- Beacon (disambiguation)
- USS Beacon (PG-88), planned as Beacon, assigned to the UK but reassigned to the US Navy in 1943. Later reassigned again to the Royal Navy and commissioned as HMS Dittany
