= Clark Island (Washington) =

Island in Washington state, United States

Clark Island Marine State Park
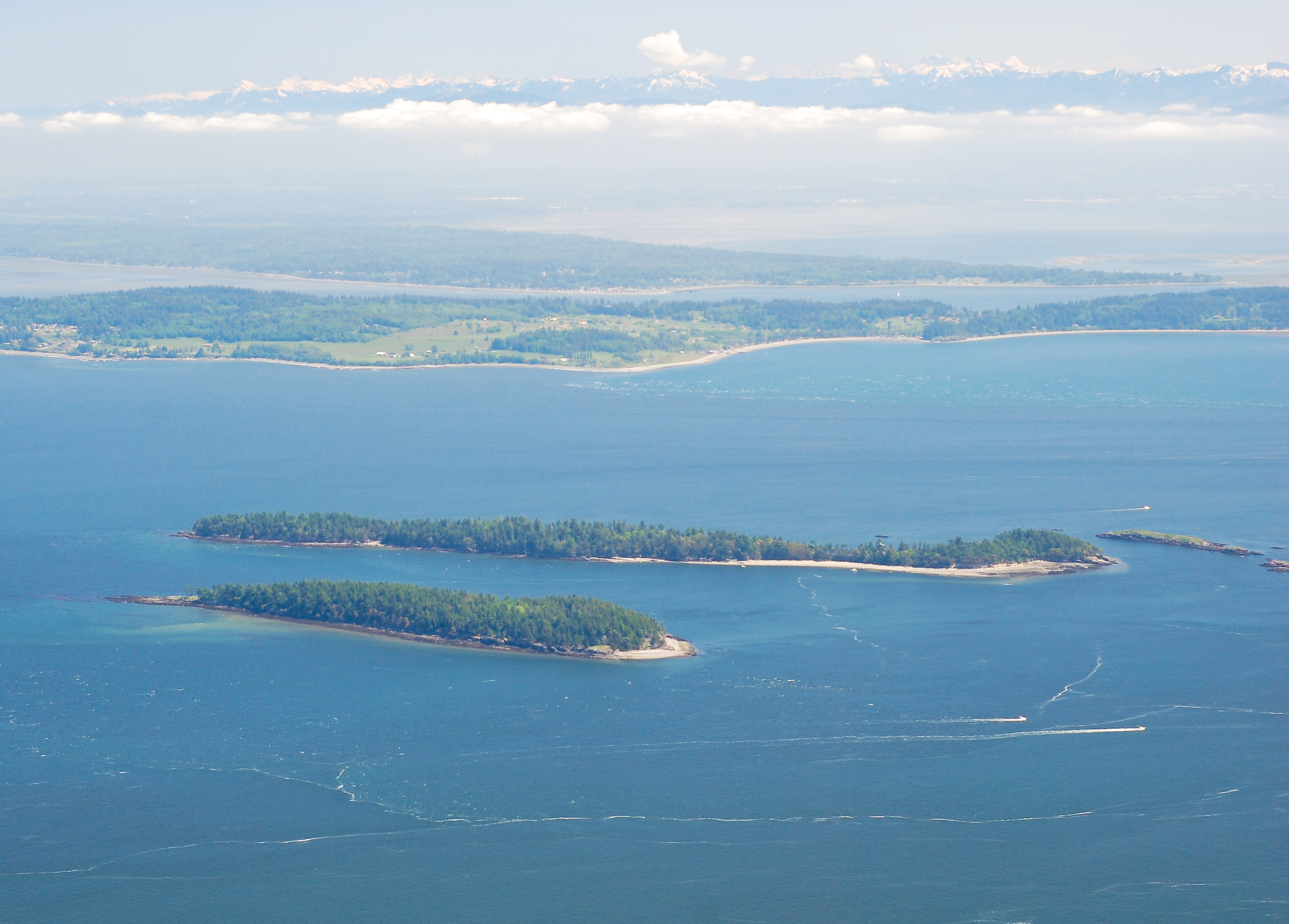
- Clark Island (right) and Barnes Island (left) viewed from Mount Constitution

- Location within Washington (state) Location within the United States
- Location: San Juan County, Washington, United States
- Coordinates: 48°42′05″N 122°45′51″W
- Area: 55.05 acres (22.28 ha)
- Elevation: 95 ft (29 m)
- Established: 1964
- Administrator: Washington State Parks and Recreation Commission
- Website: Official website

Clark Island is an island in the San Juan Islands of the Pacific Northwest, located near Barnes Island off the northeast coast of Orcas Island. It is part of the U.S. state of Washington. Clark Island Marine State Park, which encompasses the entire 55-acre (22 ha) island, has two picnicking sites, 15 primitive campsites, and nine mooring buoys.

== History ==
The name was given by Charles Wilkes during the Wilkes Expedition of 1838-1842, in honor of John Clark, a midshipman who was killed during the Battle of Lake Erie of the War of 1812. The island, along with nearby Barnes Island, had been named Islas de Aquays in 1792, by the Spanish explorer Francisco de Eliza, in honor of Eliza's patron, the Viceroy of Mexico, Juan Vicente de Güemes Padilla Horcasitas y Aguayo, 2nd Count of Revillagigedo. Washington State Parks acquired the island from the Bureau of Land Management in 1964 for $137.63 (equivalent to $1,429 in 2025).
