= Beacon Status =

Progressive educational initiative

Beacon Status was a progressive educational initiative that the United Kingdom implemented based on the idea that organizational learning could be advanced through a competitive process of identifying successful organizations and recruiting them to disseminate their good practices. The beacon status initiative was launched by the Department for Education and Skills (DfES) in partnership with the Learning and Skills Council (LSC) in 1998 and ran through to August 2005 for primary and secondary schools in England and Wales. Beacon Status was for providers funded by the Learning and Skills Council, which are mainly Further Education colleges. The Learning and Skills Improvement Service was still awarding Beacon Status in 2011.

The initiative was discontinued due to uncertainty as to whether or not the initiative actually improved Beacon schools. The award congratulated learning providers that deliver outstanding teaching and learning and were well led and managed; schools were funded to enable them to build partnerships with each other and to share effective practice with other schools. For instance, an excellently performing school might have been 'twinned' with another school defined as failing, or in special measures, in order to improve that school's performance.

The Office for Standards in Education (OFSTED) and the Adult Learning Inspectorate (ALI) were responsible for inspection and making sure the schools maintain their level of excellence and disseminating their practices. The status had to be renewed every three years. This scheme has been replaced by the specialist schools programme for secondary schools, which includes new initiatives such as the Leading Edge Partnership programme. At primary school level, Primary Strategy Learning Networks (PSLNs) are being created to encourage co-operation between schools.

== Background ==
In 1998, 74 primary, secondary, nursery and special schools were selected by the Department for Education and Employment for their educational expertise in the areas of management or curriculum with the strategic aim that these institutions were to be 'held up as beacons of excellence' for other schools to emulate. These schools were expected to maintain their level of perceived excellence whilst, at the same time, attempting to assist others in their development. The programme was part of the UK government's focus on school improvement through diversity, collaboration and partnership. The purpose of these schools was to recognize a cross section of educational best practice and spread it to other schools. All potential Beacon Schools were requested to complete a short, focused questionnaire and, based on analysis of this survey, the Department for Education and Employment created a method to addresses the management implications of balancing the existing core function of educating pupils whilst developing support and training facilities for other educational professionals. Findings indicate that effective communication, both internally and externally, coupled with a clear sense of purpose and vision, have enabled schools that qualify as a Beacon school to fulfil both roles.

After successfully isolating qualities that schools can embody to both educate students and develop teachers, the initiative went beyond the pilot stage and expanded further when 125 more schools joined in September 1999. The number of Beacon Schools in operation more than doubled in September 2000 when 300 more schools took on Beacon status. But, the largest expansion was in September 2001 when a further 425 schools became part of the initiative. The number of Beacon Schools reached a peak of around 1150 by September 2002, and this level of involvement was maintained into 2003. In 2004, Beacon evaluation and funding to Beacon schools was discontinued due to uncertainty with whether the initiative actually improved schools. Beacon activity is now decided on a local level, however the principle of schools working together, collaborating to share good practice, remains strong.

== Methodology of evaluation ==
Beacon schools are evaluated based on certain criteria developed to accurately assess the efficiency of student and teacher development. The evaluation is based on a questionnaire consisting of closed questions plus an open-ended question encouraging the respondent to provide more detail about their school's Beacon activities. Data from the closed questions was analysed to produce frequencies of data. The responses to the open question were coded, and the data was analysed using the following main themes:

- Benefits for schools
- Issues and challenges
- Partnership working
- Thoughts about the future

== Distinguishing factors ==
Though the United Kingdom's public sector had implemented many educational reform initiatives in the past, the beacon status initiative was the first of its kind. The initiative is distinguishable from other educational reform initiatives in two important respects. Firstly the beacon status initiative was funded and operated by, the government rather than non-government organizations. The UK government was responsible for the formation and discontinuation of the beacon status award and the funding associated with it. Second, while all award schemes presume, at least tacitly, that the identification of the best and brightest will contribute to learning and improvement, the beacon model gives award winners a formal responsibility to disseminate their practices.

== See also ==
- AoC Beacon Awards
- Beacon high schools in Beijing
