= Hartridge Hill =

Peat hill in East Devon, England

Coordinates: 50°50′47″N 3°10′01″W

Hartridge Hill is an elongated, peat hill situated in the Luppitt catchment area of East Devon, England. Mostly privately owned and primarily used for farming this is, with a peak rising 261 metres (856 ft) asl, one of the highest spots in the Otter Valley.

At its highest and most southerly point there is a tumulus or burial mound, which is an archaeological site of interest.

At its most southerly point lies the hamlet of Beacon.
