= Rotating beacon =

Rotating beacon may refer to:

- Aerobeacon, a light assembly creating a fixed or flashing signal visible over long distances
- Aerodrome beacon, a beacon to indicate an airport's or aerodrome's location to aircraft pilots at night
- Airway beacon, a rotating light mounted atop a tower
- Emergency vehicle lighting, visual warning light fitted to a vehicle
- Lighthouse, a structure that emits light to aid marine navigation

== See also ==
- Beacon (disambiguation)
