= Roma Islands =

Uninhabited island in Texas, United States

Roma Island
- Interactive map of Roma Island
- Etymology: Roma, Texas

Geography
- Location: Rio Grande
- Coordinates: 26°24′27″N 99°01′23″W

Administration
- United States
- State: Texas
- County: Starr County

The Roma Islands are two uninhabited island in the Rio Grande located between Starr County, Texas and Ciudad Miguel Alemán, Tamaulipas, Mexico.

== History ==
Due to the islands location on the Mexico-United States border, it has switched governance numerous times. The Boundary Treaty of 1970 saw the island move to Mexican control.

In March 2025, Texas Land Commissioner Dawn Buckingham, requested that the islands, along with the nearby Beaver Island, be transferred back to the United States, due to ongoing drug cartel activity on the island.
