= Fisher's Grant 24G =

Mi'kmaq reserve in Nova Scotia, Canada

Coordinates: 45°39′19.18″N 62°38′45.97″W

Fisher's Grant 24g in Nova Scotia

Fisher's Grant 24G is a Mi'kmaq reserve located in Pictou County, Nova Scotia.

It is administratively part of the Pictou Landing First Nation.
