= Pictou County pizza =

Nova Scotian pizza variant

Pictou County pizza is a regional variant of pizza found in Pictou County, Nova Scotia. The pizza utilizes a "brown sauce" that includes common pizza sauce-related ingredients such as tomatoes, onions and oregano as well as less common sauce ingredients like flour and chicken broth. It also uses Halifax-made Brothers pepperoni,, a product of Nova Scotia.

The pizza can be shipped frozen across Canada via an arrangement between a local pizza shop and the local UPS agency. The most common destination is Fort McMurray, Alberta, with a two-day delivery time. Since 2014, an annual competition between pizza makers in Pictou County has been held, with awards being given under a People's Choice category and selected by a panel of judges. In early 2018, it was announced that Pictou County pizza will be made available in the Halifax area through delivery from a location in Truro for a $10 delivery fee, with the first delivery on February 10, 2018.
