= USS Beacon =

USS Beacon may refer to the following ships of the United States Navy:

- USS Beacon (PG-88) was a Flower-class corvette built in Canada initially for the US but which served in the Royal Navy as HMS Dittany
- USS Beacon (PG-99) was an Asheville-class gunboat during the Vietnam War
