= Merigomish Harbour 31 =

Mi'kmaq reserve in Nova Scotia, Canada

Coordinates: 45.626°N 62.484°W

Location of Merigomish Harbour 31 in Nova Scotia

Merigomish Harbour 31 is a Mi'kmaq reserve located in Pictou County, Nova Scotia.

It is administratively part of the Pictou Landing First Nation.
