= Big Island (Wood County, Wisconsin) =

River island in Wood County, Wisconsin

Coordinates: 44°24′56″N 89°48′27″W

Big Island is a river island in Wood County, Wisconsin. The island is in the Wisconsin River near Wisconsin Rapids.

Big Island was so named on account of its size, being the 5th largest island in the Wisconsin River; it is 0.46 square miles (1.2 km^{2}).

Big Island is known for having a lot of clams and having very muddy beaches.
