= Beaver Island, Nova Scotia =

Canadian island

Coordinates: 44°49′29.2″N 62°20′16″W

Beaver Island in Nova Scotia

Beaver Island is an island community of the Halifax Regional Municipality in the Canadian province of Nova Scotia. The weather station code is CWBV; due to its exposed location, Beaver Island can receive very powerful winds, especially from offshore. Since 1846 there has been a lighthouse on the island.

== Climate ==
Climate data for Beaver Island
Month	Jan	Feb	Mar	Apr	May	Jun	Jul	Aug	Sep	Oct	Nov	Dec	Year
Mean daily maximum °C (°F)	0.7 (33.3)	−0.1 (31.8)	2.0 (35.6)	5.4 (41.7)	9.2 (48.6)	13.5 (56.3)	17.5 (63.5)	19.6 (67.3)	18.0 (64.4)	13.4 (56.1)	8.4 (47.1)	4.0 (39.2)	9.3 (48.7)
Mean daily minimum °C (°F)	−6.2 (20.8)	−6.4 (20.5)	−3.4 (25.9)	0.7 (33.3)	4.5 (40.1)	8.7 (47.7)	12.9 (55.2)	14.8 (58.6)	12.9 (55.2)	8.3 (46.9)	3.2 (37.8)	−2.1 (28.2)	4.0 (39.2)
Source: https://climate.weather.gc.ca/climate_normals/results_1991_2020_e.html?searchType=stnProv&lstProvince=NS&txtCentralLatMin=0&txtCentralLatSec=0&txtCentralLongMin=0&txtCentralLongSec=0&climate_id=8200558&dispBack=0
