= Beacon School (Stamford, Connecticut) =

School in Connecticut

The Beacon School

Location
- 111 West North Street; Stamford, Connecticut 06902; United States

Information
- Motto: Latin: Lux Tua Inveniatur (Find Your Own Light)
- Established: 2009; 16 years ago
- Sister school: The Spire School, The Pinnacle School, Links Academy
- Head of school: John Manganiello
- Staff: 20
- Faculty: 15
- Grades: 3–12
- Gender: Co-ed
- Color: Blue
- Mascot: Eagle Owl
- Affiliations: The New England Association of Schools and Colleges (NEASC)

The Beacon School was an independent preparatory day school for students in grades 3–12, owned and operated by Greenwich Education Group (GEG). It was located in Stamford, Connecticut's historic Hubbard Heights neighborhood. The GEG announced it would close the school "in an effort to consolidate their academic programs".

== See also ==
- Beacon English School
