= Graham Fraser (industrialist) =

Canadian steel mogul

Mayor of New Glasgow
- In office 1910–1915

Personal details
- Born: August 12, 1846 New Glasgow, Nova Scotia
- Died: December 25, 1915 (aged 69) New Glasgow, Nova Scotia
- Profession: Industrialist

Graham Fraser (August 12, 1846 – December 25, 1915) was a Canadian industrialist.

== Career ==
With George Forrest McKay, he founded Hope Iron Works, a company specialized in ironing ships. The company changed name to the Nova Scotia Forge Company thereafter. With the decline of the wooden shipbuilding industry, the company diversified to also create other pieces of metal.

Fraser took advantage of John A. Macdonald's national policy, and created the Nova Scotia Steel Company to manufacture raw steel, which was needed for the construction of the Canadian Pacific Railway and the development of industries in Canada. The production of steel ingots by the "Scotia" as the company was colloquially called, began in 1883.

In 1897, internal disputes in the "Scotia" caused Fraser to leave the company to lead the Dominion Iron and Steel Company, the chief competitor of Scotia. He retired in 1905, and returned to New Glasgow to live the rest of his days.

== New Glasgow ==
Fraser served various offices in New Glasgow throughout his life, as town councillor, water commissioner, and director of the Aberdeen Hospital. He was elected mayor of New Glasgow in 1910, a position he held until his death in 1915.

== Legacy ==
In the 1960s, a cairn showing Fraser and McKay was unveiled in Trenton, Nova Scotia by then Premier Robert Stanfield to honor these "pioneers of the Canadian steel industry".
