= Boat Harbour West 37 =

Mi'kmaq reserve in Nova Scotia, Canada

Coordinates: 45°38′35.98″N 62°39′59.51″W

Boat Harbour West 37 in Nova Scotia

Boat Harbour West 37 is a Mi'kmaq reserve located in Pictou County, Nova Scotia.

It was created between 1962 and 1963, and its 98.2 ha are used solely by the Pictou Landing First Nation.
