= Windy Lake =

Windy Lake may refer to one of eight lakes of that name in Ontario, Canada:

- Windy Lake in Algoma District, NTS Map sheet 041J10
- Windy Lake in Parry Sound District, NTS Map sheet 041H16
- In Sudbury District:
  - Windy Lake, NTS Map sheet 041I10
  - Windy Lake, NTS Map sheet 041I11
  - Windy Lake, NTS Map sheet 041O09
- In Thunder Bay District:
  - Windy Lake, NTS Map sheet 052B01
  - Windy Lake, NTS Map sheet 052G01
- Windy Lake in Timiskaming District, NTS Map sheet 031M04
