= Beacon Council (award) =

A Beacon Council is a local authority in England which has been recognised for its excellence and innovation. The scheme attempts to disseminate best practice in local government. Beacon Councils are given greater autonomy from central government. The word beaconicity, describing the attributes of a Beacon Council, was among the 200 terms condemned by the Local Government Association in 2009.
