= Big Island (Woodhull Lake) =

- Location within New York

Geography
- Location: Otsego Lake
- Coordinates: 43°35′54″N 74°58′23″W
- Highest elevation: 1,995 ft (608.1 m)

Administration
- United States
- State: New York
- County: Herkimer
- Town: Webb

Big Island is an island on Woodhull Lake in Herkimer County, New York.
