= Beacon, Devon =

Beacon
- Hamlet
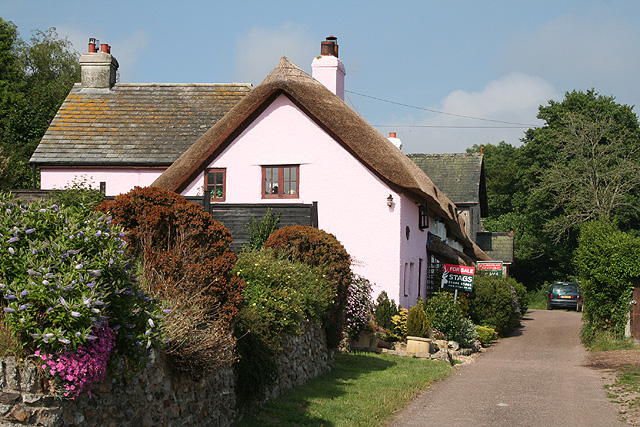
- Cottages at Beacon

- Location within Devon
- Coordinates: 50°50′23.42″N 3°9′58.44″W
- Sovereign state: United Kingdom
- Country: England
- County: Devon

Area
  - Total: 0.039 sq mi (0.1 km^{2})
- Elevation: 636 ft (194 m)

Beacon is a hamlet near Honiton in the English county of Devon, below the most southerly point of Hartridge Hill in Luppitt parish.
