= Big Island, Nova Scotia =

Coordinates: 45.6625°N 62.4253°W

Big Island, Nova Scotia is a peninsula located in Pictou County, Nova Scotia. Prospector Robert Henderson of Big Island brought the first gold out of the Klondike in 1896, leading indirectly to the Klondike Gold Rush.
