= The Beacon, Hemel Hempstead =

Proposed building in Hemel Hempstead, Hertfordshire, England

Coordinates: 51.740°N 0.476°W

The Beacon

The Beacon is a 17-storey block of 272 flats planned to be built in Hemel Hempstead, Hertfordshire, England.

The developer Lumiere Developments claims that it will be the "world's most sustainable development". They claim that it will be carbon neutral, as it will generate all the energy it needs, and residents will never have to any energy bills. It will incorporate the UK's densest solar farm.

In July 2018, the project was listed for sale by the receivers "after the debt held against it was called in by its bridge lender". It was due to have been completed in 2018. The "freehold development opportunity" is listed for sale at £8.5 million.
