= Beacon (Scheer) =

Art installation in Brooklyn, New York, U.S.

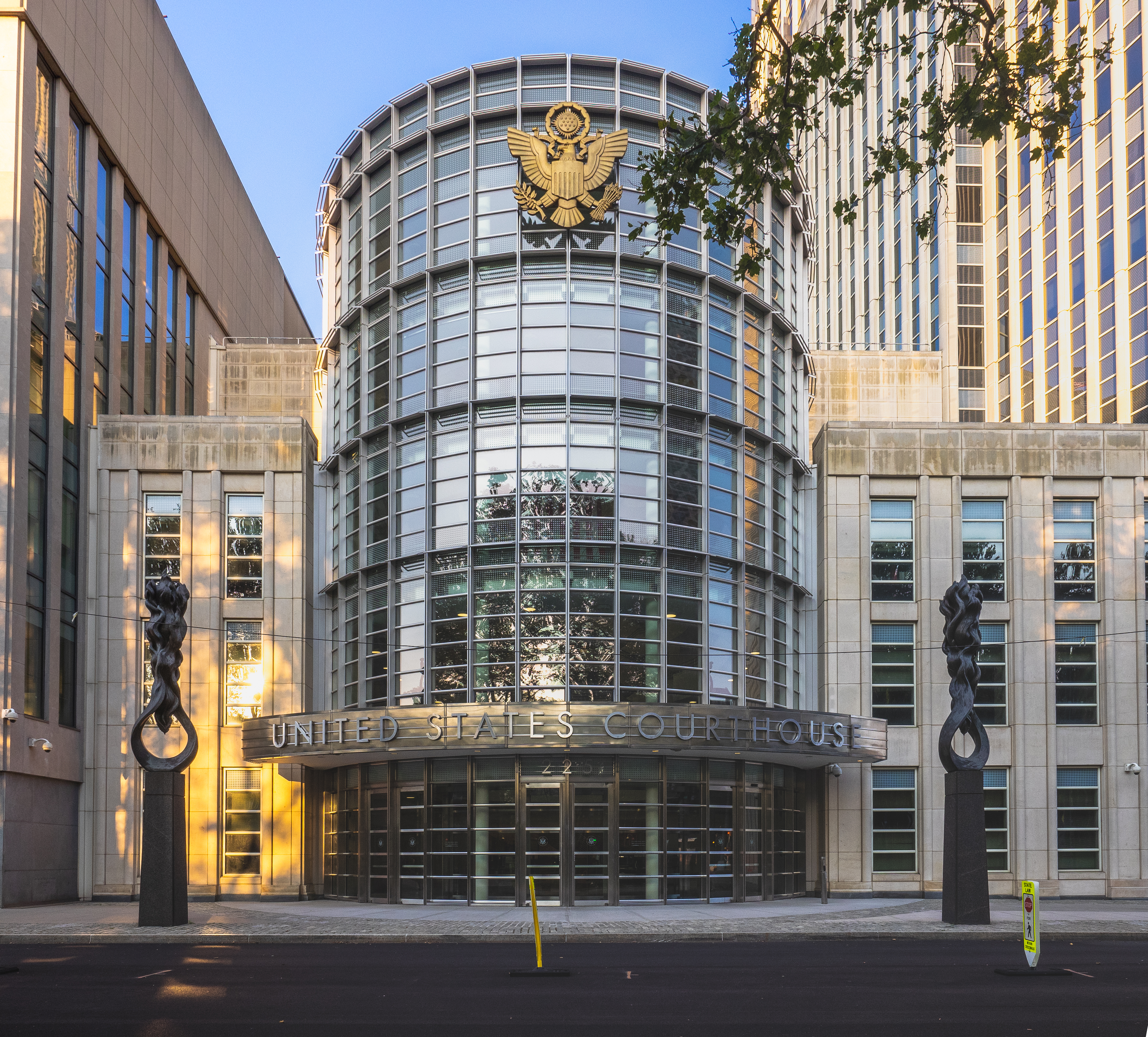
- The sculptures in 2019
- Artist: Lisa Scheer
- Medium: Bronze sculpture
- Location: New York City, New York, U.S.
- 40°41′49.4″N 73°59′23.6″W

Beacon is an art installation with twin cast-bronze sculptures by Lisa Scheer, installed outside Brooklyn's Theodore Roosevelt United States Courthouse, in the U.S. state of New York.
