= Buck Island =

Buck Island may refer to:

- Buck Island Reef National Monument near Saint Croix, U.S. Virgin Islands
- Buck Island National Wildlife Refuge near Saint Thomas, U.S. Virgin Islands
- Buck Island (British Virgin Islands)
- Buck Island (Oregon) in Upper Klamath Lake, Oregon
- Buck Island (Washington), one of the San Juan Islands, Washington
- Buck Island, County Fermanagh, a townland in Belleek, County Fermanagh, Northern Ireland
