= Pictou County =

County in Nova Scotia

Pictou County Gaelic: Siorramachd Phiogto
- County
- Flag Seal
- Nickname: "PC"
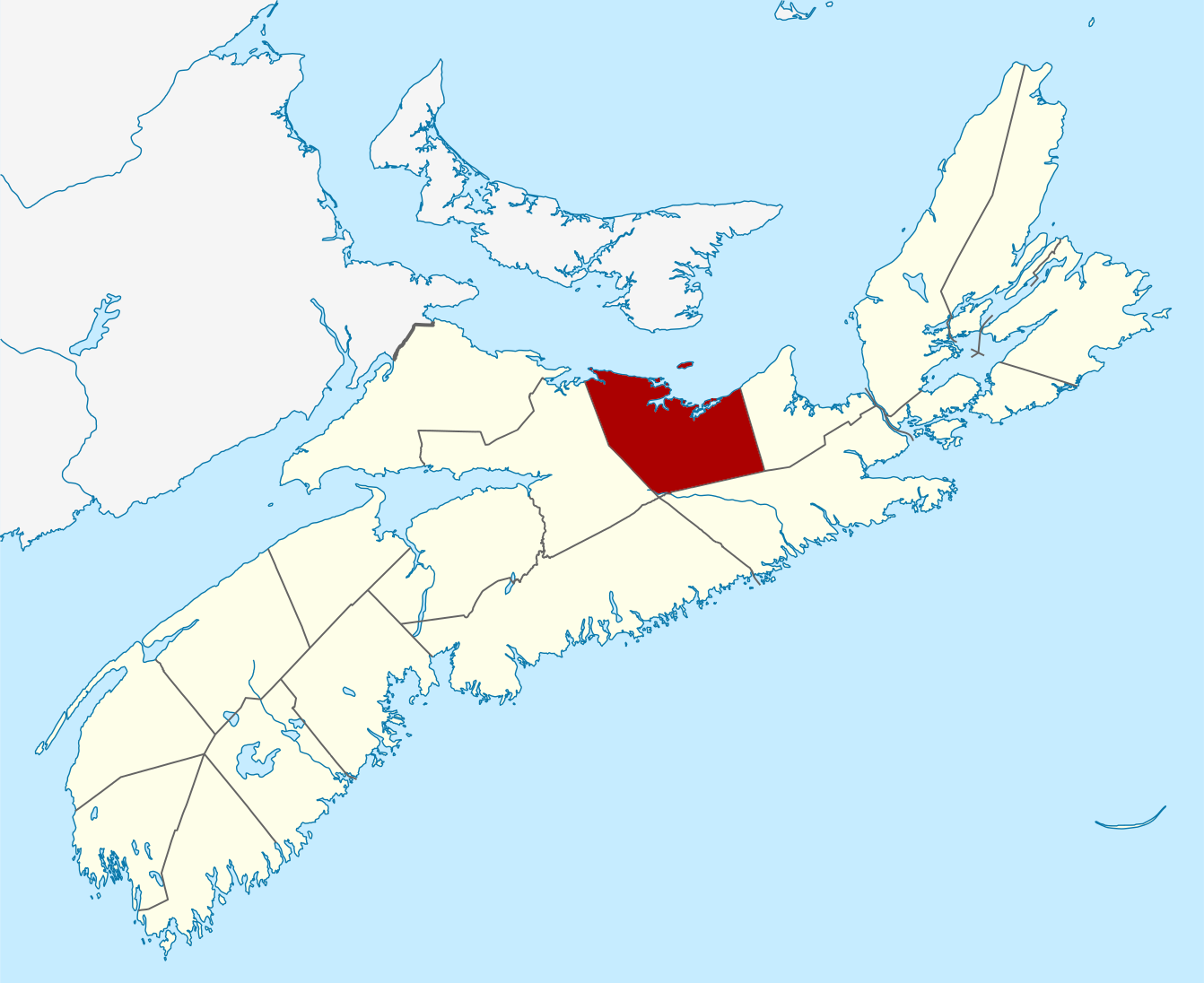
- Location of Pictou County, Nova Scotia
- Interactive map of Pictou County
- Coordinates: 45.5°N 62.6°W
- Country: Canada
- Province: Nova Scotia
- Towns: New Glasgow / Pictou / Stellarton / Trenton / Westville
- Established: 1835
- Incorporated: April 17, 1879
- Electoral Districts Federal: Central Nova
- Provincial: Pictou Centre / Pictou East / Pictou West

Government
  - Type: Five town councils and one rural municipality

Area
  - Land: 2,844.10 km^{2} (1,098.11 sq mi)

Population (2021)
  - Total: 43,657
  - Density: 15.4/km^{2} (40/sq mi)
  - Change 2011-16: ▼0.2%
- Time zone: UTC−4 (AST)
  - Summer (DST): UTC−3 (ADT)
- Area codes: 902, 782
- Dwellings: 22,525
- Median Earnings*: $43,475 CDN
- Website: munpict.ca
- Median household income, 2005 (all households)

Pictou County is a county in the province of Nova Scotia, Canada. It was established in 1835, and was formerly a part of Halifax County from 1759 to 1835. It had a population of 43,657 people in 2021, a decline of 0.2 percent from 2016. Furthermore, its 2016 population is only 88.11% of the census population in 1991. It is the sixth most populous county in Nova Scotia.

== Etymology ==
The origin of the name "Pictou" is obscure. Possible Mi'kmaq derivations include "Piktook" meaning an explosion of gas, and "Bucto" meaning fire, possibly related to the coal fields in the area. It might also be a corruption of Poictou (Poitou), a former province of France. Nicolas Denys named the harbour La rivière de Pictou in the 1660s.

== History ==
The area of the modern Pictou County was a part of the Miꞌkmaq nation of Mi'kma'ki (mi'gama'gi) at the time of European contact.

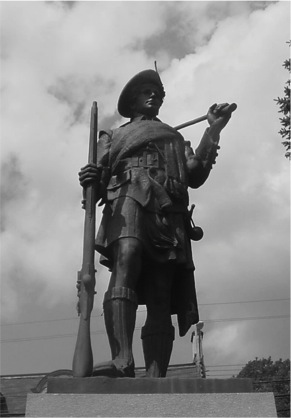
Hector Pioneer by renowned sculptor John Wilson, Pictou, Nova Scotia

In the early 1600s France claimed the area as a part of Acadia. By the 1760s, small French settlements existed along the coast in the eastern part of the county near the mouth of the French River. The largest of these was on the Big Island at Merigomish. By the conclusion of the French and Indian War in 1763, and the Expulsion of the Acadians, these had been abandoned.

Pictou came under the control of Britain in 1763 after the French and Indian War. In 1765 the first British land grants were issued, including a grant to the Philadelphia Company. A number of families from that company left Philadelphia aboard the Hope in May 1767, and arrived at Pictou Harbour in June. In 1770 there were 120 settlers living in Pictou, of whom 93 were American, 18 were Irish, five were Acadian, and two each were Scottish and English.

Pictou was a receiving point for many Scottish immigrants moving to a new home in northern Nova Scotia and Cape Breton Island following the Highland Clearances of the late 18th and early 19th centuries. Consequently, the town's slogan is "The Birthplace of New Scotland"; the first wave of immigrants from Scotland is acknowledged to have arrived on September 15, 1773, on the Hector.

Coal was first discovered in Pictou County in 1798. A number of different individuals and companies were involved in the nascent coal industry; however, in 1825 the majority of mining rights in Nova Scotia was obtained by the General Mining Association. After surveying mines in Nova Scotia, they chose to start at the East River of Pictou and in the summer of 1827 they began operations there. By the end of the year the first steam engine in Nova Scotia was operating at Albion Mines.

In 1839 the first locomotive in Canada to run on iron rails, the Samson, was put into service at Albion Mines. It is the oldest surviving locomotive in Canada.

== Geography ==
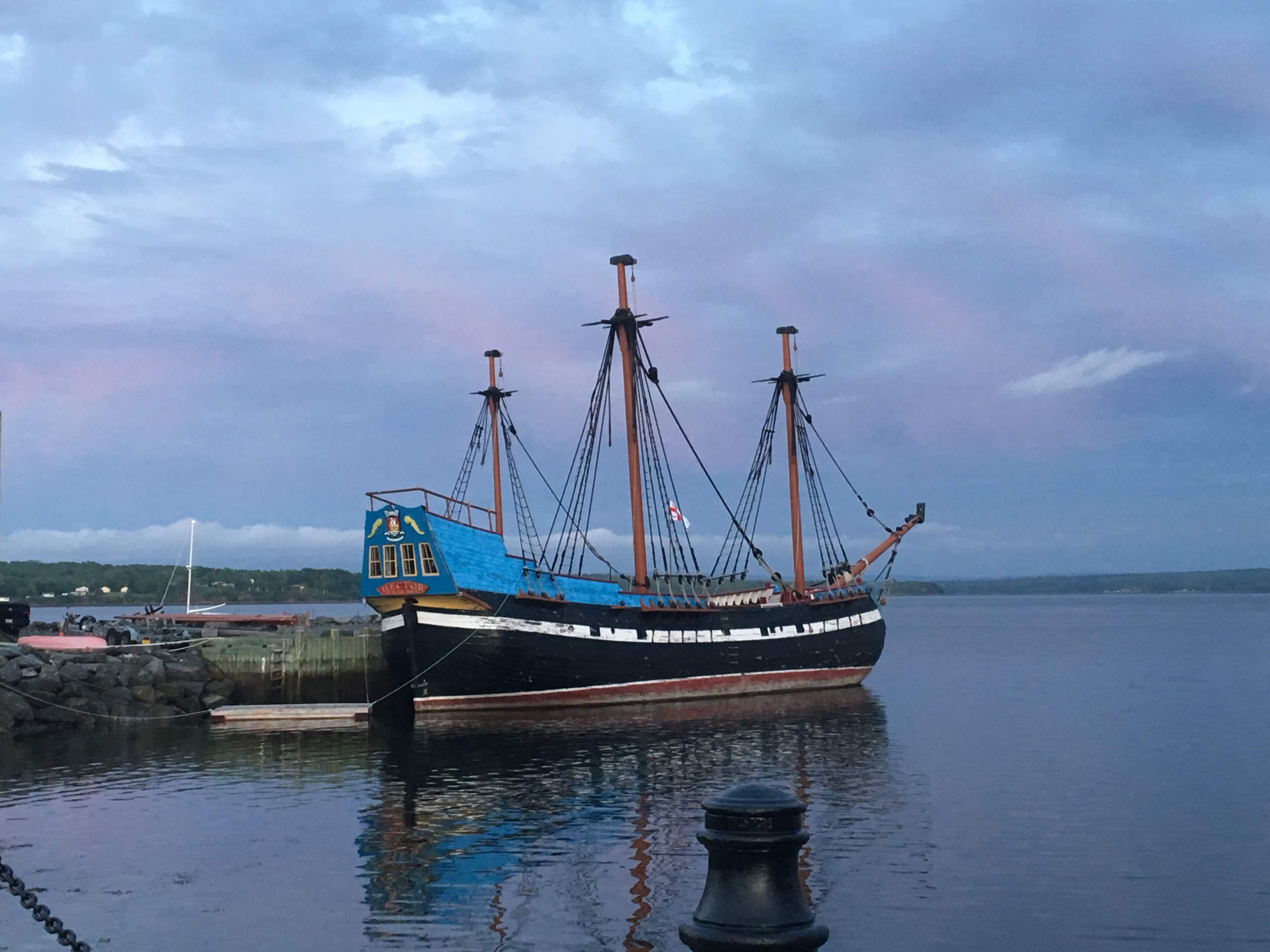
Ship Hector replica floating in Pictou Harbour

Pictou County includes the towns of New Glasgow, Stellarton, Pictou, Westville and Trenton. It is bounded by the Northumberland Strait, Antigonish County, Guysborough County and Colchester County. Pictou Harbour and its three rivers played a vital role in the early days of settlement, as a port of entry, a means of transport and for the export of lumber and coal.

== Demographics ==
As a census division in the 2021 Census of Population conducted by Statistics Canada, Pictou County had a population of 43,657 living in 19,735 of its 22,410 total private dwellings, a change of −0.2% from its 2016 population of 43,748. With a land area of 2,844.1 km^{2} (1,098.1 sq mi), it had a population density of 15.4/km^{2} (39.8/sq mi) in 2021.

Forming the majority of the Pictou County census division, the Municipality of Pictou County, including its Subdivisions A, B, and C, had a population of 20,676 living in 9,146 of its 11,026 total private dwellings, a change of −0.1% from its 2016 population of 20,692. With a land area of 2,795.08 km^{2} (1,079.19 sq mi), it had a population density of 7.4/km^{2} (19.2/sq mi) in 2021.

Population trend

Census	Population	Change (%)
2021	43,657	▼0.2%
2016	43,748	▼4.2%
2011	45,643	▼1.9%
2006	46,513	▼1.0%
2001	46,965	▼3.6%
1996	48,718	▼1.9%
1991	49,649	▼0.2%
1986	49,772	▼1.2%
1981	50,350	N/A
1941	40,789	
1931	39,018	
1921	40,851	
1911	35,858	
1901	33,459	
1891	34,541	
1881	35,535	
1871	32,114	N/A

Mother tongue (2011)

Language	Population	Pct (%)
English only	43,580	96.93%
French only	445	0.99%
Non-official languages	765	1.70%
Multiple responses	165	0.37%

Ethnic Groups (2006) (Note: Respondents who reported multiple ethnic origins are counted more than once in this table.)

Ethnic Origin	Population	Pct (%)
Scottish	22,975	50.1%
Canadian	17,800	38.8%
English	12,270	26.8%
Irish	9,535	20.8%
French	7,480	16.3%
German	3,115	6.8%
North American Indian	1,585	3.5%
Dutch (Netherlands)	1,555	3.4%

== Politics ==
Pictou County is wholly within the federal electoral district of Central Nova. Since the electoral district was reformed in 2004, only two MPs have held the office. Currently, the county is represented federally by the Liberal Party. The seat is held by Liberal MP Sean Fraser, who was elected in 2015.

Pictou County is divided into three provincial electoral districts, namely Pictou Centre, Pictou East and Pictou West. All three are currently held by PC MLAs in the Nova Scotia Legislature.

The towns of New Glasgow, Stellarton, Pictou, Westville and Trenton each have their own town councils. The Municipality of Pictou County serves the remaining rural areas, including Pictou Island. Amalgamation of these six municipal units is occasionally considered. Pictou County District Planning Commission provides planning, development and waste disposal services to all the communities in the county.

Pictou Landing First Nation has reserves at Pictou Landing, Fisher's Grant and Merigomish Harbour.

== Economy ==
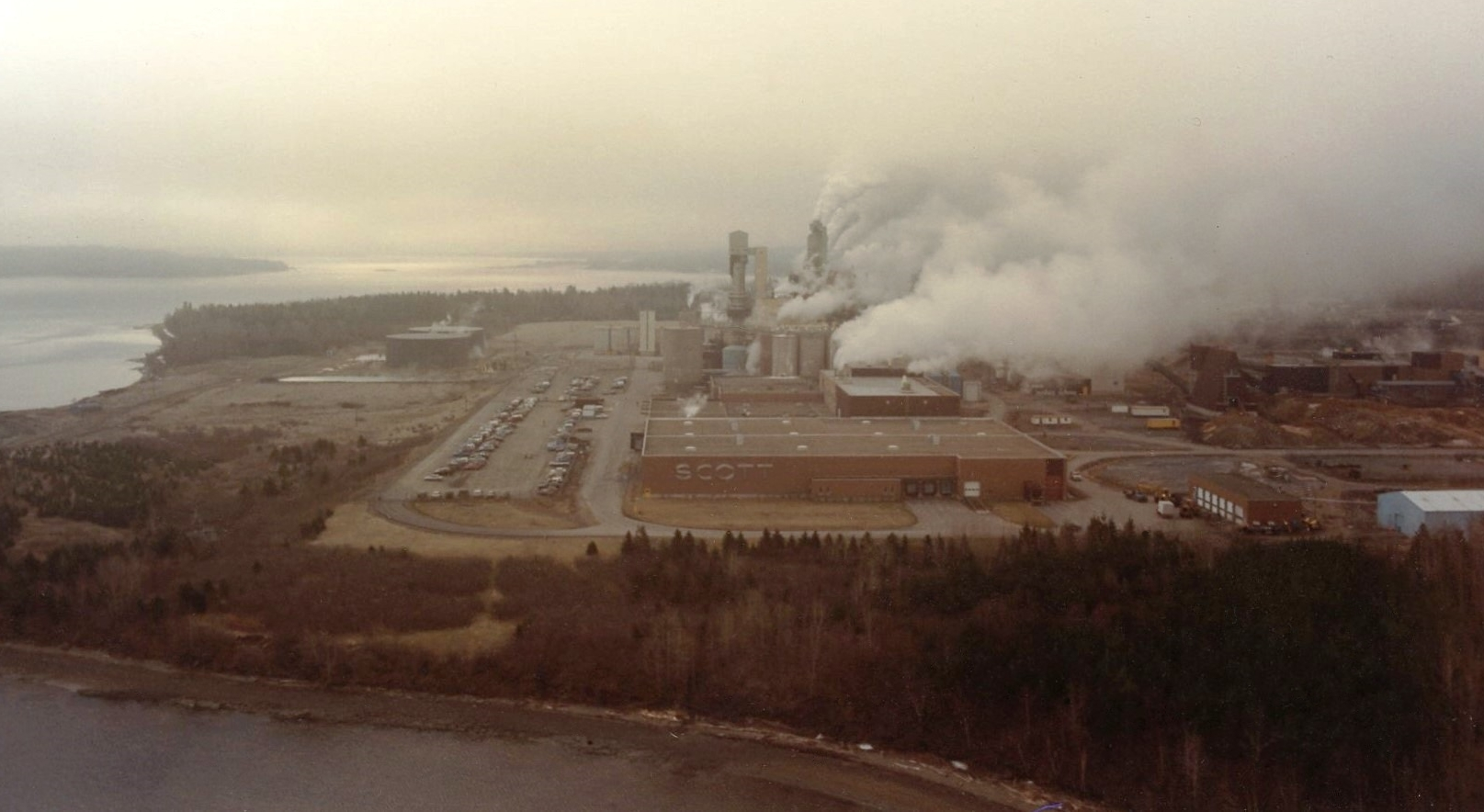
The former Pictou County pulp mill employed roughly 300 employees directly, with hundreds more indirect jobs in related industries.

Resource based industries include coal mining, forestry, fishing, and agriculture. Manufacturing industries include Michelin Tire, Northern Pulp and Scotsburn Dairy. Web.Com operate a call center in New Glasgow. One of the largest employers in the area is Sobeys. The company started in Stellarton, where its headquarters is still located today. Tourism is an important part of the economy during the summer. In 2006 employed 1,200 people and brought 45 million dollars to the economy. Two provincially owned museums operate within the county, Stellarton's Nova Scotia Museum of Industry, and the McCulloch House Museum in Pictou. Rail car manufacturer Trenton Works was closed in 2007 when owners Greenbrier moved production to Mexico. There are 2,400 small and medium-sized businesses that collectively generate more than 15,000 jobs.

The Pictou County Chamber of Commerce is a business advocacy group that speaks as a united voice on behalf of the business community.

== Transport ==
Two highways designated as part of the national Trans-Canada Highway system provide the only controlled-access roads in the county. They are Highway 104, which traverses the county from west to east, and Highway 106 the short north–south spur to the Northumberland Ferries Limited terminal at Caribou.

The Cape Breton and Central Nova Scotia Railway is a freight line connecting Truro to Sydney, with spurs at Stellarton and Trenton serving local industries such as Trenton Generating Station. Via Rail Canada abandoned passenger rail service in the county on January 15, 1990, following nationwide budget cuts.

Maritime Bus provide motor coach service to New Glasgow.

Northumberland Ferries Limited operates a seasonal passenger-vehicle ferry service from Caribou, Nova Scotia, to Wood Islands, Prince Edward Island. A separate passenger-only ferry service is also operated seasonally from Caribou to Pictou Island.

Trenton Aerodrome is a private commercial airport owned and operated by Sobeys.

== Access routes ==
Highways and numbered routes that run through the county, including external routes that start or finish at the county limits:

- Highways
  - Hwy 104 (TCH)
  - Hwy 106 (TCH)
- Trunk routes
  - Trunk 4
  - Trunk 6
- Collector routes:
  - Route 245
  - Route 256
  - Route 289
  - Route 347
  - Route 348
  - Route 374
- External routes:
  - None

== Media ==
Pictou County is served by the weekly newspapers The News and The Pictou Advocate. Pictou County has two locally based radio station is CKEC-FM & CKEZ-FM. A sports and recreation paper is distributed monthly through the mail at no charge.

== Culture ==
There are two performance spaces in the county: the deCoste Centre in Pictou and Glasgow Square in New Glasgow. Both host local musicians and events, including the Festival of Summer Sounds series at the deCoste and the New Glasgow Riverfront Jubilee in August at the Glasgow Square.

Many of the towns and villages host their own parades and events throughout the year. Read By The Sea is an annual literary festival held in the village of River John. The New Scotland Days Festival in Pictou each September is a celebration of the county's Scottish heritage. Pictou also hosts the Lobster Carnival every July since 1934. It was voted the best festival in Canada. New Glasgow's Art at Night is an annual one night art event in downtown New Glasgow. Eventide Art Hub in New Glasgow hosts an Art Gallery, Artist Studios, and a retail space for artists and musicians to sell their work.

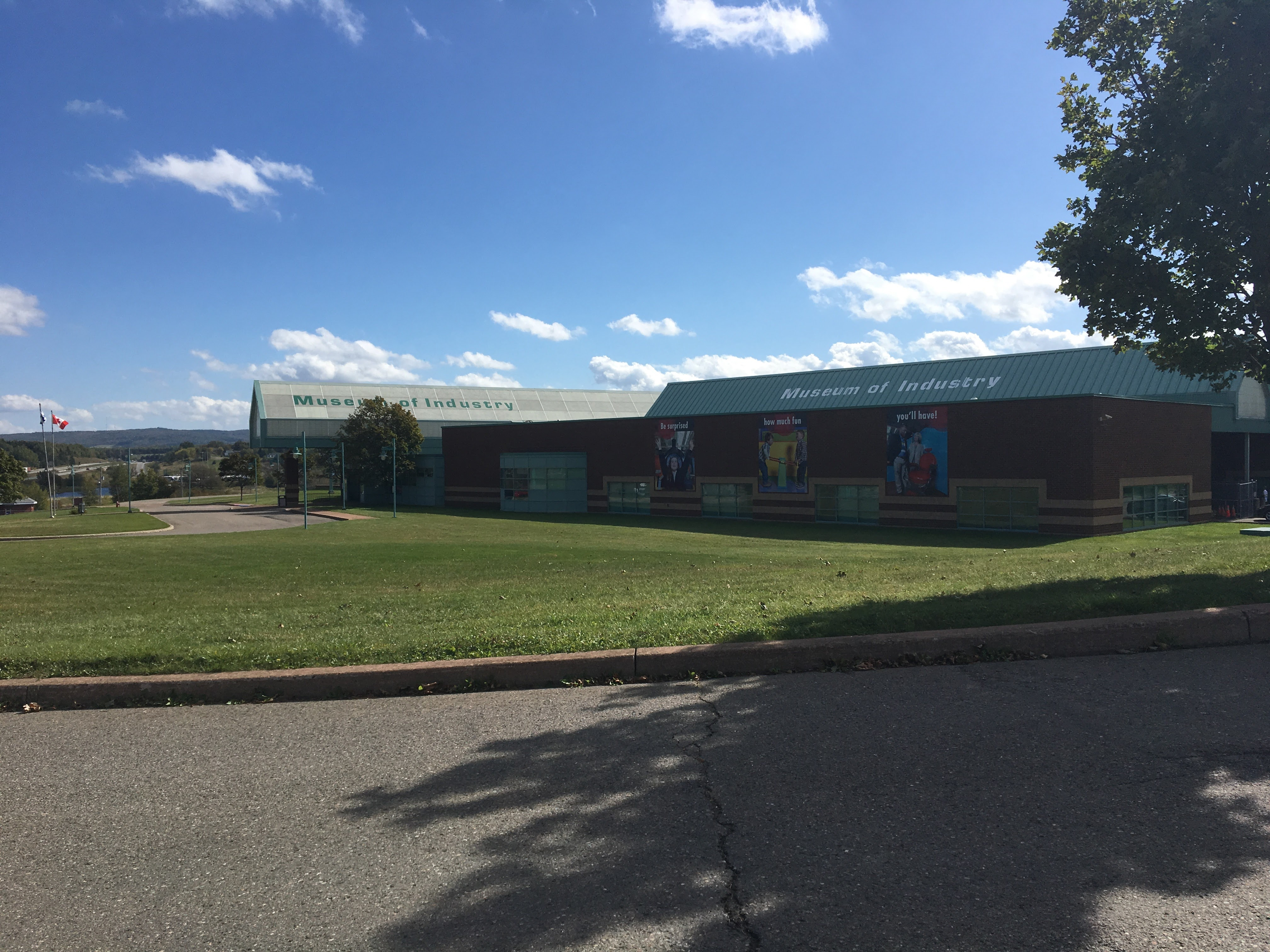
The Nova Scotia Museum of Industry

Museums include the Northumberland Fisheries Museum, the Hector Heritage Quay, and the McCulloch House Museum in Pictou, the Pictou County Military Museum in Westville, the Carmichael House in New Glasgow, and the Museum of Industry in Stellarton.

Pictou County is also known for the regional pizza variant known as Pictou County Pizza, which can be shipped to former residents living across Canada through UPS, and is available in frozen pizzas throughout the Maritimes.

== Notable people ==
=== Politics / Government ===
- Jotham Blanchard, responsible government advocate
- Donald William Cameron, former Premier of Nova Scotia
- John James Grant, Lieutenant Governor of Nova Scotia
- John Hamm, former Premier of Nova Scotia
- Simon Holmes, former premier of Nova Scotia
- Peter MacKay, federal Conservative politician

=== Music / Arts ===
- George Canyon, country singer
- J.D. Fortune, musician, winner of the reality television show Rock Star: INXS
- Dave Gunning, folk singer
- Diego Klattenhoff, actor, known for roles in Homeland and The Blacklist
- Kris MacFarlane, musician
- Mike Smith, actor and musician, better known as Bubbles from Trailer Park Boys
- Christie MacDonald, theatrical actress and soprano.

=== Sports ===
- Buddy Daye, boxer and former Sergeant-at-arms of the Nova Scotia House of Assembly
- Troy Gamble, former NHL goaltender
- Jason MacDonald, MMA fighter
- Joey MacDonald, former NHL goaltender
- Lowell MacDonald, former NHL forward; awarded the Bill Masterton Memorial Trophy in 1973
- Jon Sim, former NHL forward; 1999 Stanley Cup winner
- Blayre Turnbull, (ice hockey, born 1993) Canadian Women's National Hockey team, Olympian, Calgary Inferno CWHL forward
- Derrick Walser, former NHL defenceman
- Colin White, former NHL defenceman; two-time (2000 & 2003) Stanley Cup winner

=== Business / Commercial ===
- Graham Fraser, 19th century industrialist, Founder of the Nova Scotia Steel Company and mayor of New Glasgow
- Frank H. Sobey, businessman and entrepreneur; founder of the Sobeys supermarket chain

=== Other ===
- Whit Fraser, CC, viceregal consort of Canada, former CBC and IBC reporter and broadcaster, founding chair of the Canadian Polar Commission, and former executive director of Inuit Tapiriit Kanatami.
- James Peter Robertson, posthumously awarded the Victoria Cross in the First World War
- Lilly and Jack Sullivan, children who disappeared in 2025.

There are claims by a Johnston family of Pictou, Nova Scotia, that the Mad Trapper of Rat River was Owen Albert Johnston from Pictou County.

== Communities ==
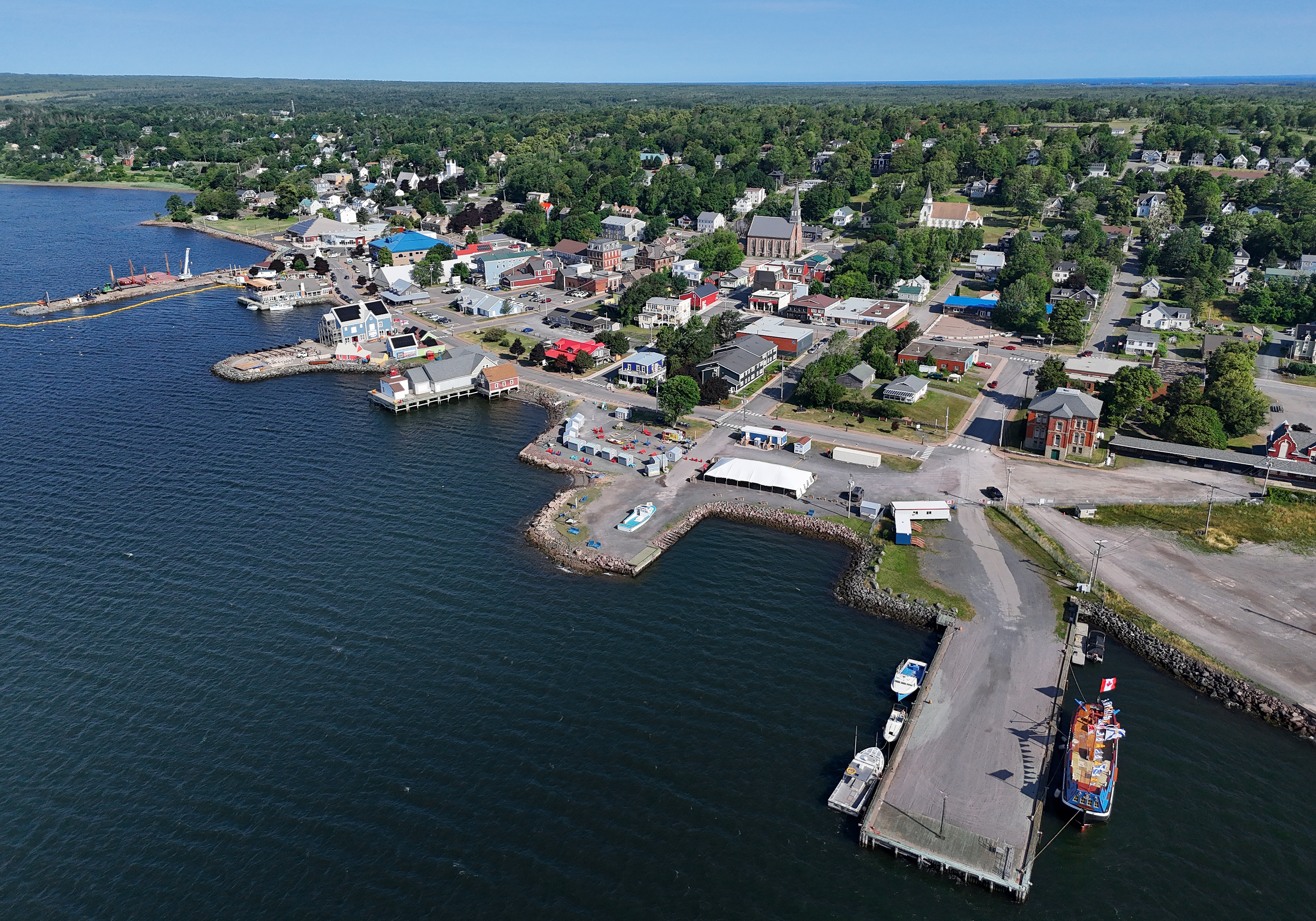
Pictou

Towns

- New Glasgow
- Pictou
- Stellarton
- Trenton
- Westville

Reserves

- Boat Harbour West IR 37
- Fisher's Grant IR 24
- Fisher's Grant IR 24G
- Merigomish Harbour IR 31

County municipality and subdivisions

- Municipality of the County of Pictou
  - Pictou Subdivision A
  - Pictou Subdivision B
  - Pictou Subdivision C

== See also ==
- List of municipalities in Nova Scotia
