= Barnes Island =

Private island in the San Juan Islands

Coordinates: 48.69892°N 122.77563°W

Barnes Island is a small (approx 34 acres, 0.053 sq miles) uninhabited island in San Juan County, Washington, USA. It is located near Clark Island off the northeast coast of Orcas Island. There is no ferry service to it, although it has a small dock. Barnes Island is a privately held island in the San Juans, owned by Charles Bundrandt as of 2013, and is being used for Christian camps, with a permanent group house in addition to tent sites.

The name was given by Charles Wilkes during the Wilkes Expedition of 1838–1842, to honor a sailor who was killed during the Battle of Lake Erie of the War of 1812. The island, along with nearby Clark Island, had been named in 1792 Islas de Aquays, by the Spanish explorer Francisco de Eliza, in honor of Eliza's patron the Viceroy of Mexico, Juan Vicente de Güemes, 2nd Count of Revillagigedo
