= TrentonWorks =

Canadian manufacturing facility

Jeumont-Schnedier
- Type: Subsidiary
- Industry: Rail transport
- Founded: 1872; 154 years ago
- Headquarters: Trenton, Nova Scotia, Canada
- Area served: Worldwide
- Products: wind turbines Freight rail cars

TrentonWorks is an industrial manufacturing facility located in the town of Trenton, Nova Scotia, Canada.

This collection of factories on the bank of the East River of Pictou has witnessed a large variety of industrial operations, ranging from steel making (the first steel plant in Canada), rolling mills, forging, shipbuilding, munitions manufacturing, rivets and bolts, and most recently (and longest lasting) rail cars.

The extensive plant was converted to manufacture wind turbine components for South Korean industrial conglomerate Daewoo Shipbuilding & Marine Engineering in its first foray into North America; this was made possible through corresponding investments by both the Government of Nova Scotia and the Government of Canada.

== History ==
=== Predecessor companies (1872–1962) ===
The Hope Iron Works was founded at Trenton by blacksmiths Graham Fraser and Forrest MacKay in 1872 to produce iron forgings such as anchors for use in wooden sailing ships with the business expanding in 1876 to produce railway car axles.

In 1878 the Nova Scotia Forge Company was constructed on a 160-acre (0.65 km^{2}) site occupying the east bank of the East River of Pictou in Trenton, replacing the Hope Iron Works. The new plant sought markets in producing forgings for the booming railway industry, creating an intense demand for raw steel and iron. The Nova Scotia Steel Company was established in 1882 on the same site to supply raw material to the Nova Scotia Forge Company and produced the first steel in Canada at its Trenton plant using the Siemens process in an open-hearth furnace in 1883. Both companies soon merged to form the Nova Scotia Steel and Forge Company.

Initially the steel mill at Trenton was fed by scrap metal and pig iron imported from Scotland however shortages in scrap saw the New Glasgow Iron, Coal and Railway Company construct an oxygen blast furnace at Ferrona in the upper reaches of the East River valley that would be supplied with iron ore mined at Eureka and Londonderry. Coke was supplied by local coal mines in Stellarton, Westville and Thorburn. These sources of iron ore were soon found to be high in manganese, thus higher quality iron ore was soon discovered at Wabana on Bell Island, Newfoundland which was then shipped to the Ferrona blast furnaces. In 1895, the New Glasgow Iron, Coal and Railway Company purchased rights to some of the Wabana ore deposit for a long-term supply.

That year also saw the New Glasgow Iron, Coal and Railway Company merge with the Nova Scotia Steel and Forge Company to form the Nova Scotia Steel Company, revamping a name used in the previous decade. To maintain production, the company found that coal from the Pictou Coal Field was of poor quality for making coking fuel, thus it purchased the remaining assets of the General Mining Association which were concentrated on the north side of Sydney Harbour on Cape Breton Island – these being mines in the Sydney Mines, Florence and Alder Point areas of northeastern Cape Breton County.

With iron ore being shipped from Newfoundland and coal now being sourced in Cape Breton Island, the company was faced with high transportation costs, thus it was decided to construct a new integrated steel mill at Sydney Mines which opened in 1899. The steel mill and coal mines in Cape Breton, along with the iron ore mine in Newfoundland and the steel mill and forge in Trenton and the blast furnaces in Ferrona were all merged into a new entity in 1900 called the Nova Scotia Steel and Coal Company, which used the acronym SCOTIA.

SCOTIA immediately sought economies of scale and reductions in unprofitable parts of the company. In 1904 the Ferrona blast furnaces were closed and the last steel poured.

By the end of the decade, the last railway boom in Canada was underway with the simultaneous transcontinental railway expansions of the Canadian Northern Railway, Grand Trunk Pacific Railway and the National Transcontinental Railway. SCOTIA made significant investments in its properties over a 3-year period, beginning with the Trenton steel mill which saw 2 rolling mills added to the plant in 1910. This was followed in 1911 when the Trenton plant saw a massive investment in equipment to manufacture and machine heavy forgings. In 1912 SCOTIA established the Eastern Car Company and opened a massive factory to build railway cars on the Trenton site adjacent to the steel mill and forge operations, reputedly the largest factory under one roof in the Dominion of Canada.

The Eastern Car Company produced its first boxcar for the Grand Trunk Railway in August 1913, with GTR #105000 being the first of a 2,000 car order. SCOTIA also established the Dominion Wheel Foundry in 1913 on an adjacent site to Eastern Car Company and the steel mill and forge operation. Dominion Wheel Foundry created cast iron railway wheels in support of its sister operation at the Eastern Car Company. Finally, 1913 also saw SCOTIA establish a bolt and rivet factory to the entire complex.

The arrival of World War I saw railway investment cease in Canada and those industries spiralled toward bankruptcy which resulted in the federal government nationalizing several insolvent companies to which it had lent financial support, resulting in the creation of the Canadian National Railways in 1918. Although a large part of SCOTIA's customer base was lost, the war had other opportunities and SCOTIA established a shipyard on part of its Trenton property fronting the East River of Pictou, constructing 6 steam-powered cargo ships as part of the war effort, totalling 10,395 tons. The factories were re-tooled and soon began producing artillery and naval shells.

With the war entering a stalemate as the Central Powers were increasingly contained by the Allies in a brutal trench warfare on the Western Front, demand for steel began to decrease. SCOTIA was taken over by new investors from the United States in 1917 and the steel mill in Sydney Mines was closed and iron ore production in Newfoundland was transferred to its rival Dominion Steel Corporation of Sydney. SCOTIA was reduced to operating its coal mines in Cape Breton Island and Pictou County, along with its extensive steel and manufacturing operations in Trenton.

The fall-out from World War I and the collapse of new railway construction in Canada saw a syndicate of British investors led by Montreal, Quebec industrialist Roy M. Wolvin negotiate a takeover of SCOTIA's rival Dominion Steel Corporation in 1919. These investors proposed a $500 million merger of Dominion Steel Corporation, along with various British steel and shipbuilding interests. The plan came to fruition in 1921 when SCOTIA was merged with Dominion Steel Corporation to form part of the conglomerate known as the British Empire Steel Corporation (BESCO).

BESCO faced tremendous financial and organized labour problems through the 1920s as industrial and consumer markets changed. By 1928 the company had dissolved and its assets were transferred to a new holding company named the Dominion Steel and Coal Corporation (DOSCO). DOSCO management and marketing practices halted the decline under BESCO and the company was stabilized.

DOSCO's manufacturing complex at Trenton continued much as before, producing railway cars and wheels, as well as various steel products; the complex was consolidated under the name Trenton Industries Ltd. at some point. During World War II, management of the complex was taken over by the federal government for producing naval gun mounts as well as artillery and naval shells, just as it had done during World War I.

Following the war, DOSCO closed the steel rolling mills and bolt and rivet factory at Trenton, focusing its steel production at the much larger plant at Sydney. Declines in the coal and steel industries during the 1950s saw the DOSCO conglomerate, once the largest private employer in the country, lose much of its previous financial clout. DOSCO was purchased in 1957 by A.V. Roe Canada Co. Ltd. and made a subsidiary.

=== Hawker Siddeley ownership (1962–1988) ===
The Dominion Wheel Foundry was closed in 1961 and A.V. Roe was subsequently folded into Hawker Siddeley Canada in 1962 and the Trenton railcar plant and forge were paired with other Hawker Siddeley railcar plants acquired through its subsidiary Canada Car and Foundry in Hamilton and Thunder Bay, Ontario.

Hawker Siddeley sought to reduce losses at its DOSCO subsidiary acquired through the takeover of A.V. Roe. By the mid-1960s, it identified the coal mines and steel mill on Cape Breton Island for closure; these operations were nationalized by the federal and provincial governments under the Cape Breton Development Corporation (DEVCO) and Sydney Steel Corporation (SYSCO) respectively in 1968.

Hawker Siddeley shares in what was left of DOSCO were purchased that year by Sidbec, a provincial Crown corporation in Quebec, which sought to nationalize DOSCO operations in that province. A new holding company named Hawker Industries Ltd. was then formed to acquire certain DOSCO operating units from Sidbec that were not located in Quebec, one of which was the Trenton railcar plant and forge operation. Hawker Industries Ltd. was merged into Hawker Siddeley Canada in 1979.

=== Lavalin ownership (1988–1992) ===
In 1987 Hawker Siddeley Canada sought to consolidate its railcar manufacturing business, selling its Thunder Bay plant to Bombardier and offering its Hamilton and Trenton plants for sale or closure. On April 1, 1988, the Trenton railcar plant and forge operation were sold to Lavalin Industries, a subsidiary of Lavalin Group from Montreal, Quebec which organized the plant and forge under the name Trenton Works Lavalin Inc.; Trenton Works Lavalin Inc. being grouped with other Lavalin Group factories in Ontario under the name UTDC Inc.

=== Government of Nova Scotia ownership (1992–1995) ===
The demise of Lavalin Group/Groupe in December 1991 saw Trenton Works Lavalin Inc. and other operating units facing an uncertain future. Faced with the politically unpalatable option of one of the largest employers in Pictou County being closed, local MLA and Premier of Nova Scotia Donald Cameron opted to have the provincial government purchase the plant and operate it as an independent railcar manufacturer from January 1992 until February 1995 under the name Trenton Works Inc. while the government sought a new owner.

=== Greenbrier ownership (1995–2007) ===
The new administration of Premier John Savage sought to improve the province's fiscal management and reduce liabilities such as Trenton Works and SYSCO, among others. A buyer was found in early 1995 and a joint partnership of Canadian and American business interests purchased the plant on March 9, 1995, with the majority interest being held by Greenbrier Corporation of Lake Oswego, Oregon. The plant was renamed TrentonWorks Ltd. and is a member of The Greenbrier Companies.

Under Greenbrier's ownership, the Trenton railcar plant and forge were operated much as before, however railcar manufacturing at Trenton increased dramatically during the late 1990s and early 2000s as the North American freight car fleet underwent significant expansion and replacement; Canada's record low exchange rates made Trenton a very profitable and low-cost production facility for Greenbrier during this time.

Canada's rising exchange rate and decreasing demand for new railcars by the mid-2000s saw Greenbrier consolidate its operations. The TrentonWorks Forge (a separate operation from the railcar plant) was sold to Forged Metal Products Inc. of Houston, Texas in 2004, which renamed the operation to Nova Forge Corporation. The forge has ceased to operate and an auction of equipment was held in June 2014.

To date the property has produced more than 63,500 freight cars since it opened in 1913. The plant occupies 69,000 m2 (17 acres) of heated floor space under one roof; the main building consisting of four bays, each 90 feet (27 m) wide and 1,100–1,300 feet long. The plant property occupies 650,000 m2 (160 acres) of land. There are 16 km (9.9 mi) of railway track in the facility which is served by its own railway locomotives (several GE 45 ton industrial switchers); the plant interchanges with the Cape Breton and Central Nova Scotia Railway in Trenton.

TrentonWorks has produced virtually every type of railway freight car imaginable, ranging from box cars to reefers, flat cars, tank cars, to modern-day high-capacity covered hoppers, auto racks, centre-partition flat cars for lumber, as well as deep well intermodal cars. Peak production output is approximately 50 cars per week. The TrentonWorks plant is currently operating below capacity due to decreased demand for new railcars with currently employment levels at 200 workers, however peak employment has ranged beyond 1,100 workers in recent years.

Greenbrier had previously purchased two railcar manufacturing plants in Mexico, which had substantially lower operating costs in terms of taxation and employee salaries and benefits. Rumours about the long-term viability of TrentonWorks began to circulate in late 2006 and early 2007 as the union began discussing the possibility of strike action to drain the union local's strike pay accounts, in advance of a possible long-term layoff or permanent closure.

The union instead offered generous concessions which were followed on April 3, 2007, by a generous offer of financial assistance from the provincial and federal governments, which would subsidize the cost per railcar at Greenbrier's TrentonWorks plant.

All offers of assistance from the union and governments were rejected by Greenbrier on April 4, 2007, when the company announced that its TrentonWorks plant would close permanently later in the year once current orders are completed.

The last shift ended at TrentonWorks Ltd. at 1600h ADT on May 4, 2007, one month following the closure announcement.

=== DSME ownership (2010 – present) ===
Following the closure of Greenbrier's railcar manufacturing operation at the facility in 2007, the provincial and federal governments began looking for a buyer to return industrial activity to the site.

On March 5, 2010, the provincial government announced an agreement had been reached with Daewoo Shipbuilding & Marine Engineering (DSME) to reopen the plant and re-tool it to manufacture components for wind turbines.

This is reportedly the first foray into North America by DSME and it is contingent upon a $20 million investment by the company, as well as a $60 million investment by the provincial government and a $10 million investment by the federal government.

In addition to global export potential of wind turbine components, there is a strong local demand growing for these products; Nova Scotia Power has been recently mandated by the Government of Nova Scotia to increase its green energy sources and reduce greenhouse gas emissions by 2020 and is predicted to be a major customer of the DSME wind turbines produced at TrentonWorks.

The venture operated at the site using the logo DSTN and manufacturing towers for wind turbines, subsea structures for tidal power facilities, and pressure vessels for the oil and gas sector. The company was put in receivership in the spring of 2016, owing the Nova Scotia government $56 Million.

As of February 2018 the receivers were still looking for a buyer, with the commitment of $150,000 per month from the government to maintain the property expiring at the end of the fiscal year.
