= Pictou Landing First Nation =

First Nation in Nova Scotia

Coordinates: 45°40′30″N 62°39′00″W

Pictou Landing First Nation in Nova Scotia

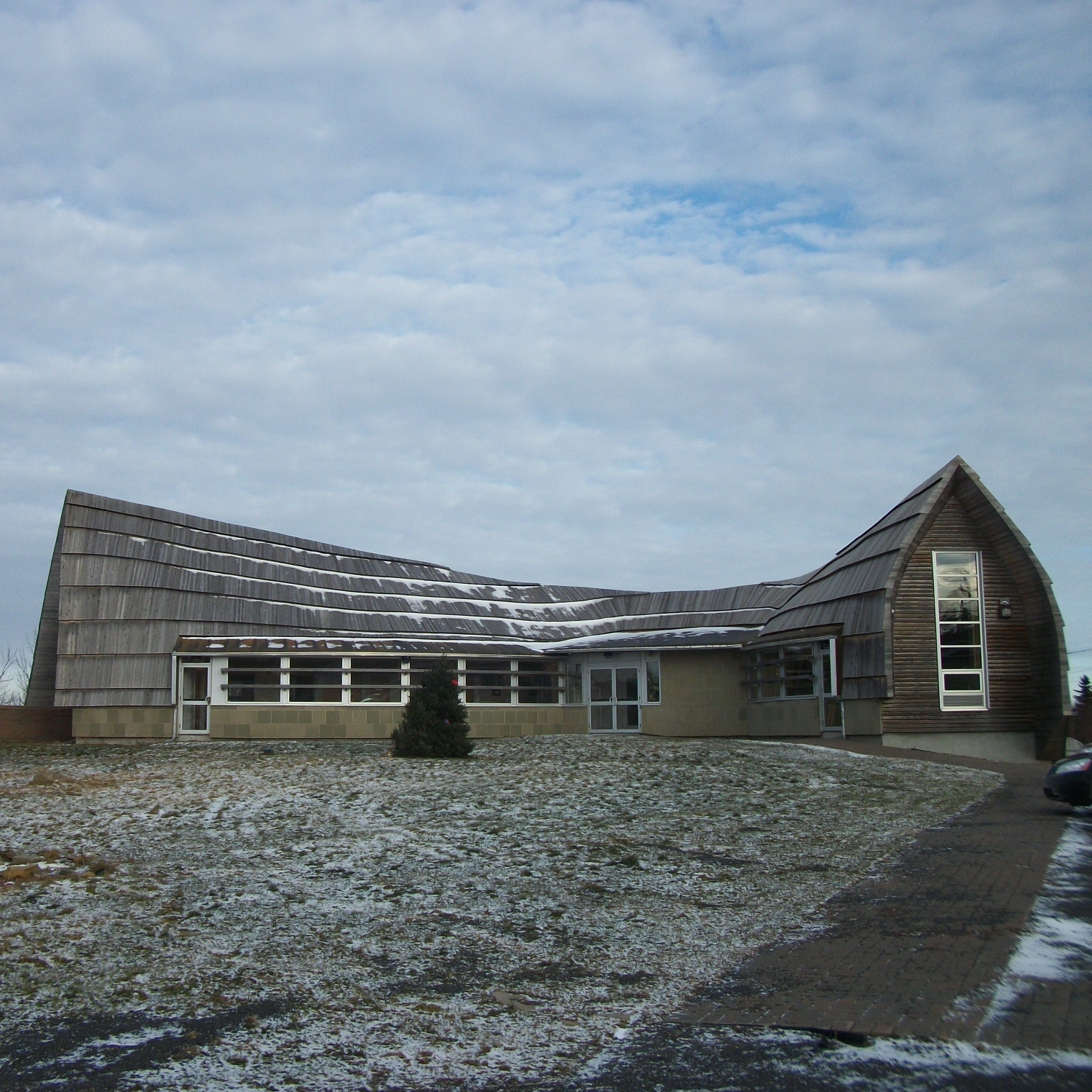
Pictou Landing Health Centre (Fisher's Grant 24)

Pictou Landing First Nations is a Mi'kmaq First Nation band government in Nova Scotia, Canada. Their territory spans five reserves that have a combined area of 527.6 hectares (1,304 acres). As of September 2017, the Mi'kmaq population is 485 on their own reserve, 23 on other reserves and 157 living off-reserve.

== Chief and council ==
The elective council system was adopted at Pictou Landing in 1951.

Incumbent Chief Andrea Paul was re-elected for her third term as chief in November 2015 using the Indian Act election system. Six councillors were elected at the same time, three of them having served previously. 71 per cent of the 393 eligible voters cast ballots. Elections are held every two years.

== Pictou Landing reserves ==
Pictou Landing First Nation has five reserves, the only populated one being Fisher's Grant 24 at the mouth of Pictou Harbour and adjacent to Boat Harbour, a former tidal lake now part of the effluent treatment system for the pulp mill at Abercrombie Point. Facilities on this reserve include the band's administrative offices, fire hall, training centre, and P–6 school. The health centre was built in 2007 and its construction was inspired by traditional techniques used in longhouses and birch bark canoes. The truss system was built using long, slender greenwood trees lashed together with metal strapping. The exterior is clad with large spruce shingles.

Community	Area	Location	Population	Date established
Boat Harbour West 37	98.2 hectares (243 acres)	8 km north of New Glasgow	0	18 May 1961
Fisher's Grant 24	142.7 hectares (353 acres)	10 km north of New Glasgow	485	3 March 1866
Fisher's Grant 24G	60 hectares (150 acres)	3.2 km southeast of Pictou Landing	0	3 March 1927
Franklin Manor 22 (part)	212.5 hectares (525 acres)	32 km southeast of Amherst	0	3 March 1865
Merigomish Harbour 31	14.2 hectares (35 acres)	12.8 km east of New Glasgow	0	3 March 1865

== Boat Harbour ==
Boat Harbour is a body of water formerly used by the First Nation. In the 1960s it was taken over by the Province of Nova Scotia for use as a settling pond for effluent from the nearby pulp mill. It quickly became polluted with heavy metals and organic chemicals and was the source of ongoing disputes between the First Nation and governments. The Boat Harbour Act 2015 set a deadline for closing the treatment facility no later than 31 January 2020, after which the site was to be cleaned up. This will involve removing an estimated 350,000 cubic metres (12 million cu ft) of contaminated material and returning the lagoon to a tidal estuary.

In a decision in the Provincial Court of Nova Scotia, Honourable Judge Del W. Atwood stated:

The undeniable truth is that the experience of the Pictou Landing First Nation has been one of subjugation and suppression under the Canadian federation. It shares this history with the other First Nations of Canada, as described succinctly in the Report of the Truth and Reconciliation Commission of Canada. An instance of that injustice was the manner in which a pulp mill came to [be] located at Abercrombie Point in Pictou County fifty years ago; along with the mill was built an effluent-treatment plant in Boat Harbour.

A 2013 study found that pollution, from both Boat Harbour and the exhaust stacks at the mill, has compromised access to traditional foods such as game, fish and berries, and dissuaded residents from growing gardens. This negatively impacted food security on the reserve.

In December 2019 Nova Scotia Premier Stephen McNeil turned down the pulp mill's request for an extension of the deadline to cease polluting the harbor. "The company has had five years and any number of opportunities," he said. "Cleaning up Boat Harbor is all my people have ever wanted," said Pictou Landing chief Andrea Paul. "Premier Stephen McNeil kept his promise and, on behalf of my community, we are thankful."

== Notable residents ==
- Anna Mae Aquash, activist, spent some of her childhood here.
