= Beaver Island (Rio Grande) =

Uninhabited island in Texas, United States

- Interactive map of Beaver Island
- Etymology: Roma, Texas

Geography
- Location: Rio Grande
- Coordinates: 26°23′36″N 98°59′57″W
- Area: 20.3 acres (8.2 ha)

Administration
- United States
- State: Texas
- County: Starr County

Beaver Island (also known as La Isla de Morteritos) is an uninhabited island in the Rio Grande located between Starr County, Texas and Ciudad Miguel Alemán, Tamaulipas, Mexico.

== History ==
Due to the islands location on the Mexico-United States border, it has switched governance numerous times. The Boundary Treaty of 1970 saw the island move to Mexican control.

In March 2025, Texas Land Commissioner Dawn Buckingham, requested that the island, along with the nearby Roma Islands, be transferred back to the United States, due to ongoing drug cartel activity on the island.
