= Big Island (Hudson Bay, Nunavut) =

Island in the Qikiqtaaluk Region, Nunavut, Canada

- Location within Nunavut Location within Canada

Geography
- Location: Hudson Bay
- Coordinates: 60°01′N 77°16′W
- Archipelago: Arctic Archipelago

Administration
- Canada
- Nunavut: Nunavut
- Region: Qikiqtaaluk

Demographics
- Population: Uninhabited

Big Island is a small, uninhabited island located in Hudson Bay near the community of Puvirnituq, Quebec, Canada. The island, one of three islands named "Big Island" in the Qikiqtaaluk Region of Nunavut, is part of the Arctic Archipelago.
