= Big Island (James Bay, Nunavut) =

Island in Qikiqtaaluk Region, Nunavut, Canada

- Location within Nunavut Location within Canada

Geography
- Location: Northern Canada
- Coordinates: 53°44′N 079°09′W
- Archipelago: Arctic Archipelago

Administration
- Canada
- Nunavut: Nunavut
- Region: Qikiqtaaluk

Demographics
- Population: Uninhabited

Big Island is a small, uninhabited island located in James Bay near the community of Chisasibi, Quebec, Canada. The island, one of three named "Big Island" in the Qikiqtaaluk Region of Nunavut, is part of the Arctic Archipelago.
