= HMS Dittany =

Modified Flower-class corvette

History

United Kingdom
- Name: Dittany
- Namesake: Dittany
- Builder: Collingwood Shipyards Ltd., Collingwood
- Launched: 31 October 1942
- Fate: Transferred to the United States Navy

United States
- Name: Beacon
- Namesake: Verb:Beacon
- Acquired: 7 March 1943
- Fate: Transferred to the Royal Navy

United Kingdom
- Name: Dittany
- Commissioned: 31 May 1943
- Identification: Pennant number: K 279
- Fate: Sold commercial 1950, scrapped 1 April 1966

General characteristics
- Class & type: Flower-class corvette
- Displacement: 1,375 long tons (1,397 t)
- Length: 205 ft (62 m)
- Beam: 33 ft (10 m)
- Draft: 14 ft 7 in (4.45 m)
- Speed: 16.5 kn (19.0 mph; 30.6 km/h)
- Complement: 90
- Armament: 2 × 3"/50 dual purpose gun mounts; 2 × 20 mm gun mounts; 2 × depth charge tracks

HMS Dittany was a Flower-class corvette of the British Royal Navy during the Second World War.

On 14 August 1942, the name Beacon was approved for PG 88, a modified Flower-class corvette being built at Collingwood, Ontario, Canada. Records indicate that Beacon was to have been accepted under "reverse lend lease", commissioned in Canada, and then taken to the Boston Navy Yard for outfitting. Assigned, first, to the United Kingdom on 30 January 1943, but reassigned to the US Navy on 7 March 1943, she was reassigned again to the Royal Navy on 31 May 1943, and commissioned as HMS Dittany, her original British name. She served under that name for the rest of the war.
