= Beacon high schools in Beijing =

Category of high schools in Beijing, China

Beacon high schools in Beijing (Chinese: 北京市高中示范校; pinyin: Běijīng-shì Gāozhōng Shìfàng Xìao; lit. 'Model Highschools of Beijing Municipality') is a system used by the municipal government of Beijing, China to designate model high schools.

Traditionally, some high schools in China have been statically designated as "key schools", which are associated with academic prestige and preferential resource allocation.

Over the last decade, the municipality has been in the process of changing it into a beacon high school (示范高中) system, which is subject to specific criteria and periodic reviews. The long-term goal is to establish about 60 "large in scale, well-equipped and high quality" high schools, as examples of excellence.

Beacon's first batch of model schools in October 2002 consisted of 14 schools. To date, however, a total of 68 schools are currently listed as "beacon" high schools.

== See also ==
- Magnet school
