= Beacon Island, North Carolina =

Coordinates: 35°05′54″N 76°02′49″W

Beacon Island, in Portsmouth Township, Carteret County, North Carolina, is an island in the Ocracoke Inlet. The island was used as part of a trading port developed in the late 1700s, and during the American Civil War it was the site of the Confederate Army Fort Okrakoke. Erosion has steadily degraded the island, which measured about twenty acres in size in the 18th century but had shrunk to about 7.5 acres by 2014. As of 2016, Beacon Island was owned by Audubon North Carolina as a bird refuge—it was home to a large population of pelicans until Hurricane Arthur struck in 2014 and damaged the island to an extent that the pelicans left, leaving a population of herons, egrets, gulls, and terns.
