= Fisher's Grant 24 =

Mi'kmaq reserve in Nova Scotia, Canada

Coordinates: 45°40′26.99″N 62°39′24.9″W

Fisher's Grant 24 in Nova Scotia

Fisher's Grant 24 is a Mi'kmaq reserve located in Pictou County, Nova Scotia.

It is solely used by the Pictou Landing First Nation.
