= Beaver Island (Antarctica) =

Island in Amundsen Bay, Antarctica

- Location within Antarctica

Geography
- Location: Antarctica
- Coordinates: 67°7′S 50°47′E
- Length: 3.7 km (2.3 mi)
- Width: 1.9 km (1.18 mi)

Administration
- Administered under the Antarctic Treaty System

Demographics
- Population: Uninhabited

Beaver Island is an island in Antarctica, 3.7 kilometres (2 nmi) long and 1.9 kilometres (1 nmi) wide, situated on the south flank of Beaver Glacier in Amundsen Bay. It was first visited in 1956 by an Australian National Antarctic Research Expeditions party led by P. W. Crohn, and so named because of its proximity to Beaver Glacier.
