= The Beacon (Kansas City) =

Non-profit online news outlet in the Kansas City area

Coordinates: 39°03′27″N 94°34′47″W

- The Beacon (Kansas City) 2020-12-13
- Type: Nonprofit
- Format: Online digital news
- Founder: Kelsey Ryan
- Editor-in-chief: Chris Lester (interim)
- CEO: Stephanie Campbell
- Founded: 2020
- Political alignment: Nonpartisan
- Headquarters: 300 E. 39th St. Kansas City, MO 64111
- City: Kansas City
- Website: kcbeacon.org

The Beacon is a non-profit online news outlet in the Kansas City metropolitan area focusing on public-interest journalism. It is Kansas City's first regional nonprofit news outlet that is not a public television or radio station.

It was founded in 2020 by Kelsey Ryan, a former Investigative journalist for the Kansas City Star and a 2018 Pulitzer Prize finalist. It launched earlier than planned on March 12, 2020, in response to community information needs with the COVID-19 pandemic. The news network is overseen by an eight-member Board of Directors and the Kansas City newsroom works with a 10-member community advisory board. The news organization received initial funding from a Google News Initiative Innovation Challenge in 2019 and has received additional funding from the Solutions Journalism Network in order to write about broadband infrastructure in Kansas and Missouri. It is a member of the Institute for Nonprofit News, Local Independent Online News Publishers (LION), and the Kansas Press Association.

The Beacon won the 2020 "Emerging Publisher" award from Local Independent Online News (LION) Publishers. It also won the 2021 "Community Champion" award from the Institute for Nonprofit News.

In 2021, The Beacon expanded into a regional news network beyond Kansas City, and launched a second local newsroom in Wichita, Kansas, called The Wichita Beacon. The expansion into a regional news network from a single newsroom was spurred with a commitment of $1.1 million from the Wichita Community Foundation and funding from the American Journalism Project.

Ryan, founder and publisher of The Beacon, left the organization in 2022 for a job as the executive director of the Association of Health Care Journalists.

In September 2024, NiemanLab reported on a pattern of high staff turnover at The Wichita Beacon. The Wichita newsroom ceased publication in October 2024.
