= Beaver Island (Massachusetts) =

Island in Franklin County, Massachusetts, United States

Coordinates: 42°40′06″N 72°57′33″W

Beaver Island is a heavily forested and uninhabited island located on the Deerfield River in Rowe, Massachusetts.
