= Safe seat =

Electoral district considered to be secure

A safe seat is an electoral district which is regarded as fully secure, for either a certain political party, the incumbent representative personally, or a combination of both. Safe seats are considered unlikely to change hands because of the political leanings of the electorate in the constituency concerned or the popularity of the incumbent member. This contrasts with a marginal seat, in which a defeat for the seat holder is considered possible. In systems where candidates must first win the party's primary election or preselection, the phrase "tantamount to election" is often used to describe winning the dominant party's nomination for a safe seat.

== Definition ==
There is a spectrum between safe and marginal seats. Supposedly safe seats can still change hands in a landslide election, such as Enfield Southgate being lost by the Conservatives (and then-potential future party leader Michael Portillo) to Labour at the 1997 UK general election, whilst other seats may remain marginal despite large national swings, such as Gedling, which Labour narrowly won in every election for twenty years until the 2019 general election, despite having both major victories and defeats during this time. Gedling would still be seen as a marginal seat, even though it had been held by Labour for a long time. Safe seats are usually seats that have been held by one party for a long time, but the two concepts are not interchangeable.

In countries with parliamentary government, parties often try to ensure that their most talented or influential politicians are selected to contest these seats – in part to ensure that these politicians can stay in parliament, regardless of the specific election result, and that they can concentrate on ministerial roles without needing to spend too much effort on managing electorate-specific issues.

Candidate selection for a party's safe seats is usually keenly contested, although many parties restrict or forbid challenges to the nomination of sitting members. The selection process can see the incumbent party, untroubled by the need to have a representative that must appeal to a broader electorate, take the opportunity to choose a candidate from the more ideological reaches of the membership. Opposing parties will often be compelled to nominate much less well-known individuals (such as backroom workers or youth activists in the party), who will sometimes do little more than serve as paper candidates who do little or no campaigning, or will use the contest to gain experience so that they become more likely to be selected for a more winnable seat. In some cases (especially in the United States), these seats may go uncontested by other major parties.

Safe seats can become marginal seats (and vice versa) gradually as voter allegiances shift over time. This shift can happen more rapidly for a variety of reasons. The retirement or death of a popular sitting member may make a seat more competitive, as the accrued personal vote of a long-serving parliamentarian will sometimes have resisted countervailing demographic trends. An independent or third-party candidate with an ideology close to that of the incumbent party may also be able to make a more credible challenge than more established parties, but these factors can combine: a retiring third-party member may turn a safe seat for that party into a marginal seat. For instance, in Berwick-upon-Tweed, with the retirement of the popular incumbent Alan Beith, the seat was no longer safe for the Liberal Democrats.

Traditionally safe seats can also be more vulnerable in by-elections, especially for governing parties. Safe seats may also become marginal if the sitting member is involved in scandal: in 1997, Tatton was gained from the Conservatives by an anti-sleaze independent candidate, despite the majority previously being that of a very safe seat for the Conservatives. The incumbent, Neil Hamilton, had been mired in controversy, and was defeated by the veteran BBC journalist Martin Bell, who was aided by the decision of the main opposition parties (Labour and the Liberal Democrats) not to field candidates. Without such pacts, a split vote is more likely under a first past the post electoral system, as in the UK.

Opposition supporters in safe seats have restricted means to affect election outcomes, and thus the incumbent parties can, in theory, decide to ignore those supporters' concerns, as they have no direct effect on the election result. Even those voters who are moderate supporters of the incumbent party may be disenfranchised by having a representative whose views may be more extreme than their own. Political objectors in such areas may experience marginalisation from wider democratic processes and political apathy. This is often regarded as undemocratic, and is a major argument in favour of various multi-member proportional representation election methods. Safe seats may receive far less political funding than marginal seats, as the parties will attempt to "buy" marginal seats with funding (a process known in North America and Australia as "pork barrelling"), while ignoring safe seats which will reliably fall to the same party every time; this is especially true in cases where the safe seat is held by the minority party.

In countries that do not apply the first past the post system, many of which equally operate a geographic division-based system, selected or party sub-nominated candidates can be allocated a safer or more tenuous list position. If a party is strong enough nationwide to gather representations in all subdivisions, the top candidate(s) on each list tend to be very safely elected to parliament. This is seen in the extremely proportional election systems of the Nordic countries, for example. Safe seats and candidates can be avoided altogether by a purposefully marginal-preference allocation of all divisions, ensuring all divisions are near-identically demographically diverse which may be achieved by pairing non-adjoining areas.

== Australia ==
The Australian Electoral Commission defines seat margins as follows:

Winning 2PP vote	Margin	Classification
50 to 56%	0 to 6%	Marginal
56 to 60%	6 to 10%	Fairly safe
60 to 68%	10 to 18%	Safe
Over 68%	Over 18%	Very safe

In his election analysis, psephologist Antony Green puts the cutoff between "safe" and "very safe" at 12%.

In Australia's federal system, most rural seats are safe seats for either the National Party or Liberal Party. Conversely, inner-city and poorer suburban seats are typically safe Australian Labor Party seats, and a few of the most affluent inner-middle urban seats are held by the Liberal Party. Marginals are generally concentrated in the middle-class outer-suburban areas of Australia's larger state capitals, which therefore decide most Australian federal elections.

At the 2007 federal election, the governing Australian Labor Party's safest seat was the seat of Division of Batman in Melbourne's inner-northern suburbs, with a two-party-preferred margin of 26.0%. The safest seat for the opposition Liberal Party was the rural Victorian electorate of Murray, with a margin of 18.3%. The Liberal Party's junior coalition partner, the National Party's safest seat was the division of Mallee, also located in rural Victoria, with a margin of 21.3%. Following the 2022 election, the Division of Newcastle, which Labor have held since the Federation of Australia in 1901, was the safest Labor seat in the country, and was held by the father-son combination of David Watkins and David Oliver Watkins from 1901 to 1958.

== Canada ==
Examples include:

- Beauséjour, a riding in southeastern New Brunswick, is considered a safe seat for the Liberal Party. In 1990, when Jean Chrétien needed an open seat to become Leader of the Opposition, he chose Beauséjour in a by-election and won.
- Bow River, in southern Alberta, is considered a safe seat for the Conservatives. In the 2015 federal election, Conservative candidate Martin Shields won by 77% of the vote.
- Central Nova, located in east-central Nova Scotia, which has previously been called a safe seat for the Conservative Party and its predecessor, the Progressive Conservative Party, having been held by either Elmer MacKay or his son Peter for all but five of forty years until 2015. The only time the riding was not in Conservative control was from 1993 to 1997, when the Progressive Conservatives were reduced to just two seats nationwide and the Liberals fielded a socially conservative candidate, Roseanne Skoke. In 1983, when Brian Mulroney became Progressive Conservative leader and needed a seat in the House of Commons, he chose to run in Central Nova. Liberal MP Sean Fraser won the seat in 2015, and was re-elected in 2019, 2021 and 2025.
- Crowfoot, a Conservative stronghold located in southern Alberta, has been called the safest seat in the entire country. In the 2008 election, Conservative candidate Kevin Sorenson won 82.04% of the vote, and in a ranking measuring the electoral competitiveness of ridings by National Post reporter Dan Arnold, the district came in last in all of Canada, having an average margin of victory of 74%.
  - Battle River—Crowfoot, the successor to Crowfoot, is a solid Conservative stronghold and is considered one of the most solid seats in Canada. In the 2015 federal election, Conservative candidate Sorenson won by 80.91% of the vote. After Conservative leader Pierre Poilievre lost his long-held seat of Carleton in the 2025 federal election, he was quickly returned to Parliament later that year after contesting a by-election in Battle River—Crowfoot.
- Mount Royal, a Liberal stronghold in Montreal, Quebec, has had a succession of Liberal MPs representing it since 1940, including longtime prime minister Pierre Trudeau. Liberal Irwin Cotler won over 75% of the vote in the 2004 federal election.
- Ottawa—Vanier—Gloucester, a Liberal stronghold in the eastern part of Ottawa, has elected a Liberal Member of Parliament each federal election since its creation in 1935, often in landslide victories. In fact, the previous electoral district which comprises most of the constituency, Russell, had been solidly Liberal since 1887.
- Portage—Lisgar, one of many rural, southern safe seats in the Prairies for the Conservative Party of Canada.
- Saint-Laurent—Cartierville is another Liberal safe seat in Montreal. It has been held by the Liberals since its creation. In the 2004 federal election, incumbent Stéphane Dion won with over 65% of the vote, and over 21,000 votes more than his closest rival.
- Wild Rose, a Conservative stronghold, also in southern Alberta. In his first election in 2008, MP Blake Richards won 72.9% of the vote, which ranked as the largest majority win in its history. His predecessor, Myron Thompson, won 72% compared to 10% for his closest rival in the 2006 federal election.
- York Centre, a safe seat for the Liberals in Toronto. Since the district's re-establishment in 1952, it has been out of Liberal hands only twice.
- The City of Toronto, which holds 25 ridings is often considered a Liberal stronghold, having shut out the Conservative Party from the city in the six elections between 1993 and 2008, and having lost at most two ridings in the 2004, 2006 and 2008 elections to the New Democratic Party. The 2011 Canadian Federal Election ended the Liberal fortress of Toronto when both Conservatives and New Democrats elected many new MPs in Toronto. The former Liberal strength was restored in 2015 as they won all 25 Toronto ridings. The city is not as safe at the provincial level; for instance, the Liberal Party of Ontario won only 3 of Toronto's 41 ridings in the 2018 provincial election.
- Fundy Royal, a riding in Southern New Brunswick, is usually a safe seat for Conservatives. It has only been held by two Liberal MPs since its founding in 1914, its first having held one term from 1993 to 1997 and the latest having been elected in 2015.
- Southern Calgary, particularly Calgary Shepard, Calgary Heritage and Calgary Midnapore, is considered to be a solid Conservative stronghold. In the 3 April 2017 by-elections, the Conservative candidate for Midnapore won by 77% of the vote and the Conservative candidate for Heritage won by 71% of the vote. In the 2015 federal election, the Conservative candidate for Shepard won by 65% of the vote.
- Sturgeon River—Parkland, located in Alberta near Edmonton, is considered a Conservative stronghold. In the 23 October 2017 by-election, the Conservative candidate won by 77% of the vote.
- Battlefords—Lloydminster—Meadow Lake, located in Eastern Saskatchewan, is considered a Conservative stronghold, despite its low population. In the 11 December 2017 by-election, the Conservative candidate won by 69% of the vote.

== Fiji ==
In Fiji, prior to the December 2006 military coup, elections were held under the 1997 Constitution, which allotted 46 of the House of Representatives' 71 seats on an ethnic basis. 23 were reserved for the indigenous majority, 19 for Indo-Fijians, 1 for Rotumans, and 3 for members of all other ethnic minorities. There was a strong tendency toward voting on ethnic lines. Thus, in the 1999 general election, although the indigenous seats were split between several parties, all 19 Indo-Fijian seats were won by the Fiji Labour Party – which won none of the indigenous seats. In the 2001 general election, the conservative indigenous nationalist Soqosoqo Duavata ni Lewenivanua party won 18 of the indigenous seats, with the other 5 going to the ultra-nationalist Conservative Alliance – which later merged into the SDL. All 19 "Indian" seats were retained by the Labour Party. In the 2006 general election, all Indo-Fijian seats remained safely Labour, while the SDL won all 23 indigenous seats. Among other minorities, only the communal seat of West Central was a safe seat for the ethnic United Peoples Party.

The new Constitution adopted in 2013 abolished constituency representation altogether, in favour of party list seat allocation based on nationwide results. The 2014 general election was held on that basis, thus putting an end to all safe seats. The Labour Party suffered a near wipe-out.

== Hong Kong ==
There is no formal definition in Hong Kong, yet there are some functional constituency seats which are regarded as fully secured by a political party or a political camp.

Fully secured by the pan-democracy camp:

- Education, formerly called Teaching in the colonial period, has been a safe seat of HKPTU since 1985 until now. Except the incumbent Ip Kin-yuen, the LEGCO member elected in this constituency are members of the Democratic Party Hong Kong.
- Legal has been a safe seat of Pro-democracy camp since 1985, and a safe seat for Civic Party since 2008. Ip Sik On, who was elected by this constituency in 1991, is the only one who is not from the pro-democracy camp.

Fully secured by the pro-Beijing camp:

- Agriculture and Fisheries, which has been held by the Democratic Alliance for the Betterment and Progress of Hong Kong since its creation in 1998, with the DAB candidate being unopposed from 2000 to 2008.

== Indonesia ==
In Indonesia, a safe seat is defined as a constituency where not many well known figures contesting in the area or able to gain a comfortable win. One well known electoral district defined as such is East Java VII (covering Pacitan, Ngawi, Magetan and Trenggalek), a well known holdout for Demokrat because of Edhie Yudhoyono's candidacy as one of the members representing the district.

The term is also used for people who feel it is easy to advance in electoral districts which are considered to be marginal electoral districts.

== Malaysia ==
In Malaysia, the percentage of votes secured by a winning candidate defines the seat margin. In this case:

- A seat with winning percentage under 55.9% by a candidate identified as 'Margin' seat.
- A seat with winning percentage between 56% and 59.9% by a candidate identified as 'Fairly safe' seat.
- A seat with winning percentage more than 60% by a candidate identified as 'Safe' seat.

The northern, east coast, and rural constituencies have been safe seats for the Pan Malaysian Islamic Party (PAS) and Perikatan Nasional (PN). Especially in Kelantan, PAS has been in government since 1990 (7 consecutive terms).

Pakatan Harapan, the senior coalition in the current government has been a dominant coalition in highly industrialized states, namely Penang, Selangor and Kuala Lumpur. Even prior to the 2008 elections which ended Barisan Nasional dominant over the country, PH and its predecessors performed well in these states despite never having a chance to rule over the states before. For Barisan Nasional, another major partner in the government, the southern states and Sabah are the safe seats for the coalition. During its dominant period, it also controlled Sarawak and west coast states.

Sabah and Sarawak are safe states for their local parties, with Gabungan Rakyat Sabah and Gabungan Parti Sarawak governing the states with supermajority. For Sabah, despite being described as a swing state in the past, it has been consistently ruled by parties that once a part in BN. Prior to the 2018 elections, these states were described as 'fixed deposits' for BN as they won almost all seats there with a landslide.

== New Zealand ==
In New Zealand, many rural electorates, and those based in wealthy suburban areas, notably the North Shore and eastern suburbs of Auckland, are considered safe seats for the National Party. An example of a safe National seat is East Coast Bays, currently held by Erica Stanford, who gained 71.52% of votes in the 2023 election, with only 19% of votes going to her Labour rival. By contrast, inner-city and poorer suburban electorates such as those in South Auckland are typically safe Labour seats. For example, in 2023, the seat of Mangere was held by Labour list MP Lemauga Lydia Sosene with just under 60% of the vote, while her National rival won just under 20% of the vote even despite the nationwide Labour losses of that year.

Historically, some seats thought to be safe have witnessed surprise upsets. Perhaps the most dramatic recent case was the 1996 election, in which the Maori seats, safe Labour seats for the previous 60 years, were all won by New Zealand First. Meanwhile, in the 2023 election, Labour lost many seats that they had held for decades prior such as Mount Roskill, Rongotai and Wellington Central.

The adoption of proportional representation by New Zealand, beginning in 1996, has decreased the importance of winning votes in geographical electorates. It remains to be seen what long-term effect proportional representation will have on the safety of individual electorate seats.

Examples of safe seats in New Zealand
Party	Current seats	Former seats
Labour	Dunedin; Kelston; Mana; Māngere; Manurewa; Mount Albert; Panmure-Ōtāhuhu	Avon; Grey Lynn; Island Bay; Manukau East; Onehunga; Papatoetoe; Sydenham
National	Botany; East Coast Bays; North Shore; Pakuranga; Selwyn; Southland; Taranaki-King Country	Albany; Fendalton; Karori; King Country; Pahiatua; Remuera; Wallace

== Philippines ==
While party-switching in the Philippines is rampant, certain congressional districts have been held by political families for generations. These are:

- Camarines Sur–4th: A Fuentebella has served in Congress since 1925. The Fuentebellas have held this district since its creation in 2010, held the 3rd district from 1992 to 2010, and the 2nd district from 1925 to 1972, except from 1931 to 1935, and from 1946 to 1953. A Fuentebella represented Bicol from 1978 to 1984.
- Cebu–5th: A Durano had held this seat until 2019 when they were defeated. Prior to redistricting, the Duranos held Cebu–1st since 1949. The Duranos have also held the mayorship of Danao, the largest city in the district, for generations.
- Isabela–1st: An Albano has held this seat since 1987. Prior to redistricting, an Albano has represented Isabela's at-large district or the Cagayan Valley from 1957 to 1986, except from 1965 to 1969.
- La Union–1st: An Ortega has held this seat since 1945 except for two instances, and continually since 1969.
- Tarlac–1st: A Cojuangco has held this seat from 1907 to 1909, from 1934 to 1946, and continually since 1961.

Under the usual definition, Capiz–1st has been held by the Liberal Party since 1946, except from 1953 to 1957; as the Liberals have not nominated someone in this district in the 2025 election, their domination of this district will end. Bohol's 3rd district has been held by the Nacionalista Party from 1912 to 1972.

== South Korea ==
From the 1960s, parliamentary constituencies in Gyeongsang region, especially Northern Gyeongbuk and Western Gyeongnam, are considered as safe seats for People Power Party.

City centres in Southeastern Gyeongnam, Southern Gyeogbuk and parliamentary constituencies in rural Gangwon, Chungbuk, Chungnam and Gyeonggi and affluent villages in such as Gangnam-gu, Seocho-gu, Songpa-gu and Yongsan-gu of Seoul, Haeundae-gu, Nam-gu, Dongnae-gu and Suyeong-gu of Busan are also considered as safe seats for People Power Party.

Parliamentary constituencies in industrial areas and built-up residential areas in Gyeonggi, Southeastern Gyeongnam, Cheongju – Daejeon – Sejong City and Jeolla regions such as Jeonbuk and Jeonnam are considered as safe seats for the Democratic Party.

== United Kingdom ==
Elections in the United Kingdom have long featured many seats that are consistently safe for the Conservative Party and Labour Party, although the increased political volatility since the mid-2010s has reduced the number of long-held safe seats and led to speculation that others could be lost as soon as the next general election.

Before the 2024 United Kingdom general election, analysis from the Electoral Reform Society estimated that the average constituency had been held for 45 years; 247 out of 650 (38.0%) had been held by the same party for over 50 years; and 111 (17.1%) had been held by the same party for over 100 years.

Several recent elections have reduced the number of long-held safe seats, in particular, the collapses of Scottish Labour in 2015 and of the Conservatives in 2024. In those cases, as with the Liberal Democrats collapse in 2015, the parties lost votes with a proportional swing, in which more voters were lost in the seats where they had been previously strongest. To a lesser extent, Labour lost long-held seats in the "Red Wall" in 2019, though others such as YouGov director Anthony Wells argued that Labour's decline in these constituencies represents a typical rather than exceptional trend of voter realignment. Despite their landslide victory in 2024, Labour's vote fell in many of its safest seats.

On 6 April 2010, the Electoral Reform Society (ERS) estimated that going into the 2010 general election, of the 650 constituencies, 382 (59%) were safe seats. Some of these seats have since been lost by the parties that held them at the time, notably most of the Liberal Democrat seats and some Labour seats, meaning they can no longer be considered "safe".

Party	Safe seats	% safe seats
Conservatives	172	45.03%
Labour	165	43.19%
Lib Dems	29	7.59%
SNP	3	0.79%
Plaid Cymru	2	0.52%
Northern Ireland parties	11	2.88%
Total	382	100%

Traditional safe seats for the Labour Party tend to be in major urban areas and the industrial centres, such as the North West (Liverpool, Manchester); the North East (Newcastle, Sunderland); South and West Yorkshire, the Valleys of South Wales; the Central Belt of Scotland, and the West Midlands county and parts of Inner London (e.g. Hackney and Newham).

Traditional safe seats for the Conservative Party tend to be in rural areas: the Home Counties (e.g. Surrey, Buckinghamshire), the shires (e.g. North Yorkshire and Cheshire) and affluent areas of London (e.g. Chelsea and Fulham).

The safest seat in the 2017 general election was Liverpool Walton, where Labour received 86% of the vote, giving them a 77% majority over the second-placed Conservatives (at 9%). Christchurch is a safe Conservative seat; in 2017 the party gathered 69.6% of the vote there, giving it a near-50% majority over Labour.

The ERS identifies what it calls "super safe seats", which have been held continuously by one party since the 19th century. In so doing, it equates seats with their rough equivalents under previous boundaries. For example, following the 2010 general election, it identifies the national representative of the area forming Haltemprice and Howden (drawn as a constituency in 1997) as having been a Conservative since the 1837 general election. Similarly, it considers that Wokingham (and a few others) have been held by the Conservative Party since 1885, Devon East, Fylde and Arundel and South Downs since 1868, Hampshire North East since 1857, and Rutland and Melton, Bognor Regis and Littlehampton, and East Worthing and Shoreham all since 1841. (For historical reasons, the Conservative Party being older than the other current main parties, it holds all the oldest safe seats.)

Safe seats of the governing party are more at risk in by-elections, since they commonly attract a protest vote against the government. For this reason, by-elections are often analysed separately from general elections.

Even the safest of seats can be – and sometimes are – upset in general elections. These cases can become historic moments: the defeat of Michael Portillo in 1997 created the "Portillo moment". That expression has since been used to describe huge voting swings that generally usher in a new government, as occurred in 1997. Similarly, in 2015, the Labour Party lost all but one of their seats in Scotland and many long-held safe seats, including Kirkcaldy and Cowdenbeath, which had previously been held by former Prime Minister Gordon Brown, and Paisley and Renfrewshire South, the seat of shadow Foreign Secretary Douglas Alexander. In both cases, swings of over 25% to the SNP were recorded. In the 2024 general election, safe seats lost included South West Norfolk, gained by Labour candidate Terry Jermy from former prime minister Liz Truss, along with twelve Cabinet ministers, the Father of the House, and some seats that had not changed parties since the 19th century (including Horsham, Wokingham, and North East Hampshire).

In general elections with smaller national swings, it is rare for the opposition to take safe seats, but outside candidates may be able to. Examples include Martin Bell in the safe Conservative seat of Tatton in 1997, Peter Law in Blaenau Gwent in 2005, and George Galloway in Bethnal Green and Bow that same year.

== United States ==
The Cook Partisan Voting Index rates congressional districts on how strongly they lean toward either major party. As of the 2022 redistricting, California's 12th district is the most Democratic at D+40, while Alabama's 4th district is the most Republican at R+33.

Democratic safe seats typically represent cities, especially in coastal western states and northeastern states. For example, California's 11th congressional district, which currently covers most of the city of San Francisco, is considered a safe seat for Democrats. This district and its predecessors have been in Democratic hands without interruption since 1949. Its current representative, former House Speaker Nancy Pelosi, was most recently reelected with 81.0 percent of the vote.

Safe Republican seats include Tennessee's 1st congressional district and Tennessee's 2nd congressional district, which are located in the eastern part of the state. Both districts have been held by Republicans or their predecessors (except for two terms in the 1st) since 1859. These districts elected some of the few truly senior Southern Republican Congressmen before the 1950s.

== See also ==
- Gerrymandering
- Rotten and pocket boroughs, corrupt types of safe seat in the United Kingdom prior to the Reform Act 1832
