= Sean Fraser (politician) =

Canadian politician (born 1984)

The Honourable Sean Fraser PC KC MP
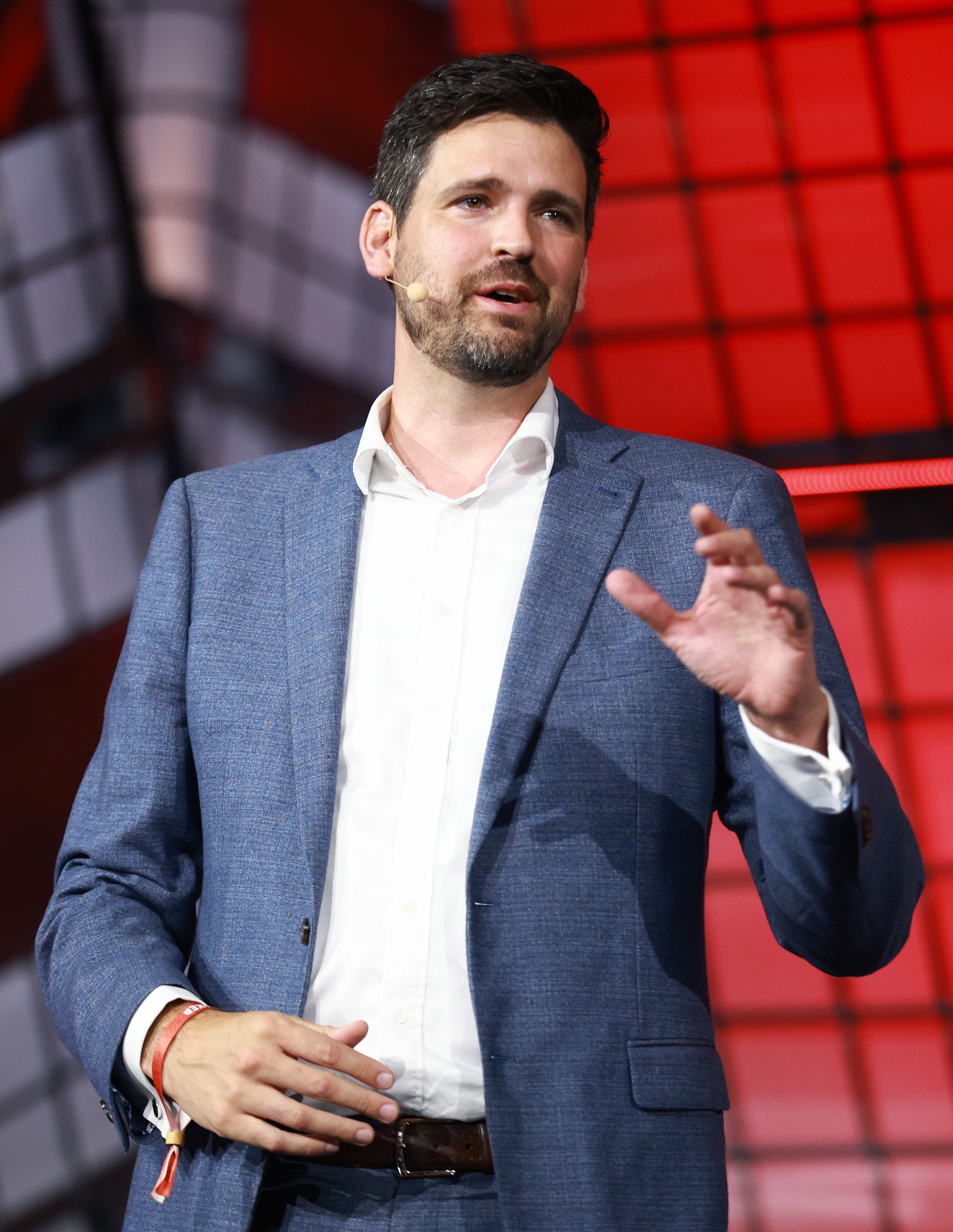
- Fraser in 2023

Minister of Justice Attorney General of Canada
- Incumbent
- Assumed office May 13, 2025
- Prime Minister: Mark Carney
- Preceded by: Gary Anandasangaree

Minister for the Atlantic Canada Opportunities Agency
- Incumbent
- Assumed office May 13, 2025
- Prime Minister: Mark Carney
- Preceded by: Gudie Hutchings

Minister of Housing, Infrastructure and Communities
- In office July 26, 2023 – December 20, 2024
- Prime Minister: Justin Trudeau
- Preceded by: Ahmed Hussen (Housing); Dominic LeBlanc (Infrastructure and Communities)
- Succeeded by: Nate Erskine-Smith

Minister of Immigration, Refugees and Citizenship
- In office October 26, 2021 – July 26, 2023
- Prime Minister: Justin Trudeau
- Preceded by: Marco Mendicino
- Succeeded by: Marc Miller

Parliamentary Secretary to the Minister of Finance
- In office December 12, 2019 – October 26, 2021
- Minister: Bill Morneau; Chrystia Freeland
- Preceded by: Joël Lightbound
- Succeeded by: Terry Beech

Parliamentary Secretary to the Minister of Middle Class Prosperity
- In office December 12, 2019 – October 26, 2021
- Minister: Mona Fortier
- Preceded by: Position established
- Succeeded by: Position abolished

Parliamentary Secretary to the Minister of Environment and Climate Change
- In office August 31, 2018 – September 11, 2019
- Minister: Catherine McKenna
- Preceded by: Jonathan Wilkinson
- Succeeded by: Peter Schiefke

Member of Parliament for Central Nova
- Incumbent
- Assumed office October 19, 2015
- Preceded by: Peter MacKay

Personal details
- Born: Sean Simon Andrew Fraser; June 1, 1984 (age 42) Antigonish, Nova Scotia, Canada
- Party: Liberal
- Spouse: Sarah Burton
- Children: 3
- Education: St. Francis Xavier University (BSc); Dalhousie University (JD); Leiden University (LLM)
- Profession: Lawyer

Sean Simon Andrew Fraser (born June 1, 1984) is a Canadian lawyer and politician who is the minister of justice and Attorney General of Canada. A member of the Liberal Party, Fraser has served as the member of Parliament (MP) for Central Nova since 2015. He joined Cabinet in 2021 as the minister of immigration, refugees and citizenship, and was the minister of housing, infrastructure and communities from 2023 to 2024. Fraser took on his current role in 2025 and concurrently minister for the Atlantic Canada Opportunities Agency.

== Early life and education ==
Born in Antigonish and raised in Merigomish in Pictou County, Nova Scotia, Fraser earned a Bachelor of Science at St. Francis Xavier University in 2006. He went on to earn a law degree from Dalhousie University and a master's degree in public international law from Leiden University in the Netherlands, graduating in 2009 and 2011 respectively.

== Legal career ==
He spent three years working in Calgary as an associate at Blake, Cassels & Graydon LLP, and also did work related to the Promotion of Access to Information Act for an NGO in South Africa.

== Political career ==
=== 41st Parliament of Canada ===
A Liberal, Fraser was elected for the federal riding of Central Nova in the 2015 federal election which saw the Liberals under Justin Trudeau win a majority government.

=== 42nd Parliament of Canada ===
From 2018 to 2019, Fraser served as parliamentary secretary to the Minister of Environment and Climate Change.

=== 43rd Parliament of Canada ===
From December 2019 to 2021 in the 43rd Parliament of Canada, Fraser served as parliamentary secretary to the Minister of Middle Class Prosperity and Minister of Finance (Canada).

=== 44th Parliament of Canada ===
On 26 October 2021, soon after his re-election to the 44th Parliament of Canada, Fraser was appointed Minister of Immigration, Refugees and Citizenship. In February 2022, Fraser tabled the 2022-2024 Immigration Levels Plan, which outlined a 1.14% growth in population per year, with increased targets surpassing 450,000 permanent residents by 2024. After Fraser's news release, the Century Initiative, released their statement, commending Fraser. In November of the same year, Fraser announced the government's plan to increase Canada's annual immigration target to 500,000 by 2025; Fraser cited labour shortages as the reason for the increase. Concerns over the effects higher immigration targets would have on health care, housing affordability and the labour market, were dismissed by Fraser, who explained some people, like international students, who had become permanent residents, were already living in the country. Further criticism arose when Radio-Canada revealed sources within Fraser's ministry said McKinsey & Company, which had received $100 million in consulting fees from the Liberal government, was influencing immigration policy. Fraser insisted he had not been influenced by McKinsey, and decided on the increase, independently.

In October 2022, the Fifth Estate reported on the exploitation of international students by private colleges. Fraser expressed his concern with these private colleges, and stated provincial governments could proceed with shutting them down without approval from the federal government.

Fraser was immigration minister when the Roxham Road migrant crisis peaked. After Quebec complained it was "unfairly shouldering the cost of taking care of asylum-seekers," crossing at the irregular port of entry, Fraser announced a "Pan-Canadian" solution to the crisis: the federal government would transfer thousands of migrants to Ontario towns, such as Niagara Falls, which was already having a housing crisis. Roxham Road closed in March 2023. The same month, the government proposed $1 billion for short-term accommodation and temporary health-care coverage for asylum-seekers and refugees.

On July 26, 2023, Fraser was appointed Minister of Housing, Infrastructure and Communities. After the population increased by over 430,000 in three months, the government was criticized for "having lost control". With international students, temporary foreign workers, and migrants, competing for social programs, jobs, housing and health care, Fraser stated the government would look at reforms to the international student program but "closing the doors to newcomers" was not the solution and developers needed "access to the labour force to build the houses they needed." A Canada Mortgage and Housing Corporation (CMHC) report showed the number of construction workers had hit an all-time high in 2023, but the industry's potential output was not met and structural changes were needed.

In 2022, when Fraser was the immigration minister, Canada's population growth was the highest of any G7 country. The population grew by 4.7 people for every housing unit completed the previous year. In 2023, after homelessness in Halifax, Nova Scotia doubled in one year, and Toronto and Hamilton, Ontario declared homelessness an emergency, Fraser announced $100 million towards emergency winter funding to support communities in their response to homelessness. In February 2024, Fraser stated homelessness was not a policy failure but a "generational moral failure," Canadians share.

In March 2024, the federal government negotiated deals with municipalities to add 750,000 homes to Canada's housing supply in the next decade, to be paid through the Housing Accelerator Fund, at a cost of $4 billion. In April 2024, the Liberals unveiled their plan to build 3.9 million homes by 2031 to solve the housing crisis. The CMHC estimates nearly six million new homes are needed by 2030. On 25 August 2024, Fraser announced the government's intention to offer 99-year leases of government lands for the purpose of affordable housing.

In December 2024, Fraser announced he would leave federal cabinet during the next cabinet shuffle. Fraser also announced he would not seek re-election. On January 21, 2025, he endorsed former Bank of Canada governor Mark Carney in the upcoming 2025 Liberal leadership election. Carney subsequently asked Fraser to reconsider his decision to retire from the House of Commons, and on March 25 he announced that he would seek a fourth term, replacing Graham Murray as the Liberal candidate.

At the time of the 2025 Canadian federal election, he lived in New Glasgow.

=== 45th Parliament of Canada ===
Fraser was sworn in as Minister of Justice and Attorney General of Canada as well as Minister responsible for the Atlantic Canada Opportunities Agency.

== Awards ==
In January 2021 Fraser was selected as "Best Orator" and was a finalist for "Rising Star" during the 12th annual Maclean's Parliamentarians of the Year Awards.

== Electoral record ==
2025 Canadian federal election: Central Nova
Party	Candidate	Votes	%	±%	Expenditures
Liberal	Sean Fraser	26,078	51.93	+7.88	$110,875.30
Conservative	Brycen Jenkins	21,465	42.75	+10.09	$107,945.03
New Democratic	Jesiah MacDonald	1,649	3.28	-12.77	$721.79
Green	Gerald Romsa	455	0.91	-0.60	$9,882.48
People's	Charlie MacEachern	331	0.66	-3.31	$18.03
Independent	Alexander MacKenzie	235	0.47	N/A	none listed
Total valid votes/expense limit		50,213	99.32	–0.10	$126,350.73
Total rejected ballots		346	0.68	+0.10	
Turnout		50,559	75.32		
Eligible voters (Note: Number of eligible voters does not include election day registrations.)		67,122			
Liberal hold		Swing		-1.11	
Source: Elections Canada

2021 Canadian federal election: Central Nova
Party	Candidate	Votes	%	±%	Expenditures
Liberal	Sean Fraser	18,682	46.16	-0.43	$88,208.43
Conservative	Steven Cotter	13,060	32.27	+2.58	$38,393.01
New Democratic	Betsy MacDonald	6,225	15.38	+2.32	$11,093.54
People's	Al Muir	1,445	3.57	+1.46	$0.00
Green	Katerina Nikas	494	1.22	-6.60	$0.00
Independent	Harvey Henderson	365	0.90	N/A	$0.00
Communist	Chris Frazer	138	0.34	-0.06	$0.00
Rhinoceros	Ryan Smyth	65	0.16	N/A	$0.00
Total valid votes/expense limit		40,474	99.42		$107,714.33
Total rejected ballots		236	0.58	-0.34	
Turnout		40,710	65.46	-8.17	
Registered voters		62,193			
Liberal hold		Swing		-1.51	
Source: Elections Canada

2019 Canadian federal election: Central Nova
Party	Candidate	Votes	%	±%	Expenditures
Liberal	Sean Fraser	20,718	46.59	−11.94	$99,263.87
Conservative	George Canyon	13,201	29.69	+3.89	$89,511.25
New Democratic	Betsy MacDonald	5,806	13.06	+2.82	none listed
Green	Barry Randle	3,478	7.82	+3.68	$6,467.76
People's	Al Muir	938	2.11	New	$2,862.69
Communist	Chris Frazer	180	0.40	New	$749.95
Independent	Michael Slowik	149	0.33	New	$0.00
Total valid votes/expense limit		44,470	100.0		$102,724.82
Total rejected ballots		412	0.92	+0.40	
Turnout		44,882	74.49	−0.19	
Eligible voters		60,251			
Liberal hold		Swing		−7.92	
Source: Elections Canada

2015 Canadian federal election: Central Nova
Party	Candidate	Votes	%	±%	Expenditures
Liberal	Sean Fraser	25,909	58.53	+44.58	$113,362.49
Conservative	Fred DeLorey	11,418	25.80	–29.49	$109,137.26
New Democratic	Ross Landry	4,532	10.24	–16.57	$63,038.54
Green	David Hachey	1,834	4.14	+0.34	$11,206.15
Independent	Alexander J. MacKenzie	570	1.29	–	–
Total valid votes/expense limit		44,263	100.00		$204,540.28
Total rejected ballots		233	0.52		
Turnout		44,496	74.68		
Eligible voters		59,585			
Liberal gain from Conservative		Swing		+37.04	
Source: Elections Canada

Order of precedence
Preceded by Marc Miller as Member of the Cabinet	Order of Precedence of Canada as Member of the Cabinet	Succeeded by Gary Anandasangaree as Member of the Cabinet
