= Elmer MacKay =

Canadian politician (1936–2026)

The Honourable Elmer MacKay PC KC

44th Minister of Public Works
- In office January 30, 1989 – June 25, 1993
- Prime Minister: Brian Mulroney
- Preceded by: Otto Jelinek (acting)
- Succeeded by: Paul Wyatt Dick

2nd Minister for the Atlantic Canada Opportunities Agency
- In office January 30, 1989 – April 21, 1991
- Prime Minister: Brian Mulroney
- Preceded by: Gerald Merrithew
- Succeeded by: John Crosbie

27th Minister of National Revenue
- In office August 20, 1985 – January 30, 1989
- Prime Minister: Brian Mulroney
- Preceded by: Perrin Beatty
- Succeeded by: Otto Jelinek

31st Solicitor General of Canada
- In office September 17, 1984 – August 20, 1985
- Prime Minister: Brian Mulroney
- Preceded by: Robert Phillip Kaplan
- Succeeded by: Perrin Beatty

4th Minister of Regional Economic Expansion
- In office June 4, 1979 – March 3, 1980
- Prime Minister: Joe Clark
- Preceded by: Marcel Lessard
- Succeeded by: Pierre de Bané

Member of Parliament for Central Nova
- In office September 4, 1984 – October 25, 1993
- Preceded by: Brian Mulroney
- Succeeded by: Roseanne Skoke
- In office May 31, 1971 – June 15, 1983
- Preceded by: Russell MacEwan
- Succeeded by: Brian Mulroney

Personal details
- Born: Elmer MacIntosh MacKay; August 5, 1936 Hopewell, Nova Scotia, Canada
- Died: July 24, 2026 (aged 89)
- Party: Conservative
- Other political affiliations: Progressive Conservative (until 2003)
- Spouse(s): Eirene Macha Delap (m. 1961; div. 1973) Sharon MacKay
- Children: 5, including Peter MacKay
- Education: Acadia University (BA); Dalhousie University (LLB)
- Profession: Lawyer

Elmer MacIntosh MacKay PC KC (August 5, 1936 – July 24, 2026) was a Canadian politician. He was the Member of Parliament (MP) for the riding of Central Nova from 1971 to 1983, and from 1984 to 1993. A member of the Progressive Conservative (PC) caucus, he served as cabinet minister under prime ministers Joe Clark and Brian Mulroney.

== Early life and career ==
MacKay was born in Hopewell, Nova Scotia on August 5, 1936, the son of Laura Louise (Macintosh) and Gordon Barclay MacKay. He attended Acadia University and Dalhousie University, and was called to the bar of Nova Scotia in 1961. He founded Beaver Lumber Company Limited in 1963, and also owned Lorne Resources Company Limited.

Following the 1971 resignation of Central Nova MP Russell MacEwan, MacKay ran in the ensuing by-election as the Progressive Conservative candidate, and was elected to the House of Commons of Canada. He was re-elected in 1972 and 1974, and served variously as the PC critic on regional development, transport, the Cape Breton Development Corporation, and the Solicitor General, as well as PC caucus chair from 1976.

The PCs formed a minority government following the 1979 election, and the re-elected MacKay was named Minister of Regional Economic Expansion in the short-lived cabinet of Prime Minister Joe Clark, serving until the PCs lost power in 1980. He kept his parliamentary seat in that year's election, but resigned in 1983 to allow newly elected PC leader Brian Mulroney to enter Parliament through a by-election in Central Nova.

Mulroney ran in his home riding of Manicouagan, Quebec, in the 1984 election, and MacKay was again returned to the House as Central Nova's MP. The PCs won a majority government in that election, and MacKay was appointed to the Mulroney cabinet, serving as Solicitor General before becoming Minister of National Revenue in August 1985.

MacKay was re-elected in 1988, and became Minister of Public Works and Minister for the purposes of the Atlantic Canada Opportunities Agency Act (ACOA) in January 1989. The opposition Liberals and New Democratic Party often accused MacKay of giving patronage appointments; while no wrongdoing was ever proven, MacKay was removed from the ACOA portfolio in 1991. He remained Public Works minister from 1991 to 1993, and was given responsibility for the Canada Mortgage and Housing Corporation.

Kim Campbell replaced Mulroney as prime minister in June 1993, which saw MacKay stepping down as cabinet minister; he did not run in that October's federal election. He served as honorary campaign chair to Cecil Clarke during the 2018 Nova Scotia PC leadership election.

== Personal life and death ==
MacKay was married to Eirene Macha Delap; the two divorced in 1973, and Macha died in 2017. His wife until his death was Sharon.

Among his children is Peter MacKay, who served as a PC and Conservative MP from 1997 to 2015. Initially he represented Pictou—Antigonish—Guysborough, which was formed from Elmer's former Central Nova riding; from 2004 he represented the reconstituted Central Nova. Like Elmer, Peter served as minister responsible for ACOA, and for Prince Edward Island. Peter also served as the final leader of the Progressive Conservative Party of Canada before it merged with the Canadian Alliance into the present-day Conservative Party.

MacKay died on July 24, 2026, at the age of 89.

== Controversy ==
MacKay was a longtime associate of onetime Prime Minister Brian Mulroney and German businessman Karlheinz Schreiber, who were negotiating the purchase of Airbus aircraft for Air Canada in 1988. As a result of subsequent Royal Canadian Mounted Police charges against Mulroney for accepting kickbacks on this transaction, a federal inquiry was launched, which found that Mulroney had accepted at least $300,000 in cash from Schreiber after the transaction. Mulroney's defence stated these payments were in return for consulting services. Documents show that MacKay drafted a letter that was eventually released by Schreiber as evidence that Scheiber's and Mulroney's business dealings were legitimate. It is not known why MacKay drafted a letter that was later offered as evidence and supposedly written by Schreiber.

Evidence tabled at the Airbus inquiry included entries in Schreiber's diary that indicated Schreiber had made phone calls to MacKay on the same dates during which the first two Airbus meetings were held between Mulroney and Schreiber. MacKay confirmed he had had lunch with Mulroney and Schreiber the day of the third meeting. In addition, Schreiber’s diary shows he made phone calls to MacKay on two days in July 1993 when he made banking transactions in Switzerland to obtain money to pay Mulroney.

Although MacKay was closely involved with Mulroney and Schreiber during the time of the Airbus purchases, he was never formally charged for wrongdoing in the scandal.

== Electoral history ==
1988 Canadian federal election: Central Nova
Party	Candidate	Votes	%	±%
Progressive Conservative	Elmer MacKay	19,065	48.58	-12.42
Liberal	Marion Anderson	15,066	38.39	+12.39
New Democratic	Gloria Murphy	5,110	13.02	+0.02
Total valid votes		39,241	100.00	

1984 Canadian federal election: Central Nova
Party	Candidate	Votes	%	±%
Progressive Conservative	Elmer MacKay	21,462	61.00	+0.81
Liberal	Al Lomas	9,148	26.00	+0.95
New Democratic	Gloria E. Murphy	4,572	13.00	-0.39
Total valid votes		35,182	100.00	

1980 Canadian federal election: Central Nova
Party	Candidate	Votes	%	±%
Progressive Conservative	Elmer MacKay	15,576	48.03	-8.55
Liberal	Alvin Sinclair	11,111	34.26	+4.37
New Democratic	Gary A. Chambers	5,743	17.71	+4.18
Total valid votes		32,430	100.00	
lop.parl.ca

1979 Canadian federal election: Central Nova
Party	Candidate	Votes	%	±%
Progressive Conservative	Elmer MacKay	18,907	56.58	+2.65
Liberal	Lloyd P. Mackay	9,988	29.89	-6.41
New Democratic	Gary A. Chambers	4,521	13.53	+4.67
Total valid votes		33,416	100.00	

1974 Canadian federal election: Central Nova
Party	Candidate	Votes	%	±%
Progressive Conservative	Elmer MacKay	17,459	53.93	-3.02
Liberal	Fern Dunn	11,753	36.30	+7.33
New Democratic	John Rod Brown	2,869	8.86	-3.98
Social Credit	John J. Henderson	292	0.90	-0.34
Total valid votes		32,373	100.00	

1972 Canadian federal election: Central Nova
Party	Candidate	Votes	%	±%
Progressive Conservative	Elmer MacKay	18,259	56.95	+4.37
Liberal	D. Laurence Mawhinney	9,288	28.97	-9.37
New Democratic	John Rod Brown	4,117	12.84	+6.20
Social Credit	John J. Henderson	397	1.24	-1.20
Total valid votes		32,061	100.00	

21st Canadian Ministry (1979–1980) – Cabinet of Joe Clark
Cabinet post (1)
Predecessor	Office	Successor
Marcel Lessard	Minister of Regional Economic Expansion; 1979–1980	Pierre De Bané
