= Roseanne Skoke =

Canadian politician

Member of Parliament for Central Nova
- In office October 25, 1993 – June 2, 1997
- Preceded by: Elmer MacKay
- Succeeded by: Riding dissolved

Personal details
- Born: September 11, 1954 (age 71) New Glasgow, Nova Scotia, Canada
- Party: Liberal

Roseanne Skoke (born September 11, 1954) was the Liberal MP for the riding of Central Nova from 1993 to 1997.

== Political career ==
Central Nova had been considered a safe Progressive Conservative riding, but its popular MP, Elmer MacKay, did not run for reelection in 1993. Skoke was elected in the gigantic Liberal landslide of that year as the party swept Nova Scotia and won all but one seat in the Atlantic provinces.

She was one of the more socially conservative members of the Liberal caucus, drawing great controversy for her remarks on homosexuality in 1995, calling it "unnatural and immoral."

Due to redistribution prior to the 1997 federal election, Skoke was forced to run against fellow Liberal MP Francis LeBlanc for the Liberal nomination in her riding, which was renamed Pictou—Antigonish—Guysborough. She was defeated due, in part, to controversies surrounding her. She refused to campaign for LeBlanc in the 1997 election leading some Liberals to blame her for LeBlanc's defeat at the hands of Peter MacKay.

Skoke attempted a political comeback by running for the leadership of the Nova Scotia Liberal Party later that year. She placed third.

In 1998, she unsuccessfully attempted to win a seat in the Nova Scotia House of Assembly by running against John Hamm in Pictou Centre during the provincial election.

== Legal cases ==
In the 1980s, she was one of six people charged and convicted for disturbing an act of solemnity during a service of religious worship after she insisted on kneeling for communion at her Catholic church. Those convictions were later overturned in the Supreme Court of Canada.

In October 2015, she began a private lawsuit against the bishop and Diocese of Antigonish after the diocese announced the coming closure of Our Lady of Lourdes church.

== Electoral history ==
1993 Canadian federal election: Central Nova
Party	Candidate	Votes	%	±%
Liberal	Roseanne Skoke	16,399	43.61	+5.22
Progressive Conservative	Ken Streatch	11,916	31.69	-16.89
Reform	Howard Mackinnon	6,068	16.14	
New Democratic	Hugh Mackenzie	2,446	6.50	-6.52
National	Gerard W. Horgan	511	1.36	
Natural Law	Pulkesh Lakhanpal	266	0.71	
Total valid votes		37,606	100.00	
