= Minister of Middle Class Prosperity =

Defunct Canadian Cabinet position

- Ministre de la Prospérité de la Classe Moyenne
- Incumbent; Vacant
- Department of Finance
- Style: The Honourable
- Member of: Parliament; Privy Council; Cabinet
- Reports to: Parliament; Prime Minister
- Appointer: Monarch (represented by the governor general); on the advice of the prime minister
- Term length: At His Majesty's pleasure
- Formation: November 20, 2019
- First holder: Mona Fortier
- Final holder: Mona Fortier
- Abolished: October 26, 2021
- Salary: CA$269,800 (2019)
- Website: fin.canada.ca

The minister of middle class prosperity (French: ministre de la prospérité de la classe moyenne) was a member of the Canadian Cabinet who was responsible for various files within the Department of Finance Canada as assigned by the minister of finance.

Mona Fortier was the first and only minister, serving from November 20, 2019 to October 26, 2021. She was concurrently the associate minister of finance.

This portfolio was introduced under Prime Minister Justin Trudeau following the 2019 election and fell into disuse following the 2021 election.

== Criticism of role ==
The creation of the cabinet post was widely criticized and mocked due to not appearing to have a clear mandate, and the minister failing to define what the middle class was when challenged.

== List of ministers ==
Minister	Tenure		Prime Minister
Mona Fortier	November 20, 2019	October 26, 2021	J. Trudeau (29)
