= Central Nova =

Federal electoral district in Nova Scotia, Canada

Nova Scotia electoral district
- Interactive map of riding boundaries from the 2025 federal election

Federal electoral district
- Legislature: House of Commons
MP
Sean Fraser
Liberal
- District created: 1966
- First contested: 1968
- Last contested: 2025
- District webpage: profile, map

Demographics
- Population (2016): 71,962
- Electors (2025): 66,808
- Area (km²): 9,308
- Pop. density (per km²): 7.7
- Census division(s): Antigonish; Guysborough; Halifax; Pictou
- Census subdivision(s): Halifax (part), Pictou, New Glasgow, Stellarton, Westville, Pictou, Trenton, St. Mary's, Fisher's Grant, Beaver Lake

Central Nova (French: Nova-Centre) is a federal electoral district in Nova Scotia, Canada that was represented in the House of Commons of Canada from 1968 until 1996. In 1996, Antigonish County and part of Guysborough County were placed with Pictou County in a new electoral boundaries configuration to form the electoral district of Pictou-Antigonish-Guysborough. A new version of Central Nova was established in 2003 and — in conjunction with the Pictou-Antigonish-Guysborough iteration — represented a significant electoral boundaries change with specific reference to Antigonish County. Between 1867 and 1997, Antigonish County was not in a riding that included Pictou County; rather, it comprised either its own electoral district (Antigonish), or part of other districts shared with Eastern Nova Scotia (Antigonish-Guysborough) and Cape Breton Island communities (Cape Breton Highlands Canso, 1968–1997). In 2013, part of Antigonish County was "placed back" with communities in the electoral district of Cape Breton Canso, a riding which had emerged in part from the former Cape Breton Highlands Canso riding in 1996. The current version of Central Nova includes Pictou County, parts of Antigonish and Guysborough Counties (including the Town of Antigonish and the Municipality of the District of St. Mary's) and extends into Halifax Regional Municipality.

== Demographics ==
Historical population
Year	Pop.	±%
2001	74,445	—
2006	72,966	−2.0%
2011 (2003 redist.)	72,114	−1.2%
2011 (2015 redist.)	74,597	+3.4%
2016	71,962	−3.5%

According to the 2021 Canadian census, 2023 representation order

Languages: 96.6% English, 1.8% French
Race: 91.7% White, 4.6% Indigenous, 1.8% Black
Religions: 62.1% Christian (23.0% Catholic, 10.2% United Church, 9.5% Anglican, 8.3% Presbyterian, 3.2% Baptist, 1.5% Methodist, 1.1% Pentecostal, 8.0% other), 36.7% none
Median income: $38,000 (2020)
Average income: $44,400 (2020)

== Geography ==
The district covers all or part of the following counties:

- Pictou County (all)
- Antigonish County (part)
- Guysborough County (part)
- Halifax County (part)

Specifically, it includes the following municipal corporations:

- Municipality of the County of Pictou
- The towns of New Glasgow, Stellarton, Pictou, Westville, Trenton, and Antigonish
- Municipality of the County of Antigonish
- Municipality of the District of St. Mary's
- Halifax Regional Municipality (east of Jeddore Oyster Pond and Marinette).

Communities include:

Pictou County

- New Glasgow
- Stellarton
- Westville
- Trenton
- Pictou
- River John

Antigonish County (as part of the county portion placed in Central Nova)

- Antigonish

Guysborough County (as part of the county portion placed in Central Nova)

- Goshen
- Sherbrooke
- Trafalgar
- Marie Joseph

Halifax County (as part of the county portion placed in Central Nova)

- Sheet Harbour
- Port Dufferin
- Lake Charlotte
- Jeddore Oyster Pond

The electoral district has an area of 8,439 km^{2}.

== Political geography ==
In 2008, the riding had the unusual scenario of having Green Party leader Elizabeth May run without any Liberal opposition. Thus, the race was mostly between Conservative candidate Peter MacKay and May. May's support was concentrated in the community of Antigonish. Outside this area, she won just a few pockets of support. She was nearly shut out in the New Glasgow metropolitan area, where she won just one poll. MacKay won most of the rest of the riding, and the NDP picked up three polls.

== History ==
The district was created in 1966 from Antigonish—Guysborough (with part of Guysborough added to Central Nova, while Antigonish County and a portion of Guysborough were placed with the Cape Breton Highlands Canso riding), Colchester—Hants, and Pictou. In sum, in 1966, Central Nova consisted of Pictou County, southern Colchester County, eastern Halifax County, and western Guysborough County. In 1976, it gained some territory in Halifax County (eastern central portion), and it lost its territory in Colchester County. In 1987, it lost most of Guysborough County except for the most extreme western point, and gained all of central and central western Halifax County. In 1996, it was merged into Pictou—Antigonish—Guysborough, and Sackville—Eastern Shore.

The electoral district was re-created in 2003: 93.3% of the riding came from Pictou—Antigonish—Guysborough riding, and 6.7% came from Sackville—Musquodoboit Valley—Eastern Shore. In the 2004 election, Conservative Party candidate Peter MacKay, who had represented Pictou—Antigonish—Guysborough, was returned to the House of Commons from Central Nova. He was re-elected in the 2006 election.

Green Party leader Elizabeth May contested the seat in the 2008 federal election. In a move that startled political observers, Liberal leader Stéphane Dion announced on April 13, 2007, that his party would not contest the seat in order to give May a better chance of winning, a move that marked the first time in decades that the Liberals did not field a full slate of candidates in a general election. In return, the Greens (who also fielded a full slate in the last election) did not contest Dion's Montreal riding. After coming in second to Peter MacKay, May announced she would not run in Central Nova in the next federal election.

Its new boundaries, determined during 2012 federal electoral boundaries redistribution, have been legally defined in the 2013 representation order. The new boundaries encompass most of the pre-2012 riding as well as a portion of Nova Scotia represented in the current electoral districts of Cumberland—Colchester—Musquodoboit Valley and Sackville—Eastern Shore. It lost 9% of its previous territory to Cape Breton—Canso, territory that, for decades prior to this, had already been part of Cape Breton Highlands Canso. It came into effect upon the call of the 42nd Canadian federal election, which took place on 19 October 2015.

Following the 2022 Canadian federal electoral redistribution, the riding lost the remainder of Antigonish County to Cape Breton—Canso—Antigonish and gained Lawrencetown, Porters Lake and Chezzetcook from Sackville—Preston—Chezzetcook. These changes will came into effect upon the calling of the 2025 Canadian federal election.

== Members of Parliament ==
This riding has elected the following members of Parliament:

Parliament	Years	Member	Party
Central Nova; Riding created from Antigonish—Guysborough, Colchester—Hants and Pictou
28th	1968–1971	Russell MacEwan	Progressive Conservative
28th	1971–1972	Elmer MacKay	Progressive Conservative
29th	1972–1974	Elmer MacKay	Progressive Conservative
30th	1974–1979	Elmer MacKay	Progressive Conservative
31st	1979–1980	Elmer MacKay	Progressive Conservative
32nd	1980–1983	Elmer MacKay	Progressive Conservative
32nd	1983–1984	Brian Mulroney	Progressive Conservative
33rd	1984–1988	Elmer MacKay	Progressive Conservative
34th	1988–1993	Elmer MacKay	Progressive Conservative
35th	1993–1997	Roseanne Skoke	Liberal
Riding dissolved into Pictou—Antigonish—Guysborough and Sackville—Eastern Shore
Riding re-created from Pictou—Antigonish—Guysborough and Sackville—Musquodoboit Valley—Eastern Shore
38th	2004–2006	Peter MacKay	Conservative
39th	2006–2008	Peter MacKay	Conservative
40th	2008–2011	Peter MacKay	Conservative
41st	2011–2015	Peter MacKay	Conservative
42nd	2015–2019	Sean Fraser	Liberal
43rd	2019–2021	Sean Fraser	Liberal
44th	2021–2025	Sean Fraser	Liberal
45th	2025–present	Sean Fraser	Liberal

== Election results ==
=== 2025 ===
2025 Canadian federal election
Party	Candidate	Votes	%	±%	Expenditures
Liberal	Sean Fraser	26,078	51.93	+7.88	$110,875.30
Conservative	Brycen Jenkins	21,465	42.75	+10.09	$107,945.03
New Democratic	Jesiah MacDonald	1,649	3.28	-12.77	$721.79
Green	Gerald Romsa	455	0.91	-0.60	$9,882.48
People's	Charlie MacEachern	331	0.66	-3.31	$18.03
Independent	Alexander MacKenzie	235	0.47	N/A	none listed
Total valid votes/expense limit		50,213	99.32	–0.10	$126,350.73
Total rejected ballots		346	0.68	+0.10	
Turnout		50,559	75.32		
Eligible voters (Note: Number of eligible voters does not include election day registrations.)		67,122			
Liberal hold		Swing		-1.11	
Source: Elections Canada

=== 2021 ===
2021 federal election redistributed results
Party	Vote	%
Liberal	18,031	44.30
Conservative	13,370	32.85
New Democratic	6,572	16.15
People's	1,624	3.99
Green	620	1.52
Others	484	1.19

2021 Canadian federal election
Party	Candidate	Votes	%	±%	Expenditures
Liberal	Sean Fraser	18,682	46.16	-0.43	$88,208.43
Conservative	Steven Cotter	13,060	32.27	+2.58	$38,393.01
New Democratic	Betsy MacDonald	6,225	15.38	+2.32	$11,093.54
People's	Al Muir	1,445	3.57	+1.46	$0.00
Green	Katerina Nikas	494	1.22	-6.60	$0.00
Independent	Harvey Henderson	365	0.90	N/A	$0.00
Communist	Chris Frazer	138	0.34	-0.06	$0.00
Rhinoceros	Ryan Smyth	65	0.16	N/A	$0.00
Total valid votes/expense limit		40,474	99.42		$107,714.33
Total rejected ballots		236	0.58	-0.34	
Turnout		40,710	65.46	-8.17	
Registered voters		62,193			
Liberal hold		Swing		-1.51	
Source: Elections Canada

=== 2019 ===
2019 Canadian federal election
Party	Candidate	Votes	%	±%	Expenditures
Liberal	Sean Fraser	20,718	46.59	−11.94	$99,263.87
Conservative	George Canyon	13,201	29.69	+3.89	$89,511.25
New Democratic	Betsy MacDonald	5,806	13.06	+2.82	none listed
Green	Barry Randle	3,478	7.82	+3.68	$6,467.76
People's	Al Muir	938	2.11	New	$2,862.69
Communist	Chris Frazer	180	0.40	New	$749.95
Independent	Michael Slowik	149	0.33	New	$0.00
Total valid votes/expense limit		44,470	100.0		$102,724.82
Total rejected ballots		412	0.92	+0.40	
Turnout		44,882	74.49	−0.19	
Eligible voters		60,251			
Liberal hold		Swing		−7.92	
Source: Elections Canada

=== 2015 ===
2015 Canadian federal election
Party	Candidate	Votes	%	±%	Expenditures
Liberal	Sean Fraser	25,909	58.53	+44.58	$113,362.49
Conservative	Fred DeLorey	11,418	25.80	–29.49	$109,137.26
New Democratic	Ross Landry	4,532	10.24	–16.57	$63,038.54
Green	David Hachey	1,834	4.14	+0.34	$11,206.15
Independent	Alexander J. MacKenzie	570	1.29	–	–
Total valid votes/expense limit		44,263	100.00		$204,540.28
Total rejected ballots		233	0.52		
Turnout		44,496	74.68		
Eligible voters		59,585			
Liberal gain from Conservative		Swing		+37.04	
Source: Elections Canada

2011 federal election redistributed results
Party	Vote	%
Conservative	21,494	55.29
New Democratic	10,422	26.81
Liberal	5,424	13.95
Green	1,479	3.80
Others	57	0.15

=== 2011 ===
2011 Canadian federal election
Party	Candidate	Votes	%	±%	Expenditures
Conservative	Peter MacKay	21,593	56.79	+10.19	$66,993.75
New Democratic	David Parker	9,412	24.75	+5.19	$22,391.41
Liberal	John Hamilton	5,614	14.76	–	$38,162.02
Green	Matthew Chisholm	1,406	3.70	-28.54	$3,941.29
Total valid votes/expense limit		38,025	100.0		$83,138.94
Total rejected, unmarked and declined ballots		226	0.59	-0.18	
Turnout		38,251	65.00	-2.01	
Eligible voters		57,963			
Conservative hold		Swing		+2.50	

=== 2008 ===
2008 Canadian federal election
Party	Candidate	Votes	%	±%	Expenditures
Conservative	Peter MacKay	18,240	46.60	+5.94	$61,468.89
Green	Elizabeth May	12,620	32.24	+30.65	$57,490.60
New Democratic	Louise Lorifice	7,659	19.56	-13.33	$39,917.36
Christian Heritage	Michael Harris MacKay	427	1.09	–	none listed
Canadian Action	Paul Kemp	196	0.50	–	$87.79
Total valid votes/expense limit		39,142	100.0		$80,462
Total rejected, unmarked and declined ballots		304	0.77	+0.42	
Turnout		39,446	67.01	-2.16	
Eligible voters		58,863			
Conservative hold		Swing		-24.71	

=== 2006 ===
2006 Canadian federal election
Party	Candidate	Votes	%	±%	Expenditures
Conservative	Peter MacKay	17,134	40.66	-2.61	$55,938.56
New Democratic	Alexis MacDonald	13,861	32.89	+5.23	$28,582.28
Liberal	Dan Walsh	10,349	24.56	-1.83	$43,064.69
Green	David Orton	671	1.59	-1.09	$901.04
Marxist–Leninist	Allan H. Bezanson	124	0.29	–	none listed
Total valid votes/expense limit		42,139	100.0		$75,651
Total rejected, unmarked and declined ballots		147	0.35	-0.17	
Turnout		42,286	69.17	+3.85	
Eligible voters		61,137			
Conservative hold		Swing		-3.92	

=== 2004 ===
2004 Canadian federal election
Party	Candidate	Votes	%	±%	Expenditures
Conservative	Peter MacKay	16,376	43.27	-8.13	$53,745.97
New Democratic	Alexis MacDonald	10,470	27.66	+14.84	$25,231.91
Liberal	Susan Green	9,986	26.39	-3.95	$44,229.04
Green	Rebecca Mosher	1,015	2.68	–	$222.50
Total valid votes/expense limit		37,847	100.0		$73,053
Total rejected, unmarked and declined ballots		198	0.52		
Turnout		38,045	65.32	-0.92	
Eligible voters		58,240			
Conservative notional gain from Progressive Conservative		Swing		-11.48	
Changes from 2000 are based on redistributed results. Conservative Party change is based on the combination of Canadian Alliance and Progressive Conservative Party totals.

2000 federal election redistributed results
Party	Vote	%
Progressive Conservative	17,969	47.53
Liberal	11,471	30.34
New Democratic	4,845	12.82
Alliance	2,976	7.87
Others	541	1.43

=== 1993 ===
1993 Canadian federal election
Party	Candidate	Votes	%	±%
Liberal	Roseanne Skoke	16,399	43.61	+5.22
Progressive Conservative	Ken Streatch	11,916	31.69	-16.89
Reform	Howard Mackinnon	6,068	16.14	
New Democratic	Hugh Mackenzie	2,446	6.50	-6.52
National	Gerard W. Horgan	511	1.36	
Natural Law	Pulkesh Lakhanpal	266	0.71	
Total valid votes		37,606	100.00	

=== 1988 ===
1988 Canadian federal election
Party	Candidate	Votes	%	±%
Progressive Conservative	Elmer MacKay	19,065	48.58	-12.42
Liberal	Marion Anderson	15,066	38.39	+12.39
New Democratic	Gloria Murphy	5,110	13.02	+0.02
Total valid votes		39,241	100.00	

=== 1984 ===
1984 Canadian federal election
Party	Candidate	Votes	%	±%
Progressive Conservative	Elmer MacKay	21,462	61.00	+0.81
Liberal	Al Lomas	9,148	26.00	+0.95
New Democratic	Gloria E. Murphy	4,572	13.00	-0.39
Total valid votes		35,182	100.00	

=== 1983 by-election ===
Canadian federal by-election, 29 August 1983 On the resignation of Elmer MacKay, 15 June 1983
Party	Candidate	Votes	%	±%
Progressive Conservative	Brian Mulroney	18,882	60.19	+12.16
Liberal	Alvin Sinclair	7,858	25.05	-9.21
New Democratic	Roy G. Demarsh	4,202	13.39	-4.32
Independent	Anne McBride	287	0.91	
Independent	Bob Robert Kirk	97	0.31	
Independent	John Turmel	46	0.15	
Total valid votes		31,372	100.00	

=== 1980 ===
1980 Canadian federal election
Party	Candidate	Votes	%	±%
Progressive Conservative	Elmer MacKay	15,576	48.03	-8.55
Liberal	Alvin Sinclair	11,111	34.26	+4.37
New Democratic	Gary A. Chambers	5,743	17.71	+4.18
Total valid votes		32,430	100.00	
lop.parl.ca

=== 1979 ===
1979 Canadian federal election
Party	Candidate	Votes	%	±%
Progressive Conservative	Elmer MacKay	18,907	56.58	+2.65
Liberal	Lloyd P. Mackay	9,988	29.89	-6.41
New Democratic	Gary A. Chambers	4,521	13.53	+4.67
Total valid votes		33,416	100.00	

=== 1974 ===
1974 Canadian federal election
Party	Candidate	Votes	%	±%
Progressive Conservative	Elmer MacKay	17,459	53.93	-3.02
Liberal	Fern Dunn	11,753	36.30	+7.33
New Democratic	John Rod Brown	2,869	8.86	-3.98
Social Credit	John J. Henderson	292	0.90	-0.34
Total valid votes		32,373	100.00	

=== 1972 ===
1972 Canadian federal election
Party	Candidate	Votes	%	±%
Progressive Conservative	Elmer MacKay	18,259	56.95	+4.37
Liberal	D. Laurence Mawhinney	9,288	28.97	-9.37
New Democratic	John Rod Brown	4,117	12.84	+6.20
Social Credit	John J. Henderson	397	1.24	-1.20
Total valid votes		32,061	100.00	

=== 1971 by-election ===
Canadian federal by-election, 31 May 1971 On the resignation of Russell MacEwan, 14 January 1971
Party	Candidate	Votes	%	±%
Progressive Conservative	Elmer MacKay	15,359	52.58	-5.99
Liberal	Clarrie Mackinnon	11,200	38.34	+5.07
New Democratic	Allan M. Marchbank	1,940	6.64	-1.52
Social Credit	John J. Henderson	714	2.44	
Total valid votes		29,213	100.00	

=== 1968 ===
1968 Canadian federal election
Party	Candidate	Votes	%
Progressive Conservative	Russell MacEwan	16,720	58.57
Liberal	Donald F. Stewart	9,499	33.27
New Democratic	Leo F. McKay	2,330	8.16
Total valid votes		28,549	100.00

== See also ==
- List of Canadian electoral districts
- Historical federal electoral districts of Canada
