= Peter MacKay =

Canadian lawyer and politician (born 1965)

The Honourable Peter MacKay PC KC
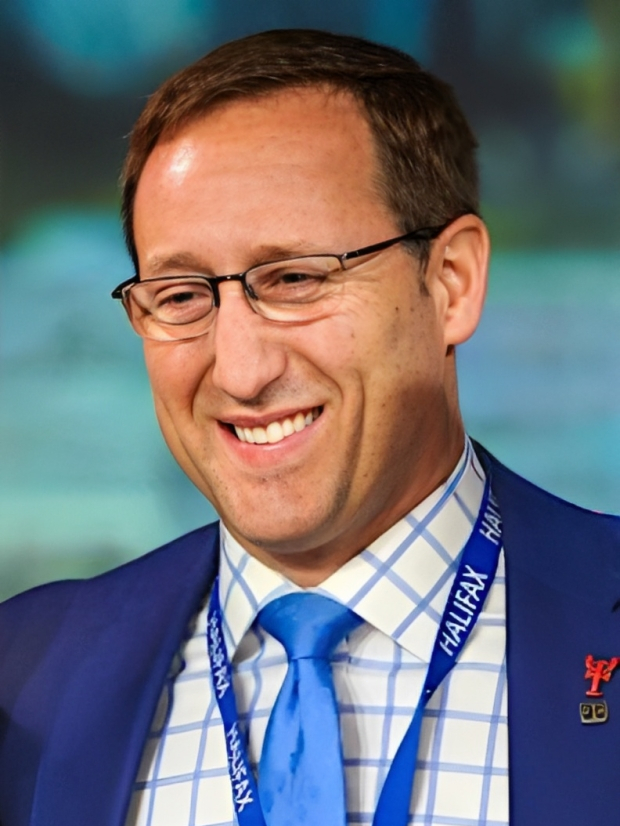
- MacKay in 2014

Minister of Justice Attorney General of Canada
- In office July 15, 2013 – November 4, 2015
- Prime Minister: Stephen Harper
- Preceded by: Rob Nicholson
- Succeeded by: Jody Wilson-Raybould

Minister of National Defence
- In office August 14, 2007 – July 15, 2013
- Prime Minister: Stephen Harper
- Preceded by: Gordon O'Connor
- Succeeded by: Rob Nicholson

Minister of Foreign Affairs
- In office February 6, 2006 – August 14, 2007
- Prime Minister: Stephen Harper
- Preceded by: Pierre Pettigrew
- Succeeded by: Maxime Bernier

Minister for the Atlantic Canada Opportunities Agency
- In office February 6, 2006 – January 19, 2010
- Prime Minister: Stephen Harper
- Preceded by: Joe McGuire
- Succeeded by: Keith Ashfield

Deputy Leader of the Conservative Party
- In office March 22, 2004 – November 5, 2015
- Leader: Stephen Harper
- Preceded by: Position established
- Succeeded by: Denis Lebel

Leader of the Progressive Conservative Party
- In office May 31, 2003 – December 7, 2003
- Preceded by: Joe Clark
- Succeeded by: Position abolished

Member of Parliament for Central Nova (Pictou—Antigonish—Guysborough; 1997–2004)
- In office June 2, 1997 – October 19, 2015
- Preceded by: Roseanne Skoke
- Succeeded by: Sean Fraser

Personal details
- Born: Peter Gordon MacKay; September 27, 1965 (age 61) New Glasgow, Nova Scotia, Canada
- Party: Conservative (since 2003)
- Other political affiliations: Progressive Conservative (1997–2003)
- Spouse: Nazanin Afshin-Jam (m. 2012)
- Children: 3
- Parents: Elmer MacKay (father); Macha MacKay (mother)
- Education: Acadia University (transferred); Carleton University (BA); Dalhousie University (LLB)
- Occupation: Politician; Crown attorney; lawyer; diplomat

Peter Gordon MacKay (born September 27, 1965) is a Canadian lawyer and politician, who served as Member of Parliament from 1997 to 2015 and as Minister of Justice and Attorney General (2013–2015), Minister of National Defence (2007–2013), and Minister of Foreign Affairs (2006–2007) in the Cabinet of Canada under Prime Minister Stephen Harper. MacKay became the final leader of the Progressive Conservative Party of Canada — he agreed to merge the party with Stephen Harper's Canadian Alliance in 2003, forming the Conservative Party of Canada and making MacKay one of the co-founders of the current conservative wing of Canadian politics.

The son of Canadian politician and Minister of Public Works Elmer MacKay, MacKay received his undergraduate degree from Acadia University and his law degree from Dalhousie University. MacKay represented the riding of Pictou—Antigonish—Guysborough from 1997 to 2004, and the riding of Central Nova from 2004 until 2015, when he decided not to run in that year's federal election. With the defeat of the Conservatives in the 2015 federal election, he was considered a potential candidate to succeed Stephen Harper as permanent leader of the party. Between 2015 and 2020, he was a partner with Baker McKenzie at their Toronto office.

On January 15, 2020, MacKay announced his candidacy for the 2020 Conservative leadership race. He was defeated by former veterans-affairs minister Erin O'Toole on the third ballot of the election. Following the race, he moved back to Nova Scotia and became a senior counsel with the law firm McInnes Cooper and a strategic advisor with Deloitte Canada.

== Early life and career ==
MacKay was born in New Glasgow, Nova Scotia. His father, Elmer MacKay (1936-2026) was a former PC cabinet minister, lumber businessman, and lawyer. His mother, Eirene Macha MacKay (née Delap; 1938–2017), was a psychologist and peace activist; through her, Peter MacKay is descended from James Alexander, 3rd Earl of Caledon and James Grimston, 1st Earl of Verulam. MacKay grew up in Wolfville, Nova Scotia with his three siblings. He graduated from Horton High School in Greenwich, Nova Scotia, and then went on to graduate with a Bachelor of Arts degree from Acadia University/Carleton University in 1987. MacKay then studied law at Dalhousie University and was called to the Nova Scotia Bar in June 1991. He worked for Thyssen Henschel, a steel producer, in Halifax, Nova Scotia, and in Düsseldorf and Kassel, Germany.

In 1993, MacKay accepted an appointment as Crown Attorney for the Central Region of Nova Scotia. He prosecuted cases at all levels, including youth and provincial courts as well as the Supreme Court of Canada. MacKay has publicly stated that the major impetus for his entry into federal politics was his frustrations with the shortcomings in the justice system, particularly his perception that the courts do not care about the impact crime has on victims.

== Member of Parliament ==
MacKay was first elected to the House of Commons of Canada in the June 2, 1997 federal election for Pictou—Antigonish—Guysborough, a riding in northeastern Nova Scotia. He was one of a handful of newly elected "Young Turk" PC MPs (including John Herron, André Bachand and Scott Brison), who were under 35 years old when elected and were considered the future leadership material that might restore the ailing Tories to their glory days. In his first term of office, MacKay served as Justice Critic and House Leader for the Progressive Conservative parliamentary caucus. MacKay was the PC member of the Board of Internal Economy and the Standing Committee on Justice and Human Rights. He also acted as an associate member of the Standing Committees on Canadian Heritage, Finance and the sub-committee on the Study of Sport. Peter MacKay served as PC Party House Leader from September 23, 1997, to September 12, 2001.

MacKay was re-elected in the 2000 federal election and was frequently touted by the media as a possible successor to PC Party leader Joe Clark. Many of his initial supporters referred to his strong performances in the House of Commons and magnetism as key attributes that would make him a popular leader. MacKay has been voted the "sexiest male MP in the House of Commons" by the Hill Times (a Parliament Hill newspaper) for six years in a row. When asked in a 2001 Canadian Broadcasting Corporation documentary on the resurgence of the PC Party if he would ever consider running for the PC leadership, MacKay quipped, "If there's one thing I've learned in politics it's 'never say never.' Jean Charest taught me that."

In August 2001, he was one of several PC MPs to engage in open cooperation talks with disaffected Canadian Alliance MPs in Mont-Tremblant, Quebec. Eventually a union of sorts was created between the PCs and the newly formed Democratic Representative Caucus (DRC). MacKay was appointed House Leader of the new PC-DR Parliamentary Coalition Caucus when it was formally recognized as a political body on September 10, 2001. The PC-DR initiative collapsed in April 2002, raising questions about Clark's leadership. Clark announced his impending resignation as party leader at the PC Party's bi-annual convention held in Edmonton, Alberta in August 2002. MacKay's name was one of the first to be raised as a possible leadership contender.

=== 2003 Progressive Conservative leadership race ===
MacKay was largely seen as the assumed victor of the race from the outset of the leadership contest. Ultimately, his candidacy was helped by the absence of so-called "dream candidates" such as provincial Progressive Conservative Premiers Bernard Lord, Mike Harris and Ralph Klein who did not run for the leadership. MacKay formally launched his leadership campaign in his hometown of New Glasgow in January 2003. From the onset of the campaign, MacKay insisted that his primary goal upon assuming the leadership would be the rebuilding the fractured conservative movement from within the PC tent. For much of the race, MacKay was the clear front-runner. Several opponents, including former PC Party Treasurer Jim Prentice, social conservative candidate Craig Chandler, and Red Tory Nova Scotia MP Scott Brison, painted MacKay as a status quo or "establishment" candidate who could effectively question the Prime Minister.

MacKay's campaign was largely based on his leadership skills and a national organization rather than on policies or new directions. MacKay is largely viewed by political analysts as a Red Tory. He voted in favour of same-sex marriage in 2006.

==== Leadership convention ====
MacKay entered the first ballot of the PC leadership convention held on May 31, 2003 with roughly 41% of the delegates supporting him. However, on the second ballot, MacKay's support dropped to 39%. On the third ballot, MacKay's support reached 45% but many of his supporters were convinced that he had hit his popular peak. Some analysts noted that the eliminated third-place challenger David Orchard drew his 25% bulk of delegate supporters largely from the Western prairie provinces. Orchard was prepared to speak with either MacKay or Prentice to determine if a deal could be reached over some of the issues that he raised during the leadership campaign. As the results of the third ballot were called, MacKay's campaign manager, PC Senator Noël Kinsella, hastily arranged a backroom meeting between MacKay, Orchard, and their campaign advisors. During the meeting, MacKay reached a deal with his rival, and Orchard emerged from the room urging his delegates to support MacKay. Press officials immediately demanded to know what had inspired Orchard's surprise move. Orchard repeatedly referred to a "gentleman's agreement" made between himself and MacKay that had led to his qualified support.

MacKay won the final ballot with nearly 65% of the delegates supporting him. For the next few weeks, the specific details of the "Orchard deal" remained vague: a secret between MacKay, Orchard, and their advisors. However, it was eventually revealed that the "Orchard deal" promised a review of the PC Party's policies on the North American Free Trade Agreement, no merger or joint candidates with the Canadian Alliance, and a promise to redouble efforts to rebuild the national status of the Progressive Conservative Party. The agreement also included re-examining the PC Party's policies on government subsidies for national railways and preserving the environment. The deal also requested that MacKay "clean up" the party's head office and specifically requested that the party's National Director be fired. Further evidence later revealed Scott Brison's cellphone number written in the margins of the note for some unexplained reason. In an attempt to heal internal rifts after the convention, MacKay edited out the number. After Brison defected to the Liberal party, however, MacKay revealed the original copy. The agreement prompted much outrage and controversy amongst United Alternative supporters and was ribaldly referred to by CA MP Jason Kenney as "a deal with the Devil".

At first, MacKay seemed to be willing to adhere to the deal. In June, several Clark-appointed personnel were let go from the party's main office and MacKay appointed new experienced staff whose loyalties were more closely linked to himself and former Prime Minister and PC Party leader Brian Mulroney. MacKay also appointed a couple of low level staff workers who had been supportive of David Orchard's leadership bid. In July, MacKay struck up a "Blue Ribbon PC Policy Review Panel", made up of conservative MPs, Senators, and Orchard himself, that was to be chaired by MP Bill Casey, in order to reexamine the party's policies on NAFTA. The committee was scheduled to hold talks across the country and make a report to the leader by January 2004.

By mid-July, political opponents and fellow Tories began attacking MacKay over the "Orchard deal." MacKay's conservative rival Stephen Harper suggested that the PC Party had hit rock-bottom when its policies and directions would be beholden to a "prairie socialist." The secretive nature of the deal also led to concerns from within the party's headquarters and constituency associations. David Orchard was seen by many within the party as an "outsider" who was attempting to turn the Progressive Conservative Party into the "Prairie Co-operative Party". Some felt that MacKay's credibility and leadership were undermined by the deal and that electoral expectations were low for the upcoming election that was expected to occur in less than a year's time. Rex Murphy noted in a Globe and Mail column that MacKay's leadership arrived "stillborn" and that, perhaps for the first time in recent memory, a party immediately emerged from a leadership convention grievously weakened and even less united than when it entered the convention.

=== Conservative party merger ===
Public musings that the divided PCs would be marginalized in a future election between a relatively stable western-based CA under Stephen Harper and the massively popular Paul Martin Liberals (although Jean Chrétien remained the Liberal leader until November 2003, he had announced he would not run again), MacKay encouraged talks between high-profile members of the Canadian Alliance and the Progressive Conservatives.

On October 15, 2003, the merger talks culminated in MacKay and Alliance leader Stephen Harper signing an Agreement in Principle on the establishment of the Conservative Party of Canada, whereby the Progressive Conservatives and the Canadian Alliance would merge to form a new Conservative Party of Canada. While MacKay was roundly criticized in some Red Tory circles for permitting a union under his watch, MacKay's efforts to sell the merger to the PC membership were successful: 90.4% of the party's elected delegates supported the deal in a vote on December 6, 2003.

Some PC caucus members refused to accept the merger: long-time MP and former Prime Minister Joe Clark continued to sit as a "Progressive Conservative" for the remainder of the Parliament, as did MPs John Herron and André Bachand, while Scott Brison left the new party to join the Liberal Party in December 2003. In January 2004, several Senators left the party to sit as independents or "Progressive Conservatives". MacKay announced on January 13, 2004, that he would not run for the leadership of the new Conservative Party. On March 22, he was named deputy leader of the new party by newly elected leader Stephen Harper. He was easily re-elected in the June 28, 2004 federal election in the newly redistributed riding of Central Nova.

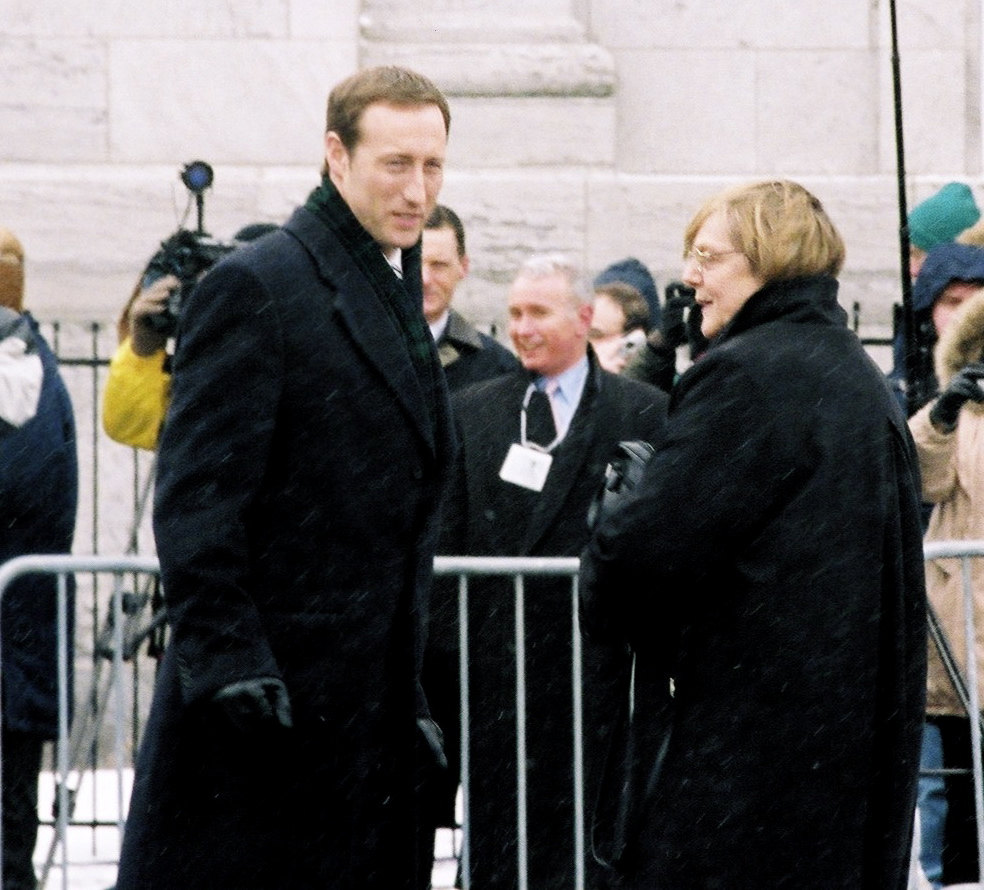
MacKay arrives at Rideau Hall for the swearing in of the new government after the 2006 Canadian election.

On September 29, 2005, the Premier of Nova Scotia, John Hamm, announced his intention to resign. There was speculation that MacKay would return to the province to pursue provincial politics and enter the Progressive Conservative Association of Nova Scotia leadership race to become the Premier. MacKay would have been considered a front-runner in the race; however, he decided to remain with the Federal Conservatives. The Liberal government lost a motion of non-confidence on November 28, 2005. In the resulting January 2006 election, the Conservative Party was elected with a minority government. He did retain his seat by a comfortable margin.

== Government ==
=== Minister of Foreign Affairs ===
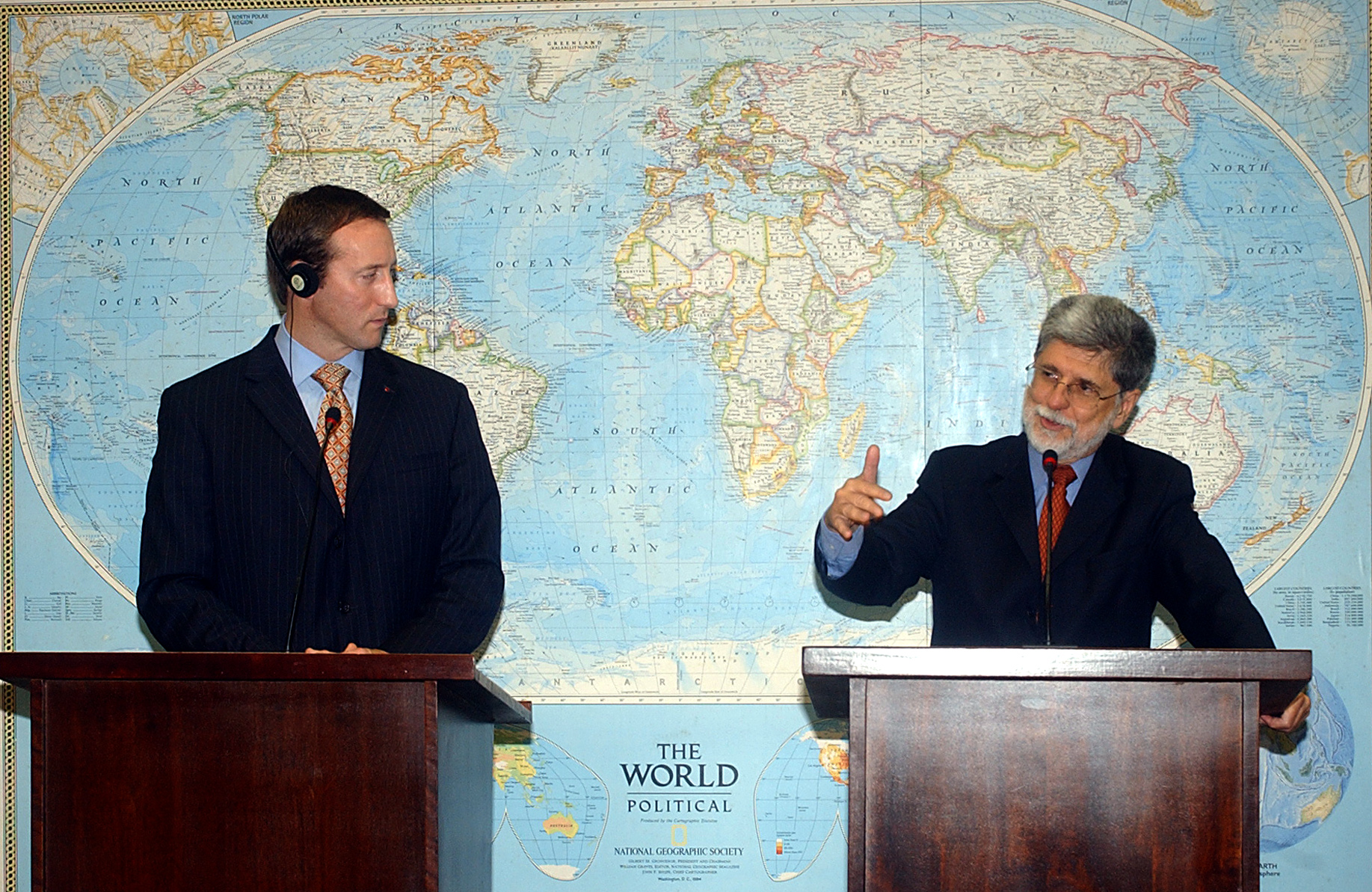
MacKay as Minister of Foreign Affairs, speaking with his Brazilian counterpart, Celso Amorim, February 2007

Following the Conservative victory in the 2006 election, Prime Minister Stephen Harper named MacKay as Minister of Foreign Affairs and Minister for the Atlantic Canada Opportunities Agency; he was also tasked to be the political minister for both his home province, and for neighbouring Prince Edward Island, just as his father Elmer had done between 1988 and 1993.

During the first mandate, his biggest issue was the Lebanon–Israel–Hezbollah crisis that occurred in July 2006. The government decided to evacuate thousands of Canadians from Lebanon to safer locations and many back to Canada. MacKay responded to critics saying that the process was slow, that the boats (those which were used to evacuate) had limited capacity. MacKay's statements in support of the Israelis during the 2006 Israel-Lebanon conflict created a national debate in Canada, especially among Arabs and Muslim Canadians who opposed MacKay's position. During this period MacKay and the Conservative Party of Canada joined the Bush Administration in opposing the United Nations' call for a ceasefire. It was also during this period that MacKay made a controversial statement in which he referred to Hezbollah as a "cancer" in Lebanon. Hezbollah is formally recognized by the government of Canada as a terrorist organization.

On October 19, 2006, during a debate on the Conservative Party's clean air plan, MP Mark Holland said that a Liberal colleague, David McGuinty asked MacKay about the impact of pollution on humans and animals by asking, "What about your dog?" This referred to MacKay posing for photographs on a farm with his neighbour's dog following his break-up with Belinda Stronach. MacKay then allegedly pointed to Stronach's vacant chair and replied "You already have her." Holland lodged a complaint with the Commons Speaker and demanded an apology from MacKay. Stronach has said that the comment was disrespectful to both herself and Canadian women, and has herself asked for an apology. MacKay has denied referring to Stronach as a "dog". The alleged comment was not heard by Speaker of the House Peter Milliken and it was not recorded in the official Hansard. Afterwards, Milliken and his staff said that they could not hear the remarks on the tape recording.

=== Minister of National Defence ===
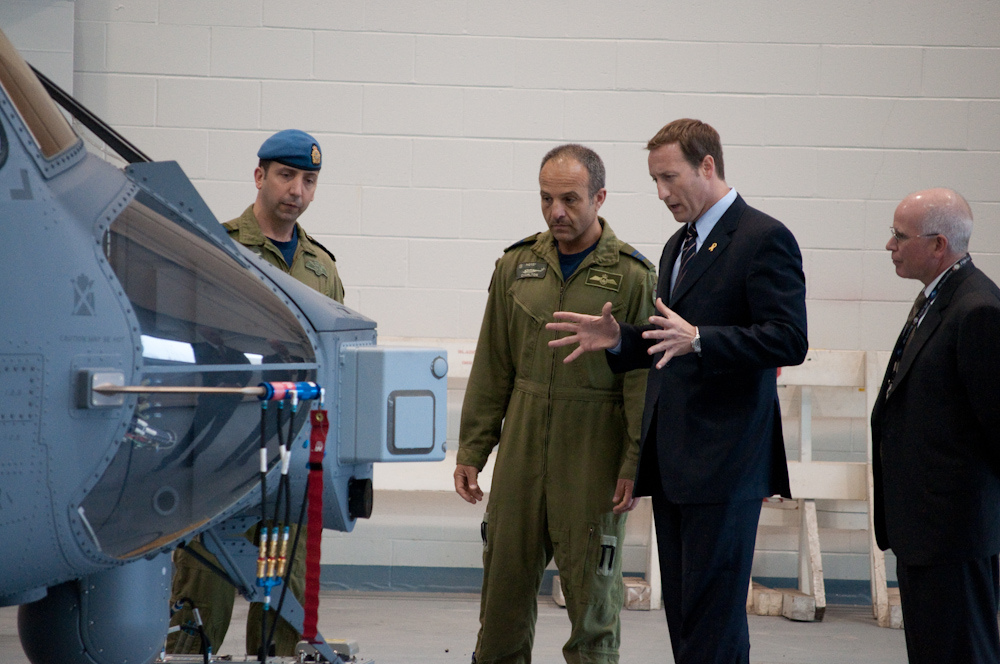
MacKay inspects a new Sikorsky CH-148 Cyclone with members of the Royal Canadian Air Force, May 2011.

On August 14, 2007, Stephen Harper shuffled MacKay from Foreign Affairs to Defence, replacing Gordon O'Connor. On November 6, 2007, while attending a meeting at Forward Operating Base Wilson, 20 kilometres west of Kandahar City, Mackay was unharmed as two rockets struck the base at about 11 a.m. local time. Mackay described the incident: "There was an explosion. It was a loud bang", said MacKay. "When it happened, we heard the explosion, we heard the whistle overhead, we were told to get down and we did." The incident happened on the same day that a suicide bomber detonated an explosive in Baghlan in the northeastern part of the country killing at least 75 including several politicians. While Taliban insurgents were suspected of being behind the bombing, it was not believed to be related to the attack in Kandahar.

In 2008, MacKay announced a broad exhaustive and very expensive program to upgrade the Canadian military's equipment, spending over $400 billion over 25 years. Unlike every previous spending announcement of its kind, no "white paper" or detailed breakdown of this number was available nor was any claimed to exist. This led to widespread speculation that an election was coming. Stephen Harper did in fact declare Parliament "dysfunctional" in August 2008 and called on Governor General of Canada Michaëlle Jean to dissolve parliament for the 2008 federal election.

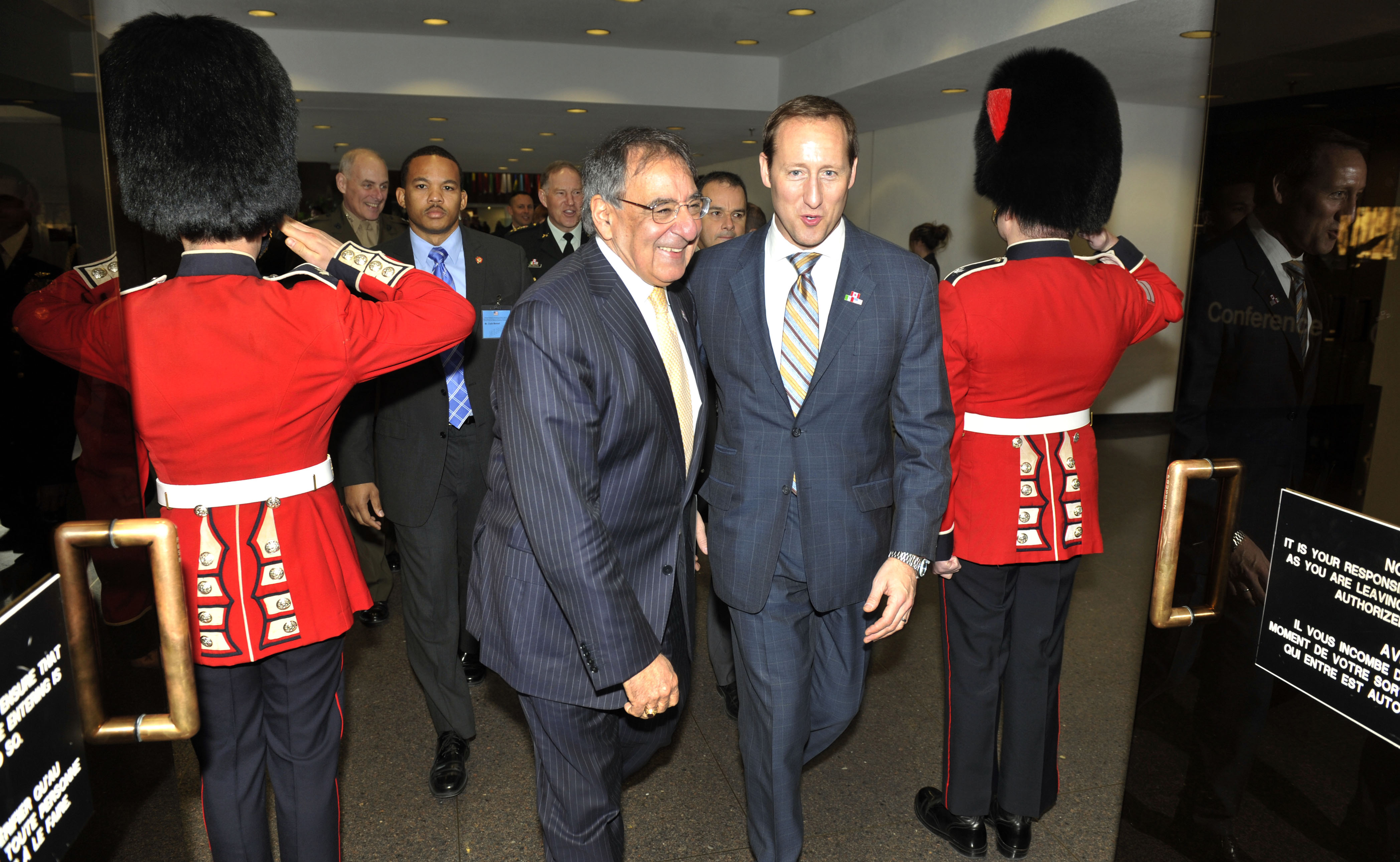
MacKay as with his American counterpart, Leon Panetta, during a trilateral meeting with defence ministers from Canada, Mexico, and the United States, March 2012

In July 2010, MacKay was accused of inappropriately using public funds when he combined the use of a Canadian Cormorant military helicopter for both a search and rescue demonstration, and to transport the minister from a private fishing camp in Newfoundland to Gander Airport. The cost of this to taxpayers was approximately $16,000. MacKay, then the Minister of National Defence, defended his use of the military helicopter stating, "Three days into the visit I participated in a search and rescue demonstration with 103 squadron 9 Wing Gander. I shortened my stay by a day to take part in that demonstration".

In 2009, he undertook two days of basic military training as part of CBC Television's Make the Politician Work.

On June 5, 2012, it was revealed that a widely publicized 2010 news conference announcing Conservative plans to buy 65 F-35 Stealth Fighters had cost $47,000. Documents provided to parliament by Peter Mackay indicated that Lockheed Martin had delivered the F-35 mockup used in the photo-op for free, and that the cost was primarily for services to support the news conference and one hundred invited guests.

=== Minister of Justice and Attorney General ===
On July 15, 2013, the cabinet was shuffled, and Mackay became the Minister of Justice and Attorney General of Canada, replacing Rob Nicholson, who took over the defence portfolio.

On March 5, 2014, MacKay generated controversy when, in response to opposition Liberal MP Kevin Lamoureux, he tossed documents purporting to concern the issue of missing and murdered Aboriginal women onto the floor of the House of Commons. The following week, he apologized to the Commons for his outburst.

== Out of Parliament ==
=== 2015–present ===
On May 29, 2015, MacKay announced that he would not be a candidate in the 2015 federal election.

In February 2016, MacKay joined law firm Baker McKenzie as a partner. MacKay's family now resides in The Beaches area of Toronto.

On November 17, 2017, MacKay said he had not ruled out the possibility of running for the leadership of the Nova Scotia Progressive Conservative Party.

After the Conservative defeat in the 2015 election, MacKay was considered a potential candidate to succeed former Prime Minister Stephen Harper as permanent leader of the Conservative Party. On September 12, 2016, MacKay announced he would not seek the Conservative party leadership.

On January 15, 2020, MacKay announced his intention to run for the 2020 Conservative Party of Canada leadership race.

He was appointed to the board of Cielo Waste Solutions Corp. on April 8, 2021.

==== 2020 Conservative leadership race ====
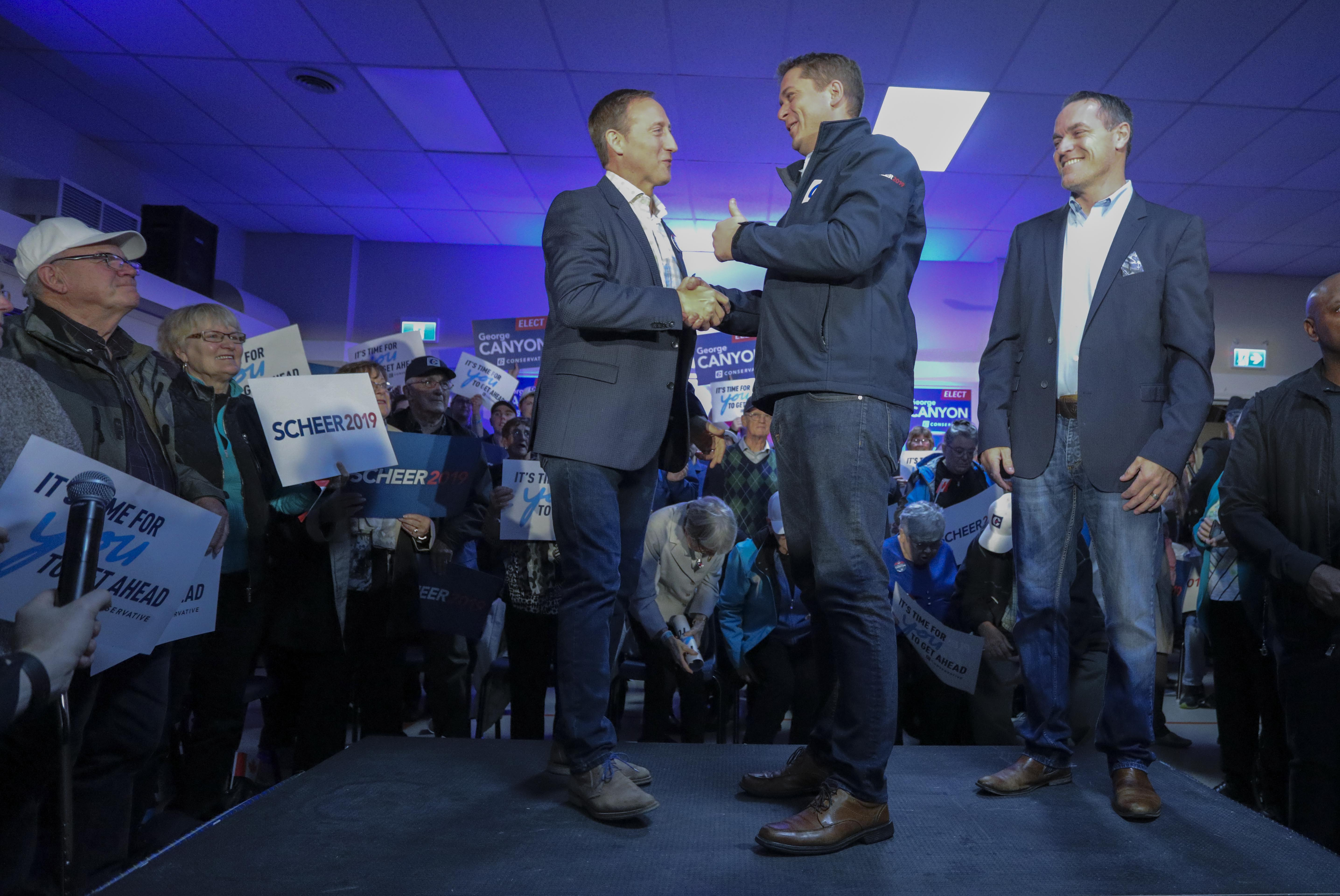
MacKay (centre-left foreground) with Andrew Scheer during the 2019 Canadian federal election campaign

On October 10, 2019, The Globe and Mail reported that MacKay supporters were preparing to launch a leadership bid should Conservative Party leader Andrew Scheer fail to secure a government in the 2019 federal election. MacKay responded to questions by saying that he was "not [aware]" of Conservatives backers organizing a campaign, and that he was "doing everything I can to help Andrew and support him and his team. I'm not entertaining that at all."

On December 12, 2019, Scheer announced he was resigning as Conservative party leader, but would stay on until a new leader was chosen.

On January 15, 2020, MacKay announced his intention to run for the 2020 Conservative Party of Canada leadership race. After weeks of speculation, MacKay tweeted from his Twitter account: "I'm in. Stay tuned." He officially launched his campaign on January 25, 2020 at the Nova Scotia Museum of Industry in Stellarton, Nova Scotia. On January 26, 2020, a Washington Post columnist posted a comparison of Peter MacKay's campaign logo and that of personal finance blog Maple Money, which started comparisons to the previous Canadian Energy Centre trademark issues.

MacKay was defeated by Erin O'Toole on the third ballot of the leadership vote.

After the vote, it was revealed that MacKay spent $124,000 on security during the campaign in response to numerous death threats that were lodged against him and his family.

== Personal life ==
MacKay was chosen as "Canada's Sexiest Male MP" by The Hill Times from 1999–2007 and 2009, coming in second in 2008 to Maxime Bernier. His former longtime girlfriend was Lisa Michelle Merrithew, daughter of former Mulroney cabinet minister Gerald Merrithew. They reportedly ended their relationship in 2004. He then was romantically linked to fellow MP Belinda Stronach in published reports. In an interview in the Toronto Star on January 8, 2005, Stronach confirmed that she and MacKay were dating. Stronach, elected as a Conservative in the 2004 election, crossed the floor to the Liberal Party on May 17, 2005. On May 18, 2005, MacKay told the CBC that his relationship with Stronach was indeed over, and that it had come as a surprise to him that she had crossed the floor. According to Don Martin, a National Post columnist who wrote a biography, Belinda: the Political and Private Life of Belinda Stronach in September 2006, MacKay reacted "with volcanic fury" when he learned about her defection.

On November 26, 2005, the National Post revealed that Mackay and Sophie Desmarais of the billionaire Power Corporation family were dating.

By September 2006, MacKay's romantic life was again in the papers, with The New York Times reporting on gossip about his alleged involvement with United States Secretary of State Condoleezza Rice. The New York Times described him as "Tall, athletic, young, blond", and having "a tan and the build of someone who spends his time on the rugby field, not holed up reading G-8 communiqués."

MacKay had been seen in public dating Jana Juginovic, director of programming at CTV News Channel, after having kept their relationship private for many months. They attended the annual Black & White Opera Soirée together at the National Arts Centre in Ottawa on February 21, 2009. MacKay's engagement to Juginovic was announced on November 1, 2009. MacKay and Juginovic later called off the engagement in June 2010.

On January 4, 2012, MacKay married Nazanin Afshin-Jam, an Iranian-born former beauty queen, in a ceremony in Mexico. Afshin-Jam holds degrees in international relations and political science. She is co-founder and president of Stop Child Executions, a human rights group whose aim is to focus world attention on the plight of young people on death row in Iran. The couple has two sons, Kian Alexander MacKay, born April 1, 2013, and Caledon Cyrus MacKay, born July 28, 2018 as well as one daughter, Valentia Makaja MacKay, born September 30, 2015.

In his spare time, MacKay has served on many volunteer boards including New Leaf and Tearmann House. He has also been active in Big Brothers Big Sisters, the Pictou County Senior Rugby Club and the YMCA. A sports enthusiast, MacKay was active in local rugby, baseball, football and hockey teams in Pictou County, Nova Scotia. He played for the Nova Scotia Keltics rugby union club.

== Electoral record ==
2020 Conservative Party of Canada leadership results by ballot
Candidate	1st ballot				2nd ballot				3rd ballot			
Candidate	Votes cast	%	Points allocated	%	Votes cast	%	Points allocated	%	Votes cast	%	Points allocated	%
Erin O'Toole	51,258	29.39%	10,681.40	31.60%	56,907	33.20%	11,903.69	35.22%	90,635	58.86%	19,271.74	57.02%
Peter MacKay	52,851	30.30%	11,328.55	33.52%	54,165	31.60%	11,756.01	34.78%	63,356	41.14%	14,528.26	42.98%
Leslyn Lewis	43,017	24.67%	6,925.38	20.49%	60,316	35.20%	10,140.30	30.00%	Eliminated			
Derek Sloan	27,278	15.64%	4,864.67	14.39%	Eliminated							
Total	174,404	100%	33,800	100%	171,388	100%	33,800	100%	153,991	100%	33,800	100%

2011 Canadian federal election: Central Nova
Party	Candidate	Votes	%	±%	Expenditures
Conservative	Peter MacKay	21,593	56.79	+10.19	$66,993.75
New Democratic	David Parker	9,412	24.75	+5.19	$22,391.41
Liberal	John Hamilton	5,614	14.76	–	$38,162.02
Green	Matthew Chisholm	1,406	3.70	-28.54	$3,941.29
Total valid votes/expense limit		38,025	100.0		$83,138.94
Total rejected, unmarked and declined ballots		226	0.59	-0.18	
Turnout		38,251	65.00	-2.01	
Eligible voters		57,963			
Conservative hold		Swing		+2.50	

2008 Canadian federal election: Central Nova
Party	Candidate	Votes	%	±%	Expenditures
Conservative	Peter MacKay	18,240	46.60	+5.94	$61,468.89
Green	Elizabeth May	12,620	32.24	+30.65	$57,490.60
New Democratic	Louise Lorifice	7,659	19.56	-13.33	$39,917.36
Christian Heritage	Michael Harris MacKay	427	1.09	–	none listed
Canadian Action	Paul Kemp	196	0.50	–	$87.79
Total valid votes/expense limit		39,142	100.0		$80,462
Total rejected, unmarked and declined ballots		304	0.77	+0.42	
Turnout		39,446	67.01	-2.16	
Eligible voters		58,863			
Conservative hold		Swing		-24.71	

2006 Canadian federal election: Central Nova
Party	Candidate	Votes	%	±%	Expenditures
Conservative	Peter MacKay	17,134	40.66	-2.61	$55,938.56
New Democratic	Alexis MacDonald	13,861	32.89	+5.23	$28,582.28
Liberal	Dan Walsh	10,349	24.56	-1.83	$43,064.69
Green	David Orton	671	1.59	-1.09	$901.04
Marxist–Leninist	Allan H. Bezanson	124	0.29	–	none listed
Total valid votes/expense limit		42,139	100.0		$75,651
Total rejected, unmarked and declined ballots		147	0.35	-0.17	
Turnout		42,286	69.17	+3.85	
Eligible voters		61,137			
Conservative hold		Swing		-3.92	

2004 Canadian federal election: Central Nova
Party	Candidate	Votes	%	±%	Expenditures
Conservative	Peter MacKay	16,376	43.27	-8.13	$53,745.97
New Democratic	Alexis MacDonald	10,470	27.66	+14.84	$25,231.91
Liberal	Susan Green	9,986	26.39	-3.95	$44,229.04
Green	Rebecca Mosher	1,015	2.68	–	$222.50
Total valid votes/expense limit		37,847	100.0		$73,053
Total rejected, unmarked and declined ballots		198	0.52		
Turnout		38,045	65.32	-0.92	
Eligible voters		58,240			
Conservative notional gain from Progressive Conservative		Swing		-11.48	
Changes from 2000 are based on redistributed results. Conservative Party change is based on the combination of Canadian Alliance and Progressive Conservative Party totals.

2003 Progressive Conservative leadership election – delegate support by ballot
Candidate	1st ballot		2nd ballot		3rd ballot		4th ballot	
Candidate	Votes cast	%	Votes cast	%	Votes cast	%	Votes cast	%
MACKAY, Peter Gordon	1,080	41.1%	1,018	39.7%	1,128	45.0%	1,538	64.8%
PRENTICE, James (Jim)	478	18.2%	466	18.2%	761	30.4%	836	35.2%
ORCHARD, David	640	24.3%	619	24.1%	617	24.6%	Endorsed MacKay	
BRISON, Scott A.	431	16.4%	463	18.0%	Endorsed Prentice			
CHANDLER, Craig B.	0	—	Withdrew before 1st ballot began; Endorsed Prentice					
Total	2,629	100.0%	2,566	100.0%	2,506	100.0%	2,374	100.0%

2000 Canadian federal election: Pictou—Antigonish—Guysborough
Party	Candidate	Votes	%
Progressive Conservative	Peter MacKay	19,256	48.32
Liberal	Raymond Mason	12,634	31.70
New Democratic	Wendy Panagopoulous	4,498	11.29
Alliance	Harvey Henderson	2,915	7.31
Independent	Darryl Gallivan	551	1.38

1997 Canadian federal election: Pictou—Antigonish—Guysborough
Party	Candidate	Votes	%
Progressive Conservative	Peter MacKay	18,196	42.34
Liberal	Francis Leblanc	12,851	29.90
New Democratic	Charlene Long	8,284	19.28
Reform	Henry Van Berkel	3,416	7.95
Natural Law	Richard Robertson	228	0.53

28th Canadian Ministry (2006–2015) – Cabinet of Stephen Harper
Cabinet posts (4)
Predecessor	Office	Successor
Pierre Pettigrew	Minister of Foreign Affairs; 2006–2007	Maxime Bernier
Joe McGuire	Minister for the Atlantic Canada Opportunities Agency; 2006–2010	Keith Ashfield
Gordon O'Connor	Minister of National Defence; 2007–2013	Rob Nicholson
Rob Nicholson	Minister of Justice and Attorney General; 2013–2015	Jody Wilson-Raybould
