= Hopewell, Nova Scotia =

Community in Nova Scotia, Canada

Coordinates: 45°28′57.73″N 62°41′54.45″W

Hopewell in Nova Scotia

Hopewell is a community in the Canadian province of Nova Scotia, located in Pictou County.

One of Canada's first automobiles was manufactured at Hopewell The Victorian Horseless Carriage, the first gasoline powered car built in the Maritimes was created in Hopewell by furniture maker John MacArthur in 1899. In 1908 "The Nick " was a two-passenger buggy with iron tires, chain drive, and tiller steering also built in Hopewell.

Hopewell lies tucked in the valley of the East River, outside the towns of Stellarton and New Glasgow (TCH 104 Exit 24 and south on 374 out of Stellarton). Hopewell is part of the beautiful East River Valley, a scenic pastoral area known for its colourful blueberry fields, winding river, and lush farmlands. One of many such communities that sprung up along the valley, it was once joined by a railroad which delivered supplies and mail. Today the small community is the home of the Hopewell Footbridge, a municipal heritage site and one of the last surviving footbridges in North America.

The famous country music singer George Canyon grew up in Foxbrook, not far from the Hopewell. While he was participating on the reality television show "Nashville Star," his wife and two children continued to live in the community. Canyon still owns land in the area.

Hopewell has a rich Gaelic heritage. The "Maclean, Sinclair family fonds" collection came from the estate of George Maclean Sinclair, from Hopewell, in 1953. The contribution was then described as "the finest collection of original Gaelic material in Canada."
