= Mona Fortier =

Canadian politician (born 1972)

The Honourable Mona Fortier PC MP

Parliamentary Secretary to the Minister of Foreign Affairs
- Incumbent
- Assumed office June 5, 2025 Serving with Rob Oliphant

Chief Government Whip
- In office December 21, 2024 – March 14, 2025
- Prime Minister: Justin Trudeau
- Preceded by: Ruby Sahota
- Succeeded by: Rechie Valdez

President of the Treasury Board
- In office October 26, 2021 – July 26, 2023
- Prime Minister: Justin Trudeau
- Preceded by: Jean-Yves Duclos
- Succeeded by: Anita Anand

Minister of Middle Class Prosperity Associate Minister of Finance
- In office November 20, 2019 – October 26, 2021
- Prime Minister: Justin Trudeau
- Preceded by: Position established
- Succeeded by: Randy Boissonault (Associate Minister of Finance)

Member of Parliament for Ottawa—Vanier—Gloucester Ottawa—Vanier (2017–2025)
- Incumbent
- Assumed office April 3, 2017
- Preceded by: Mauril Bélanger

Personal details
- Born: August 26, 1972 (age 54) Ottawa, Ontario, Canada
- Party: Liberal
- Children: 3
- Education: University of Ottawa

Mona N. Fortier PC MP (born August 26, 1972) is a Canadian politician who previously served as the President of the Treasury Board from 2021 to 2023. A member of the Liberal Party, Fortier has represented the electoral district of Ottawa—Vanier since winning the 3 April 2017 by-election. She previously served as the associate minister of finance and minister of middle class prosperity. Prior to her election, Fortier worked as Chief Director of Communications and Market Development for La Cité Collégiale in Ottawa. She was also president of the Ottawa—Vanier Liberal riding association and was an advisor on the Alex Munter mayoral campaign in 2006.

== Electoral record ==
2025 Canadian federal election: Ottawa—Vanier—Gloucester
Party	Candidate	Votes	%	±%
Liberal	Mona Fortier	45,934	67.37	+18.37
Conservative	Dean Wythe	14,633	21.46	+0.93
New Democratic	Tristan Oliff	5,164	7.57	–15.69
Green	Christian Proulx	1,345	1.97	–1.07
People's	Marty Simms	349	0.51	–2.68
Libertarian	Coreen Corcoran	338	0.50	+0.10
Independent	Elizabeth Benoit	238	0.35	N/A
Marxist–Leninist	Christian Legeais	182	0.27	N/A
Total valid votes		68,183	98.98	
Total rejected ballots		705	1.02	+0.04
Turnout		68,888	69.34	+4.11
Eligible voters		99,345		
Liberal notional hold		Swing		+8.72
Source: Elections Canada

2021 Canadian federal election: Ottawa—Vanier
Party	Candidate	Votes	%	±%	Expenditures
Liberal	Mona Fortier	28,462	49.0	-2.2	$92,344.95
New Democratic	Lyse-Pascale Inamuco	13,703	23.6	+2.4	$38,377.14
Conservative	Heidi Jensen	11,611	20.0	+2.6	$16,774.67
People's	Jean-Jacques Desgranges	1,855	3.2	+1.5	$0.00
Green	Christian Proulx	1,816	3.1	-4.4	$8,354.08
Libertarian	Daniel Elford	248	0.4	–	$0.00
Free	Crystelle Bourguignon	179	0.3	–	$2.00
Independent	Marie-Chantal TaiEl Leriche	157	0.3	–	$0.00
Total valid votes/expense limit		58,031	–	–	$117,527.01
Total rejected ballots		576			
Turnout		58,607	65.80		
Eligible voters		89,069			
Source: Elections Canada

2019 Canadian federal election: Ottawa—Vanier
Party	Candidate	Votes	%	±%	Expenditures
Liberal	Mona Fortier	32,679	51.2	0	$76,159.78
New Democratic	Stéphanie Mercier	13,516	21.2	-7.5	none listed
Conservative	Joel Bernard	11,118	17.4	+2	$18,239.00
Green	Oriana Ngabirano	4,796	7.5	+4.2	$8,669.23
People's	Paul Durst	1,064	1.7		$6,338.44
Rhinoceros	Derek Miller	229	0.4		$0.00
Independent	Joel Altman	211	0.3		$281.93
Communist	Michelle Paquette	115	0.2		$496.90
Independent	Daniel James McHugh	94	0.1		$0.00
Marxist–Leninist	Christian Legeais	59	0.1		$0.00
Total valid votes/expense limit		63,881	100.0		
Total rejected ballots		699			
Turnout		64,580	71.0		
Eligible voters		91,015			
Liberal hold		Swing		+3.75	
Source: Elections Canada

Canadian federal by-election, April 3, 2017: Ottawa—Vanier Death of Mauril Bélanger
Party	Candidate	Votes	%	±%
Liberal	Mona Fortier	15,195	51.33	−6.24
New Democratic	Emilie Taman	8,557	28.91	+9.66
Conservative	Adrian Paul Papara	4,484	15.15	−3.96
Green	Nira Dookeran	999	3.37	+0.26
Independent	John Turmel	147	0.50	
Libertarian	Damien Wilson	122	0.41	−0.30
Independent	Christina Wilson	99	0.33	
Total valid votes/expense limit		29,603	100.0	–
Total rejected ballots		176	-	
Turnout		29,779		
Eligible voters		86,404		
Liberal hold		Swing		−7.91
Source: Elections Canada
