= Pictou—Antigonish—Guysborough =

Former federal electoral district in Nova Scotia, Canada

Nova Scotia electoral district

Defunct federal electoral district
- Legislature: House of Commons
- District created: 1996
- District abolished: 2003
- First contested: 1997
- Last contested: 2000

Demographics
- Census division(s): Antigonish, Guysborough, Pictou

Pictou—Antigonish—Guysborough was a federal electoral district in the province of Nova Scotia, Canada, that was represented in the House of Commons of Canada from 1997 to 2004.

This riding was created in 1996 from Cape Breton Highlands—Canso and Central Nova ridings, and consisted of the counties of Pictou, Antigonish and Guysborough. It was abolished in 2003 when it was redistributed into Cape Breton—Canso and Central Nova ridings.

Its only member was Peter G. MacKay from the Progressive Conservative Party of Canada.

== Members of Parliament ==
This riding elected the following members of Parliament:

Parliament	Years	Member	Party
Pictou—Antigonish—Guysborough; Riding created from Cape Breton Highlands—Canso and Central Nova
36th	1997–2000	Peter MacKay	Progressive Conservative
37th	2000–2003	Peter MacKay	Progressive Conservative
37th	2003–2004	Peter MacKay	Conservative
Riding dissolved into Cape Breton—Canso and Central Nova

== Election results ==
2000 Canadian federal election
Party	Candidate	Votes	%
Progressive Conservative	Peter MacKay	19,256	48.32
Liberal	Raymond Mason	12,634	31.70
New Democratic	Wendy Panagopoulous	4,498	11.29
Alliance	Harvey Henderson	2,915	7.31
Independent	Darryl Gallivan	551	1.38

1997 Canadian federal election
Party	Candidate	Votes	%
Progressive Conservative	Peter MacKay	18,196	42.34
Liberal	Francis Leblanc	12,851	29.90
New Democratic	Charlene Long	8,284	19.28
Reform	Henry Van Berkel	3,416	7.95
Natural Law	Richard Robertson	228	0.53

== See also ==
- List of Canadian electoral districts
- Historical federal electoral districts of Canada
