= McMillan (surname) =

MacMillan, Macmillan, McMillan, and M'Millan are variants of a Scottish surname; see also the similar surname McMillen. The origin of the name derives from the origin of the Scottish Clan MacMillan. The progenitor of the clan was said to be Airbertach, Hebridean prince of the old royal house of Moray. Airbertach had a son named Cormac, who was a bishop, and Cormac's own son Gilchrist, or in Gaelic, Gille Chriosd, the progenitor of the Clann an Mhaoil, was a religious man like his father. Because of this, Gille Chriosd wore the tonsure, which gave him the nickname Maolan or Gillemaol. As a Columban priest, his head would have been shaved over the front of his head in the style of Saint John the Evangelist, rather than at the vertex of his head (the dominant style in The Church of Rome). This distinctive tonsure is described in Gaelic as 'Mhaoillan'. The name MacMillan thus literally means, "son of the tonsure".

People having this name include:

== People ==
- Robbie Coltrane (real name Anthony McMillan, (1950–2022), British actor
- Alexander Macmillan (disambiguation), multiple people
- Angus McMillan (1810–1865), Australian explorer
- Archie McMillan (1894–1917), Scottish footballer
- Ben McMillan (1961–2008), American musician; lead singer of Skin Yard and lead singer/rhythm guitarist of Gruntruck.
- Bertie McMillan, Scottish footballer
- Billy McMillan (disambiguation), multiple people
- Brian McMillan (born 1963), South African cricketer
- Brockway McMillan (1915–2016), American scientist, former undersecretary of the Air Force and the second director of the National Reconnaissance Office
- Bruce McMillan (disambiguation), multiple people
- Colin R. McMillan (1935–2003), assistant United States secretary of defense
- Craig McMillan (born 1976), New Zealand cricketer
- Daniel Hunter McMillan (1846–1933), Manitoba politician
- Daniel MacMillan (1813–1857), British publisher, brother of Alexander Macmillan (publisher), grandfather of Harold Macmillan (the prime minister)
- Dave MacMillan (1886–1963), American basketball coach
- Dave McMillan (racing driver) (born 1944), New Zealand former racing driver
- David MacMillan (born 1968), Scottish born professor of organic chemistry
- David McMillan (footballer) (born 1988), Irish footballer
- Donald Baxter MacMillan (1874–1970), American explorer
- Duncan MacMillan (disambiguation), multiple people
- Dwan McMillan (born 1989), American basketball coach
- Edwin McMillan (1907–1991), American chemist and Nobel Prize winner
- Edmund McMillen (born 1980), American video game designer and artist
- Edward B. McMillan, Canadian politician
- Ernest MacMillan (1893–1973), Canadian musician
- Ethel McMillan (1904–1987), New Zealand politician
- Evan McMillan (born 1988), Irish footballer
- Francis MacMillen (1885–1973), American violinist
- Frank McMillan (1899–1966), Australian rugby league footballer
- Frew McMillan (born 1942), South African tennis player
- George McMillan (disambiguation), multiple people
- Gervan McMillan (1904–1951), New Zealand politician
- Gloria McMillan (1933–2022), American actress
- Gordon McMillan (1927–2021), American ice hockey player
- Gordon McMillan (born c. 1953), South African cricket and badminton player
- Gordon MacMillan (1897–1986), British World War II general and hereditary chief of the Clan MacMillan
- Graham McMillan (born 1936), soccer player
- Hammy McMillan (born 1963), Scottish world champion curler
- Harold Macmillan (1894–1986), British politician, Prime Minister of the United Kingdom 1957–63
- Harry MacMillan, Scottish footballer
- Helen E. McMillan (1909–1984), American politician
- Herbert H. McMillan (born 1958), American politician
- H. R. MacMillan (1885–1976), Canadian forester
- Ian McMillan (born 1956), British poet
- J. Douglas MacMillan (1933–1991), Scottish pastor
- James McMillan (disambiguation), multiple people
- John McMillan (disambiguation), multiple people
- Judith McMillan (born 1945), American artist
- Keith B. McMullin (born 1941), LDS (Mormon) general authority emeritus and CEO, DMC
- Kenneth G. McMillan (born 1942), American politician
- Sir Kenneth MacMillan (1929–1992), Scottish-born choreographer
- Kirkpatrick Macmillan (1812–1878), Scottish blacksmith who invented the rear-wheel-driven bicycle
- Lachie McMillan (1900–1983), Scottish footballer
- Logan MacMillan (born 1989), Canadian ice hockey player
- Marcia MacMillan (born 1970), Canadian news anchor
- Margaret MacMillan (born 1943), Canadian historian
- Margaret McMillan (1860–1931), nursery education pioneer
- Mary McMillan (1880–1959), American physical therapist
- Michael McMillan (born 1962), British playwright, artist/curator and educator
- Nate McMillan (born 1964), former NBA player and coach of the Indiana Pacers
- Norman MacMillan (disambiguation), multiple people
- Nolan MacMillan, (born 1990), current CFL player
- Paul F. McMillan, (1956–2022), chemist and high pressure scientist
- Priscilla Johnson McMillan (1928–2021), American writer and journalist
- Quintin McMillan (1904–1948), South African cricketer
- Raekwon McMillan (born 1995), American football player
- Reece MacMillan (born 1996), English boxer
- Robert McMillan (disambiguation), several person
- Steve McMillan (disambiguation), multiple people
- Tetairoa McMillan (born 2003), American football player
- Thomas McMillan (disambiguation), multiple people
- William MacMillan (disambiguation), multiple people
- Whitney MacMillan (1929–2020), American businessman

== Fictional characters ==
- Trillian (character), or Tricia McMillan, character in The Hitchhiker's Guide to the Galaxy
- Ernie Macmillan, character in the Harry Potter book series
- Captain MacMillan, SAS sniper presiding over at the time Lt. Price in the 2007 video game Call of Duty 4: Modern Warfare
- Stewart and Sally McMillan, title roles in the television series McMillan & Wife
- Joe MacMillan, character in the AMC TV series Halt and Catch Fire
- Carl McMillan, partner of Mike Biggs, TV sitcom Mike & Molly
- N. McMillan, a character in the manga Black Butler
