= Bruce McMillan (disambiguation) =

Bruce McMillan (born 1947) is an American author.

Bruce McMillan may also refer to:

- Bruce H. McMillan (born 1935), American politician
- Bruce McMillan (sport shooter) (born 1942), New Zealand sportsman

== See also ==
- McMillan (disambiguation)
- McMillan (surname)
