= Pariah state =

Nation considered to be an outcast

A pariah state (also called an international pariah or a global pariah) is a nation considered to be an outcast in the international community. A pariah state may face international isolation, sanctions, or even an invasion by nations that find its policies, actions, or even its very existence unacceptable. A pariah state often violates peremptory norms, facing restricted commerce and diplomatic expulsions. Consequently, a pariah state may face economic decline and other crises that cause loss of government control or reckless behavior, making the term associated with failed states or rogue states.

== Background ==
Until recent centuries, the authority to designate a nation as a pariah state was relatively clear, often resting with religious authorities. With the Peace of Westphalia, the Ottoman Empire was regarded as a pariah state until the nineteenth century on a "religious basis." Recently, however, the criteria for and implications of pariah statehood, as well as the designating authorities, have become the subject of disagreement. Olawale Lawal, a Nigerian scholar from Lagos State University, has stated:

There are so many open questions on the issue of Pariah State. For instance who determines a Pariah State and how a nation becomes a Pariah State... This becomes more profound when one realizes that a nation that is an outcast in one region, has diplomatic and friendly relations with others.

By some criteria, nations can be considered pariahs within their own neighborhood of surrounding states. By other criteria, an international body (such as the United Nations) or perhaps a consensus among certain nations may govern the meaning or use of the term.

== Etymology ==
The word "pariah" derives from Paraiyar, a large indigenous tribal group of the Indian state of Tamil Nadu. Under the Indian caste system, the Paraiyar were members of the lowest caste, which were called the "outcastes". Since its first recorded use in English in 1613, cultures worldwide have accepted the term "pariah" to mean "outcast".

== Definitions ==
A pariah state, defined in its simplest terms, is an outcast state. This is not a new term in the lexicon of International Relations, nor is it a new historical concept. What is new, however, is what Lawal refers to as "the basis for Pariahood appellation." Other definitions have been advanced that expand this basis (see next section below), or perhaps add more academic nuance, which may vary by author or the author's field of study. These definitions are here grouped into two categories: definitions focusing on the lack (or disadvantage) the pariah state objectively suffers from, and definitions focusing on the political justification - given by other nations - for why that pariah state "deserves" their extraordinary attitude towards it.

The first type of definitions is well exemplified by Bellany's definition, according to which a pariah state is "A state lacking any significant soft power." Similarly, The Penguin Dictionary of International Relations defines the pariah states as "international States/actors which, by virtue of their political systems, ideological postures, leadership or general behavior, suffer from diplomatic isolation and widespread global moral opprobrium." This definition, as the previous one, does not indicate what kind of political system, ideological posture, leadership or general behavior, is ascribed to the pariah state by the other nations.

The second type of definitions is most simply exemplified by Weiss's definition, according to which pariah states are "states that violate international norms." Similarly, Harkavy offers, "A Pariah State is one whose conduct is considered to be out of line with international norms of behavior." Geldenhuys gives a more detailed definition of that type: "A pariah (or outcast) country is one whose domestic or international behaviour seriously offends the world community or at least a significant group of states." Marks's definition elaborates more: a pariah state is "a state with provocative policies or expansionary territorial ambitions, measures of the absence of diplomatic relations with neighboring states or the situational harm posed to other states if the state in question acquired nuclear weapons."

== Criteria for pariah statehood ==
As of August 2014, no internationally accepted criteria exist for designating a nation as a pariah state, nor is there any single accepted authority for doing so. Some criteria are proposed in the definitions offered in the previous section. For example, Harkavy and Marks make reference in their definitions to the international behavior of a nation in order to qualify it for pariahood. Marks goes one step further and includes the question of nuclear weapons in his criteria, while Weiss adds "a state’s defiant existence in the face of international non-recognition.". However, Bellany's sole criterion is a lack of soft power, while the Penguin Dictionary of International Relations requires that the pariah states also "suffer from diplomatic isolation and widespread global moral opprobrium".

Left-wing political commentator and activist Noam Chomsky declared in 2003 and again in 2014 that the United States had become a pariah state. Both declarations were based on both the United States's leading violation of international laws and results from Gallup polls showing that only 10 percent of people around the world supported the Iraq War and that 24 percent of people in the world believed the United States represented the greatest threat to world peace. Such poll results are not listed among objective criteria advanced by academic sources, international authorities or NGOs, or any governing bodies as criteria for designation as a pariah state, and Geldenhuys argues that major world powers by definition cannot be pariah states because they cannot be isolated or harmed politically or economically, or brought into compliance with international norms by pariah designations, whether by individuals or international governing bodies. Mary Ellen O'Connell, a professor of international law at the University of Notre Dame, explains that there has been a decline in the respect towards international law in the United States from our highest government officials to the person on the street because of the misunderstood belief that the laws are in practice not enforceable.

Lawal distinguishes between subjective and objective designations. Subjective designation can also exist on a national level, according to the interests and values of the designating nation. If the designating nation is powerful enough, the designation of pariah statehood can become objective based on the amount of pressure the designating state can apply to gain international consensus. Such was the case, according to Lawal, when the United States used its strength within the Western Bloc to impose pariah status on Fidel Castro's Cuba instead of acting unilaterally through foreign policy, with no objective need to impose international pariah status. Lawal explains that the United States' problem with Cuba was geographical more than ideological, as Cuba was no further from the United States on the political spectrum than the Soviet Union was at the time, but the Soviets had attempted to establish nuclear missile launch facilities in Cuba, within 99 miles (159 km) of the United States coastline.

Lawal has summarized four primary categories often used for qualification as pariah states: 1) nations that possess or use weapons of mass destruction in contravention of existing treaties, 2) nations that support terrorism, 3) nations lacking democracy, and 4) nations with a record of human rights violations. To these four criteria, Geldenhuys adds another two: 5) nations that promote radical ideologies at home or even abroad (clarified as "exporting revolution"), and 6) nations that commit acts of military aggression abroad. In addition to these six categories of state conduct that can result in objective designation as a pariah state, Geldenhuys suggests a seventh category that might gain international consensus: nations that are involved in international drug trafficking. (Note: This paper was published in 1997. Therefore, academic consensus on this issue may have been reached (or failed) already.)

According to Lawal, international law can serve as objective criteria. For example, nations that violate the Nuclear Non-Proliferation Treaty are often sanctioned for their actions. Such sanctions can include designation as a pariah state, as has been the approach used by the United States. (Note: Lawal acknowledges in his paper that there is a great deal of overlap between the definitions of "pariah states" and "rogue states". Weiss (2012) refers to this as "The US's Rogue State policy.") However, international law can fail in this regard, as under the current international system, most nation-states recognize their own legal supremacy over the laws of any international governing body. Thus, according to Lawal, consensus under international law can be problematic. In the case of nuclear arms development, international isolation can have a paradoxical "push effect" on a pariah state, motivating accelerated development of nuclear weapons.

As there is no consensus or provision in international law for pariah status, the choice of criteria necessary to invoke the term is subjective, and the term is pejorative.

== Common characteristics ==
Geldenhuys has identified four common characteristics shared by many pariah states that are unrelated to any actions of international deviance that might have qualified them as pariahs under the various criteria.

The first is that pariah states tend to lack a strong national identity. Geldenhuys cites Iraq as an example. Iraq is a relatively young nation-state with "artificial borders." Saddam Hussein's ruling Ba'ath Party denied that Iraqis formed a nation. Rather, they maintained that Iraqis (excluding Kurds) were part of a larger Arab nation.

The second characteristic is that, although they are not necessarily small, pariah states cannot be "regarded as a major power in world terms." Certainly there are individuals who disagree with this second characteristic, such as Noam Chomsky (cited above) and author-journalist Robert Parry, each of whom have applied their own personal criteria to describe the United States as a pariah state.

The third characteristic noted by Geldenhuys is that pariah states tend to develop a siege mentality. Similar to the "push effect" (described above regarding sanctions against nations developing nuclear arms), this siege mentality can motivate pariah states to develop costly and ambitious arms programs.

Finally, pariah states tend to develop resentments against the established world order. They may seek to subvert the international status quo. These characteristics are presented as generalizations and are not intended by the author to apply to every pariah state.

== See also ==
- Cordon sanitaire (international relations)
- Isolationism
- List of states with limited recognition
