= McMillen =

McMillen or MacMillen is a surname. The origin of the name derives from the origin of the Scottish Clan MacMillan; see also the similar surname McMillan. Notable people with the surname include:

- Andrew McMillen (born c. 1988), Australian journalist
- Andrew Robinson McMillen, Canadian politician
- Billy McMillen (1920–1975), Irish republican
- Bob McMillen (1928–2007), American athlete
- Bob McMillen (born 1970), American football player and coach
- Clara McMillen (1898–1982), American biologist
- Dale W. McMillen (1880–1971), American businessman
- Edmund McMillen (born 1980), American video game designer
- Jim McMillen (1902–1984), American football player
- Loring McMillen (1906–1991), American engineer and historian
- Louis A. McMillen (1916–1998), American architect
- Neil R. McMillen, American historian
- Rolla C. McMillen (1880–1961), American politician
- Thomas Roberts McMillen (1916–2002), American judge
- Tom McMillen (born 1952), American basketball player and politician
- Walter McMillen (1913–1987), Northern Irish footballer
- William L. McMillen (1829–1902), American physician and politician

== See also ==
- Moore-McMillen House, historic home on Staten Island, New York, United States
- McMillen High School, high school in Texas, United States
