= James McMillin (disambiguation) =

Jim or James McMillin may refer to:

- James McMillin (slave trader) (1806–1857), American tavern keeper, a/k/a James McMillan or James McMillen
- James McMillin (rower) (1914–2005), American gold medalist at 1936 Olympics
- Jim McMillin (1937–2023), American football defensive back

== See also ==
- James McMillan (disambiguation)
