= McMillan =

MacMillan, Macmillan, McMillen or McMillan may refer to:

== People ==
- McMillan (surname)
- Clan MacMillan, a Highland Scottish clan

== Places ==
=== Australia ===
- Division of McMillan, electoral district in Australian House of Representatives in Victoria

=== Canada ===
- Macmillan River, a river in the Yukon Territory of northwestern Canada
- MacMillan Provincial Park, a provincial park in British Columbia, Canada

=== United States ===
- McMillan Mesa, a mesa in Flagstaff, Coconino County, Arizona.
- McMillan, Michigan
- McMillan Township, Luce County, Michigan
- McMillan Township, Ontonagon County, Michigan
- McMillan, Oklahoma, an unincorporated community
- McMillan, Texas, an unincorporated community
- McMillan, Wisconsin, a town
- McMillan (community), Wisconsin, an unincorporated community
- McMillan Reservoir in Washington, D.C.

== Companies and organizations ==
- McMillan (agency), a Canadian creative agency
- Macmillan Cancer Support, a British charity
- McMillan Hotels, a hotel group
- McMillan LLP, a Canadian law firm
- McMillan Firearms Manufacturing
  - McMillan TAC-50, a sniper rifle
- Macmillan Publishers, a multinational publishing group
  - Macmillan Inc., a now mostly defunct American publishing company
- Macmillan of Canada, a Canadian publishing house.
- MacMillan Bloedel, a Canadian forestry company
- Macmillan Academy, an academy in Middlesbrough, North Yorkshire, England
- Palgrave Macmillan, a British academic and trade publishing company

== Other uses ==
- MacMillan (crater)
- McMillan & Wife, a 1970s television series
- McMillan Plan, a 1901 development plan for Washington, D.C.
- Captain MacMillan, a character from the 2007 video game Call of Duty 4: Modern Warfare
