= Steve McMillan =

Steve or Stephen McMillan may refer to:

- Steve McMillan (footballer) (born 1976), Scottish footballer
- Steve McMillan (politician) (1941–2022), American politician
- Stephen McMillan (actor), Scottish actor

== See also ==
- Stephen P. MacMillan, American businessman, CEO of Hologic
- C. Steven McMillan, American businessman, CEO of the Sara Lee Corporation
