= Paul S. Davies =

British jurist

Professor Paul S Davies

Chair in Commercial Law, UCL
- Incumbent
- Assumed office September 2017

Personal details
- Born: Paul S Davies
- Education: University of Cambridge; University of Poitiers
- Occupation: Barrister, legal academic

Paul S Davies is an English barrister and academic notable for having been published in many areas of private law, particularly commercial law. He has been the chair in Commercial Law at the Faculty of Laws, University College London since 2017 and has practised as a barrister at Essex Court Chambers since 2021.

== Education ==
Raised in Mansfield, Nottinghamshire, Davies was admitted to Downing College, Cambridge to read Oriental Studies, with a focus on Japanese studies. He later switched to reading Law at the same college, and completed a Diploma in French Legal Studies at the University of Poitiers before graduating with Firsts in both Oriental Studies and Law in 2007. His graduating mark in law was the highest since 1986.

In 2017, he was awarded a doctorate in law from the University of Cambridge by special regulations.

== Academic career ==
Davies was a research assistant at the Law Commission's Property, Trust and Family Law Team between 2007 and 2008. He then joined the Faculty of Law at the University of Cambridge and was appointed as a Fellow at Gonville and Caius College, and later the Newton Trust Lecturer in Law.

Between 2014 and 2016, he was a visiting professor at KU Leuven.

In 2013, he was appointed as a Fellow at St Catherine's College, Oxford, where he taught until assuming his present post at UCL in 2017. His inaugural lecture at UCL was titled "Bad Bargains" and was chaired by Lord Sales.

He is an academic member of the Chancery Bar Association.

In 2020, Davies was awarded the Philip Leverhulme Prize for his work on private law.

=== Publications ===
==== Judicially-cited ====
Many of Davies' publications have been cited judicially by Commonwealth courts, including those in England and Wales, Singapore, Australia, New Zealand, and Canada.

In Marks and Spencer v BNP Paribas [2015] UKSC 72, the UK Supreme Court cited Davies' article, "Recent developments in the Law of Implied Terms" [2010] Lloyds' Maritime and Commercial Law Quarterly 140, at [24] and [64], and expressed support for the criticism in that article of Lord Hoffmann's judgment in the earlier case of AG of Belize v Belize Telecom [2009] UKPC 10. These criticisms were also drawn on by the Singapore Court of Appeal in Foo Jong Peng v Phua Kiah Mai [2012] SGCA 55 justifying its decision not to follow Belize Telecom.

Davies' work on contractual rectification was cited by the Court of Appeal in England & Wales in FSHC Group Holdings v Glas Trust Corporation [2019] EWCA Civ 1361.https://www.bailii.org/ew/cases/EWCA/Civ/2019/1361.html and was described by Lord Justice Leggatt (now Lord Leggatt), as "particularly helpful".

In Group Seven v Notable Services [2019] EWCA Civ 614, the Court of Appeal cited Davies' monograph on dishonest assistance (Accessory Liability (2015)) with approval.

==== Books ====
- Accessory Liability (Hart Publishing, 2015) - awarded the Inner Temple Book Prize 2018, which rewards outstanding contributions to the understanding of law. It was also joint second for the 2015 Society of Legal Scholars Peter Birks Book Prize for Outstanding Legal Scholarship, and was shortlisted for the St Petersburg International Legal Forum Private Law Prize.
- Equity and Trusts: Text, Cases and Materials (OUP, 2018) - co-authored with Graham Virgo QC
- Defences in Equity (Hart, 2018) - co-edited with James Goudkamp
- JC Smith's Law of Contract (OUP, 2021)

==== Articles ====
- "The Mental Element of Accessory Liability" (2021) 137 Law Quarterly Review
- "Excluding the Contracts (Rights of Third Parties) Act 1999" (2021) 137 Law Quarterly Review 101
- "Bad Bargains" [2019] Current Legal Problems 253
- "The Basis of Good Faith" [2019] Journal of Commonwealth Law 1

== Legal practice ==
Davies began his pupillage at Essex Court Chambers on 1 September 2020 and qualified as a barrister on 1 November 2020. He has been a tenant at Essex Court Chambers since 4 February 2021.
