= James McMillan =

James (or Jim or Jimmy) McMillan or MacMillan may refer to:

== Sportspeople ==
- James McMillan (footballer, born c. 1866) (c. 1866–?), played for Sunderland
- James McMillan (footballer, born 1869) (1869–1937), played for Scotland, Everton and St Bernard's
- James McMillan (Scottish footballer), played for Notts County
- Jim McMillan (Canadian football) (born 1952), American football player
- Jim McMillan (speedway rider) (born 1945), Scottish motorcycle speedway rider
- James McMillan (cricketer) (born 1978), New Zealand cricketer

== Musicians ==
- James MacMillan (born 1959), Scottish composer
- James McMillan (trumpeter), British jazz trumpeter, record producer and founder and owner of Quietmoney Recordings

== Politicians ==
- James McMillan (politician) (1838–1902), U.S. Senator from Michigan
- James Bryan McMillan (1916–1995), U.S. federal judge
- Jimmy McMillan (born 1946), U.S. fringe politician, founder of Rent Is Too Damn High Party
- James E. McMillan (died 1907), mayor of Victoria, British Columbia
- Jim McMillan (Florida Sheriff) (born 1937), Jacksonville Sheriff

== Other ==
- James McMillan (fur trader) (1783–1858), founder of Fort Langley, British Columbia
- James W. McMillan (1825–1903), Union officer during the American Civil War
- Lynching of Jim McMillan on June 18, 1919, in Alabama
- James Francis McMillan (1948–2010), Scottish historian and author
- J. W. McMillan (brick manufacturer) (1850–1925), Scottish brick manufacturer in the American South
