= Doctor of Philosophy by publication =

Method of awarding an academic degree

A Doctor of Philosophy by publication (also known as a Ph.D. by Published Work, PhD by portfolio or Ph.D. under Special Regulation; also a thesis by publication, a thesis with publications, a publication-based thesis, an articles-based thesis, a manuscript-style dissertation, a compilation thesis and a journal format thesis) is a manner of awarding a Ph.D. degree offered by some universities in which a series of articles usually with a common theme are published in scholarly, peer-reviewed journals to meet the requirements for the degree, in lieu of presentation of a final dissertation. It is a type of thesis by published works, a practice originating in Germany in the 19th century. Many PhD by Publication programs require the submission of a formal thesis and a viva voce.

== Program ==
In general, awarding of the Ph.D. requires an original contribution to human knowledge. This is typically achieved through a period of research culminating in the presentation and examination of a major dissertation on an approved subject, and may be preceded by one or more years of formal coursework on research methodology and academic writing. A Ph.D. awarded "by publication", by contrast, may not require any formal coursework and does not necessitate preparation of a dissertation. Instead, the candidate proves the past publication of several quality articles in peer-reviewed, scholarly journals which, in the opinion of the degree-granting university, represent an original contribution to human knowledge equal to that which would be demonstrated by a dissertation. Notwithstanding many PhD by Publication programs require a viva voce, and the submission of a formal thesis.

The PhD by publication may involve either the demonstration of work previously published prior to application to the program, or the achievement of publications during the period of enrollment, or some combination of the two.

In a 2018 study, it was found that recent doctorates awarded by publication in Australia involved the publication of an average of 4.5 journal articles, though some individuals were awarded with as few as one article published, and others with as many as twelve.

=== Examples ===
At the University of Cambridge the doctor of philosophy may be awarded "under the special regulations" only to alumni of Cambridge who can prove the publication of works constituting "a significant contribution to scholarship" and to which are appended an original statement "summarizing the rationale behind the works submitted". Like conventional doctoral students, the candidate must present an oral defense of his or her work before a committee of examiners. According to the university, "the standard required for the PhD Degree under the Special Regulations is the same for the PhD Degree awarded to a Graduate Student on the submission of a dissertation embodying the results of three years of research".

== History ==
In the United Kingdom, PhD by publication was officially first adopted by the University of Cambridge in 1966, but was informally practiced decades earlier: Florence Nightingale David was awarded a doctorate for four papers in 1938, while Ludwig Wittgenstein was awarded one for his book Tractatus Logico-Philosophicus in 1929.

In Sweden, when PhD was introduced instead of licentiate in 1969, it already was allowed to defend a thesis by publication. In the US, the "published-article option" was quite widely available in sciences by 1991. It was also practiced in Japan, where an example of such a PhD was 2014 Nobel laureate Shuji Nakamura, awarded doctorate in 1994 by the University of Tokushima.

As of 1997, the practice was not uncommon all over Europe, and besides Sweden, well-established in Belgium and the Netherlands.

== Notable recipients ==
Notable recipients of a PhD by publication, and their awarding bodies, include:

=== Germany ===
- Ana Castillo (University of Bremen)

=== Japan ===
- Shuji Nakamura (University of Tokushima)

=== United Kingdom ===
- Josephine Balmer (University of East Anglia)
- Christopher Catherwood (University of East Anglia)
- Celia Brayfield (Brunel University)
- Bryn Harrison (University of Huddersfield)
- Graham Joyce (Nottingham Trent University)
- Wendy McMurdo (University of Westminster)

==== University of Cambridge ====
- Peter Bellwood
- Paul S Davies
- Aubrey de Grey
- Simon Heffer
- Alexander Macmillan
- John Mulvaney
- Mary Ellen O'Connell
