= William MacMillan =

William MacMillan or McMillan may refer to:

- William Duncan MacMillan (1871–1948), American mathematician and astronomer
- William Duncan MacMillan (businessman), American businessman
- William J. P. MacMillan (1881–1957), Canadian physician and Prince Edward Island politician
- William McMillan (congressman) (1764–1804), delegate to the United States Congress from the Territory Northwest of the River Ohio
- William McMillan (college president) (1777–1832), president of Jefferson College, 1817–1822
- William McMillan (sculptor) (1887–1977), British sculptor and medal-designer
- William McMillan (Australian politician) (1850–1926), Irish-Australian politician, first Member for Wentworth
- William McMillan (sport shooter) (1929–2000), American sports shooter and Olympic Champion
- William Hector McMillan (1892–1974), Liberal party member of the Canadian House of Commons
- William McMillan (footballer, born 1872) (1872–1929), Scottish wing half who played for Southampton and Burnley in the late 1890s
- William McMillan (footballer, born 1876) (1876–1958), Scottish full back/centre half who played for Lincoln City in the 1890s/1900s
- William Macmillan (minister) (1927–2002), Moderator of the General Assembly of the Church of Scotland
- William Miller Macmillan (1885–1974), Scottish historian
- William L. McMillan (1936–1984), American physicist
- Will McMillan (1944–2015), American actor
- William Hutchison McMillan (1886–1947), Scottish mining engineer
- William Northrup McMillan (1872–1925), American-born Kenyan settler, adventurer, and philanthropist

== See also ==
- Billy McMillan (disambiguation)
