= Alexander Macmillan =

Alexander Macmillan may refer to:

- Alexander MacMillan (publisher) (1818–1896), co-founder of Macmillan Publishers
- Alexander Macmillan, 2nd Earl of Stockton (born 1943), descendant and former chairman of Macmillan Publishers
- Alexander Hugh Macmillan (1877–1966), member of the Watch Tower Bible & Tract Society Board of Directors in 1918
- Alexander Stirling MacMillan (1871–1955), Canadian politician in Nova Scotia
- Alex McMillan (born 1932), American politician from North Carolina
- Alexander McMillan (North Carolina politician) (died 1817), American politician from North Carolina
- Alexander McMillan (Wisconsin pioneer) (1825–1901), American politician in Wisconsin
- Alexander Macmillan (born 1927), Canadian engineer
