= Robert McMillan =

Robert McMillan may refer to:

- Robert S. McMillan (architect) (1916–2001), architect and co-founder of The Architects Collaborative
- Robert S. McMillan (astronomer) (born 1950), astronomer at the University of Arizona
- Robert McMillan (Australian judge) (1858–1931), Chief Justice of the Supreme Court of Western Australia
- Robert Johnston McMillan (1885–1941), U.S. federal judge
- Robert McMillan (farmer) (1887–1962), member of the New Zealand Legislative Council
- Robert McMillan (footballer) (1857–1928), Welsh footballer
- Robert MacMillan (1865–1936), Scottish national rugby union player
- Bob MacMillan (born 1952), Canadian hockey player and politician
- Robert Macmillan (1921–2015), British mechanical engineer

== See also ==
- Robbie Coltrane (actually Anthony Robert McMillan, 1950–2022), Scottish actor
- McMillan (surname)
