= Josephine Balmer =

British poet and translator (born 1959)

Josephine Balmer (born 1959) is a British poet, translator of classics and literary critic. She sets the daily Word Watch and weekly Literary Quiz for The Times.

She was born in 1959 in Hampshire and now lives in East Sussex. She studied classics at University College, London and was awarded a PhD degree by publication by the University of East Anglia.

She was Chair of the British Translators' Association from 2002–2005, and reviews editor of the journal Modern Poetry in Translation from 2004–2009. She was a judge of poetry translation for the Stephen Spender Prize in 2006–2009 and 2015.

In 1989 her translation Sappho: Poems and Fragments was shortlisted for the inaugural US Lambda Literary Awards. In 2017 her collection The Paths of Survival was shortlisted for the London Hellenic Prize.

== Works ==
- Sappho: Poems and Fragments (1984, 1988 & 1992)
- Classical Women Poets (1996)
- Catullus: Poems of Love and Hate (2004)
- Chasing Catullus: Poems, Translations and Transgressions (2004)
- The Word for Sorrow (2008)
- Piecing Together the Fragments: Translating Classical Verse, Creating Contemporary Poetry (2013)
- The Paths of Survival (2017)
- Letting Go: thirty mourning sonnets and two poems (2017)
- Sappho: Poems and Fragments New Expanded Edition (2018)
- Ghost Passage (2022)
