= Thomas McMillen =

Thomas or Tom McMillen may refer to:

- Thomas Richard McMillen or Thomas Haden Church (born 1960), American actor, director, and writer
- Thomas Roberts McMillen (1916–2012), U.S. district judge
- Tom McMillen (born 1952), American former politician and basketball player

== See also ==
- Thomas McMillan (disambiguation)
- Tom McMillin (2000s–2010s), Michigan politician
