= Christopher Catherwood =

British author

Christopher Catherwood, FRAS, FRGS, FRHistS (born 1 March 1955) is a British author based in Cambridge, England, and, often, in Richmond, Virginia. He has taught for the Institute of Continuing Education based a few miles away in Madingley and has taught for many years for the School of Continuing Education at the University of Richmond. He has been associated each summer with the University of Richmond's History Department, where he is its annual summer Writer in Residence, and where most of his recent books have been written.

== History ==
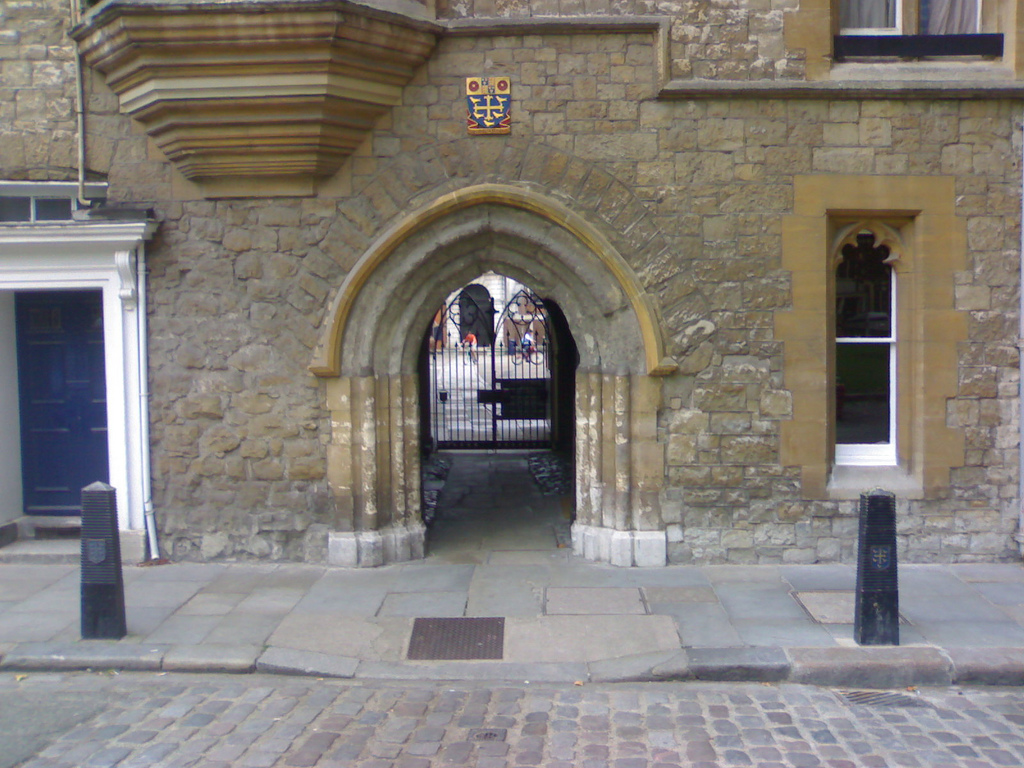
Westminster School

He is the son of Sir Fred Catherwood. He was educated at Westminster School, Balliol College, Oxford, Sidney Sussex College, Cambridge, and the University of East Anglia where he obtained a PhD degree by publication. Since 1994 he has been linked to St Edmund's College, Cambridge.

In December 2008, he appeared as a cameo character in the online novel Corduroy Mansions by Alexander McCall Smith, who wrote a positive review of his book on Churchill's creation of Iraq in The New York Times.

In 2008 he was an SCR Associate of Churchill College, Cambridge, at which college he was the Archives By-Fellow for Lent Term 2008 for his work on Winston Churchill and the Second World War.

== Selected works ==
- Five Evangelical Leaders (Hodder and Stoughton in the UK and for Harold Shaw in the US)
- Martyn Lloyd-Jones A Family Portrait (Kingsway in the UK and Baker Book House in the US, 1995)
- Why the Nations Rage (Hodder and Stoughton in the UK in 1997 and a new academic edition with Rowman & Littlefield in the US in 2002)
- A Crash Course in Church History (Hodder and Stoughton in the UK 1997 and new edition in the US with Crossway 2007)
- Five Leading Reformers (CFP 2000)
- The Balkans in World War II (Palgrave 2003)
- Christians, Muslims, and Islamic Rage (Zondervan 2003)
- Churchill's Folly: How Winston Churchill Created Iraq (Carroll and Graf, in the USA 2004: called Winston's Folly with Constable in the UK in 2004)
- A Brief History of the Middle East (Carroll and Graf in the US and Constable in the UK, 2006)
- A God Divided (Victor, 2007)
- "Making War in the Name of God" (Citadel Press, 2007)
- Winston Churchill: The Flawed Genius of World War II (Penguin, New York, 2009)
- His Finest Hour: A Biography of Winston Churchill (Skyhorse Publishing, New York, 2010; published in the UK by Constable and Robinson, London as His Finest Hour: A Brief Life of Winston Churchill
- The Evangelicals (Crossway Books, Wheaton IL, 2010)
- "The Second World War: A Beginner's Guide" (Oneworld Publications, 2014)
- Martyn Lloyd-Jones: His Life and Relevance for the 21st Century. (Crossway Books, Wheaton IL, 2015)
- Churchill and Tito: SOE, Bletchley Park and Supporting the Yugoslav Communists in World War II (Frontline Books. 2017)
