= C. Steven McMillan =

American businessman

C. Steven McMillan is an American businessman. He was chief executive officer of the Sara Lee Corporation from 2000 to 2005.

== Biography ==
=== Early life ===
He grew up in Troy, Alabama. He graduated from Auburn University summa cum laude and served in the United States Navy. He then went on to receive an M.B.A. form the Harvard Business School, where he was a Baker Scholar.

=== Career ===
He began his career at McKinsey & Company as a Management Consultant in Chicago. In 1976, he became president and CEO of Aqualux Water Processing Company, and in 1982, president and CEO of Electrolux.

He joined the Sara Lee Corporation as senior vice president in 1986, and became executive vice president in 1993. He was president from 1997 to 2000, president and chief operating officer from 2000 to 2004, chief executive officer from July 2000 to February 2005, and chairman of the board from October 2001 to October 2005. He also was on the board of directors of the Grocery Manufacturers Association, Electrolux and Morris Shirazi.

He sits on the board of directors of Monsanto. He is a member of the Chicago Council on Foreign Relations, the Economic Club of Chicago, Catalyst, The Business Council, the Business Roundtable, the Executives' Club of Chicago, and the civic committee of the Commercial Club of Chicago. He sits on the advisory boards of the Sarah W. Stedman Nutrition and Metabolism Center of the Duke University School of Medicine and the Kellogg School of Management at Northwestern University. He also sits on the board of trustees of the Chicago Symphony Orchestra.

=== Personal life ===
He is twice divorced, and has two daughters.

Brenda Jarvis filed suit against Sara Lee Corp. and its then-chief executive McMillan in 2004, alleging that McMillan flew her to Chicago, offered her a job, had sex with her and later rescinded the employment offer after she turned down a second encounter. The company confirmed the pair had sexual intercourse but denied that McMillan offered Jarvis a job. The suit was settled later that year, and the terms were undisclosed.
