= Bruce H. McMillan =

American politician from Wyoming

Member of the Wyoming House of Representatives
- In office 1973–1981

Personal details
- Born: April 14, 1935 (age 91) Cheyenne, Wyoming, U.S.
- Party: Republican
- Occupation: businessman

Bruce H. McMillan (born April 15, 1935) was an American politician in the state of Wyoming. He served in the Wyoming House of Representatives as a member of the Republican Party. He attended the University of Wyoming and was a businessman in the agriculture industry.
