= International isolation =

Penalty toward a nation

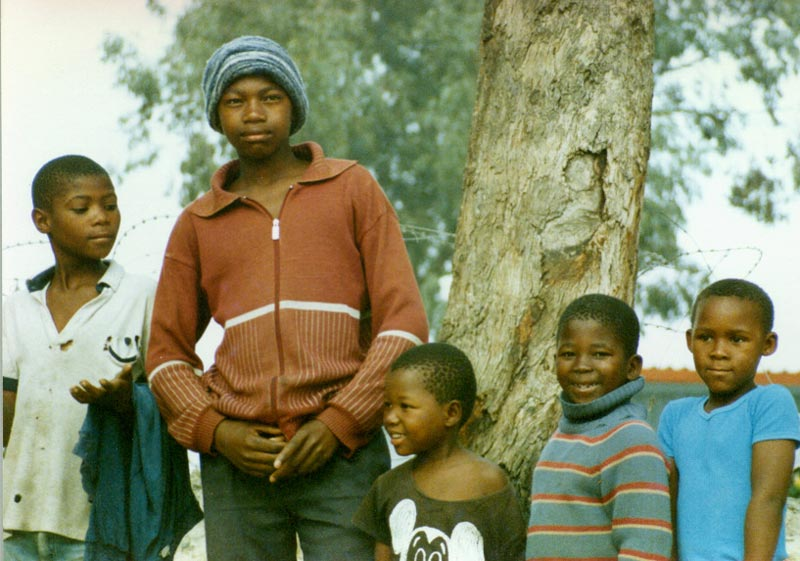
Poverty among dispossessed groups of society is usually one of the effects of international isolation. Children in a South African township in 1989, during the country's international isolation years.

International isolation is a penalty applied by the international community or a sizeable or powerful group of countries, like the United Nations, towards one nation, government or group of people. The same term may also refer to the state a country finds itself in after being shunned by the international community of nations or the greater group of countries. The determinants of the greater group of countries rely on economic, political and cultural stability but since the global order is constantly changing with the rise of developing countries such grouping may change.

== Definitions ==
International isolation is often the result of international sanctions against a specific country (or group of countries), but it may also be a result of a policy of isolationism by the country in question. Libya under Muammar Gaddafi, for example, ended up in a state of international isolation after decades of confrontation with the West and its critical politics against fellow Arab governments.

Certain widely acknowledged terms or concepts, like "pariah state", have been coined to refer to countries that have isolated themselves internationally or have been isolated by sizable groups of nations. The characteristics of such a state are "...precarious diplomatic isolation, the absence of assured, credible security support or political moorings within big-power alliance structures, and ... [being] the targets of obsessive and unrelenting opprobrium and censure within international forums such as the United Nations."

The concept "falling off the map" was used by Trinidadian-British political writer V. S. Naipaul in reference to the growing international isolation of the Islamic Republic of Iran after being in the limelight during the times of Shah Rezā Pahlavi and during the first years of the Revolution.

== History ==
International isolation contributed to the downfall of the Spanish Republican government following the Non-Intervention Agreement in the Spanish Civil War signed in August 1936 and supported by 24 nations. The Republic had to fight a war under virtually total international isolation and a de facto economic embargo that placed it at an insurmountable disadvantage against the rebel faction. Lacking badly needed assistance from the democratic powers such as France, the United Kingdom, and the United States, the Spanish Republic was subject to a severe form of international isolation between 1936, shortly after the rebel coup, and the defeat of the loyalist forces in 1939. Maritime access for material from the Soviet Union—the only country, together with Mexico, which defied the Non-intervention Pact— aid was effectively cut off by the attacks of Italian submarines and the French frontier remained closed. Although imposed in the name of neutrality, the international isolation of the Spanish Republic ended up favouring the interests of the future Axis powers.

One of the most famous examples of international isolation was South Africa during the Apartheid years. While poverty is usually one of the results of international isolation, the elite in the Republic of South Africa was able to maintain its status and wealth, the most economically disadvantaged classes bearing the brunt of the situation.

Myanmar, an isolated state owing to its harsh stratocracy, has one of the world's poorest healthcare systems despite the abundance of natural resources in the country.

Throughout the 2011 Libyan civil war, a number of powerful countries pushed for the international isolation of colonel Muammar Gaddafi's Libyan Jamahiriya. International pressure, along with assistance to rebel groups, eventually contributed to Gaddafi's downfall and death. Also, in the 2011-2012 Syrian uprising, several foreign countries imposed tough sanctions against the regime of President Bashar al-Assad.

With the increasing democratic backsliding and autocracy in Venezuela during the administration of Nicolás Maduro, the country faced growing international isolation.

Since the 2022 invasion of Ukraine, Russia has experienced international isolation, characterized by severe economic sanctions against prominent government figures and oligarchs, their expulsion from the Council of Europe, and a boycott of Russia and Belarus.

The ongoing Gaza war and genocide along with the prolonged Israeli occupation of Palestine's West Bank and the Gaza Strip has led to Israel's gradual international isolation due to worsening humanitarian crisis and famine in the Gaza Strip, causing several Western countries to recognize a Palestinian state.

== See also ==
- Apartheid in South Africa
- Economic sanctions
- International sanctions
- Northern Cyprus
- Pariah state
- Regional inequality
- Rhodesia
- Rogue state
- Sakoku
