= Billy McMillan (disambiguation) =

Billy McMillan (died 1991) was an Irish footballer.

Billy McMillan may also refer to:

- Billy MacMillan (1943–2023), Canadian hockey player and coach
- Billy McMillen (1927–1975), Irish republican activist and an officer of the Official Irish Republican Army
- Billy McMillon (born 1971), American baseball player

== See also ==
- Bill MacMillan (academic) (born 1950), British academic and former vice-chancellor
- William MacMillan (disambiguation)
