= Plastimetal =

Spanish electrical equipment manufacturer

Plastimetal was a Spanish company dedicated to the manufacture of electrical equipment.

It was founded in 1941 in Burgos, Spain by Mr. Julio Cano Pereda and Mr Jose Cano Pereda. The small company struggled during the immediate years after the Spanish Civil War. It then boomed under the reconstruction effort and construction boom that followed in the 1950s. By the late 1960s Plastimetal had become one of the most important companies in Burgos and employed more than 300 people. It relocated into a new expansion area in Burgos where the Polo de Desarrollo Industrial, an effort by the government of Franco to build a strong manufacturing base in poor areas of Castile and Aragon, was located in the new neighborhood of Gamonal. The company continued growing strongly after the departure of Mr. Jose Cano and under the control of Mr. Julio Cano it reached its peak as the biggest company in Spain supplying switches and plugs, with successful families such as "Arlanza", "Alpina", "Brio", "2000". Mr Cano's death in 1991 at the age of 83 marked the beginning of the end. Unable to solve its own financial issues with government institutions, the company filed for bankruptcy and disappeared in 1998.
