= Judith McMillan =

American artist

Judith McMillan (born 1945) is an American artist. Her work is included in the collections of the Whitney Museum of American Art and the Cleveland Museum of Art.
