= Bertie McMillan =

Scottish footballer

Personal information
- Full name: Hubert A. McMillan
- Place of birth: Scotland
- Position: Inside right

Senior career*
Years	Team	Apps	(Gls)
1916–1917	Queen's Park	41	(8)
- * Club domestic league appearances and goals

Hubert A. McMillan was a Scottish amateur footballer who played in the Scottish League for Queen's Park as an inside right.

== Personal life ==
Allan served as a lieutenant in the Royal Air Force during the First World War.

== Career statistics ==
Appearances and goals by club, season and competition
Club	Season	League			Other		Total	
Club	Season	Division	Apps	Goals	Apps	Goals	Apps	Goals
Queen's Park	1915–16	Scottish First Division	7	0	2 (Note: Appearances in Glasgow Merchants Charity Cup)	0	9	0
Queen's Park	1916–17	Scottish First Division	27	7	3 (Note: 2 appearances in Glasgow Merchants Charity Cup, 1 appearance in Glasgow Cup)	0	30	7
Queen's Park	1917–18	Scottish First Division	7	1	1 (Note: Appearance in Glasgow Cup)	0	8	1
Career total			41	8	6	0	47	8
