= Harry MacMillan =

Scottish footballer

Personal information
- Place of birth: Scotland
- Position: Inside forward

Senior career*
Years	Team	Apps	(Gls)
–1904	Brentford	0	(0)
1904–1905	Hamilton Academical	20	(6)
1905–1906	Clyde	14	(2)
1906–1908	East Stirlingshire	16	(2)
- * Club domestic league appearances and goals

Harry MacMillan was a Scottish professional footballer who played in the Scottish League for Hamilton Academical, East Stirlingshire and Clyde as an inside forward.

== Career statistics ==
Appearances and goals by club, season and competition
Club	Season	League			National Cup		Other		Total	
Club	Season	Division	Apps	Goals	Apps	Goals	Apps	Goals	Apps	Goals
Hamilton Academical	1904–05	Scottish Second Division	20	6	0	0	1 (Note: Appearance in Scottish Qualifying Cup)	0	21	6
Clyde	1905–06	Scottish Second Division	14	2	2	0	—		16	2
East Stirlingshire	1906–07	Scottish Second Division	9	1	0	0	—		9	1
East Stirlingshire	1907–08	Scottish Second Division	7	1	6	0	—		13	1
East Stirlingshire	Total		16	2	6	0	—		22	2
Career total			50	10	8	0	1	0	60	10
