= Norman MacMillan =

Norman MacMillan may refer to:

- Norman Macmillan (RAF officer), (1892–1976), British pilot
- Norman MacMillan (politician), Quebec provincial politician
- Norman John MacMillan (1909–1978), president of Canadian National Railway, 1967–1974
- Norm McMillan (1895–1969), baseball player
