= Alexander Macmillan (engineer) =

- Born: Frederick Alexander Macmillan; 1927 or 1928 (age 96–97)
- Citizenship: Canadian
- Education: Ph.D., University of Cambridge; MSc, University of Cambridge; B.S., Queen's University
- Notable work: Macmillan Correction

Frederick Alexander Macmillan (born 1927) is a Canadian engineer best known for the Macmillan Correction, the most widely used mathematical correction to account for errors in the calculation of velocity of an object moving along a gradient due to viscous effects and wall proximity.

Originally from Canada, Macmillan received a Bachelor of Science degree in engineering physics in 1950 from Queen's University. He later attended the University of Cambridge from 1952 to 1955, where he was a member of Gonville and Caius College, and earned a Master of Science degree. During his studies, he published several papers: in the Journal of the Royal Aeronautical Society, "Viscous effects on Pitot tubes at low speeds"; in the Aeronautical Journal, "Viscous effects on flattened Pitot tubes at low speeds"; and in the Journal of Scientific Instruments, "Liquid manometers with high sensitivity and small time-lag". Following completion of his degree, Macmillan took employment helping development of the AIM-7 Sparrow in California. By the early 1960s he had left the aeronautical industry and moved to Ontario where he began working in the pulp and paper sector. Upon his retirement he moved to British Columbia.

In 2004, while web surfing at his home, Macmillan learned for the first time that the papers he had published a half-century before had been cited hundreds of times in the decades past and elements of them were now being referred to as the "Macmillan Correction" in scientific publications. Upon learning this, Macmillan contacted Dame Ann Dowling, chair of fluid mechanics at the University of Cambridge. Dowling suggested Macmillan apply for a Doctor of Philosophy degree by Special Regulation, a special procedure by which a holder of a lower degree at the university can be awarded a doctorate by documenting a contribution to human knowledge in lieu of a dissertation. In consideration of Macmillan's then-advanced age, special dispensation was granted to conduct his viva voce via telephone. He was made Doctor of Philosophy by publication on July 20, 2009, at Senate House, Cambridge.
