= James McMillan (footballer, born c. 1866) =

Scottish footballer

James McMillan (c. 1866 – unknown) was a Scottish footballer who played for Sunderland in 1884.

== Sunderland career ==
McMillan made his debut for Sunderland in a 3–1 loss to Redcar Tow F.C. on 8 August 1884 in the FA Cup. He was Sunderland's first professional captain as the team turned professional in 1886. After playing football, McMillan was the chairman of masonry company 'J. McMillan & Sons'.
