= William Hutchison McMillan =

British mining engineer

William Hutchison McMillan OBE MIME FRSE (1886-9 June 1947) was a British mining engineer. He was Head of the Department of Mining and Fuels at University College, Nottingham then Professor of Mining in Edinburgh. In authorship he usually appears as W. H. McMillan.

== Life ==
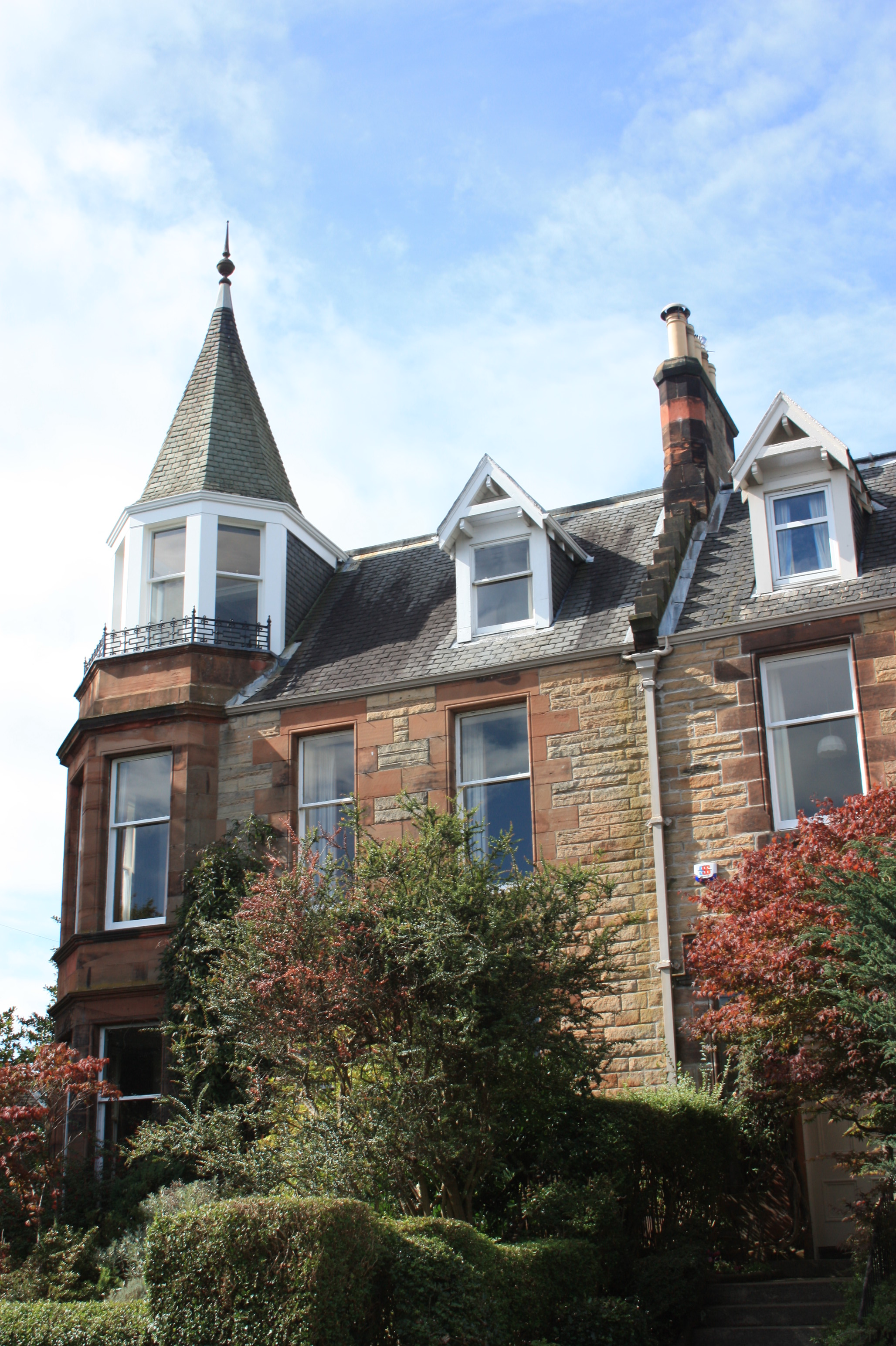
5 Gordon Terrace, Edinburgh

He was born in 1886 and attended Stirling High School. He studied mining engineering at the University of Glasgow graduating with a BSc in 1908. From 1908 to 1911 he was Assistant Professor of Mining at the University of Glasgow. He then moved to Nottingham to head the Department of Mining and Fuels. He lived at 29 Carisbrooke Drive in Nottingham.

In 1936 he came to Edinburgh living at 5 Gordon Terrace in the south of the city. He was Professor of Mining for both the University of Edinburgh and Heriot-Watt University. In 1938 he was elected a Fellow of the Royal Society of Edinburgh. His [proposers were Alexander Robert Horne, Sir Thomas Henry Holland, Sir Thomas Hudson Beare and James Cameron Smail .

In the Second World War he was Regional Mining Supplies Officer for Scotland, as part of the Ministry of Fuel.

He died on 9 June 1947 and on 12 June received the Order of the British Empire (OBE). The award was not intended to be posthumous.

== Publications ==
- Recent Developments in Mine Lighting (1938)
- Lighting in and about Mines
- Mine Illumination
