= George McMillan =

George McMillan may refer to:

- George McMillan (politician) (1943–2025), Lieutenant Governor of Alabama
- George McMillan (footballer) (1930–2019), Scottish footballer
- George McMillan (baseball) (1863–1920), Major League Baseball player
- George Bray McMillan (1916–1944), United States Army Air Forces fighter pilot

== See also ==
- George McMillin (1889–1983), United States Navy admiral
