= Mary Ellen O'Connell =

American legal academic

Mary Ellen O'Connell is an American professor who is the Robert and Marion Short Professor of Law at the University of Notre Dame Law School and a research professor of international dispute resolution at Notre Dame's Kroc Institute for International Peace in Studies. Since joining the law school in 2005, she has taught the courses International Law, International Law and the Use of Force, International Dispute Resolution, International Environmental Law, International Art Law, and Contracts. Prior to joining Notre Dame's faculty, she taught at Ohio State University (1999–2005), as the William B. Saxbe Designated Professor of Law in the Moritz College of Law and was a senior fellow of the Mershon Center for the Study of International Security and Public Policy. She was also a visiting professor at the University of Cincinnati College of Law (1998–1999).

== Additional experience ==
O'Connell has also been an associate professor (Title X, Professional Military Educator) for the US-German George C. Marshall European Center for Security Studies in Garmnisch-Partenkirchen, Germany (1995–1998), a visiting professor at the Bologna Center of Johns Hopkins University (1993–1998), a guest professor at LMU Munich in Germany (1993–1995), and an associate professor of law at the Indiana University School of Law in Bloomington, Indiana (1989–1995, on leave 1993–1995). Prior to beginning her career in academia, she practiced law as an associate with Covington & Burling in Washington, D.C. (1985–1988).

== Education ==
Her educational background includes a Ph.D. by publication and an LL.B. (1st class honours) from Cambridge University, a J.D. from the Columbia University School of Law, an M.Sc. in International Relations from the London School of Economics on a Marshall Scholarship, and a B.A. from Northwestern University.

She received a British Marshall Scholarship, a German Humboldt Foundation Fellowship, a Lauterpacht Research Centre for International Law (Cambridge)/MacArthur Foundation Fellowship, a U.S. Army Certificate of Achievement, funding from the Mershon Center (OSU) and the Kroc Institute (ND) for an international/interdisciplinary conference "What is War?"

== Publications ==
O'Connell's publications include 12 books and casebooks. Her latest solo-authored book is The Art of Law in the International Community (Cambridge University Press, 2019).

== Appointment ==
During the 2014–2015 academic year, O'Connell served as the Senior Templeton Foundation Legal Scholar at the Center of Theological Inquiry/Law and Public Affairs (Princeton). In 2018, she was appointed a Visiting Fulbright Fellow at the Norwegian Nobel Institute.

== Professional associations ==
O'Connell is a member of and former Vice President of the American Society of International Law, a fellow of the Center for Theological Inquiry (Princeton Theological Seminary), and a member of the International Institute for Humanitarian Law.
