= James McMillan (Scottish footballer) =

Scottish footballer

Personal information
- Full name: James McMillan
- Place of birth: Scotland
- Position: Defender

Senior career*
Years	Team	Apps	(Gls)
- Queen of the South Wanderers
1889–1890	Notts County	22	(0)
- * Club domestic league appearances and goals

James McMillan was a Scottish footballer who played in the Football League for Notts County.
