= Clan MacMillan =

Highland Scottish clan

- Clann Mac GhilleMhaolain
- Motto: Miseris succurrere disco (I learn to succour the unfortunate).

Profile
- Region: Highlands
- Plant badge: Holly

Chief
- George Gordon MacMillan of MacMillan and Knap
- Seat: Finlaystone House
- Historic seat: Castle Sween
Septs of Clan MacMillan
Adams, Baker, Baxter, Beall, Bell, Bleu, Blew, Blue, Brown, Broun, Callum, Calman, Can, Cane, Cannan, Channan, Coleman, Colman, Colmin, Connon, Gibbon, Gibson, Kane, Kean, Keane, Keen, Keene, Lany, Lennie, Leny, Linholm, MacBaxter, McBaxter, McMill, MacMillian, MacMill, MacMillen, MacMillin, McMillan, McMillen, McMillian, McMillin, McMull, MacMull, Mellan, Mill, Millan, Millen, Millin, Milliken, Millikin, Mull, Mullan, Mullen, M'Ghille-Domhnuich, M'Ghille-Duinn, M'Noccater, M'Nuccator, M'Ghille-Guirman, M’Vaxter, M'Bell, M'Ghille-ghuirm M'Veil, M’Callum, M'Hannanich, M’Calman, M'Igeyll, M'Igheil, Mellanson, Melançon, M'Can, M'Cannie, M'Ildonich, M'Channanich, M'Ilduin, Millanson, M'Colman, M'Colmin, M'Inville, M'Iveil, M'Iyell, M'Geil, M'Geyll, M'Kan, M'Kane, Milligan, Mulligan, M'Gibbon, M'Gibson, M'Kean, M'Keane, M'Keen, M'Kenn, M’Gill, M'Maoldonich, Walker.
Allied clans
Clan Cameron
Clan Donald

Clan MacMillan is a Highland Scottish clan. The Clan was originally located in the Lochaber area of the Scottish Highlands during the 12th century. The clan supported Robert the Bruce during the Wars of Scottish Independence, but later supported the Lord of the Isles in opposition to the Scottish Crown. During the Jacobite rising of 1745 the clan was divided with some supporting the Jacobites and others not taking part in the rebellion.

== History ==
=== Origins ===
The Chiefs of Clan MacMillan descended from an ancient Royal House as well as from the Orders of the Celtic Church. An Irish Prince, Saint Columba, in the 6th century, established his church on Iona. This became the cradle of Christianity in Gaelic Scotland. Priests were permitted to marry by the Columban Church although it faced increased pressure after the arrival of Queen Margaret of Scotland. Under Margaret, more European practices were introduced. Alexander I of Scotland tried to integrate the two traditions by appointing Cormac, who was a Columban, as Bishop of Dunkeld. One of Cormac's sons was Gillie Chriosd, which means Servant of Christ, who was the ancestor of the MacMillans.

Celtic priests had a distinctive tonsure: They shaved the front of their heads unlike the Romans, who shaved a ring around the crown. The Celtic tonsure was described as that of St. John, John being Iain in Scottish Gaelic. Mac Mhaoil Iain translates as "son of Bald-Iain", i.e. son of one who bore the tonsure of St John. However the Lochaber branch of Clan MacMillan preferred an alternative form: MacGillemhaoil which means son of the tonsured servant.

When David I of Scotland abolished the Mormaer of Moray, the Clan MacMillan appears to have settled on the shores of Loch Arkaig in Lochaber along with Norman Knights who also settled in the area.

Genetic analysis has associated branches of the clan with the R-FGC11674 haplogroup, a subclade of the broader R-S5520 (R-U106) lineage. While R-U106 is broadly associated with continental Germanic populations, R-S5520 has a more central European distribution and may have pre-Celtic origins, with its specific arrival and early origins within the British Isles remaining a subject of ongoing research.

=== Wars of Scottish Independence ===
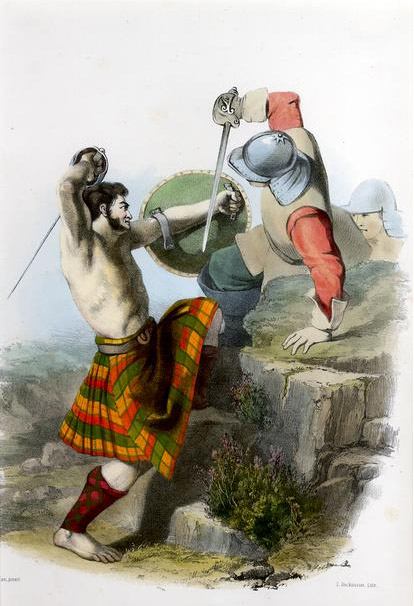
A romantic depiction of a clansman of Clan MacMillan illustrated by R. R. McIan, from James Logan's The Clans of the Scottish Highlands, 1845.

After Robert the Bruce killed John the Red Comyn in the Greyfriars Church of Dumfries he was forced to flee and hide in the Scottish Highlands. Bruce was sheltered by Maolmuire, chief of Clan MacMillan. The chief's brother, Gilbert, Baron of Ken stayed with the king and the Clan MacMillan fought at the Battle of Bannockburn. Gilbert is presumed to be the ancestor of the MacMillans of Brockloch, who were a large branch of the clan in Galloway.

=== Later 14th century ===
Robert the Bruce's son, David II of Scotland opposed the Lord of the Isles and the MacMillians who were considered loyal to the Lordship were expelled from the area of Loch Tay in about 1360. John of Islay, Lord of the Isles then granted them lands in Knapdale. Alexander 5th of Knap, 12th chief of Clan MacMillan has left two memorials: a round tower and a Celtic cross. One of the oldest fortresses in Scotland is Castle Sween and chief Alexander MacMillan married the heiress to the castle, Erca, daughter of Hector MacNeil. Alexander probably built the round tower on the castle which has always been known as MacMillan's Tower. The Celtic cross was erected in churchyard at Kilmory and it shows the chief himself hunting deer.

=== 18th century ===
By 1742, the direct line had become extinct and the Chiefship passed to MacMillan of Dunmore, whose lands were on the side of Loch Tarbert. The MacMillans were not noted Jacobites and during the Jacobite rising of 1745, John MacMillan of Murlaggan, whose line later headed the Lochaber MacMillans, refused to join Charles Edward Stuart unless the Stuarts renounced the Catholic Faith. However MacMillan's eldest son defied him and formed a company of Cameron of Lochiel's regiment which fought at the Battle of Culloden. Both sons were killed in the battle.

Donald MacMillan of Tulloch surrendered to Prince William, Duke of Cumberland, under the impression that he and his men would be protected. However, instead they were transported to the Caribbean without trial. Meanwhile, Hugh MacMillan guided Prince Charlie from Fasnakyle at the mouth of Glen Affric over the hills to Loch Arkaig after the Battle of Culloden.

Alexander MacMillan of Dumore, Depute Keeper of the Signet, an important legal post in Edinburgh, died in July 1770. He designated his heir as his cousin's son, Duncan MacMillan, a lawyer. This line were known as the Lagalgrave MacMillans and allegedly did not have full appreciation of their standing as clan chiefs, although they served their country well. Duncan's brother was William MacMillan who served as a captain of the Marines under Admiral Nelson on his flagship HMS Victory.

=== 19th century ===
The Clan Macmillan Society was founded in 1892, its first "Chief" being The Rev. Hugh Macmillan of Greenock Free Church.

=== 20th century ===
Captain William's great-grandson, General Sir Gordon MacMillan, was not even aware that he was the Clan Chief, until he sought to matriculate arms to fly over Edinburgh Castle. His arms incorrectly showed him as a cadet of the family until his true pedigree was discovered by The Rev. Somerled MacMillan. Sir Gordon MacMillan then established the seat of the chiefs at Finlaystone House in Renfrewshire.

== Clan castles and memorials ==
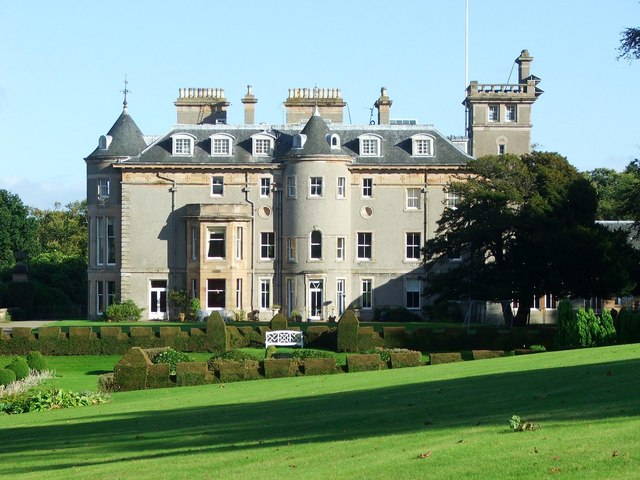
Finlaystone House, the current seat of the Chief of Clan MacMillan

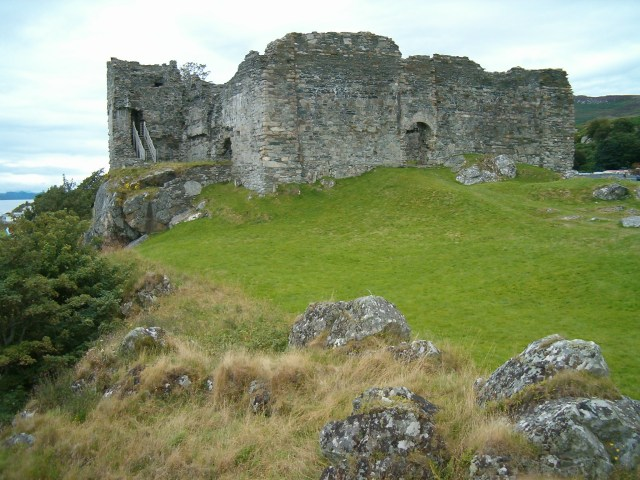
Castle Sween, historic seat of the Clan MacMillan

- Lawers, eight miles east of Killin, and standing under the mountain Ben Lawers, on the north side of Loch Tay, Perthshire, was probably the seat of the chief of Clan MacMillan who sheltered Robert the Bruce during the Wars of Scottish Independence. However Lawers had passed from the MacMillans by 1370 and was for a long time held by the Clan Campbell.
- Castle Sween, on the banks of Loch Sween is a ruined courtyard castle with ranges of buildings and towers. The castle was originally built by the Clan Sweeney but was held by the Clan MacMillan from 1362. The MacMillans were given the lands of Knap and the chiefs were then styled "of Knap". The castle has a tower named The MacMillan Tower that was named after them. To the south is the Kilmory Knap Chapel that houses the MacMillan Cross, an example of surviving Celtic art. The castle later passed to the Clan Campbell and is now in the care of Historic Scotland.
- Brockloch, three miles north-west of Carsphairn in Dumfries and Galloway was held by the MacMillans, but little survives of the tower house. It was the property of the MacMillans who are believed to have been descended from Gilbert MacMillan, Baron of Ken who was one of Robert the Bruce's companions.
- Finlaystone House, in Kilmacolm, Renfrewshire was owned by the Clan Cunningham for hundreds of years, but is now owned by the MacMillans. The visitor centre has Clan MacMillan exhibits.

== See also ==
- McMillan (surname)
- McMillan
- Scottish Clan
