= Thomas McMillan =

Thomas McMillan may refer to:

- Thomas McMillan (Ontario politician) (1864–1932), Canadian politician and farmer
- Thomas McMillan (Canadian politician) (born 1945), Canadian politician and political scientist
- Thomas McMillan (British politician) (1919–1980), British MP for Glasgow Central 1966–1980
- Thomas McMillan (footballer) (1866–1928), Scottish footballer
- Thomas McMillan (golfer) offered/won 1774 Silver Cup for competition at Musselburgh, East Lothian
- Thomas S. McMillan (1888–1939), American Representative in the U.S. House from South Carolina
- Tom McMillan (baseball) (born 1951), baseball player
- Tommy McMillan (baseball) (1888–1966), baseball player
- Tommy McMillan (footballer, born 1936) (1936–2023), Scottish footballer (Watford FC, Carlisle United FC)
- Tommy McMillan (footballer, born 1944) (1944–2026), Scottish footballer (Aberdeen FC)

== See also ==
- Thomas McMillen (disambiguation)
- Thomas C. MacMillan (born 1948), Canadian businessman
- Thomas C. MacMillan (politician) (1850–1935), American politician
