= Marshall Flowage =

Flowage in Nova Scotia, Canada

- Interactive map of Marshall Flowage
- Location: Halifax County
- Coordinates: 45°1′13″N 62°29′19″W
- Primary inflows: East River Sheet Harbour
- Basin countries: Canada

Marshall Flowage is a flowage in Halifax County, Nova Scotia, Canada. The flowage is near Toadfish Lakes Wilderness Area, and a rural community named Lochaber Mines. The flowage is 96.26 kilometres (59.81 mi) from Halifax, and 73.2 kilometres (45.5 mi) from Truro. It can be reached by Nova Scotia Route 374, which is nearby the flowage.

== Hydrology ==
Marshall Flowage measures approximately 6.45 kilometres (4.01 mi) in length and 0.8 kilometres (0.50 mi) in width. It is the inflow of East River Sheet Harbour. Near the lake, there is Mur Pond, Lake Mulgrave, Cross Lake, and Lewiston lake. It is below Malay Falls and above Froser Lake.

== See also ==
- Sheet Harbour, Nova Scotia
- Beaver Dam, Nova Scotia
- Malay Falls, Nova Scotia
