= East River Bridge (Sheet Harbour) =

Bridge in Nova Scotia, Canada

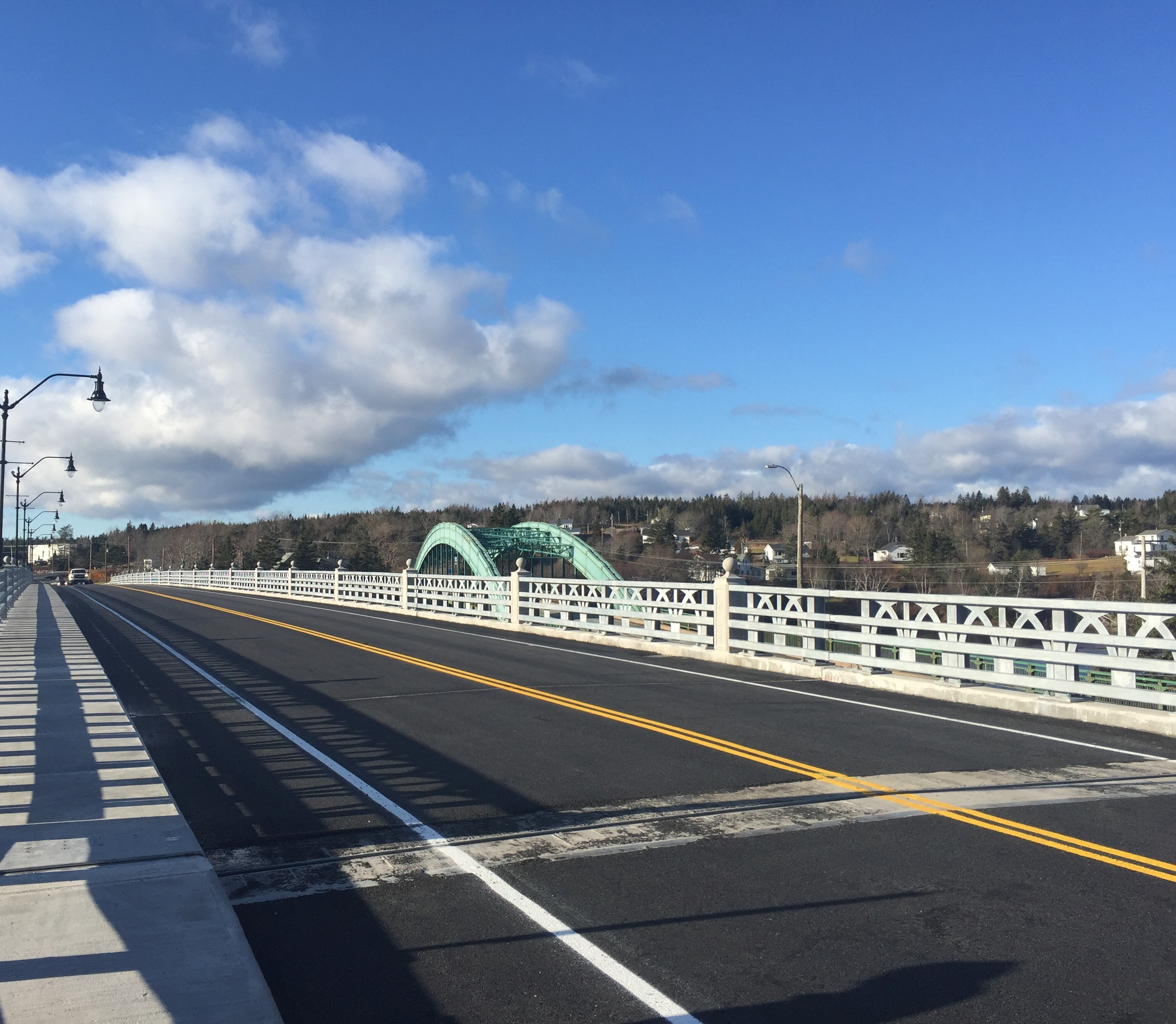
- The East River Bridge in 2015, a few days after opening. The old bridge is visible in the background, as the green arch.
- Coordinates: 44°55′09″N 62°30′55″W
- Carries: 2 lanes of Nova Scotia Trunk 7
- Crosses: Northeast Arm of Sheet Harbour
- Locale: Sheet Harbour, Nova Scotia; Watt Section, Nova Scotia
- Maintained by: Nova Scotia Department of Transportation

Characteristics
- Design: Multi-span
- Total length: 183 m (600 ft)

History
- Designer: Ryan Swinemar; Tim Jordan
- Construction start: September 2014
- Opened: 17 December 2015 (for pedestrians); 18 December 2015 (for vehicles)

Location
- Interactive map of East River Bridge

The East River Bridge is a multi-span bridge in Sheet Harbour, Nova Scotia that carries Trunk 7 and the Marine Drive scenic route over the Northeast Arm of Sheet Harbour. The bridge is 183 m (600 ft) in length and was constructed from September 2014 to December 2015. It was opened on December 17, 2015, to pedestrians, with a bridge walk commemorating the closing of the old bridge and the opening of the new bridge. The bridge was opened to vehicles the day after. It replaced a green steel arch bridge of the same name that was built in 1956 immediately north of the current bridge. The previous bridge had a span of 213 m (699 ft) and shared engineering ties with the Angus L. MacDonald Bridge in Halifax. Nova Scotia was considering repairs to the old bridge, but they ultimately elected to construct a new bridge instead. The current bridge was designed without overhead arches, unlike its predecessor, as the construction cost would have been doubled.

== History ==
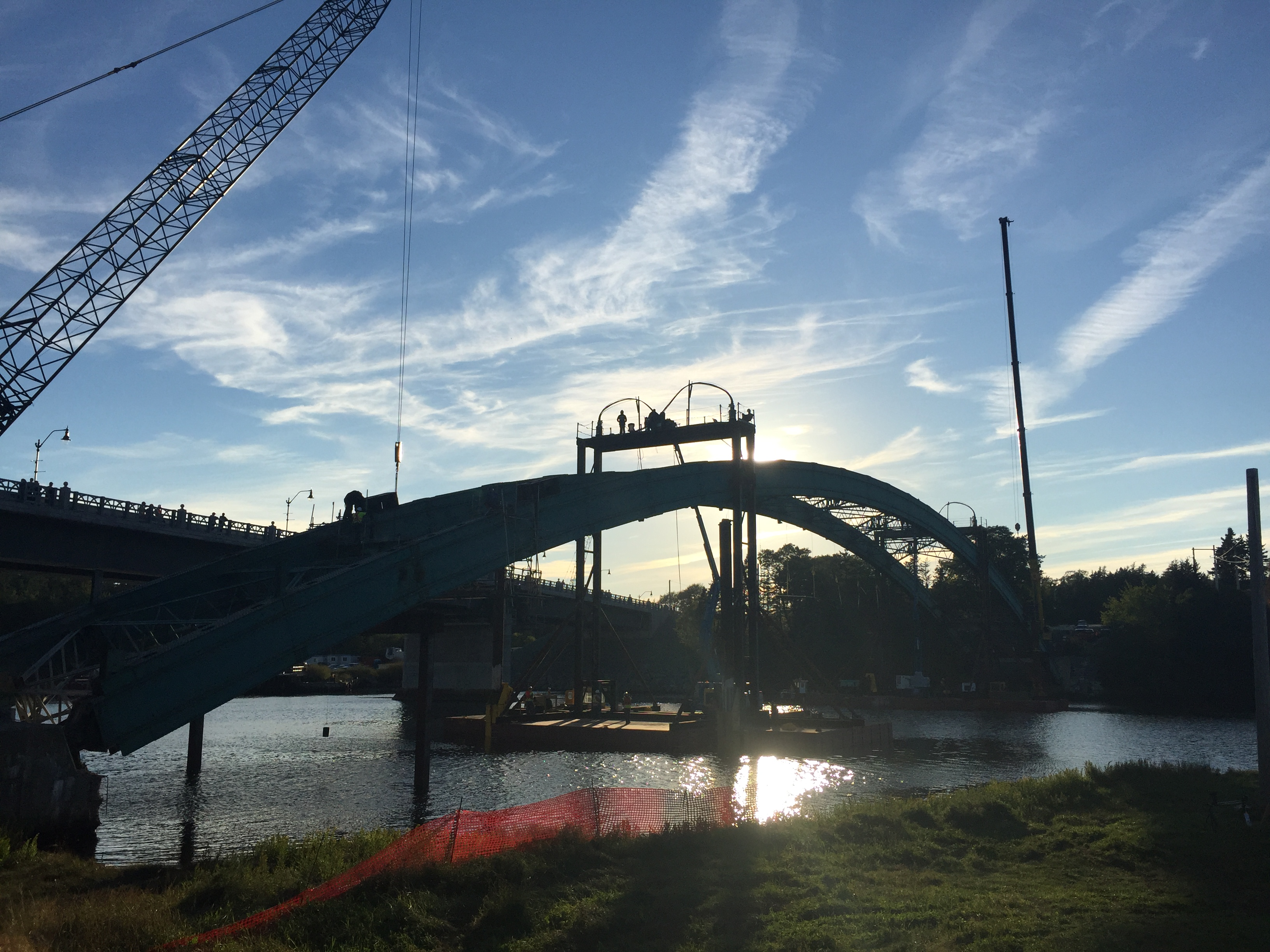
The old East River Bridge in August 2016, during its demolition.

The predecessor to the current bridge was located in Sheet Harbour, in the eastern area of the Halifax Regional Municipality, along the Eastern Shore. It was a green steel arch bridge, and was built in 1956 over the Northeast Arm of Sheet Harbour. It had a half-through, two-hinge type arch, as well as a built-up box-cross section for support. The bridge was 213 metres (699 ft) in length, with a main span of 140 metres (460 ft). The bridge had engineering ties with the Angus L. MacDonald Bridge in Halifax. The deck carried the two lanes of Trunk 7 and by extension the Marine Drive scenic route, and was hung from the arch by vertical steel wide flange shape hangers. The ribs of the bridge were heavily reinforced in 1988. As the bridge neared the end of its lifespan, it was replaced by a new bridge with the same name. Unlike the old bridge, the new bridge was designed without overhead steel arches that would have doubled the cost.

== Construction ==
Construction of the $19 million bridge began in September 2014. The Nova Scotia Government contributed $11.8 million to the project, with the remaining $7.2 million coming from the Government of Canada. The contractor, Dexter Construction, poured 2,260 cubic metres (2,960 yd^{3}) of concrete over 650 t (720 short tons) of rebar. The new bridge relies on two pillars set in the granite below the Northeast Arm. They were built with a technique which involved drilling steel pipes into the riverbed, then surrounding them with concrete and steel, instead of installing cofferdams, which would be more costly and would disrupt the river. Near completion, a deck, railings and sidewalks, were laid. It is built on the same site as the old bridge's predecessor, which was constructed in 1907. Unlike the old bridge, the new bridge was designed without overhead steel arches that would have doubled the cost. Overall, the structure is two metres (6.6 ft) wider than the old bridge. It includes a wider shoulder for cyclists. Several modifications were made to the roads on the Sheet Harbour side, near the bridge. Trunk 7 was aligned with what was previously Riverside Drive, which is now non-existent. Church Point Road and Pool Road were aligned to the new Trunk 7. The access road to and Duncan MacMillan High School was slightly modified. A minor loop called Sprott Lane was extended along a part of the old Trunk 7 for a few households. There is no toll to access the bridge.

The bridge opened on 17 December 2015, with a bridge walk, in which Sheet Harbour residents walked across the old bridge to commemorate its closure, then walked back across the new bridge signifying its opening. That same day, the new bridge was opened for pedestrians, and open to traffic the following day. The new bridge has a projected lifespan of at least 75 years, until 2090. It also has a sidewalk, which connects to Sheet Harbour's current sidewalk system. Officials hope this will encourage active transportation.

The old East River Bridge was closed immediately after the bridge walk and demolition was completed in early September 2016.
