= Grand Lake (Nova Scotia) =

Grand Lake can refer to at least 9 different lakes in the Canadian province of Nova Scotia:

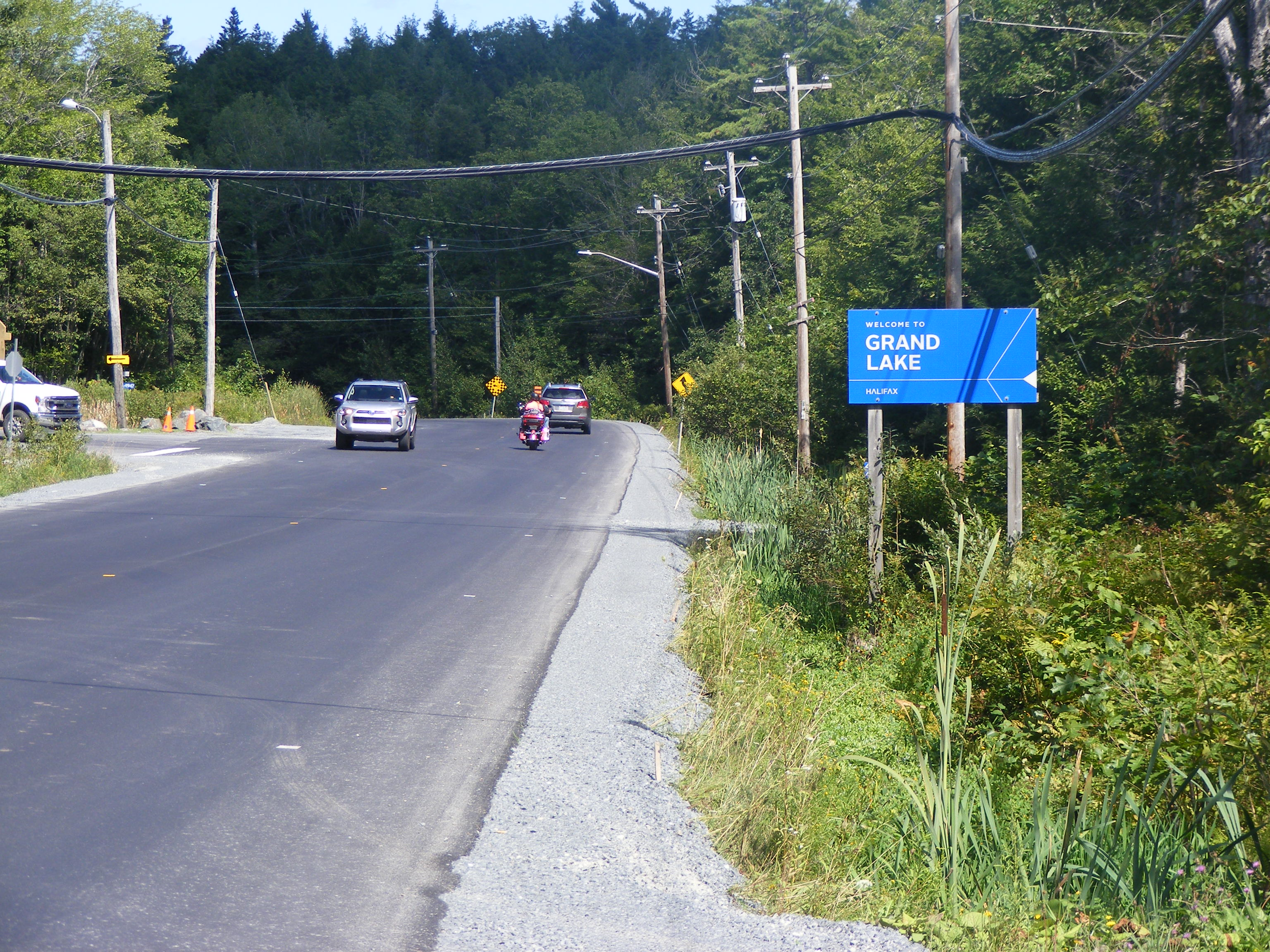
- Sign for the Shubenacadie Grand Lake.
  Grand Lake, Annapolis County (south of Annapolis Royal) at 44°38′36″N 65°28′15″W
- Grand Lake, Cape Breton County (northwest of Sydney) at 46°09′52″N 60°07′44″W
- Grand Lake, Cape Breton County (north of Louisbourg) at 45°57′40″N 59°57′14″W
- Grand Lake, Halifax Regional Municipality (north of Sambro) at 44°29′28″N 63°37′47″W
- Grand Lake, (west of Sheet Harbour) at 44°55′16″N 62°35′58″W
- Grand Lake, Halifax Regional Municipality (southeast of Meaghers Grant) at 44°53′42″N 63°09′08″W
- Grand Lake, Halifax Regional Municipality (west of Porters Lake) at 44°43′16″N 63°19′39″W
- Shubenacadie Grand Lake, Halifax County (west of Enfield) at 44°55′5.7″N 63°35′40″W
- Grand Lake, Richmond County (on Isle Madame) at 45°33′00″N 61°03′00″W
