= Duncan MacMillan =

Duncan MacMillan or Macmillan may refer to:

- Duncan Macmillan (playwright), British playwright and director.
- Duncan Macmillan (art historian), Scottish academic and writer
- Duncan Macmillan (athlete) (1890–1963), British track and field athlete competitor in the 1912 Summer Olympics
- Duncan MacMillan (businessman), co-founder of Bloomberg L.P.
- Duncan Macmillan (Canadian politician) (1837–1903), Canadian lawyer and member of parliament
- Duncan MacMillan (Nova Scotia politician) (1897–1969)
- Duncan MacMillan (Alberta politician) (1887–1962)

== See also ==
- Duncan McMillan (disambiguation)
- Duncan MacMillan High School, a secondary school in Sheet Harbour, Nova Scotia, Canada
- Duncan MacMillan Nursing Home in Sheet Harbour, Nova Scotia, Canada
