= Marine Drive Academy =

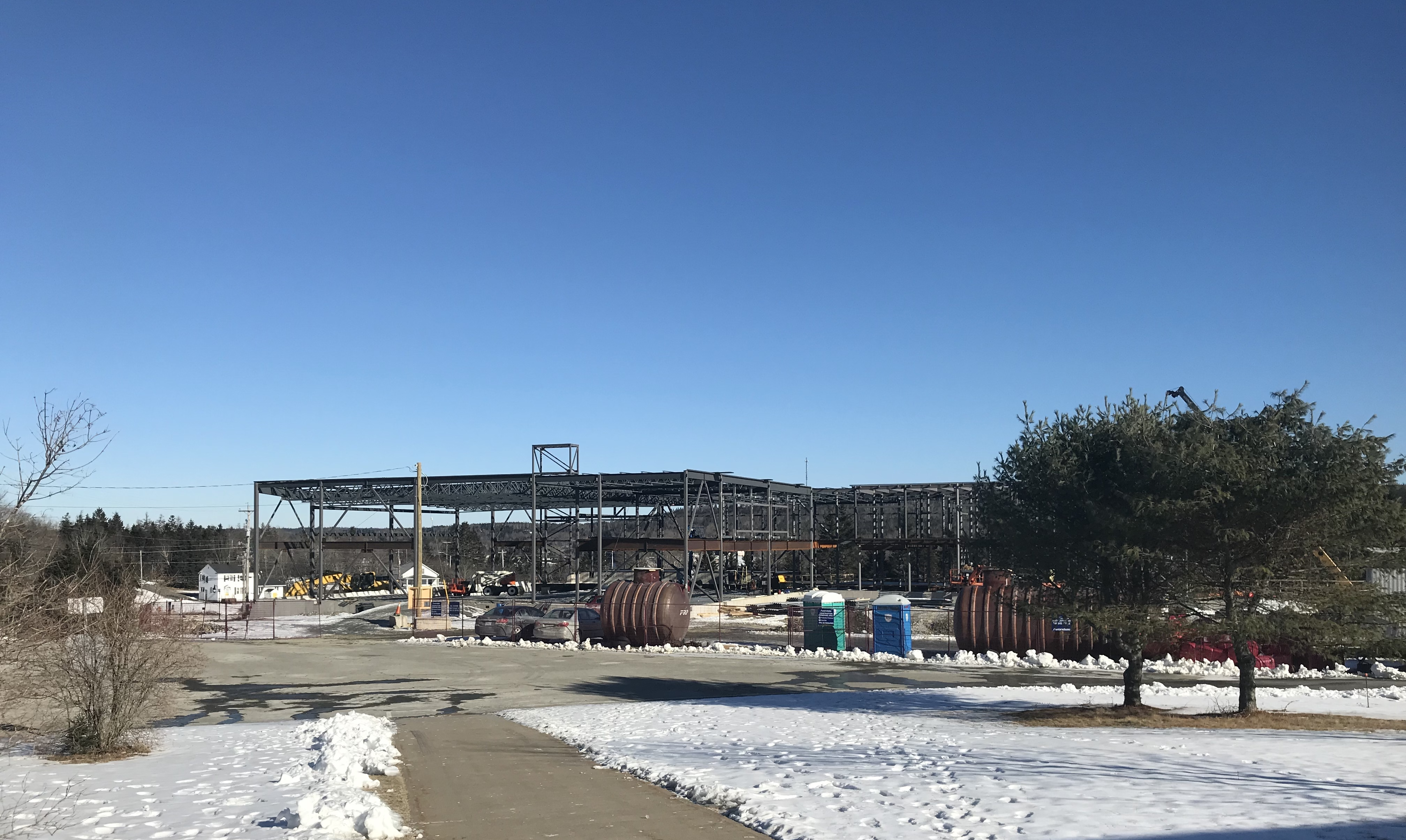
- MDA under construction in January 2019.

Location
- 429 Church Point Road; Sheet Harbour, Nova Scotia, B0J 3B0; Canada
- Coordinates: 44°55′6.81″N 62°31′9.66″W

Information
- School type: P-12
- Founded: September 2020; 5 years ago
- School board: Halifax Regional Centre for Education
- Grades: Pre-Primary–12
- Enrollment: 256 (2020)
- Website: mda.hrce.ca

Marine Drive Academy (MDA) is a P-12 school in Sheet Harbour, Nova Scotia, Canada.

The school is located in the Halifax Regional Municipality and is a part of the Halifax Regional Centre for Education. It is located adjacent to its predecessor, Duncan MacMillan High School, and on the site of the former Sheet Harbour Consolidated School. Construction began in late 2017 and the building opened in September 2020. Avondale Construction was enlisted as the contractor, while Century Exteriors and FBM Architecture handled the exterior and interior design respectively. The structure of the building was influenced heavily by the surrounding landscape, and is designed to also act as a community hub. As of 2020, 256 students were enrolled in the school.

== History ==
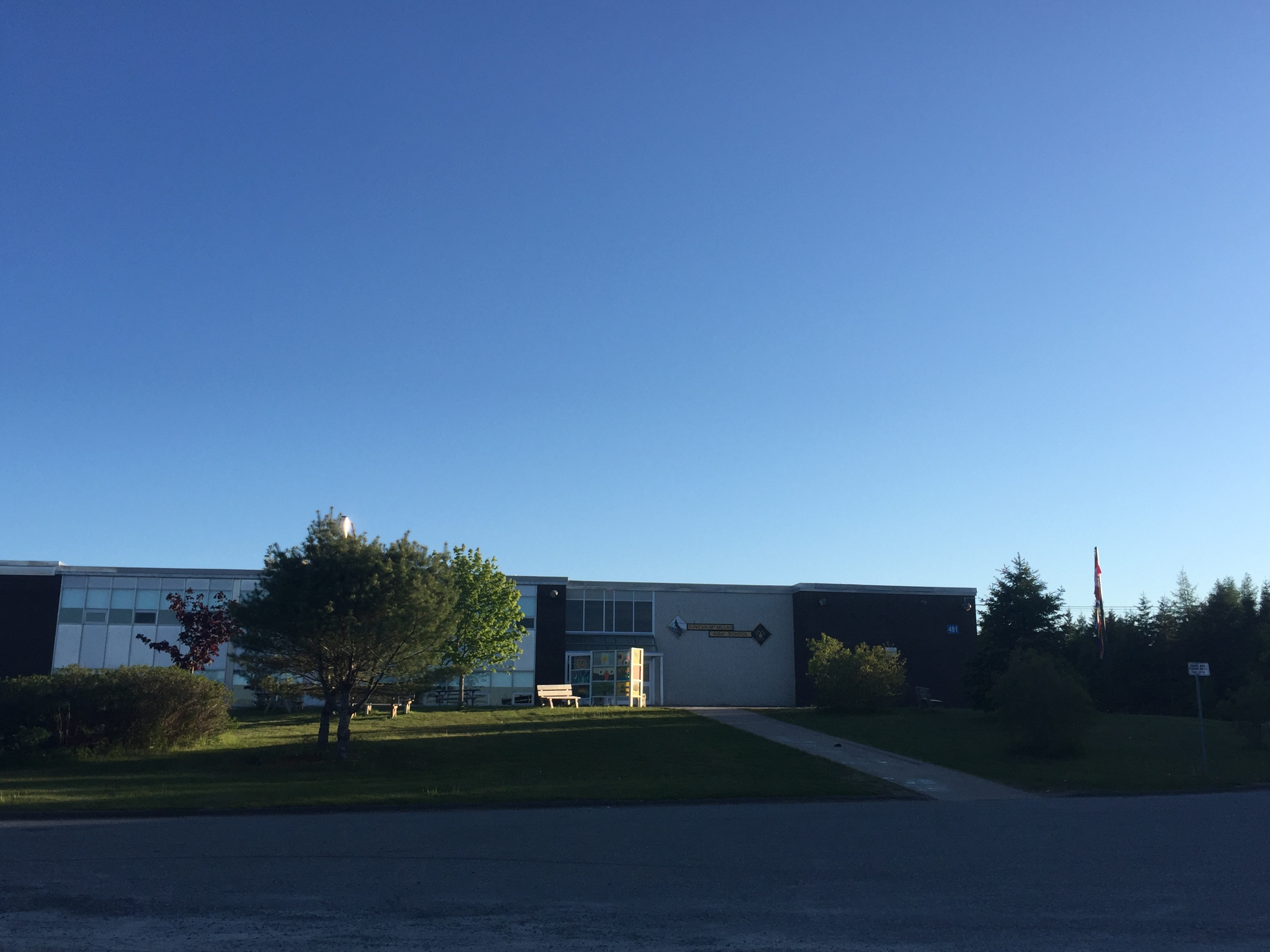
Duncan MacMillan High in 2017.

At a meeting of the former HRSB on March 28, 2012, representatives of the DMHS catchment area requested that the area's schools be put up for review. A school review committee was formed in accordance with standard procedures, which met several times from 2012 to 2013. Strong local support was expressed for a new facility. The schools were considered in need of replacement due in part to their age; they were built in the 1950s and 60s. The HRSB voted to prioritize the construction of a new P-12 school for the Sheet Harbour area. The committee felt that a rural facility had unique challenges and desired more recreational facilities. Boundary changes to the western edge of the Duncan MacMillan catchment area were proposed, but were highly unpopular among local residents. At the time, about a tenth of the students would no longer fall under the catchment area with this change, severely affecting enrollment. The current catchment area is 84 km (52 mi) wide, the largest in the HRCE.

On December 23, 2013, the HRSB publicly announced that a new P-12 school would be built to serve the Sheet Harbour area.

Three potential sites for the new facility were proposed. The first was, at the time, the present site of SHCS and DMHS. The second site was located outside of Sheet Harbour and the third was in the center of the community. The grounds of SHCS and DMHS was announced as the selected location on April 26, 2016. Sheet Harbour Consolidated School was closed in 2017 after 60 years of operation as a part of the plan. Potential names for the new facility were collected from the public in early 2019. 61 names were submitted. Consensus was reached on two of the top three potential names for the facility. Consensus was not reached on a third candidate however, and a vote was held among the local students from April 24 to 25, 2019. The name of the facility was announced on June 17, 2019. Lakefront Consolidated School in Tangier, a DMHS feeder school, closed at the end of the 2018-2019 school year. A closing ceremony was held at the school on June 22, 2019.

Marine Drive Academy opened in September 2020.
