= Lochaber Mines, Nova Scotia =

Rural community on Nova Scotia

Coordinates: 45°0′11.2″N 62°28′12.4″W

Lochaber Mines in Nova Scotia

Lochaber Mines is a rural community on the Eastern Shore of Nova Scotia, Canada, in the Halifax Regional Municipality. It is located along Route 374 about 14 km (8.7 mi) northeast of Sheet Harbour. The community is located along East River and is near the Marshall Flowage, a large lake at the head of East River. The community is named for Lochaber, located in Scotland. In 1812, Alexander Fraser received a grant of land in the area. Several gold leads were opened by J.H. Anderson in 1887 in the area, however, not much work was done outside of exploratory work.
