= Chocolate Lake (Moser River) =

Lake in Nova Scotia, Canada

- Location within Nova Scotia
- Location: Halifax Regional Municipality, Nova Scotia
- Coordinates: 44°58′55.3″N 62°19′30.7″W
- Basin countries: Canada

Chocolate Lake is a lake in the Moser River community of Halifax Regional Municipality, Nova Scotia, Canada.

== See also ==
- List of lakes in Nova Scotia
