= DMHS =

DMHS may refer to:

- Dalton L. McMichael High School, in Mayodan, North Carolina
- Danbury Museum and Historical Society, in Danbury, Connecticut
- Del Mar High School, in San Jose, California, U.S.
- Desert Mountain High School, in Scottsdale, Arizona, U.S.
- Downtown Magnets High School, in Los Angeles, California, U.S.
- Drayton Manor High School, Hanwell, Ealing, England
- Dubai Modern High School, in Dubai, U.A.E
- Duncan MacMillan High School, in Sheet Harbour, Nova Scotia, Canada
