= West River Sheet Harbour =

- West River at its discharge point in to the Northwest Arm of Sheet Harbour via the West River Falls

Location
- Country: Canada
- Province: Nova Scotia

Physical characteristics
- Source
  - location: northwest of Beaver Dam, Nova Scotia
- Mouth
  - location: Sheet Harbour
  - coordinates: 44°55′27″N 62°32′35″W
  - elevation: sea level
- Length: Main: 30 km (19 mi); Killag: 27 km (17 mi); Little: 16.5 km (10.3 mi)

West River Sheet Harbour (locally known as West River) is a river on the Eastern Shore of Nova Scotia, Canada, in the Halifax Regional Municipality. Its headwaters are near the Musquodoboit Valley and the river flows southeast and empties in to the Northwest Arm of Sheet Harbour, Nova Scotia. The river has three main tributaries: West River Main, Killag River and Little River. The river was suffering from acidification, so a lime doser was installed and has been in use since September 2005. It stabilized the river's pH at 5.5, a healthy level for aquatic life.

== Geography ==
The West River system, along with the East River watershed system, comprise a total area of 988 km^{2}. The West River system has three main tributaries: West River, Killag River and Little River.

West River is the main tributary of the West River system. It is approximately 30 kilometres (19 mi) long and its headwaters are northwest of Beaver Dam. The river is prone to flash-flooding. There are two lake-like pools on the river. The first and more southerly one is Sheet Harbour Lake, which has an area of 1.2 km^{2} and is located near the West River Falls in Sheet Harbour. The other lake is Little Lake, which is more inland in the system and has an area of 0.5 km^{2}. Killag River and Little River both discharge in to the Main West River. Killag River begins at West Lake and Little River flows from Lake Alma. West River then flows through Sheet Harbour Lake, then down the West River Falls and discharges in to the Northwest Arm of Sheet Harbour.

Killag River is a secondary tributary of the West River system. It is approximately 27 kilometres (17 mi) long. Its headwaters are at an altitude of 155 metres (509 ft). Most of the salmon in the river system breed on the Killag River. Killag River discharges in to West River. Little River is the other secondary tributary of the river system. Its headwaters are in Lake Alma, a shallow lake at an altitude of 93 metres (305 ft). Little River is approximately 16.5 kilometres (10.3 mi) long. Little River discharges in to West River.

== History ==
In 1922, a ground-wood pulp mill, owned by the American Pulp and Wrapping Paper Co. of Albany, began operation on the West River Falls. They had purchased it from Rhodes and Currie, the previous owners who were a lumber company. It produced its first ground-wood pulp on October 5, 1925. It remained in operation until it was destroyed by Hurricane Beth in August 1971.

West River has been dosed with a lime doser since September 2005. Sheet Harbour was the first community in North America to equip a lime doser on one of its rivers. It was the result of the worsening salmon population in Atlantic Canada rivers, which is being caused be acid rain and low pH levels. It was successful in stabilizing the pH of the river at 5.5, which is a healthy level for salmon and other water life.
