= Leslie R. Fairn =

Canadian architect (1875–1971)

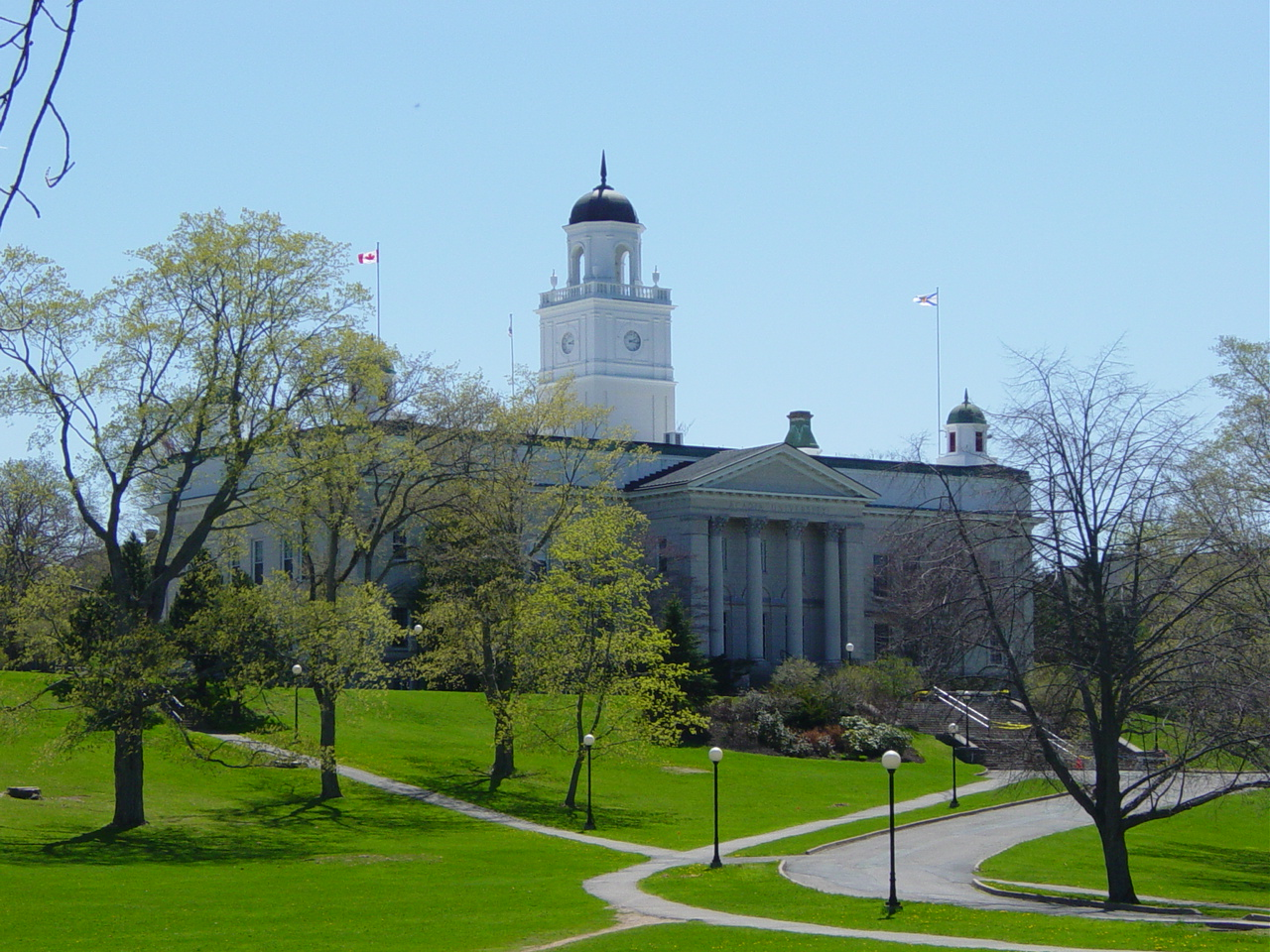
Administration Building, Acadia University

Leslie Raymond Fairn (June 25, 1875 – August 13, 1971) was a Canadian architect whose career is notable for its longevity and for the range of styles it encompassed, including Beaux Arts and Modernism. Most of his work was completed in the Maritimes.

== Biography ==
He was born in Waterville, Nova Scotia, the oldest of three children of W. H. and Laura (Lyons) Fairn. His father was a schoolteacher. He was married twice, first to Bessie Maude (Tupper) Fairn (1880–1918 ) who died of Spanish Influenza and second to Ethel Elizabeth (Hutchinson) Fairn (1900–1982). He had two daughters from his first marriage and five children from his second.

He attended Acadia University and later studied architecture in Boston, later apprenticing with Edward Elliot in Halifax. Beginning about 1901, he earned a living as Principal of Drawing and Manual Training at Horton College (Acadia University) in Wolfville. One of his first commissions was the Kings County Courthouse, completed in nearby Kentville in 1903, and in 1904 he moved to Aylesford where he began to practice full-time. He became a charter member of the Royal Architectural Institute of Canada (RAIC) in 1907 and was made a Fellow in 1939. He was also a founder of the Nova Scotia Association of Architects (NSAA).

In 1932 he moved to Wolfville where he continued to practice until his death at the age of 96. Meanwhile, around 1946 he opened an office in Halifax which was managed by his son Laird L. Fairn. This company handled large projects and was known as Leslie R. Fairn & Associates.

His career lasted 65 years, earning him the unofficial title of dean of Nova Scotia architects. His style ranged from Beaux Arts to Richardsonian Romanesque to Classical Revival and Modernism.

His brother, Clifford William Fairn, also practiced architecture, partnering with Charles Hay and designing several schools in Calgary between 1911 and 1914.

== Notable projects ==
=== Nova Scotia ===
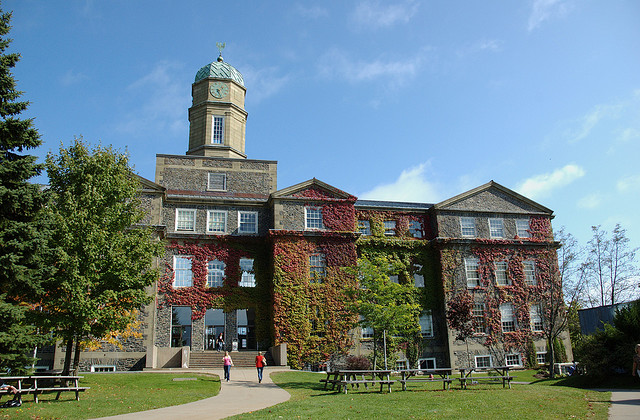
Henry Hicks Academic Administration Building at Dalhousie University.

- Kings County Courthouse, now Kings County Museum (1903)
- Digby County Court House (1910)
- West Highlands School, Amherst (1911)
- Annapolis Royal Town Hall Memorial Building (Classic Revival, 1922)
- Administration Building, Acadia University, Wolfville (1924)
- Dominion Public Building, Amherst (Beaux Arts, 1936)
- Eastern Shore Memorial Hospital, Sheet Harbour (1949)
- Halifax Memorial Library (1951)
- Henry Hicks Academic Administration Building, Dalhousie University, Halifax (1951, with E. W. Haldenby)
- Killam Memorial Library, Dalhousie University, Halifax (1971)

=== New Brunswick ===
- Northumberland County Courthouse (Richardsonian Romanesque, 1913)
- Highfield Street United Baptist Church, Moncton, New Brunswick (English Gothic and Greek, 1923)

=== Prince Edward Island ===
- Robertson Library, University of Prince Edward Island, Charlottetown (1973, completed posthumously)
