= Moser River, Nova Scotia =

Community in Nova Scotia, Canada

Moser River
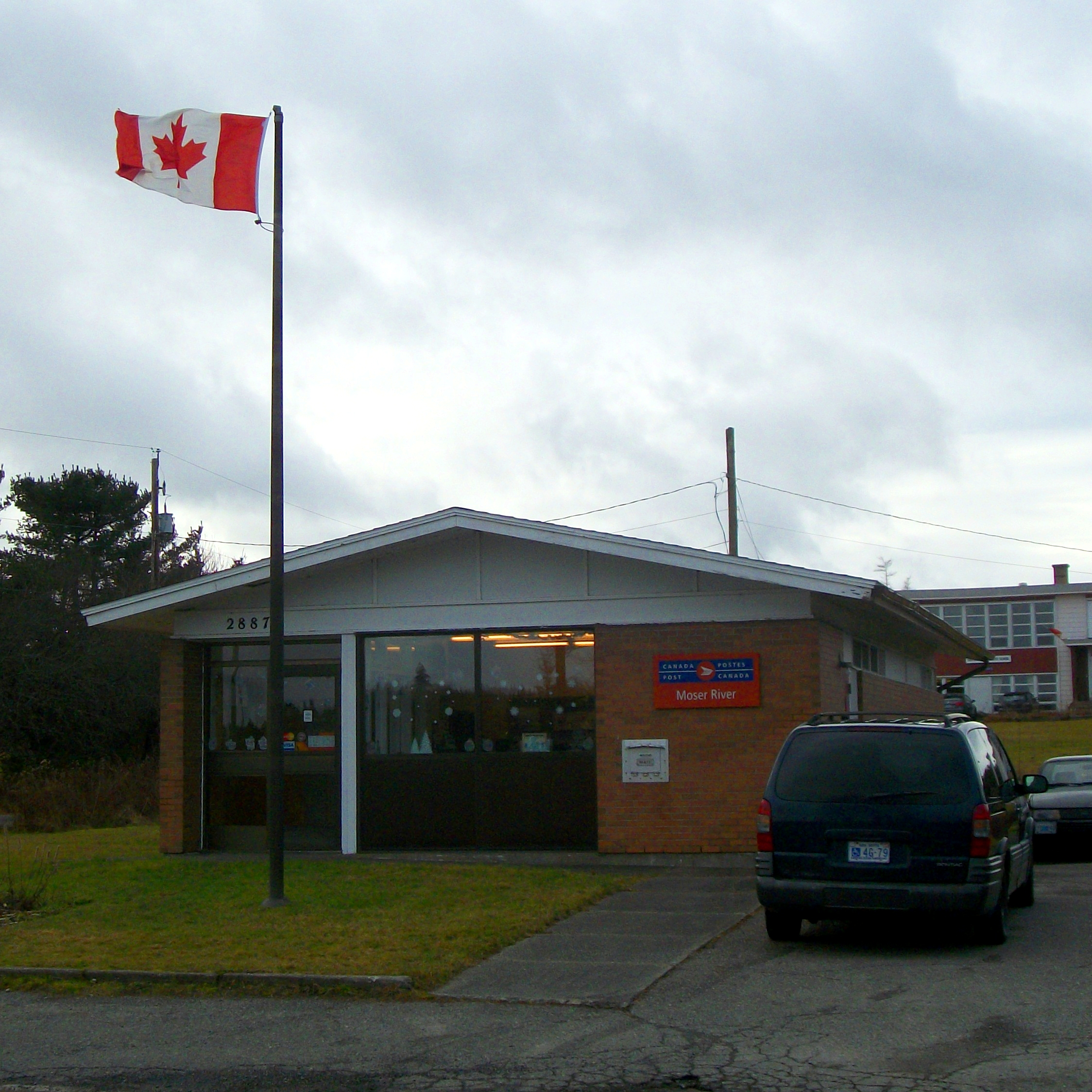
- Moser River Post Office in 2013.

- Location within Nova Scotia
- Coordinates: 44°58′03″N 62°15′39″W
- Country: Canada
- Province: Nova Scotia
- Municipality: Halifax Regional Municipality
- District: 2
- Founded: 1796

Government
  - Governing Council: Halifax Regional Council
- Time zone: UTC-4 (AST)
  - Summer (DST): UTC-3 (ADT)
- Canadian Postal code: B0J 2K0
- Telephone Exchanges: 902 347
- GNBC Code: CBAIO
- Highways: Trunk 7
- Part of a series about Places in Nova Scotia

Moser River is a rural community on the Eastern Shore of Nova Scotia, Canada, in the Halifax Regional Municipality. The community lies along the Marine Drive on Trunk 7, 32 km (20 mi) east of Sheet Harbour and 51 km (32 mi) southwest of Sherbrooke. The community is located along the shores of Necum Teuch Harbour, an inlet of the Atlantic Ocean, and is at the mouth of Moser River. The area was called Noogoomkeak in the mi'kmaq language, translating to "soft sand place". The community is named for Henry Moser, who was the son of Jacob Moser, who settled the area in the early 1800s. The first school in the community was built in 1905, and another school, Moser River Consolidated School, was built in 1957. The school closed in 2015, due to its very low student population. Marine Drive Academy in Sheet Harbour serves the community and its surroundings at all grade levels. There is a small seaside park in the community near the former school, as well as a post office and convenience store.

== Geography ==
Moser River is a small rural community located along the Eastern Shore of Nova Scotia, Canada, in the eastern area of the Halifax Regional Municipality. The community is located on the shores of Necum Teuch Harbour, an inlet of the Atlantic Ocean. The harbour extends southeast-ward from the community, extending into Necum Teuch Bay, and in turn the Atlantic Ocean. The community is located noticeably more inland compared to other communities in its vicinity, due to the shape of the harbour. There are several small islands in the harbour, concentrated primarily into two groups. One group of three are near the opening of the harbour into Necum Teuch Bay, and another cluster are more northward.

The community is also located at the mouth of Moser River. It flows into the harbour and its headwaters are at Moser Lake, which straddles the border between the Halifax Regional Municipality and Guysborough County. The lake is at an elevation of about 130 m (430 ft) and is located about 26 km (16 mi) northwest-ward of the community. On its course southeast-ward from Moser Lake, the river flows through several ponds and lakes. The river also traverses the western reaches of the Boggy Lake Wilderness Area.

== History ==
Moser River was established in 1783 as a way station and a lumber town. The bulk of Moser River's economy was built on fishing, forestry and tourism. Moser River is named for the Moser family who settled here, more specifically, Henry Moser originally of Lunenburg. Henry Moser immigrated to Canada from Germany in 1751 and settled at the present-day location of Moser River with his wife Johanna by 1809. Moser received land grants in the area around 1810. A Baptist church was built in the late 1880s, and a Presbyterian church was opened in Moser River on January 4, 1874. The first school in the community was established in the community in May 1905, and Moser River Consolidated School (later referred to as Eastern Consolidated School) was opened in 1957. Eastern Consolidated School was closed in 2015 due to low enrolment. The community now falls under the catchment area of Duncan MacMillan High School, in Sheet Harbour.
