= List of storms named Beth =

The name Beth has been used for three tropical cyclones worldwide, one each in the Atlantic Ocean, the Australian region of the South Pacific Ocean, and the Western Pacific Ocean.

In the Atlantic:

- Hurricane Beth (1971) – a Category 1 hurricane that formed of the southeast coast of the U.S. and struck Nova Scotia, Canada.

In the Western Pacific:

- Tropical Storm Beth (1996) (T9622, 32W, Seniang) – a severe tropical storm that struck the Philippines and Vietnam.

In the Australian region:

- Cyclone Beth (1976) – a Category 3 severe tropical cyclone that struck Queensland, Australia.
