= MacPhee House =

Coordinates: 44.92735°N 62.54399°W

MacPhee House Sheet Harbour

The MacPhee House in Sheet Harbour, Nova Scotia is a former hotel and present day visitor information centre listed on the Canadian Register of Historic Places for its heritage value. Wendy MacKenzie (the president of the Sheet Harbour Heritage Society) is the current curator.

The 1 1/2-story house was built around 1875 in the centre of Sheet Harbour on a 0.5 acres (0.20 hectares) lot. A two-story side ell was added in 1911 to accommodate visitors, as it was then being used as a hotel. This use continued until at least 1964. The gable wall features an open pediment in the style of Greek Revival architecture. Photographs of the hotel show an open verandah with decorative fretwork. A fire partially destroyed the extension and rather than see this historic building demolished, it was purchased by the Government of Nova Scotia in 1985 and moved to its present site near the West River Bridge on lands formerly owned by the Scott Paper Company.

Currently, the building is used as a Visitor Information Centre and also houses an interpretive centre for the history of the area. It is set in a park area linked to scenic nature trails.
