= Sheet Harbour 36 =

- Indian Reserve
- Location within Nova Scotia
- Coordinates: 44°55′N 62°32′W
- Country: Canada
- Province: Nova Scotia
- Municipality: Halifax Regional Municipality

Area
  - Total: 0.48 km^{2} (0.19 sq mi)

Population (2011)
  - Total: 15
  - Density: 31.1/km^{2} (81/sq mi)
- Time zone: UTC-4 (AST)
  - Summer (DST): UTC-3 (ADT)
- Canadian Postal code: B0J 3B0
- Telephone Exchange: 902 885
- Part of a series about Places in Nova Scotia

Sheet Harbour 36 is a Mi'kmaq reserve located in on the Eastern Shore of Nova Scotia, Canada, in the Halifax Regional Municipality. Part of the reserve is located just west of Sheet Harbour, Nova Scotia. The reserve's borders also includes a tract of land directly across the harbour, in the downtown area of Sheet Harbour. Grand Lake borders Sheet Harbour 36 on its western side. It is administratively part of the Millbrook First Nation.
