= Killam Library =

Library in Nova Scotia, Canada

Coordinates: 44°38′15″N 63°35′28″W

The Killam Memorial Library is the main library of Dalhousie University, and the largest academic library in the Maritimes, comprising 230,000 square feet (21,000 m^{2}) of space.

== History ==
Designed by Leslie R. Fairn, the library was made possible by the donation of $30 million by Dorothy J. Killam in memory of her late husband Izaak Walton Killam. The Killam Library replaced the former Macdonald Memorial Library, which had become too small for the student population. Construction began in 1966 and was completed in 1971. The open courtyard was covered by a glass ceiling in 1996, creating a year-round meeting area with food and a Second Cup coffee shop.

In 2010, a new master plan for the Dalhousie Campus proposed an expansion to the library by adding to the south and east sides of the structure and altering the look of the building by cladding the facade with a glass curtain wall.

There is another library of the same name in Yarmouth, Nova Scotia.
