= Duncan McMillan =

Duncan McMillan may refer to:

- Duncan McMillan (linguist) (1914–1993), British linguist and philologist
- Duncan McMillan (footballer) (1922–1992), Scottish professional footballer

== See also ==
- Duncan MacMillan (disambiguation)
