= Watt Section, Nova Scotia =

Coordinates: 44°54′21.9″N 62°28′55″W

Watt Section in Nova Scotia

Watt Section is a rural community on the Eastern Shore of Nova Scotia, Canada, in the Halifax Regional Municipality. The community is located along Nova Scotia Trunk 7 on the Marine Drive, and is located about 5 km (3.1 mi) southeast of Sheet Harbour, Nova Scotia. The community is located along the eastern side of Sheet Harbour, an inlet of the Atlantic Ocean. The community is named for William Watt, who purchased the land at the present day location of the community in 1844. The cookhouse used at the lumber mill at the head of East River in Sheet Harbour was bought by the residents of Watt Section after the closing of the mill in January 1891, and it was floated down to the community.
