= Kings County Museum =

Coordinates: 45°04′40.0″N 64°29′39.0″W

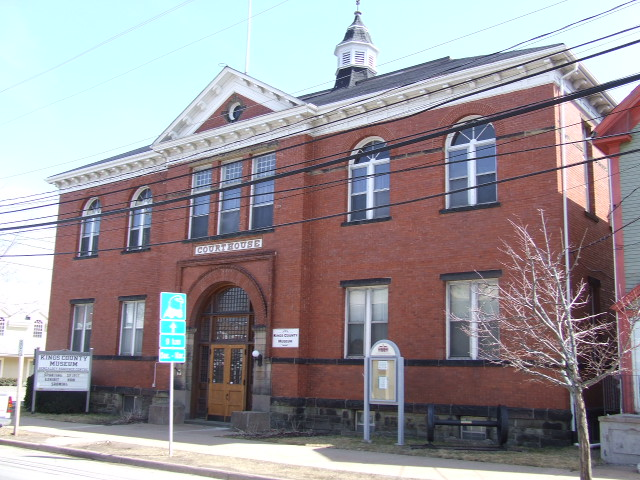
- Established: 1981
- Location: 37 Cornwallis Street, Kentville, Nova Scotia
- Type: Municipal Museum
- Website: www.kingscountymuseum.ca/

The Kings County Museum is a museum in Kentville, Nova Scotia, Canada, exploring the history of Kings County, Nova Scotia. It is housed in the restored 1903 Kings County Courthouse. The museum hosts a variety of permanent and changing displays about Kings County. It is also home to the Parks Canada National Commemorative New England Planters Exhibit.

== Courthouse building ==
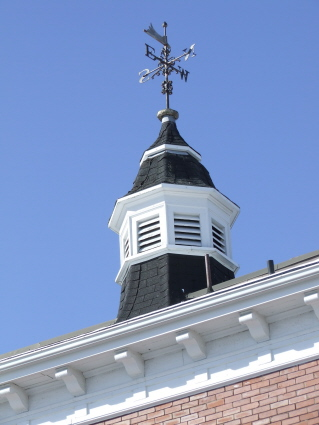
The courthouse cupola

The courthouse was built in 1903, replacing a wooden courthouse from 1850 located just to the north which was so decrepit it was subsequently used as a shed to store apples. The new courthouse was built by Wolfville builder and architect Leslie R. Fairn. It combined courts, county municipal offices and land registry as well as providing offices for probate, prothonotary, treasurer, county clerk and sheriff. Fireproof safety vaults were built into the walls and were said to be "the best in the province". The courthouse was built at a cost of $20,000 from brick and decorative pressed brick made in Avonport, Kings County, and sandstone quarried at nearby Cumberland County. The courthouse opened officially with the first meeting of Kings County Council in the new building on January 12, 1904. The first major trial at the courthouse was in June 1904 when it hosted the trial of William Robinson for the axe murder of his wife. Found guilty in a dramatic trial, during which lightning struck the courthouse's brand-new ornate cupola, Robinson was hanged on September 12, 1904, in front of a rowdy crowd at the jail beside the courthouse, the last hanging in Kings County. Trials were held in the building until 1980, when a new 2.5 million dollar municipal complex containing courts, county offices and a jail was constructed in Kentville.

== Museum ==
The Kings Historical Society was founded in 1978. The Kings Historical Society is a non-profit organization which owns and operates the Kings County Museum. When the courthouse closed in 1980, the society successfully campaigned to save it from demolition and restore it to serve as a county museum. raising $64,000 for restoration and $15,000 for neglected repairs. It officially opened to the public as the "Old Kings Courthouse Museum" on May 27, 1981, timed to coincide with the Apple Blossom Festival, marked by the museum's first exhibit, a history of the festival and the success of Kentville's Dominion Atlantic Railway in attracting tourism.

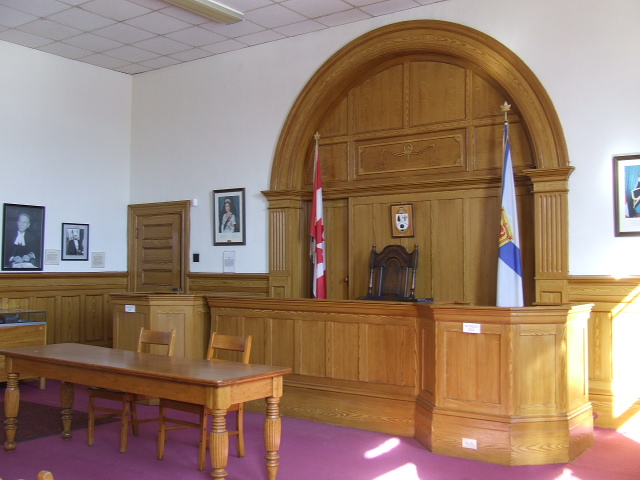
The restored 1903 courtroom

A highlight of the new museum was the restoration of the court room's extensive use of the lost art of painted wood grain. Little of the original finish remained but a local resident named Brad Forsyth, who had learned the technique from his father, repainted and restored the room's panelling, complete with secret figures of birds and animals hidden in grain patterns.

The society at first leased the courthouse from the county but purchased the building in 1993. The museum changed its name to the "Kings County Museum" in 2002. Working out of the former registry vaults of the courthouse basement, a Family History Committee built a large research centre for genealogists and successfully recorded and indexed every grave in Kings County. Parks Canada selected the museum to permanently host its National New England Planters Commemorative Exhibit in 1989. The museum has hosted a large number changing exhibits for a municipal museum, an average of six a year. The museum celebrated the 100th anniversary of the building and the 25th anniversary of the Historical Society in 2004 by inviting the current Kings County Council to re-enact the first meeting held in the building on January 12, 1904. However the Kings County Museum has faced challenges in recent years such as declining government support and a drop in tourism visitation in rural Nova Scotia. These challenges resulted in the formerly year-round museum closing during the winter months beginning in 2006. However the Kings Historical Society has continued to offer a year-round series of historical programs and special events to finance the operation of the museum.

=== Artifacts ===
- Sword of Captain William Bishop who fought in the Battle off Cape Split during the American Revolution
- the handcrafted desk of Kentville's first mayor John Warren King.

== See also ==
- List of museums in Nova Scotia
