= Sheet Harbour Consolidated School =

Coordinates: 44°55′7.3″N 62°31′2″W

- SHCS in 2008

Location
- 479 Church Point Road; Sheet Harbour, Nova Scotia, B0J 3B0; Canada

Information
- School type: Primary school
- Motto: Learning Lights The Way
- Established: 1957; 69 years ago
- Closed: 2017; 9 years ago
- School board: Halifax Regional School Board
- Enrollment: 95 (February 2016)
- Language: English, French
- Area: 1,965 m^{2} (21,150 sq ft)

Sheet Harbour Consolidated School was a school located in Sheet Harbour, Nova Scotia, Canada, which welcomed students from grades primary through six. The school was a peanut/nut safe school. In April 2008, Sheet Harbour achieved the Green School Award for the completion of 100 environmental projects. Each year the school had a Holiday/Christmas Concert and a Spring Concert. The children, with the help of the teachers, perform for the parents. Each class has a different performance usually following a theme.

== History ==
SHCS Playground

This school was built in 1957. This school once hosted the high school students before Duncan MacMillan High School was built. Sheet Harbour Consolidated School also hosted some DMHS students when DMHS had to be closed and torn apart looking for the cause of an unexplained illness that some of the students had in 1997. The school was closed in 2017, as a part of the plan to build one new school in the Sheet Harbour area.

== See also ==
- List of schools in Nova Scotia
