= Grand Lake (Sheet Harbour) =

- Location within Nova Scotia
- Location: Sheet Harbour, Nova Scotia
- Coordinates: 44°54′3.9″N 62°34′3.8″W
- Type: Lake
- Primary inflows: Grand Lake Flowage
- Primary outflows: Little West River
- Basin countries: Canada
- Surface elevation: 27 metres (89 ft)
- Islands: 6
- Settlements: Sheet Harbour, Nova Scotia; Sheet Harbour 36, Nova Scotia

Grand Lake is a lake just west of Sheet Harbour, Nova Scotia. Its primary outflow is Little West River, which flows into the Northwest Arm of Sheet Harbour. The land area of the Sheet Harbour 36 Indian reserve extends to a part of the shore of Grand Lake. In 2012, the Nova Scotia Government bought 470 hectares (1,200 acres) of land near the lake worth $1.1 million.
