= Duncan MacMillan Nursing Home =

Nursing home in Nova Scotia, Canada

Coordinates: 44.92032°N 62.53251°W

DMNH sign.

The Duncan MacMillan Nursing Home (DMNH) was a 25-bed nursing home in Sheet Harbour, Nova Scotia, Canada. It was built in 1948 as the Eastern Shore Memorial Hospital, and was repurposed into a nursing home after a new wing, which would become the Eastern Shore Memorial Hospital, was built in 1983. It was replaced by Harbourview Lodge in 2010, and was demolished.

== History ==
DMNH was named after a local well-known doctor, Dr. Duncan MacMillan. The building that was used as DMNH from 1983–2010 was originally built in 1948, and used as Eastern Shore Memorial Hospital. It was converted into a Nursing Home in 1983 after a new wing was built and made into the Eastern Shore Memorial Hospital.

The old door to the Eastern Shore Memorial Hospital, was used as a window for Duncan MacMillan Nursing Home.

In December 2005, negotiations between DMNH and the union representing DMNH staff broke down, leading to the threat of a strike over the Christmas holiday. A negotiated agreement was reached in early January 2006.

The Nova Scotia Department of Health announced plans in 2007 to build a replacement nursing home for Sheet Harbour in 2010.
