= Duncan MacMillan High School =

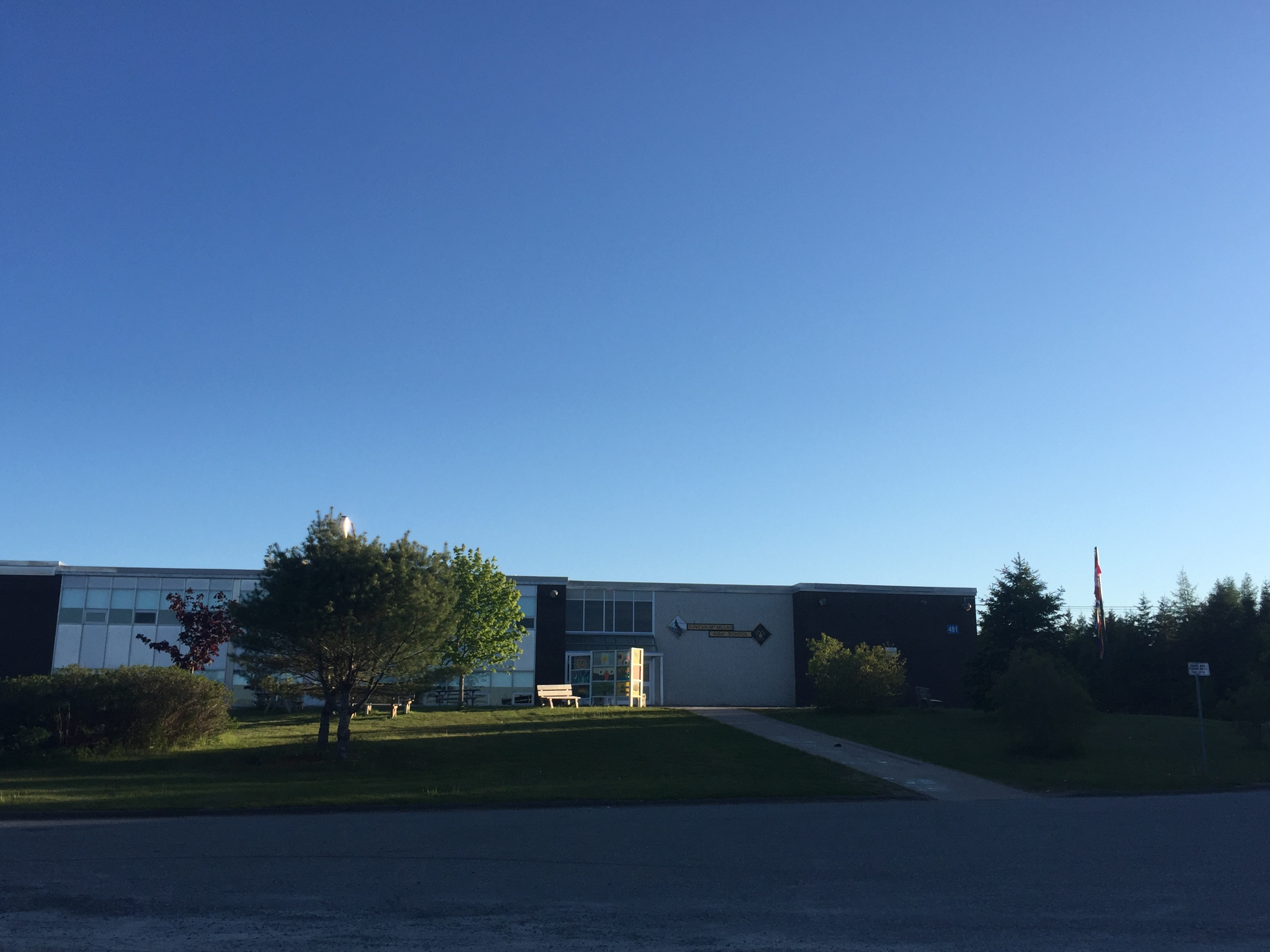
- DMHS in June 2017

Location
- 481 Church Point Road; Sheet Harbour, Nova Scotia, B0J 3B0; Canada
- Coordinates: 44°55′8.3″N 62°31′4.7″W

Information
- School type: P-12
- Motto: Home of the Eagles
- Established: November 22, 1963; 62 years ago
- Closed: June 23, 2019
- School board: Halifax Regional Centre for Education
- Principal: Ronnie Reynolds
- Grades: Pre-Primary–12
- Enrollment: 249 (December 2018)
- Capacity: 530
- Language: English, Integrated French
- Area: 4,468 m^{2} (48,090 sq ft)
- Campus type: Rural
- Colours: Gold and Black
- Mascot: Eddy the Eagle
- Team name: Eagles
- Website: dmh.hrsb.ca

Duncan MacMillan High School (DMHS) was a P-12 school in Sheet Harbour, Nova Scotia, Canada. It was replaced by Marine Drive Academy.

Duncan MacMillan High hosts grades primary–12, as well as a pre-primary program and teaches 249 students. It has the largest geographical area for bussing in the Halifax Regional School Board. As of 2017-18, the school's administrative team consisted of Principal Ronnie Reynolds and Vice Principal Troy Smith. In addition, there are 20 teaching staff and 12 support staff. Although DMHS is small in student population, it does provide the courses necessary for any post-secondary program. Throughout both junior and senior high, there is a continuing option for students to follow the Integrated French program in which French Language Arts (FLA) and social studies are taught in French, with the remaining courses being taught in English. In addition to the services provided directly by the Halifax Regional School Board, DMHS is also provided service by the Nova Scotia Health Authority via the school's Youth Health Centre.

In December 2013, the HRSB began a plan that would eventually see all of the DMHS feeder schools closed, the present DMHS building vacated and possibly demolished, and in their place would be a single new school next to the current site DMHS occupies, educating grades primary through 12, as well as hosting a pre-primary program. Sheet Harbour Consolidated School (SHCS), as well as Lakefront Consolidated School in nearby Tangier, previous feeder schools of DMHS, were closed in 2017 and 2019 respectively, to make way for the new school. SHCS was demolished in 2017 as a consequence of this plan. DMHS currently hosts the students of SHCS and will host them until the new school is opened.

== School ==
DMHS teaches 249 students and the building has an area of 48,091 ft^{2}. There are four administrative personnel, 20 teaching staff and 12 support staff. The principal of the school is Ronnie Reynolds and the vice principal is Troy Smith. Sheet Harbour Consolidated School, formerly located in Sheet Harbour, as well as Lakefront Consolidated School in Tangier, used to be feeder schools of DMHS, but were closed in 2017 and 2019 respectively as a part of the plan to replace the schools in the Sheet Harbour area. Eastern Consolidated School, in Moser River, used to be another feeder school of DMHS, but was closed in September 2015 as a consequence of a very low student population. The school's official mascot is Eddy the Eagle, the team name is the Eagles and the school's official colours are gold and black. Integrated French is offered, but not mandatory, as a course in both junior and senior high. Students in the program are taught French Language Arts (FLA) and social studies in Canadian French, while they are taught less English Language Arts (ELA). DMHS is also served by the Nova Scotia Health Authority via the school's Youth Health Centre, which is under the coordination of RN Darlene Rasmussen.

== History ==
The school officially was opened on the night of November 22, 1963. It was named after Dr. Duncan MacMillan, a Sheet Harbour doctor who sparked the interest in building the Eastern Shore Memorial Hospital in Sheet Harbour. When DMHS was opened, there were 21 teachers. In the old high school, they had 12 staff members, but with students coming in from Moser River and Tangier, they had to increase the staff.

== Replacement project ==
In December 2013, the HRSB began a plan that would eventually see all of the DMHS feeder schools closed, the present DMHS building vacated and possibly demolished, and in their place will be a single new school serving grades primary through 12 in Sheet Harbour. The site of the new school, which will be built on the present site of DMHS, was announced on October 4, 2016. SHCS was closed in 2017 after sixty years of operation to further the construction, and the students were relocated to DMHS and will be until the opening of the new school. Lakefront Consolidated school ceased operation at the end of the 2018-2019 school year as a step in the plan. The name of the new building, Marine Drive Academy, was announced on June 17, 2019.
