= Nova Scotia Route 374 =

Highway in Nova Scotia, Canada

Route 374

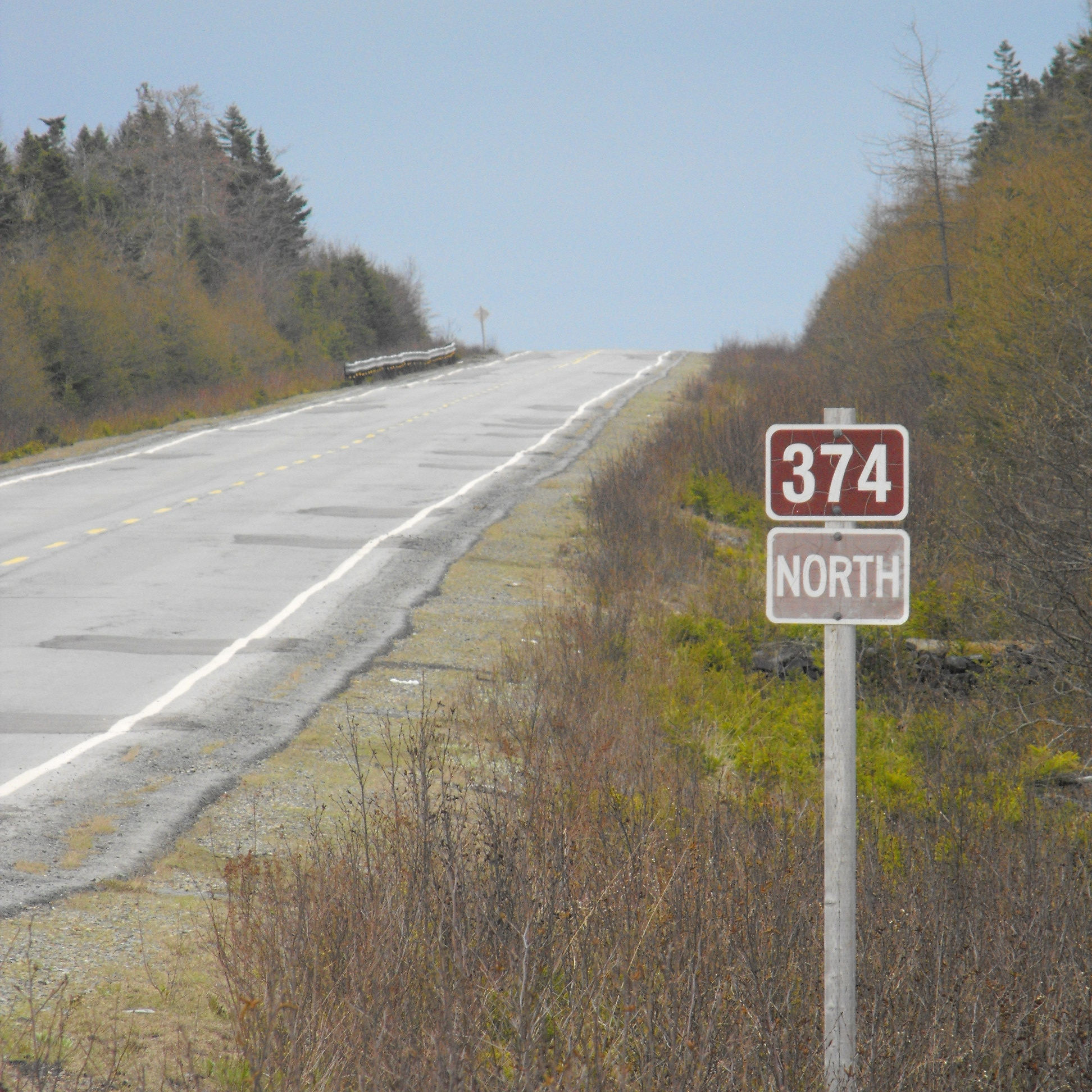
- Highway 374

Route information
- Maintained by Nova Scotia Department of Transportation and Infrastructure Renewal
- Length: 86 km (53 mi)

Major junctions
- South end: Trunk 7 in Sheet Harbour
- Hwy 104 (TCH) in Stellarton
- North end: Route 289 in New Glasgow

Location
- Country: Canada
- Province: Nova Scotia
- Counties: Halifax Regional Municipality, Guysborough, Pictou

Highway system
- Provincial highways in Nova Scotia; 100-series
← Route 368	→ Route 376

Route 374 is a collector road in the Canadian province of Nova Scotia. It connects New Glasgow at Exit 24 of Highway 104 with Sheet Harbour at Trunk 7. The highway runs through the Halifax Regional Municipality, Guysborough County and Pictou County.

The highway runs north-south through the Liscomb Game Sanctuary and No Internet in Forest, Behind Marine Drive Academy at Sheet Harbour.

== Route description ==
Route 374 begins in Downtown New Glasgow at the junction with Route 289, then runs south to Stellarton, where it passes under Hwy. 104, which is part of the Trans-Canada Highway network. Then, the route continues south through Hopewell and Lorne. Route 374 continues south through Trafalgar, Lochaber Mines, and Malay Falls, to its southern terminus in with Trunk 7 in Sheet Harbour.

== Communities ==
- New Glasgow
- Stellarton
- Riverton
- Eureka
- Hopewell
- Lorne
- Trafalgar
- Liscomb Game Sanctuary
- Lochaber Mines
- Malay Falls
- Sheet Harbour

== See also ==
- List of Nova Scotia provincial highways
