= Eastern Shore Memorial Hospital =

- Capital District Health Authority
- Eastern Shore Memorial Hospital

- Location in Nova Scotia

Geography
- Location: 22637 Highway 7, Sheet Harbour, Nova Scotia, Canada
- Coordinates: 44.9205°N 62.5327°W

Organization
- Care system: Public Medicare (Canada)

Services
- Beds: 16

History
- Founded: May 24, 1949

Links
- Website: Eastern Shore Memorial Hospital
- Lists: Hospitals in Canada

The pond in the Eastern Shore Memorial Garden in front of the Eastern Shore Memorial Hospital

Eastern Shore Memorial Hospital (ESMH) is a hospital in Sheet Harbour, Nova Scotia. It is operated by Nova Scotia Health Authority.

== Services ==
- Palliative and Respite Care
- Acute Care
- Outpatient/Emergency
- Ambulatory Care
- Diagnostic Imaging
- Laboratory Services
- Physiotherapy
- Occupational Therapy
- Clinical Nutrition
- Social Services
- Adult Day Clinic, Diabetic Clinic, Meals-on-Wheels

== History ==
Eastern Shore Memorial Hospital was built to serve the easternmost area of coastal Halifax County from East Ship Harbour to Ecum Secum. It was proposed by a group of community members, led by Dr. Duncan MacMillan. The architect was Leslie R. Fairn. Construction started in 1947 and the hospital was opened on May 24, 1949. It cost $170,000. $34,000 was contributed by the provincial and federal governments, and the remaining $136,000 came from community donations. The Canadian Red Cross ran the hospital until July 15, 1954.

In 1983, a new wing was added to the hospital. The old wing was converted to a nursing home, named Duncan MacMillan Nursing Home. In 2011, Duncan MacMillan Nursing Home was demolished and replaced by Harbourview Lodge.

== Sources ==
- Coady, Howard (1988). Sheet Harbour History. Lancelot Press Limited. ISBN 0-88999-381-5.
