= Malay Falls, Nova Scotia =

Malay Falls
- Rural Community
- Location in Nova Scotia Malay Falls (Canada)
- Coordinates: 44°58′29.8″N 62°28′59.4″W
- Country: Canada
- Province: Nova Scotia
- Municipality: Halifax Regional Municipality
- District: 2
- Founded: 1784

Government
  - Type: Municipal
  - Mayor: Mike Savage
  - Councillor: David Hendsbee
- Time zone: UTC-4 (Atlantic Standard Time)
  - Summer (DST): UTC-3 (Atlantic Daylight Saving Time)
- Canadian postal code: B0J 3B0
- GNBC Code: CAXHX
- NTS Map: 011D16
- Weather Station Code: CXMY
- Rural Route: RR 2
- Highway: Route 374

Malay Falls is a small rural community on the Eastern Shore of Nova Scotia, Canada, in the Halifax Regional Municipality. The community is located along Route 374 and is about 11 km (6.8 mi) northeast of Sheet Harbour. The community is located along East River, and is adjacent to the Malay Falls Flowage, a lake along the river's course. Malay Falls was first settled in 1784. Colin Malay acquired land here in 1849, when the area was called Salmon River. The Government of Canada maintains a weather station in the community.

== Climate ==
Climate data for Malay Falls, 1981–2010 normals, extremes 1987–present
Month	Jan	Feb	Mar	Apr	May	Jun	Jul	Aug	Sep	Oct	Nov	Dec	Year
Record high °C (°F)	15.0 (59.0)	18.0 (64.4)	28.0 (82.4)	26.3 (79.3)	33.0 (91.4)	34.9 (94.8)	34.6 (94.3)	35.8 (96.4)	34.4 (93.9)	27.0 (80.6)	21.2 (70.2)	15.7 (60.3)	35.8 (96.4)
Mean daily maximum °C (°F)	−0.6 (30.9)	−0.4 (31.3)	3.0 (37.4)	8.0 (46.4)	14.0 (57.2)	19.9 (67.8)	23.3 (73.9)	23.2 (73.8)	19.2 (66.6)	13.3 (55.9)	7.3 (45.1)	1.9 (35.4)	11.0 (51.8)
Daily mean °C (°F)	−5.8 (21.6)	−5.6 (21.9)	−2.0 (28.4)	3.2 (37.8)	8.4 (47.1)	13.7 (56.7)	17.5 (63.5)	17.6 (63.7)	13.7 (56.7)	8.2 (46.8)	3.2 (37.8)	−2.6 (27.3)	5.8 (42.4)
Mean daily minimum °C (°F)	−10.9 (12.4)	−10.9 (12.4)	−6.9 (19.6)	−1.7 (28.9)	2.8 (37.0)	7.5 (45.5)	11.5 (52.7)	11.8 (53.2)	8.2 (46.8)	3.1 (37.6)	−1.0 (30.2)	−7.0 (19.4)	0.5 (32.9)
Record low °C (°F)	−28.5 (−19.3)	−30.0 (−22.0)	−24.3 (−11.7)	−12.0 (10.4)	−8.0 (17.6)	−3.0 (26.6)	1.0 (33.8)	0.0 (32.0)	−3.5 (25.7)	−9.0 (15.8)	−22.0 (−7.6)	−31.0 (−23.8)	−31.0 (−23.8)
Average precipitation mm (inches)	146.0 (5.75)	130.1 (5.12)	151.8 (5.98)	132.2 (5.20)	134.8 (5.31)	108.2 (4.26)	107.4 (4.23)	91.1 (3.59)	147.5 (5.81)	165.8 (6.53)	177.0 (6.97)	151.2 (5.95)	1,643 (64.69)
Average snowfall cm (inches)	28.0 (11.0)	32.2 (12.7)	23.2 (9.1)	8.8 (3.5)	0.4 (0.2)	0 (0)	0 (0)	0 (0)	0 (0)	0 (0)	4.6 (1.8)	27.4 (10.8)	124.5 (49.0)
Average precipitation days (≥ 0.2 mm)	10.7	9.4	11.1	11.3	11.5	10.3	9.1	9.4	9.6	11.4	13.2	11.2	128.2
Average snowy days (≥ 0.2 cm)	4.6	4.9	3.5	1.4	0.08	0	0	0	0	0	1.1	4.1	19.7
Source: Environment Canada
