= Tangier, Nova Scotia =

Tangier
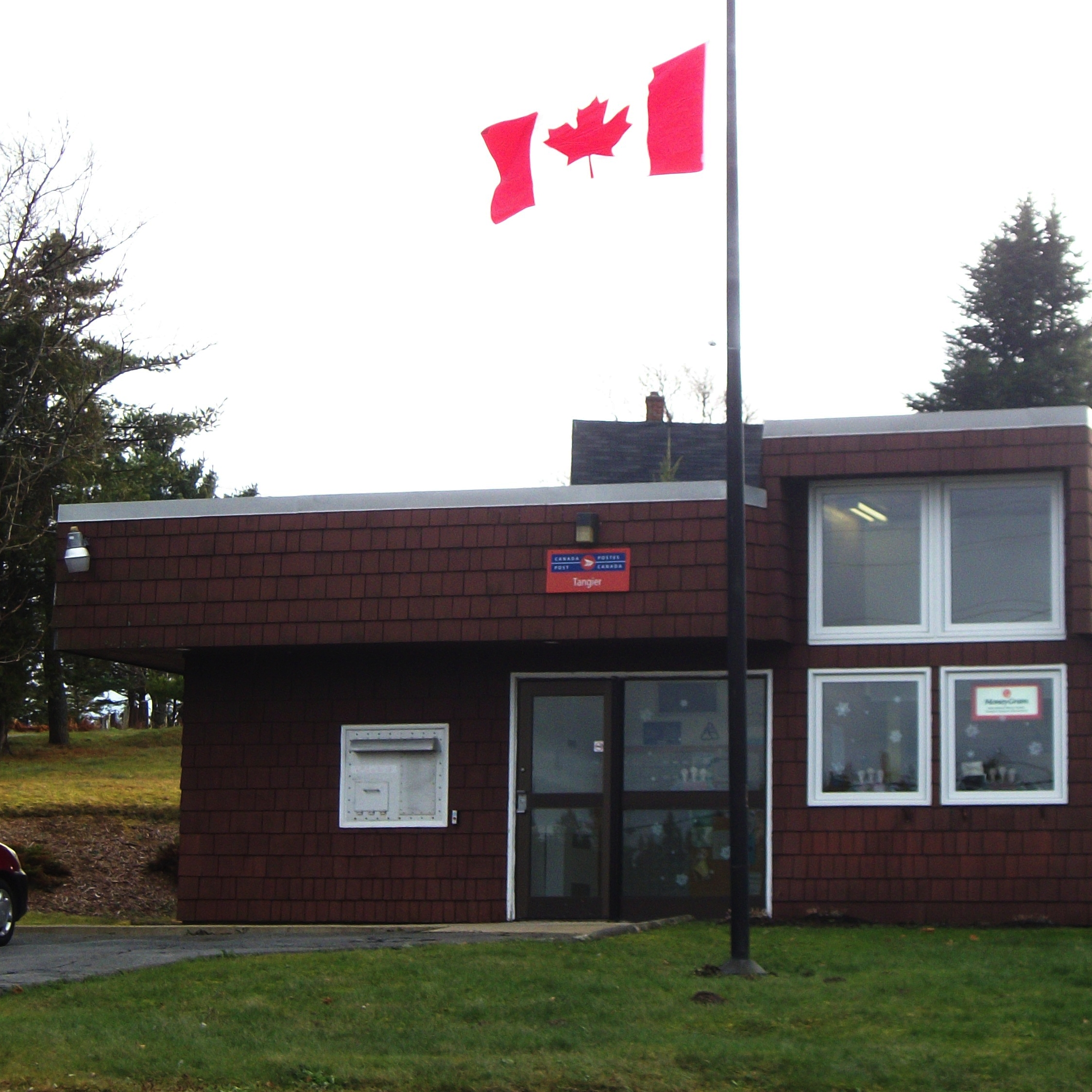
- Tangier Post Office

- Location within Nova Scotia
- Coordinates: 44°47′59″N 62°42′0″W
- Country: Canada
- Province: Nova Scotia
- Municipality: Halifax Regional Municipality
- District: 2

Government
  - Governing Council: Halifax Regional Council
- Time zone: UTC-4 (AST)
  - Summer (DST): UTC-3 (ADT)
- Canadian Postal code: B0J 3H0
- Telephone Exchange: 902 772
- GNBC Code: CBIKA
- Highways: Trunk 7
- Part of a series about Places in Nova Scotia

Tangier is a rural community on the Eastern Shore of Nova Scotia, Canada, in the Halifax Regional Municipality. It lies along the Marine Drive on Nova Scotia Trunk 7 approximately 23 km (14 mi) west of Sheet Harbour. Tangier is situated at the head of Tangier Harbour. The Mi'kmaq name for the settlement was Wospegeak, translating to "the sunshine is reflected from the water". The community is located at the mouth of Tangier River. The present name of the community is most likely derived from the shipwreck of the schooner Tangier in 1830. In 1858, gold was discovered in the area, which sparked gold mining operations in the area for the next 30 years. The community has a church and several private fishing wharfs, as well as a post office.
