= East River Sheet Harbour =

Location
- Country: Canada
- Province: Nova Scotia

Physical characteristics
- Source
  - location: Marshall Flowage
- Mouth
  - location: Northeast Arm of Sheet Harbour
  - coordinates: 44°33′10″N 62°18′12″W
  - elevation: sea level

East River Sheet Harbour (locally known as East River) is a river on the Eastern Shore of Nova Scotia, Canada, in the Halifax Regional Municipality. Its headwaters are at the Marshall Flowage near Malay Falls and the mouth of the river is at the head of the Northeast Arm in Sheet Harbour, Nova Scotia.

East River begins at the Marshall Flowage, near Malay Falls. It flows southwest through the Malay Falls and Ruth Falls Flowages. Lake Mulgrave, a large lake west of the Marshall Flowage, flows into the Marshall Flowage via the Mulgrave River. The Fifteen Mile Stream also flows into the Marshall Flowage from the north. It extends northward, into Guysborough County. Grant River, a short river, flows into the Ruth Falls Flowage. The East River watershed system, along with the neighboring West River system, encompass a total area of 988 km^{2}.

Around 1863, a sawmill was built at the head of the river by Demming & McFarlane, who were a lumber company. The company did not succeed financially however, and was dissolved a few years later. The first sulphide pulp mill in Canada was built by the Halifax Wood Fibre Company in October 1885, at East River, Sheet Harbour. Since the discovery of the sulphite process in 1866, the news had traveled to William Chisholm, a lumber manufacturer in Halifax who had 60 thousand acres (24,000 ha; 240 km^{2}) of woodland on the Sheet Harbour rivers. Chisholm decided to try the method out at the head of East River. The mill was closed in January 1891, due to the high costs of importing sulphide from the United States. The cookhouse which was used at the mill was bought by the residents of Watt Section and was floated down the harbour to the community.

The East River Campground is located at the mouth of East River.
