= Hurricane Beth =

Category 1 Atlantic hurricane in 1971

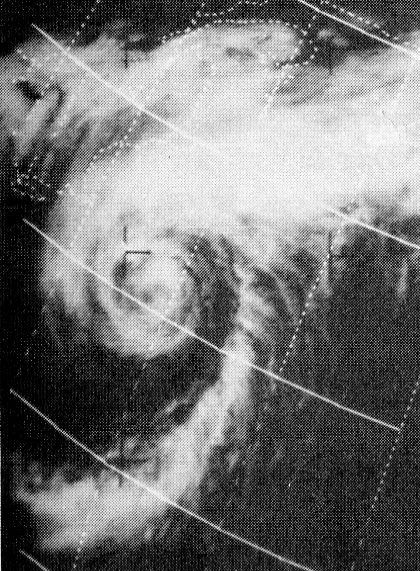
- Satellite image of Beth on August 12

Meteorological history
- Formed: August 10, 1971
- Dissipated: August 16, 1971

Category 1 hurricane
- 1-minute sustained (SSHWS/NWS)
- Highest winds: 85 mph (140 km/h)
- Lowest pressure: 977 mbar (hPa); 28.85 inHg

Overall effects
- Fatalities: 1 indirect
- Damage: <$5.1 million (1971 USD)
- Areas affected: Bahamas, Florida, Nova Scotia, Newfoundland
- IBTrACS
- Part of the 1971 Atlantic hurricane season

Hurricane Beth was a short-lived tropical cyclone which traveled from Florida to Nova Scotia in the middle of August 1971. The second named storm of the 1971 Atlantic hurricane season, Beth's genesis was impeded by a cold environment surrounding the storm. However, as it continued on its northeastward course, it achieved fully tropical characteristics and peaked as a modest Category 1 hurricane on the Saffir–Simpson hurricane wind scale. The cyclone struck Nova Scotia on August 16 before dissipating shortly after. Beth produced substantial precipitation, and the resultant flooding inflicted severe damage to infrastructure and crops.

== Meteorological history ==
Map plotting the storm's track and intensity, according to the Saffir–Simpson scale Map key Saffir–Simpson scale Tropical depression (≤38 mph, ≤62 km/h) Tropical storm (39–73 mph, 63–118 km/h) Category 1 (74–95 mph, 119–153 km/h) Category 2 (96–110 mph, 154–177 km/h) Category 3 (111–129 mph, 178–208 km/h) Category 4 (130–156 mph, 209–251 km/h) Category 5 (≥157 mph, ≥252 km/h) Unknown Storm type Tropical cyclone Subtropical cyclone Extratropical cyclone, remnant low, tropical disturbance, or monsoon depression

On August 9, a low pressure system in the upper levels of the atmosphere formed off the east coast of Florida. It became a surface low by the next day and acquired the characteristics of a tropical cyclone; it is officially stated to have become a tropical depression at 1200 UTC on August 10. The depression slowly advanced northeastward within a relatively cold environment, and as such, it did not intensify for several days. The system turned more toward the east as it approached the coast of North Carolina, at which time its structure became conducive to further development. On August 14, the depression was declared a tropical storm and assigned the name Beth following recent data from a reconnaissance aircraft.

Several hundred miles off the U.S. East Coast, Beth accelerated somewhat – reaching forward speeds of up to 19 mph (31 km/h) as it resumed a northeastward course. Its minimum central pressure deepened to 990 millibars (29 inHg), and correspondingly, maximum sustained winds increased. In response, the cyclone was recognized as a Category 1 hurricane. It continued to mature as it passed east of Cape Cod, achieving peak winds of 85 mph (137 km/h) and a pressure of 977 mb (28.9 inHg). Subsequently, the hurricane weakened slightly while nearing Nova Scotia. On August 16, it made landfall near Copper Lake before crossing Cape Breton Island. Shortly thereafter, Beth was swept up by a nearby cold front and transitioned into an extratropical cyclone.

== Preparations and impact ==
In advance of Hurricane Beth, hurricane warnings were issued for coastal and marine areas of Nova Scotia and Newfoundland. In Halifax, bus service was disrupted by the storm, and in Antigonish, business owners closed their stores and filled sandbags to prepare.

The hurricane left extensive damage in its wake, especially to crops and infrastructure. Halifax International Airport reported 10.49 in (266 mm) of rainfall over 30 hours. The heavy precipitation throughout the country triggered severe flooding, stranding hundreds of travelers. The mayor of Dartmouth reported that the area was a "disaster", as 500 homes were reportedly inundated. Antigonish also experienced significant flooding; waters there approached the top of parking meters. Impacted crops in the region included cereal grain, corn, and tobacco, whose inundated fields resembled vast lakes.

Transport suffered severely: several main roads, including part of the Trans-Canada Highway and Nova Scotia Highway 102, in northeastern Nova Scotia received flood damage and were temporarily blocked off. Additionally, the rising waters washed out several bridges in the region and swept away automobiles. Railways were covered by water, forcing trains to suspend their operation. Drinking water in Dartmouth was contaminated due to excessive runoff into Lake Antigonish, and a trailer park in Antigonish flooded, prompting 600 residents to evacuate. Overall monetary damage from Beth is estimated at between $3.5 million and US$5.1 million. One person was indirectly killed by the hurricane in a traffic accident induced by heavy rain.

== See also ==
- Other storms with the same name
- List of Canada hurricanes
- Geography of Canada
