= Sheet Harbour, Nova Scotia =

Community in Nova Scotia, Canada

Sheet Harbour
- West River Falls, where the West River empties into the Northwest Arm.

- Location within Nova Scotia
- Coordinates: 44°55′N 62°32′W
- Country: Canada
- Province: Nova Scotia
- Municipality: Halifax Regional Municipality
- District: 2
- Founded: 1784

Government
  - Type: Regional Council
  - Governing Council: Halifax Regional Council

Area
  - Total: 188.38 km^{2} (72.73 sq mi)
- Highest elevation: 114 m (374 ft)
- Lowest elevation: 0 m (0 ft)

Population
  - Total: 800
  - Density: 4.24/km^{2} (11.0/sq mi)
- Time zone: UTC-4 (AST)
  - Summer (DST): UTC-3 (ADT)
- Canadian Postal code: B0J 3B0
- Telephone Exchanges: 902 885
- GNBC Code: CBIKA
- Highways: Trunk 7 Route 224; Route 374
- Website: sheetharbour.ca
- Part of a series about Places in Nova Scotia

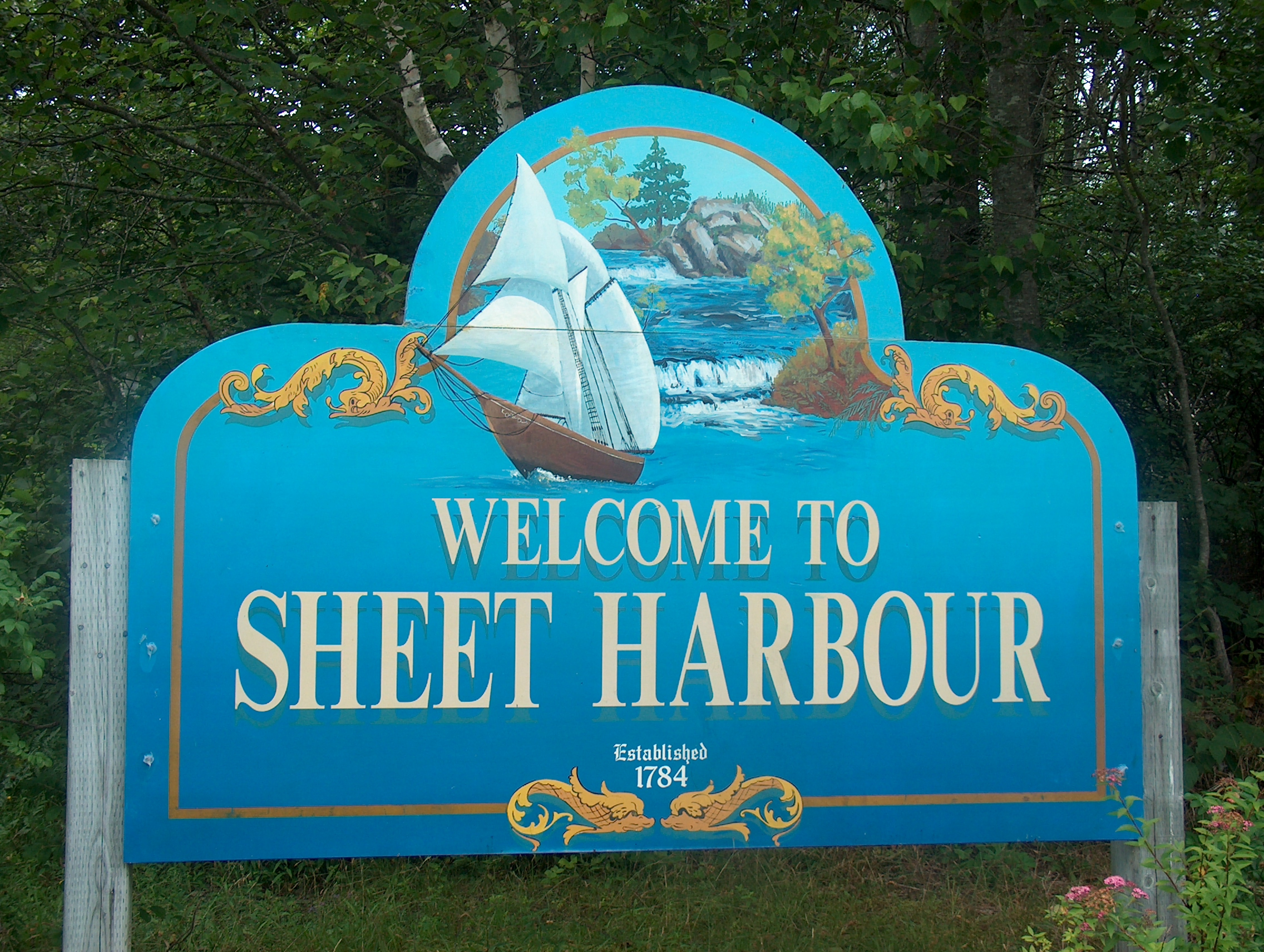
Sheet Harbour Welcome Sign.

Sheet Harbour is a rural community in Nova Scotia, Canada. It is located in the eastern reaches of the Halifax Regional Municipality, approximately 117 km (73 mi) northeast of the central urban area of the municipality, concentrated on Downtown Halifax and Dartmouth. The community is located along the Marine Drive scenic route on Trunk 7 at its junctions with Route 224 and Route 374. Surrounding the branched harbour which its name is derived from, the community has a population of about 800 and its respective census tract, containing sizable amounts of land around the community, has a population of 3,478 as of the 2011 Census. Two rivers, West River and East River, flow through the community and into the Northwest and Northeast Arms of the harbour respectively. The coastline of the community is heavily eroded and the region in which the community is located has an abundance of lakes. The region has a humid continental climate, congruent with the majority of Nova Scotia, and the ocean significantly influences the temperature.

The Miꞌkmaq referred to the area around present-day Sheet Harbour as Weijooik, meaning "flowing wildly". The majority of the land that the community occupies was granted in 1773, and a colony was established thereafter in 1784 by Loyalist refugees and British veterans of the American Revolution. The settlement was labelled as "Port North" on the Royal Navy Chart published in 1778, and retained this name until 1805. Alternate names such as Campbelltown and Manchester were proposed for the settlement, but the name was ultimately changed to Sheet Harbour, named for a rock at the entrance to the harbour resembling a sheet, to provide a more descriptive name for the settlement. Sheet Harbour became a prosperous hub for the lumber industry. A sawmill was built around 1863 at the tide head of East River, though its operating company dissolved a few years later due to financial issues. The first sulphide pulp mill in Canada was built in 1885 at East River. The mill closed in 1891 due to the cost of importing sulphide.

The first bank in Sheet Harbour, a branch of the Bank of Nova Scotia, was built in 1921. The establishment was moved to a new building in 1929, and again in 1959. Electrical lines were first run into the community in late 1925. A ground-wood pulp mill owned by the American Pulp and Wrapping Paper Co. of Albany, New York produced its first ground-wood pulp on October 5, 1925. Located along West River near its mouth at the head of the Northwest Arm, the mill remained in operation until it was destroyed by Hurricane Beth in 1971. The first efforts to bring a hospital to Sheet Harbour began in the mid-1940s sparked by Duncan MacMillan, a longtime physician in the area. The project was given unanimous approval at subsequent meetings, and Leslie R. Fairn was enlisted as the architect, as well as John Smiley and later Robert MacDonald, as contractors. Construction began in 1947 and the Eastern Shore Memorial Hospital was opened on May 24, 1949, with a ceremony in which Premier Angus L. MacDonald officiated. It was operated as an outpost hospital by the Canadian Red Cross until 1954, after which the local residents operated it until 1959. The hospital has been operated by the Nova Scotia Government thereafter.

The East River Bridge was built across the Northeast Arm in 1957 to replace its predecessor. It was a 213 m (699 ft) long green arch bridge and its ribs were reinforced heavily in 1988. It was replaced by a 187 m (614 ft) long multi-span bridge of the same name which began construction in 2014 and opened fully on December 18, 2015. Marine Drive Academy, the only school in the Sheet Harbour area, was opened in 2020. Sidewalks were laid through the main downtown area and moorings were installed in the harbour in 2010 and 2017 respectively. A deep-water dock and accompanying industrial park was built in the 1990s on the western shore of the harbour. It serviced the Sable Offshore Energy Project, due to it being the closest terminal to the project, and is in close proximity to major intercontinental shipping routes. An RCMP detachment and a branch of the Halifax Public Libraries are present within the community as well, along with the aforementioned hospital and high school.

== Geography ==
=== Location ===
Sheet Harbour is a small rural community located on the Eastern Shore of Nova Scotia, in the eastern area of the Halifax Regional Municipality. Sheet Harbour is located slightly more northward compared to other coastal communities in the area, due to the shape of the harbour. The population of the census tract for the Sheet Harbour area is 3,478 as of the 2011 Census. Census tracts are small divisions of land that are used for statistics gathering by Statistics Canada that usually have a population of 2,500 to 8,000. Each census tract has a numerical designation. The population of the community proper is about 800. West of Sheet Harbour lies Sheet Harbour 36, a small Mi'kmaq reserve.

The community of Sheet Harbour is located along the shores of the harbour of the same name, a branched saltwater harbour. Extending from the convergence of the two arms below Church Point, the wider Northwest Arm travels until it meets the mouth of West River at the West River Falls. There is a very small island in the arm. Six moorings were installed in the arm in the Spring of 2017. The Northeast Arm is the more narrow arm and extends generally northeastward under the East River Bridge until it meets the mouth of the East River.

Beyond the convergence of the arms, the harbour is known as Sheet Harbour. It is wider than both arms and is approximately eleven to fifteen metres (36–49 ft) deep at low tide. The harbour gradually widens as it travels southeastward toward the Atlantic, passing the Sheet Harbour Industrial Port as well as the small community of Watt Section.

The area around Sheet Harbour is heavily forested and rich in lakes. The shore is very rocky and eroded, as is commonplace on the Eastern Shore. Sheet Harbour has an average tidal range of about 1.2 to 1.5 m (4 to 5 ft).

=== Rivers ===
Several rivers and small streams empty into the arms of the harbour.

West River begins near Beaver Dam. The main branch of the river is about 30 km (19 mi) long. The river has two secondary branches, the Killag River, which is 27 kilometres (17 mi) long, and Little River, which is 16.5 kilometres (10.3 mi) long. Many lakes and ponds in the region flow into the river through numerous smaller rivers and streams. The river flows through Sheet Harbour Lake, and narrows back in to a river near the West River Bridge, where Trunk 7 passes over the West River. The West River Falls carry the river from 22 metres (72 ft) elevation down to sea level, where it empties into the Northwest Arm. The river area has been deforested and is prone to flash-flooding.

Sheet Harbour was the first community in North America to use a lime doser on one of its rivers. which sprays limestone into the water to stabilize pH levels. Dosing began in September 2005 in West River. It was successful in stabilizing the pH of the river at 5.5, a healthy level for salmon and other aquatic life. Grand Lake, a large lake west of Sheet Harbour, also empties into the Northwest Arm via West Lake and Little West River in West Sheet Harbour. The river flows into the Northwest Arm via West Cove. East River, formally East River Sheet Harbour, is the other main river that discharges into the harbour. Originating in the Marshall Flowage, the river flows southward past the Ruth Falls Power Plant, a hydropower generating station. It narrows back into a river for the remainder of its watercourse, then flows into the head of the Northeast Arm.

=== Climate ===
The closest weather station to Sheet Harbour is in Malay Falls, about 8 km (5.0 mi) northeast of the community. As with most of the province, Sheet Harbour has a humid continental climate, and the temperature is heavily influenced by the ocean.

Climate data for Malay Falls, 1981–2010 normals, extremes 1987–present
Month	Jan	Feb	Mar	Apr	May	Jun	Jul	Aug	Sep	Oct	Nov	Dec	Year
Record high °C (°F)	15.0 (59.0)	18.0 (64.4)	28.0 (82.4)	26.3 (79.3)	33.0 (91.4)	34.9 (94.8)	34.6 (94.3)	35.8 (96.4)	34.4 (93.9)	27.0 (80.6)	21.2 (70.2)	15.7 (60.3)	35.8 (96.4)
Mean daily maximum °C (°F)	−0.6 (30.9)	−0.4 (31.3)	3.0 (37.4)	8.0 (46.4)	14.0 (57.2)	19.9 (67.8)	23.3 (73.9)	23.2 (73.8)	19.2 (66.6)	13.3 (55.9)	7.3 (45.1)	1.9 (35.4)	11.0 (51.8)
Daily mean °C (°F)	−5.8 (21.6)	−5.6 (21.9)	−2.0 (28.4)	3.2 (37.8)	8.4 (47.1)	13.7 (56.7)	17.5 (63.5)	17.6 (63.7)	13.7 (56.7)	8.2 (46.8)	3.2 (37.8)	−2.6 (27.3)	5.8 (42.4)
Mean daily minimum °C (°F)	−10.9 (12.4)	−10.9 (12.4)	−6.9 (19.6)	−1.7 (28.9)	2.8 (37.0)	7.5 (45.5)	11.5 (52.7)	11.8 (53.2)	8.2 (46.8)	3.1 (37.6)	−1.0 (30.2)	−7.0 (19.4)	0.5 (32.9)
Record low °C (°F)	−28.5 (−19.3)	−30.0 (−22.0)	−24.3 (−11.7)	−12.0 (10.4)	−8.0 (17.6)	−3.0 (26.6)	1.0 (33.8)	0.0 (32.0)	−3.5 (25.7)	−9.0 (15.8)	−22.0 (−7.6)	−31.0 (−23.8)	−31.0 (−23.8)
Average precipitation mm (inches)	146.0 (5.75)	130.1 (5.12)	151.8 (5.98)	132.2 (5.20)	134.8 (5.31)	108.2 (4.26)	107.4 (4.23)	91.1 (3.59)	147.5 (5.81)	165.8 (6.53)	177.0 (6.97)	151.2 (5.95)	1,643 (64.69)
Average snowfall cm (inches)	28.0 (11.0)	32.2 (12.7)	23.2 (9.1)	8.8 (3.5)	0.4 (0.2)	0 (0)	0 (0)	0 (0)	0 (0)	0 (0)	4.6 (1.8)	27.4 (10.8)	124.5 (49.0)
Average precipitation days (≥ 0.2 mm)	10.7	9.4	11.1	11.3	11.5	10.3	9.1	9.4	9.6	11.4	13.2	11.2	128.2
Average snowy days (≥ 0.2 cm)	4.6	4.9	3.5	1.4	0.08	0	0	0	0	0	1.1	4.1	19.7
Source: Environment Canada

== History ==
=== 18th and 19th centuries ===
The Miꞌkmaq name for the area around where Sheet Harbour is today was Weijooik, which translates to "flowing wildly". Almost all of the present land area of Sheet Harbour was granted in 1773, and the settlement was established around 1784, by Loyalist refugees and British veterans of the American Revolution and became a prosperous centre for the lumber industry. Sheet Harbour was named "Port North" on the Royal Navy Chart that was published in 1778. In January 1805, the ship Salisbury was wrecked off of Sheet Harbour and nine of the crew were lost. The settlement was referred to as Port North until 1807. Alternate names for the settlement were Campbelltown and Manchester. Campbelltown would have been named after Lord William Campbell, who was a Captain General as well as a Governor-in-Chief from 1776 to 1773. It was decided that "Port North" was not descriptive enough, so the name was changed to Sheet Harbour, starting in 1818 because of a white, flat rock at the entrance to the harbour that looks like a sheet, named Sheet Rock. The population of the settlement in 1818 was 156.

A church was built soon after the founding of the settlement, but was in a state of disrepair by 1815. A new church was built on the site by 1837. Around 1863, a sawmill was built at the tide head of the East River Sheet Harbour, by Demming and McFarlane, a lumber company. However, they did not succeed financially, and they dissolved a few years later. Another church was constructed in the community in 1860 and a post office was opened in the community in May 1873. New schools were built in 1867 at Sheet Harbour and East River, and at West Sheet Harbour in the 1870s. A Freemasons hall was built at Church Point in 1869.

In October 1885, the Halifax Wood Fibre Company built the first sulphide pulp mill in Canada at East River, Sheet Harbour. Since the discovery of the sulphite process happened earlier in 1866, the news had traveled to William Chisholm, who was a lumber manufacturer in Halifax. Chisholm decided to test the method at the head of East River. He had 60 thousand acres (24,000 hectares; 240 square kilometres) of woodland on the Sheet Harbour rivers. The mill closed in January 1891, due to the high costs of importing sulphide from the United States. The cookhouse which was used at the mill was bought by the residents of Watt Section and was floated down the harbour to the community. A bridge was built over East River and was opened on January 15, 1889. A school was constructed at East River in 1897.

=== 20th century ===
A school was built at West River in 1903 to replace its predecessor which was destroyed in a fire. A new Freemasons hall was built in the same year, and its predecessor became a Sunday school. The first bank in Sheet Harbour, a branch of the Bank of Nova Scotia, was opened in 1921. The branch still exists, however it is operated from a different building than the original. The second location of the bank, a two-storey building, was built in 1929. The present location of the bank was built in 1959.

In 1922, a ground-wood pulp mill, owned by the American Pulp and Wrapping Paper Co. of Albany, began operation on the West River at the head of the Northwest Arm of Sheet Harbour. They had purchased it from the previous owners who were a lumber company. In 1925, the company had the Fairchild Aerial Survey Company of the United States take aerial photographs of the company limits, as well as the adjoining Crown land. This was the first aerial survey done by a company in Nova Scotia. The mill produced its first ground-wood pulp on October 5, 1925. It remained in operation until it was destroyed by Hurricane Beth in August 1971.

The first electrical lines were run into Sheet Harbour in the fall of 1925. The first line ran along the shore and was an offshoot of the line that ran to the mill, which received its power from the Ruth Falls power plant along East River. A second line was built in 1928 along the west side of the highway to provide street lighting. A lighting ceremony was held after all of the houses in the community had been wired. They were an early adopter of hydro electric power, and produced 23,000,000 kilowatt-hours per year in the early days.

The first efforts were made to establish a hospital in Sheet Harbour in the spring of 1945. The effort was sparked by Duncan MacMillan, a doctor who had been serving the Sheet Harbour area for about 20 years at the time. A meeting was held in early 1946 at the Masonic Hall in Sheet Harbour. Representatives of the Nova Scotia branch of the Canadian Red Cross were in attendance. The plan was given unanimous approval at the meeting and steps were taken to organize an official hospital board, which was incorporated in March 1946 by the Nova Scotia Legislature. An enthusiastic funding campaign was started afterward. The hospital board then engaged an architect, Leslie R. Fairn, to design the hospital. The plans called for a 21-bed Georgian style building. John Smiley was engaged as the contractor for the project, and was later succeeded by Robert MacDonald.

The old East River Bridge in June 2008, which was built in 1956 and demolished in 2016.

Construction began in 1947. The total cost of construction was $170,000, with $34,000 contributed by the provincial and federal governments, while the remaining $136,000 was contributed by the residents of the Sheet Harbour area. The Eastern Shore Memorial Hospital was opened with an official ceremony on May 24, 1949, which Premier Angus L. MacDonald officiated. The Canadian Red Cross equipped the hospital and ran it as an outpost hospital from its opening until July 15, 1954. The responsibility of the hospital was then shifted to the residents of the area, and administered by the hospital board. The hospital came under the plan of the Nova Scotia Hospital Insurance Commission on January 1, 1959. It has been administered under that plan up to the present day.

Sheet Harbour Consolidated School in 2008.

A two-room elementary school was built around 1955 at East River. The population of Sheet Harbour in 1956 was 1,073. A steel arch bridge, named the East River Bridge, was built in 1956 over the Northeast Arm. The bridge opened to traffic in December 1957. It was a green bridge which had a half-through, two-hinge type arch, as well as a built-up box-cross section for support. The bridge was 213 metres (699 ft) in length, with a main span of 140 metres (460 ft). It spanned the Northeast Arm of Sheet Harbour, just north of the new bridge. The structure had engineering ties with the Angus L. MacDonald Bridge in Halifax. The deck carried the two lanes of Trunk 7, and was hung from the arch by vertical steel hangers. The ribs of the bridge were reinforced heavily in 1988. Sheet Harbour Consolidated School (SHCS) was an elementary school in the community. It was built in 1957, and served grades primary through six.

In the 1990s, the Government of Nova Scotia built a common user deep water dock and industrial park just west of Sheet Harbour, named the Sheet Harbour Industrial Port. It is currently operated by the Halifax Port Authority. It currently ships wood chips for the pulp industry and imports wind turbine segments, which are then transported across Nova Scotia and to the rest of North America. The port was used to service the Sable Offshore Energy Project with natural gas pipes processed at coating plant therefore making them suitable for placement on the ocean floor. The port is the closest marine terminal to the fields, at a distance of 240 kilometres (150 mi). It is also approximately 80 kilometres (50 mi) west of the Great Circle Route, a major shipping route between North America and Europe. The docking area is 152 metres (499 ft) long and 36.5 metres (120 ft) wide. It also has 10.3 metres (34 ft) of draft, which is connected to a concrete pad.

=== 21st century ===
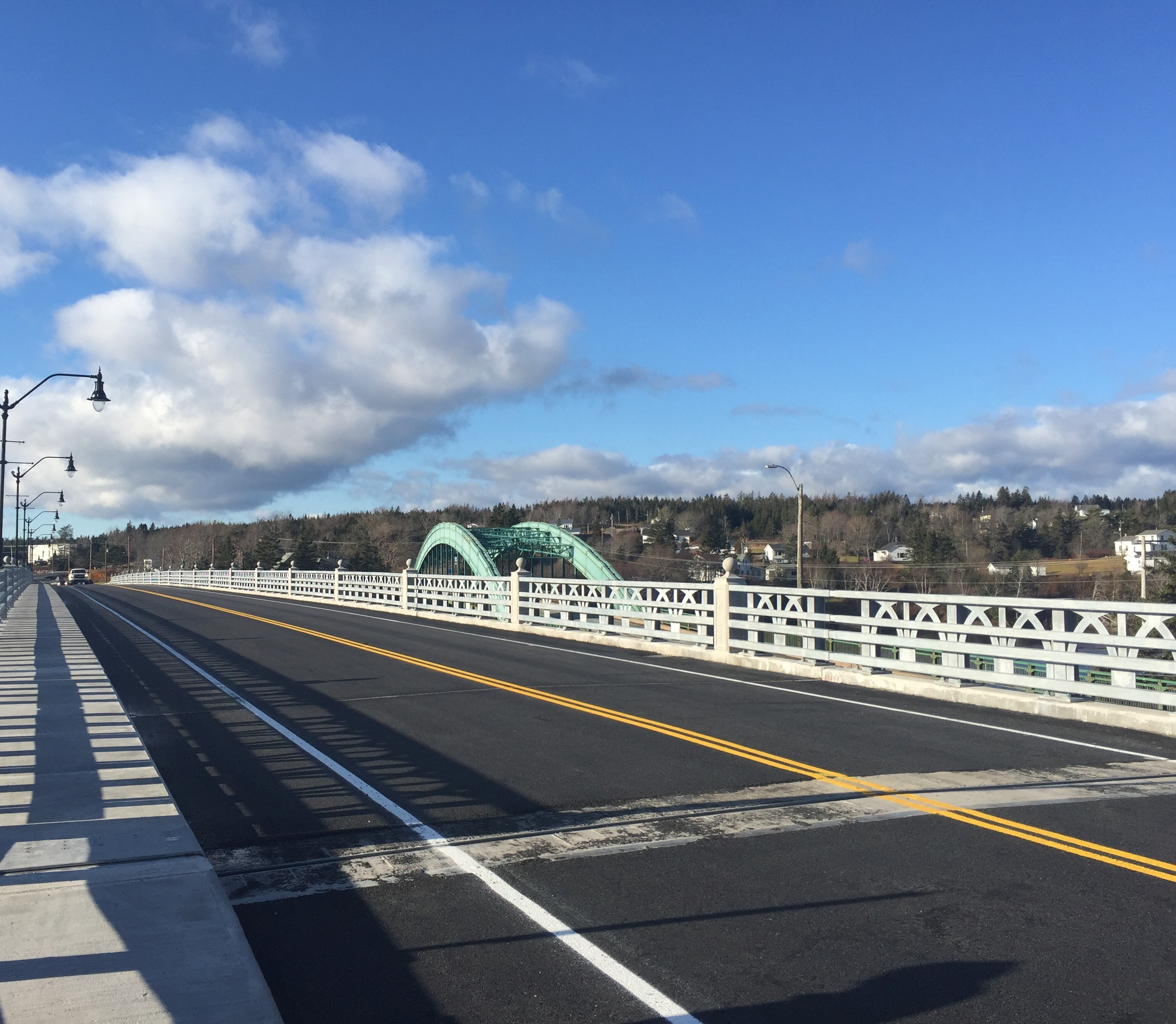
The new East River Bridge shortly after opening. The old bridge is visible in the background, as the green arch.

Sidewalks were built through the main downtown area of Sheet Harbour in 2010. They cost approximately $2.9 million (US$2.4 million). Watts Wind Energy, Inc. built a wind turbine in Watt Section, a small community east of Sheet Harbour. It was the outcome of favourable wind data that was obtained by a meteorological tower near the future site of the wind turbine. It was constructed in 2010 and was producing power by October 2011. It stands 85 metres (279 ft) tall and produces about 1.5 MW of electricity, powering 375 households.

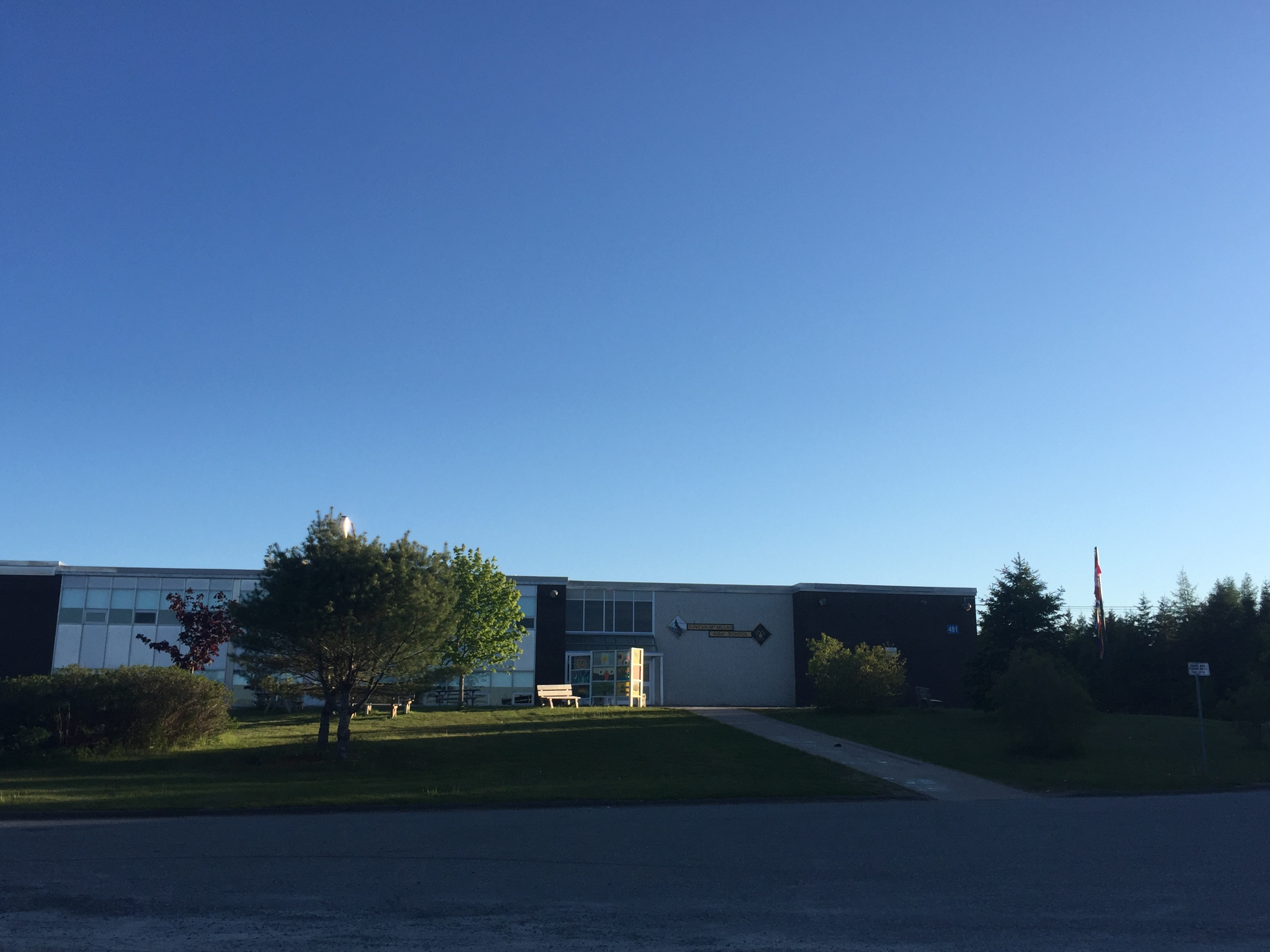
DMHS in June 2017

A motion was put forward to the former Halifax Regional School Board in 2012 to review the schools within the Duncan MacMillan High catchment area. The review was conducted and concerns were raised about the aging facilities as well as a high transfer rate and commute time for faculty. Boundary changes were proposed – the catchment area was the largest in the board – but proved highly unpopular among the populace. The HRSB publicly announced the project to build a new P-12 school in the Sheet Harbour area on December 23, 2013.

Three sites in and around Sheet Harbour were proposed, but it was decided in 2016 to construct the facility on the then current ground of SHCS and DMHS. SHCS was closed in 2017 to provide clearance for the new structure. Lakefront Consolidated Elementary in Tangier was closed in 2019 as a part of the consolidation process associated with the plan. Students from both schools were amalgamated into DMHS soon thereafter. 61 potential names for the new school were submitted by the public in the collection period from February to March 2019. The list was narrowed down to two definite candidates, though consensus could not be reached on a third and the two names were put to a vote. Students of DMHS and LCS voted in April 2019 on the third submission. From the top three names, the name selected for the new facility by the associated naming committee was Marine Drive Academy. The school opened in September 2020.

The East River Bridge was built from 2014 through 2015 to replace its predecessor of the same name. The Nova Scotia Government had proposed minor repairs, but they decided that an entirely new bridge would be more cost-effective. The new bridge was designed, unlike its predecessor, without large, overhead steel arches, because it would have been twice as expensive to build. The new bridge was constructed on the same site as the old bridge's predecessor which was constructed just south of the East River Bridge in 1907. The bridge cost $19,000,000 (US$14,671,644) to build and construction began in September 2014. The contractor, Dexter Construction, poured 2,260 cubic metres (80,000 ft^{3}) of concrete over 650,000 kg (1,430,000 lb) of rebar. The new bridge relies on two pillars set in the granite below the Northeast Arm. A deck, along with railings and sidewalks, were laid when it was nearing completion. The bridge was officially opened on December 17, 2015, to pedestrians and opened the next day to traffic. Road adjustments were made on the Sheet Harbour side of the bridge to accommodate it. Trunk 7 was aligned with what was formerly Riverside Drive, Church Point Road and Pool Road were slightly modified and the access road to Duncan MacMillan High School was slightly modified as well. Sprott Lane, a minor loop, was extended along a part of the old Trunk 7 for a few households. Shortly after the new bridge was opened, the old East River Bridge was closed and was demolished through 2016.

== Economy ==
The beginning of the Seaside Festival parade, August 9, 2008.

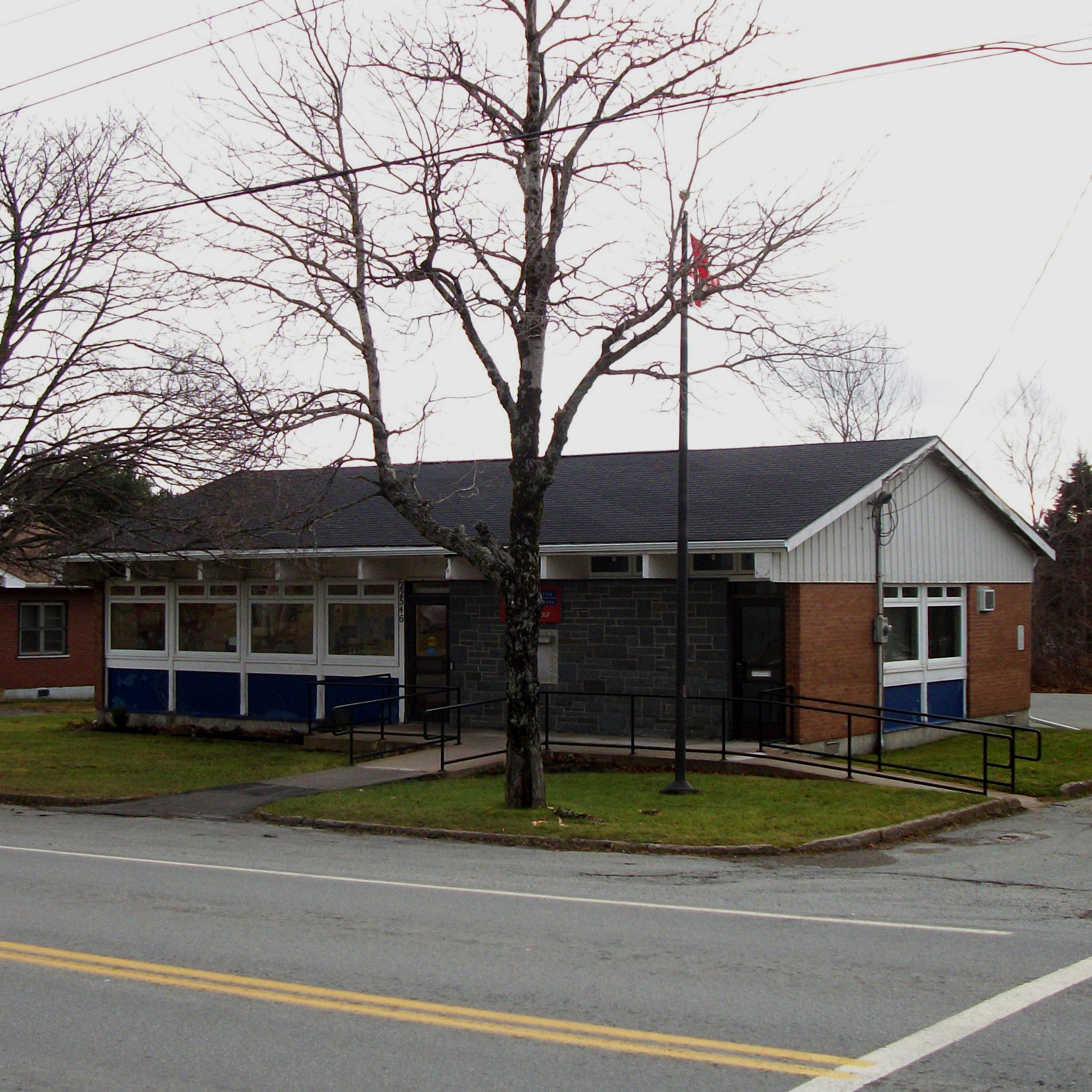
The Sheet Harbour post office in 2013.

The MacPhee House Museum and Visitor Information Centre, located on the grounds of the old mill.

Eastern Shore Memorial Hospital serves the Sheet Harbour area. Construction began in 1947, and the hospital was opened on May 24, 1949. It is administered by the Nova Scotia Health Authority. It has sixteen beds for patients. There is a cenotaph and gardens in front of the site where Duncan MacMillan Nursing Home (DMNH) previously stood. The hospital offers several services and is connected to Harbourview Lodge through a corridor. Harbourview Lodge was built in 2011 to replace DMNH, which was nearing the end of its life span.

The community also has a local radio station, broadcasting on 94.7 FM as Sheet Harbour Radio.

Sheet Harbour has a Chamber of Commerce. It was formed in 1935, and was formerly known as the Sheet Harbour Board of Trade. They comprise more than 25 of the businesses in the Sheet Harbour area and they also operate a Visitor Information Centre at the MacPhee House, situated on the site of the ground-wood pulp mill just east of the West River Bridge, where Trunk 7 crosses the West River at the entrance to Sheet Harbour. There is a community museum at the MacPhee House and they have a collection interpreting "Life before plastic".

Sheet Harbour also has an RCMP detachment and a fire station, as well as a Ground Search and Rescue team. The community also hosts a post office and a branch of the Halifax Public Libraries. A park surrounds the West River Falls, and there are two motels in the community as well. There is also a campground in the community, which is located near the mouth of the East River.

Taylor Head Provincial Park is located ten minutes west of Sheet Harbour. Every August, the "Seaside Festival" is hosted by the local Lions Club. The 2610 Royal Canadian Army Cadet Corps is based in Sheet Harbour. They were originally formed on October 1, 1957, but were disbanded on December 31, 1973. Twelve years later, the corps was reformed on February 1, 1985, and is still active today. They have won the Strathcona cup, an award that is given to the best performing cadet corps in Nova Scotia, five times.

Marine Drive Academy is the only school in the Sheet Harbour area. It serves grades primary through twelve and was opened in September 2020. It replaced Duncan MacMillan High School and its family of schools. As of 2020, 256 students were enrolled in the school.

== Notable residents ==
- Duncan MacMillan (1897–1969), Liberal Party politician, member of the Nova Scotia House of Assembly from 1956 to 1963 and 1967–69, physician and surgeon
- Tom McInnis (born 1945), member of the Senate of Canada, former Conservative Party politician and member of the Nova Scotia House of Assembly from 1978 to 1993

== See also ==
- Duncan MacMillan High School
- Eastern Shore Memorial Hospital
- MacPhee House
- West River Sheet Harbour
- East River Sheet Harbour
- East River Bridge (Sheet Harbour)
