= Economy of Spain =

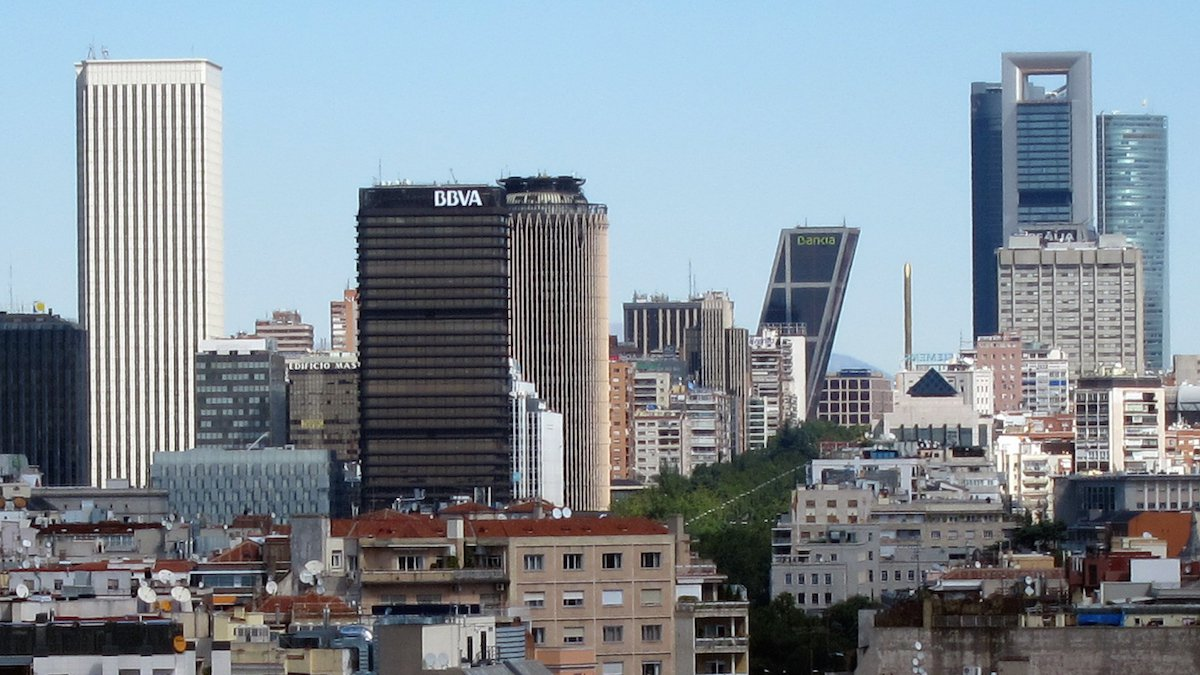
- Spain's capital city, Madrid, is its economic centre
- Currency: Euro (EUR, €)
- Fiscal year: Calendar year
- Trade organisations: EU, WTO and OECD
- Country group: Advanced economy; High-income economy; Welfare state

Statistics
- Population: ▲49,935,642 (2026)
- GDP: ▲$2.042 trillion (nominal; 2026f); ▲$2.936 trillion (PPP; 2026f)
- GDP rank: 14th (nominal; 2026); 15th (PPP; 2026)
- GDP growth: 2.0% (2026f)
- GDP per capita: ▲$41,563 (nominal; 2026f); ▲$58,348 (PPP; 2026f)
- GDP per capita rank: 31st (nominal; 2026); 37th (PPP; 2026)
- GDP per capita growth: 1.8% (real; 2025)
- GDP by sector: Agriculture: 2.7%; Industry: 22.0%; Services: 75.3%; (2023)
- Inflation (CPI): ▼2.0% (2026f); ▲2.5% (2027f); ▼2.0% (2028f)
- Population below national poverty line: ▼25.7% at risk of poverty or social exclusion (AROPE 2025)
- Gini coefficient: ▼30.8 medium (2025)
- Human Development Index: ▲0.918 very high (2023) (28th); ▲0.819 very high IHDI (33rd) (2023)
- Corruption Perceptions Index: ▼55 out of 100 points (2025) (49th)
- Labour force: ▲25,000,300 (2025); ▲59.3% economic activity rate (2025); ▲53.44% employment rate (2026 Q2)
- Labour force by occupation: Agriculture: 3.5%; Industry: 20.4%; Services: 76.1%; (2025)
- Unemployment: ▼9.87% (Q2 2026)
- Youth unemployment: 24.7% (2025)
- Average gross salary: €2,642 / $2,991 per month (2024)
- Average net salary: €2,048 / $2,319 per month (2024)
- Wage growth: 1.9% (real; 2024)
- Main industries: Machinery; electronics; medical equipment; chemicals; motor vehicles; clothing; food processing; tourism; shipbuilding

External
- Exports: ▼$413 billion (2024)
- Export goods: Machinery, motor vehicles; foodstuffs, pharmaceuticals, medicines, other consumer goods
- Main export partners: rest of EU 60.29%; France 14.1%; Germany 10.2%; Portugal 9.28%; Italy 8.63%; Netherlands 3.08%; United Kingdom 6.53%; United States 5.14%; Morocco 3.58%; Turkey 2.35%; China 2.08% (2024)
- Imports: ▼$459 billion (2024)
- Import goods: Fuels, chemicals, semi-finished goods, foodstuffs, consumer goods, machinery and equipment, measuring and medical control instruments
- Main import partners: rest of EU 50.37%; Germany 11.6%; France 9.54%; Italy 7.19%; Netherlands 4.64%; Portugal 4.25%; China 10.1%; United States 6.01%; Morocco 2.87%; United Kingdom 2.37%; Turkey 2.18% (2024)
- FDI stock: ▲ Inward: $43 billion (2023); ▲ Outward: $40 billion (2023)

Public finance
- Government debt: ▼100.4% of GDP (2025); ▲$1.89 trillion (2025)
- Foreign reserves: ▲$107.8 billion (2024 est.)
- Budget balance: ▼€51.1 billion deficit (2025); ▼ −2.7% of GDP (2025)
- Revenue: 42.3% of GDP (2024)
- Spending: 45.4% of GDP (2024)
- Economic aid: €35 billion from European Structural and Investment Funds (2007–2013); €37 billion from European Structural and Investment Funds (2014–2020)
- Credit rating: Standard & Poor's: A+ (Domestic); A+ (Foreign); AAA (T&C Assessment); Outlook: Stable; Moody's: A3; Outlook: Stable; Fitch: A; Outlook: Stable; Scope: A+; Outlook: Stable
- All values, unless otherwise stated, are in US dollars.

Spain has a highly developed social market economy. It is the world's 14th-largest by nominal GDP, the fourth-largest in the EU, and the sixth-largest in Europe. Spain is a member of the European Union and the eurozone, as well as the OECD and the World Trade Organization. In 2024, Spain ranked as both the 17th-largest exporter and the 17th-largest importer in the world. Spain is listed 28th in the UN Human Development Index and 30th in GDP per capita by the IMF. Some main areas of economic activity are the automotive industry, medical technology, chemicals, shipbuilding, tourism and the textile industry. Among OECD members, Spain has a highly efficient and strong social security system, which comprises roughly 23% of GDP.

During the Great Recession, Spain's economy was also in a recession. Compared to the EU and US averages, the Spanish economy entered recession later, but stayed there longer. The boom of the 2000s was reversed, leaving over a quarter of Spain's workforce unemployed by 2012. In aggregate, GDP decreased almost 9% during 2009–2013. In 2012, the government officially requested a credit from the European Stability Mechanism to restructure its banking sector in the face of the crisis. The ESM approved assistance and Spain drew €41 billion. The ESM programme for Spain ended with the full repayment of the credit drawn 18 months later.

Representing approximately 0.6% of the world's population, Spain accounts for about 1.36% of the global gross domestic product (GDP). This indicates that Spain's GDP per capita is significantly higher than the global average. Specifically, Spain's GDP per capita is approximately 2.55 times (or 255%) the world average, reflecting a relatively high level of economic productivity and development. Consequently, Spain maintains a standard of living that surpasses that of many countries with larger populations but lower economic output per capita.

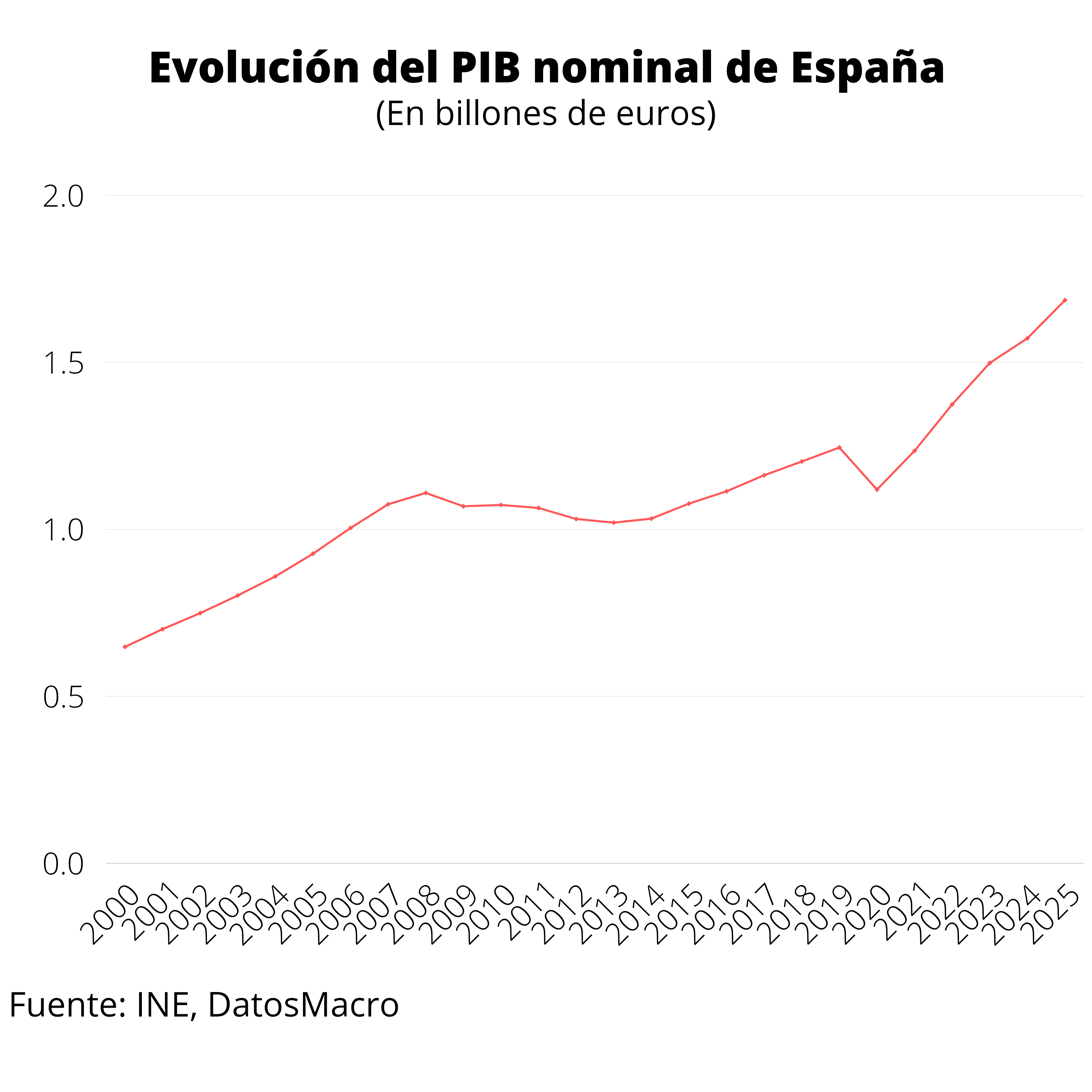
Evolution of Spain's nominal GDP since 2000 (in trillions of euros)

== History ==
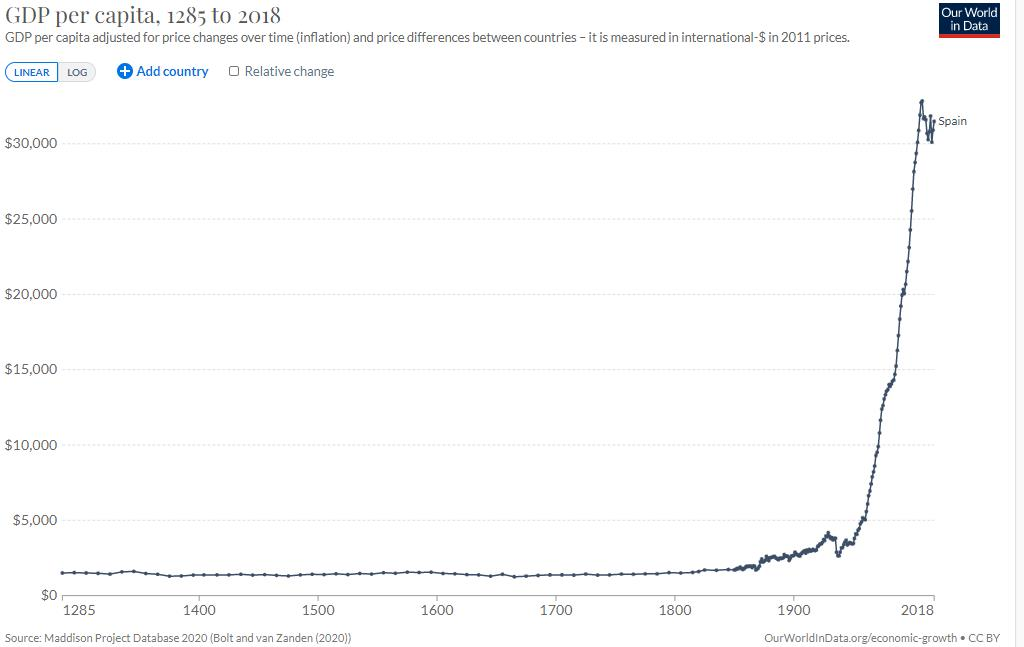
Real GDP per capita development Spain

During the first decades of the twentieth century, Spain experienced an accelerated growth of its industrial labor force and urban population; the economy became less agrarian as the process of urbanization spread after 1910. The largest sector was still agriculture but saw declines, along with fishery, relative to the share of active population engaged in the activity. The fastest growing sector at that time was services.

When Spain joined the EEC in 1986 its GDP per capita was about 72% of the average of its members.

At the second half of the 1990s, the conservative government of former prime minister Jose María Aznar had worked successfully to gain admission to the group of countries joining the euro in 1999. By the mid-1990s the economy had commenced the growth that had been disrupted by the global recession of the early 1990s. The strong economic growth helped the government to reduce the government debt as a percentage of GDP and Spain's high unemployment rate began to steadily decline. With the government budget in balance and inflation under control Spain was admitted into the eurozone in 1999. By 2007, Spain had achieved a GDP per capita of 105% of European Union's average due to its own economic development and the EU enlargements to 28 members, which placed it slightly ahead of Italy (103%). Three regions were included in the leading EU group exceeding 125% of the GDP per capita average level: the Basque Country, Madrid, and Navarre. According to calculations by the German newspaper Die Welt in 2008, Spain's economy had been on course to overtake countries like Germany in per capita income by 2011. in October 2006, Unemployment stood at 7.6% which compared favorably to many other European countries, and especially with the early 1990s when it stood at over 20%. In the past, Spain's economy had included high inflation and it has always had a large underground economy.

The turn to growth during the 1997-2007 period produced a real estate bubble fed by historically low interest rates, massive rates of foreign investment (during that period Spain had become a favorite of other European investment banks) and an immense surge in immigration. At its peak in 2007, construction had expanded to 15% of the total gross domestic product (GDP) of the country and 12% of total employment. During that time Spain capital inflows –including short term speculative investment– financed a large trade deficit.

The downside of the real estate boom was a corresponding rise in the levels of private debt, both of households and of businesses; as prospective homeowners had struggled to meet asking prices, the average level of household debt tripled in less than a decade. This placed especially great pressure upon lower to middle income groups; by 2005 the median ratio of indebtedness to income had grown to 125%, due primarily to expensive boom time mortgages that now often exceed the value of the property.

Noticeable progress continued until early 2008, when the 2008 financial crisis burst Spain's property bubble.

A European Commission forecast had predicted Spain would enter the world's late 2000s recession by the end of 2008. At the time, Spain's Economy Minister was quoted saying, "Spain is facing its deepest recession in half a century". Spain's government forecast the unemployment rate would rise to 16% in 2009. The ESADE business school predicted 20%. By 2017, Spain's GDP per capita had fallen back to 95% of the European Union's average.

=== 2008–2014 Spanish financial crisis ===
Like most economies, Spain's economy had been steadily growing, regardless of political changes e.g. when the ruling party changed in 2004. It maintained robust growth during the first term of prime minister José Luis Rodríguez Zapatero, even though problems were becoming evident. According to the Financial Times, Spain's rapidly growing trade deficit had reached 10% of GDP by summer 2008, the "loss of competitiveness against its main trading partners" and as a part of the latter, inflation which had been traditionally higher than its European competitors. This was especially affected by house price increases of 150% from 1998 and growing private sector indebtedness (115%), chiefly related to the Spanish Real Estate boom and rocketing oil prices.

In April 2008, the Spanish government growth forecast was 2.3%, but this was revised down by the Ministry of Economy to 1.6%. Studies by independent forecasters estimated it had actually dropped to 0.8%, below the strong 3% plus growth rates during 1997–2007. During Q3 of 2008 the GDP contracted for the first time in 15 years. In February 2009, it was confirmed that Spain, along other European economies, had entered recession.

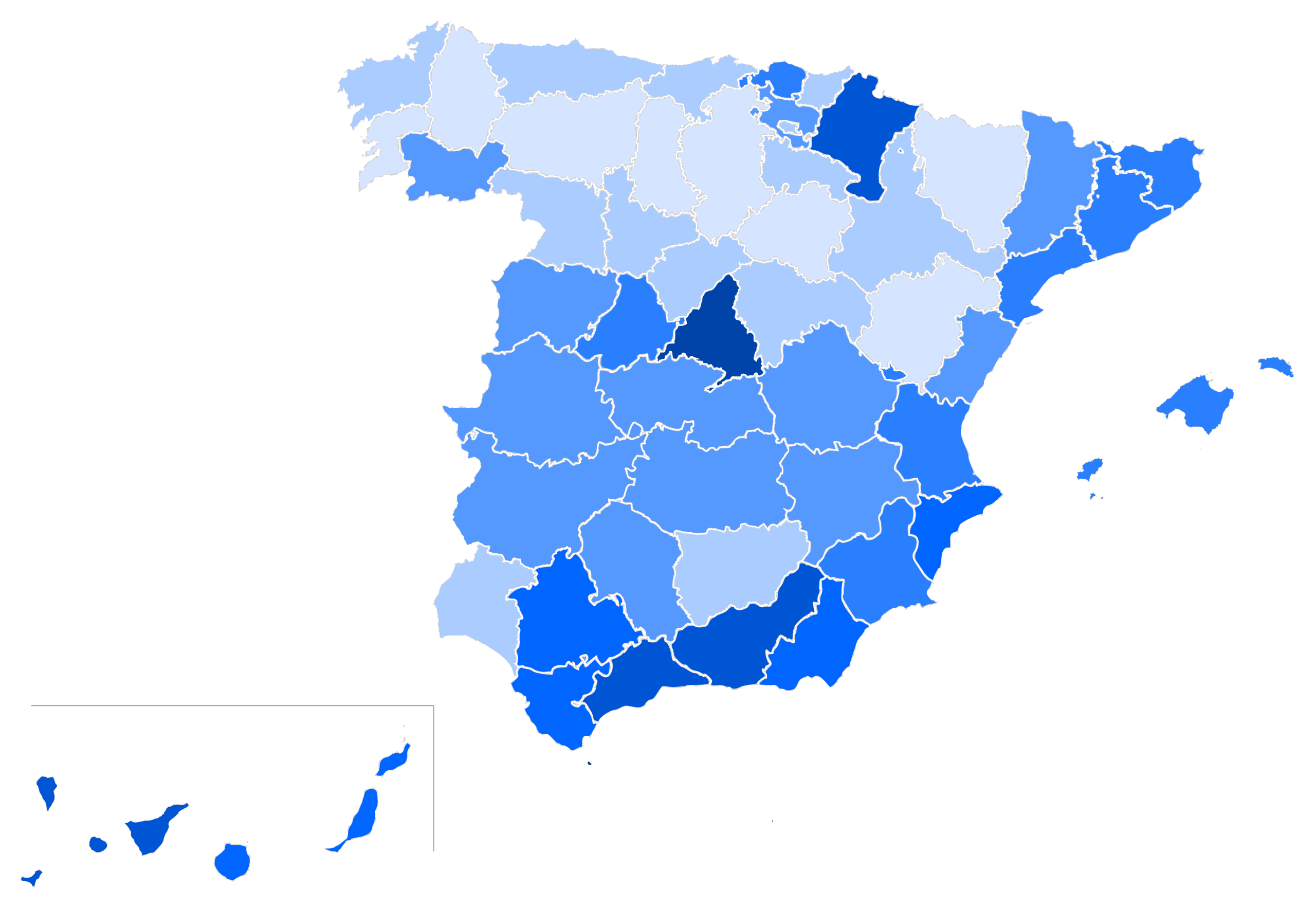
Spanish Provinces by Gini Coefficient, 2021: 28-28.9; 29-29.9; 30-30.9; 31-31.9; 32-32.9; 33-33.9; 34-35.9

In July 2009, the IMF worsened the estimates for Spain's 2009 contraction, to -4% of GDP, close to the European average of -4.6%. It estimated a further 0.8% contraction for Spain, in 2010. In 2011, the deficit reached a high of 8.5%. For 2016 the deficit objective of the government was around 4%, falling to 3% for 2017. The European Commission demanded 4% for 2016 and 2.5% for 2017.

==== Property boom and bust, 2003–2014 ====
The adoption of the euro in 2002 had driven down long-term interest rates, prompting a surge in mortgage lending that jumped fourfold from 2000 to its 2010 apex. The growth in the property market, which had begun in 1997, accelerated and within a few years had developed into a property bubble. It was financed largely by "Cajas", which are regional savings banks under the oversight of regional governments, and was fed by the historically low interest rates and a massive growth of immigration. Fueling this trend, the economy was being credited for having avoided the almost zero of some of its largest partners in the EU, in the months previous to the global Great Recession.

Over the five years ending 2005, Spain's economy had created more than half of all new jobs in the EU. At the top of its property boom, Spain was building more houses than Germany, France and the UK combined. Home prices soared by 71% between 2003 and 2008, in tandem with the credit explosion.

The bubble imploded in 2008, causing the collapse of Spain's large property related and construction sectors, causing mass layoffs, and a collapsing domestic demand for goods and services. Unemployment shot up. At first, Spain's banks and financial services avoided the early crisis of their international counterparts. However, as the recession deepened and property prices slid, the growing bad debts of the smaller regional savings banks, forced the intervention of Spain's central bank and government through a stabilization and consolidation program, taking over or consolidating regional "cajas", and finally receiving a bank bailout from the European Central Bank in 2012, aimed specifically for the banking business and "cajas" in particular. Following the 2008 peak, home prices plunged by 31%, before bottoming out in late 2014.

The economic situation started improving by 2013. By then, Spain managed to reverse the record trade deficit which had built up during the boom years. It attained a trade surplus in 2013, after three decades of running a deficit. In 2015, GDP grew by 3.2%: a rate not seen since 2007. In 2014–2015, the economy recovered 85% of the GDP lost during the 2009–2013 recession. This success led some analysts to refer to Spain's recovery as "the showcase for structural reform efforts". Spain's unemployment fell substantially from 2013 to 2017. Real unemployment is much lower, as millions work in the grey market, people who count as unemployed yet perform jobs. Real Spanish GDP may be around 20% bigger, as it is assumed the underground economy is annually 190 billion euros (US$224 billion). Among high income European countries, only Italy and Greece are believed to have larger underground economies. Thus Spain may have higher purchasing power as well as a smaller gini coefficient (inequality measure), than shown in official numbers.

==== Euro debt crisis, 2010-2012 ====
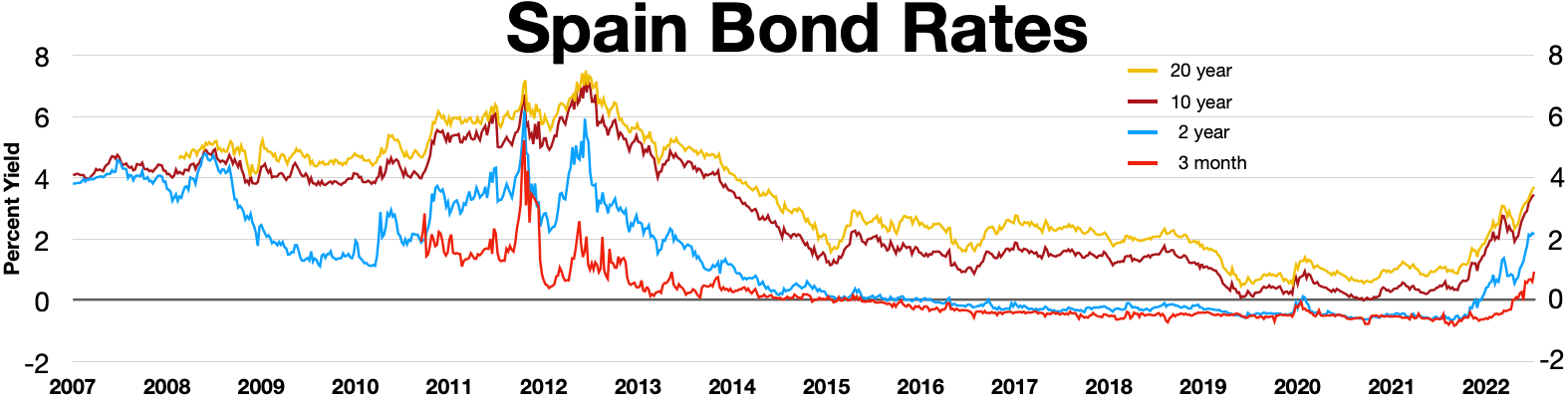
Spain bond rates during the 2008–2014 Spanish financial crisis 20 year bond 10 year bond 2 year bond 3 month bond

Spain is part of a monetary union, the eurozone (dark blue), and the European single market.

In the first weeks of 2010, renewed anxiety about excessive debt in some EU countries and, more generally, about the health of the euro spread from Ireland and Greece to Portugal, and to a lesser extent Spain. Many economists recommended a battery of policies to control the surging public debt caused by the recessionary collapse of tax revenues, combining drastic austerity measures with higher taxes. Some German policymakers went as far as to say that bailouts should include harsh penalties to EU aid recipients, such as Greece. The Spanish government budget was in surplus in the years immediately before the Great Recession, and its debt was not considered excessive.

At the beginning of 2010, Spain's public debt as a percentage of GDP was still less than those of Britain, France or Germany. However, commentators pointed out that Spain's recovery was fragile, that the public debt was growing quickly, troubled regional banks may need large bailouts, growth prospects were poor and therefore limiting revenue, and that the central government had limited control over the spending of the regional governments. Under the structure of shared governmental responsibilities that has evolved since 1975, much responsibility for spending had been given back to the regions. The central government found itself in the position of trying to gain support for unpopular spending cuts from the recalcitrant regional governments. In May 2010, the government announced further austerity measures, consolidating the ambitious plans announced in January.

As of September 2011, Spanish banks held a record high of €142 billion of Spanish national bonds. Till Q2 2012, Spanish banks were allowed to report real estate related assets in higher non-market price by regulators. Investors who bought into such banks must be aware. Spanish houses cannot be sold at land book value after being vacant over a period of years.

==== Employment crisis ====
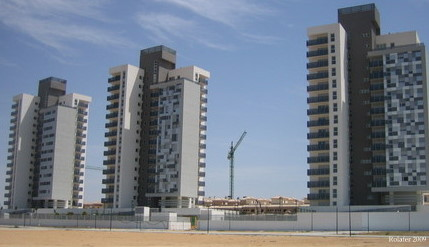
Torres de la Casería de Ossio apartment buildings in San Fernando completed in 2007. The collapse of the Spanish construction boom was a major contributor to the record unemployment.

After having completed large improvements over the second half of the 1990s and during the 2000s, Spain attained in 2007 its record low unemployment rate, at about 8%, with some regions on the brink of full employment. Then Spain suffered a severe setback from October 2008, when it saw its unemployment rate surge. Between October 2007 – October 2008 the surge exceeded that of past economic crises, including 1993. In particular, during October 2008, Spain suffered its worst unemployment rise ever recorded. Even though the sheer size of Spain's underground economy masked the real situation, employment has been a long term weakness of the economy. By 2014 the structural unemployment rate was estimated at 18%. By July 2009, Spain had shed 1.2 million jobs in one year. The oversized building and housing related industries were contributing greatly to the rising unemployment. From 2009 thousands of established immigrants began to leave, although some did maintain residency due to poor conditions in their country of origin. In all, by early 2013 Spain reached an unprecedented unemployment record at about 27%.

In 2012 a radical labor reform made for a more flexible labor market, facilitating layoffs with a view to enhancing business confidence.

===== Youth =====
During the early 1990s, Spain experienced economic crisis as a result of a Europe-wide economic episode that led to a rise in unemployment. Many young adults found themselves trapped in a cycle of temporary jobs, which resulted in the creation of a secondary class of workers through reduced wages, job stability and advancement opportunities. As a result, many Spaniards, predominantly unmarried young adults, emigrated to pursue job opportunities and raise their quality of life, which left only a small amount of young adults living below the poverty line. Spain experienced another economic crisis during the 2000s, which also prompted a rise in emigration to neighboring countries with more job stability and better economic standing.

Youth unemployment remains a concern, prompting suggestions of labor market programs and job-search assistance like matching youth skills with businesses. This would improve Spain's weakened youth labor market, and their school to work transition, as young people have found it difficult to find long-term employment. As of June 2026, the youth unemployment in Spain stands at 23.77%.

===== Employment recovery =====
The labor market reform started a trend of setting successive positive employment records. By Q2 of 2014, the economy had reversed its negative trend and started creating jobs for the first time since 2008. The second quarter reversal had been extraordinary; jobs created set an absolute positive record since such quarterly employment statistics began in 1964. Labor reform did seem to play an important role; one piece of evidence cited was that Spain had started creating jobs at lower rates of GDP growth than before: in previous cycles, employment rose when growth hit 2%, this time the gain came during a year when GDP had expanded by just 1.2%.

Greater than expected GDP growth paved the way for further decline in unemployment. Since 2014, Spain registered steady annual falls in the official jobless figure. During 2016, unemployment experienced the steepest fall on record. By the end of 2016, Spain had recovered 1.7m of the more than 3.5m jobs lost over the recession. By Q4 2016 Spanish unemployment had fallen to 19%, the lowest rate in seven years. In April 2017 the country recorded its biggest drop in jobless claimants for a single month to date. In Q2 of 2017, unemployment fell to 17%, below 4 million for the first time since 2008, with the country experiencing its steepest quarterly decline in unemployment on record. In 2018, at 14.6% the unemployment rate did not exceed the 15% threshold for the first time since 2008 when the crisis began.

As of 2017, trade unions, left, and center-left parties continued to criticize and wanted labor reform to be revoked, on grounds that it tilted the balance of power too far towards employers. Most new contracts were temporary. In 2019, Pedro Sánchez's socialist government increased the minimum wage by 22% in an attempt to boost hiring and encourage spending, and increased it further in the labor reform adopted at the end of 2021. Members of the opposition argued this increase would negatively affect 1.2 million workers due to employers being unable to cover the raise, resulting in higher unemployment. Contrary to such opinion, the reforms approved by Sanchez's government resulted in a robust shift towards permanent employment contracts, and led to a 15-year low in unemployment rates at 11.60%.

The Sánchez administration raised the minimum wage to €1,221 per month in 2026, for a total 66% increase since it took power in 2018. This prompted widespread labor law violations among lower-skilled employment positions. Economists observed that the Spanish minimum wage equaled the country's modal salary, indicating that the higher minimum wages were "disconnected from the economy and the labor market" and had exerted no upward pressure on salaries greater than the minimum. Average gross monthly pay was still 10-15% lower than the rest of Europe. The rise increased pressure on holders of Spain's Digital Nomad Visa, who are required to earn 200% of the minimum wage rate.

==== Reduction of European Union funds ====
Capital contributions from the EU, which had contributed significantly to the economic empowerment of Spain since joining the EEC, have decreased considerably since 1990, due to the effects of the EU's enlargement. Agricultural funds from the Common Agricultural Policy of the European Union (CAP) are now spread across more countries. And, with 2004 and 2007's enlargement of the European Union, less developed countries joined, lowering average income, so that Spanish regions which had been relatively less developed, were now at the European average or even above it. Spain has gradually become a net contributor of funds for less developed countries of the Union, as opposed to receiving funds.

==== Economic recovery (2014–2020) ====
During the economic downturn, Spain significantly reduced imports, increased exports and attracted growing numbers of tourists; as a result, after three decades of running a trade deficit the country attained in 2013 a trade surplus which strengthened during 2014–15.

With a 3.2% increase in 2015, growth was the highest among larger EU economies. In two years (2014–2015) the economy had recovered 85% of the GDP lost during the 2009-2013 recession, which had some international analysts referring to Spain's recovery as "the showcase for structural reform efforts". The Spanish economy outperformed expectations and grew 3.2% in 2016, faster than the eurozone average. One of the main drivers of recovery was international trade, in turn sparked by dramatic gains in labor productivity. Exports shot up, from around 25% (2008) to 33% of GDP (2016) on the back of an internal devaluation (the country's wage bill halved in 2008–2016), a search for new markets, and a mild recovery of the European economy. In the second quarter of 2017 Spain had recovered all the GDP lost during the economic crisis, exceeding for the first time output in 2008.

By 2017, following several months of prices increasing, homeowners who had been renting during the economic slump had started to put their properties back on the market. In this regard, home sales are expected to return in 2017 to pre-crisis (2008) level. The Spanish real estate market was experiencing a new boom, this time in the rental sector. Out of 50 provinces and compared to May 2007, the National Statistics Institute recorded higher rent levels in 48 provinces, with the 10 most populated accumulating rent inflation between 5% and 15% since 2007. The phenomenon was most visible in big cities such as Barcelona or Madrid, which saw new record average prices, partially fueled by short-term rentals to tourists.

In May 2020 Spain introduced the Ingreso Mínimo Vital (IMV) through Real Decreto‑Ley 20/2020 of 29 May, establishing the first nationwide minimum income scheme aimed at preventing poverty and social exclusion among low-income households. The measure was launched against the backdrop of the COVID-19 pandemic but designed as a lasting instrument: the allowance varied depending on household size (ranging from around EUR 462 for a single adult up to EUR 1,015 for a larger family) and was compatible with other regional aids. The IMV represented a significant shift in Spain's social-protection architecture, by creating a central floor of income support at national level for the first time.

The 2020 pandemic hit the Spanish economy with more intensity than other countries, as foreign tourism accounts for 5% of GDP. In the first quarter of 2023, it had fully recovered from the downturn, its GDP reaching pre-pandemic levels. In 2023, Spain's economy grew 2.5%, bucking a downturn in the eurozone as a whole, and is expected to grow at 3.1% in 2024, and 2.5% in 2025.

== Data ==
The following table shows the main economic indicators in 1980–2024 (plus IMF estimates for 2025–2027 in italics). Inflation below 5% is in green.

Year	GDP (in bn. US$ PPP)	GDP per capita (in US$ PPP)	GDP (in bn. US$ nominal)	GDP per capita (in US$ nominal)	GDP growth (real)	Inflation rate (in Percent)	Unemployment (in Percent)	Government debt (in % of GDP)
1980	294.4	7,819.0	230.8	6,128.0	▲1.2%	▲15.6%	11.0%	16.6%
1981	▲321.0	▲8,443.6	▼204.6	▼5,381.9	▼-0.4%	▼14.5%	▲13.8%	▲20.0%
1982	▲345.0	▲9,028.1	▼197.6	▼5,171.5	▲1.2%	▼14.4%	▲15.8%	▲25.1%
1983	▲364.5	▲9,492.1	▼172.9	▼4,501.8	▲1.7%	▼12.2%	▲17.2%	▲30.4%
1984	▲384.0	▲9,962.0	▼172.4	▼4,471.7	▲1.7%	▼11.3%	▲19.9%	▲37.1%
1985	▲405.5	▲10,482.7	▲181.6	▲4,694.8	▲2.4%	▼8.8%	▲21.3%	▲42.1%
1986	▲427.9	▲11,028.9	▲251.3	▲6,477.3	▲3.4%	▲8.8%	▼20.9%	▲43.3%
1987	▲463.5	▲11,919.1	▲318.4	▲8,187.3	▲5.7%	▼5.2%	▼20.2%	▼43.1%
1988	▲505.2	▲12,963.9	▲374.1	▲9,598.7	▲5.3%	▼4.8%	▼19.2%	▼39.6%
1989	▲551.3	▲14,118.3	▲412.6	▲10,566.1	▲5.0%	▲6.8%	▼17.2%	▲41.0%
1990	▲593.9	▲15,183.5	▲535.7	▲13,693.6	▲3.8%	▼6.7%	▼16.2%	▲42.5%
1991	▲629.5	▲16,050.8	▲576.4	▲14,697.5	▲2.5%	▼5.9%	▲16.3%	▲43.1%
1992	▲649.3	▲16,501.7	▲630.1	▲16,013.2	▲0.9%	▲7.1%	▲18.4%	▲45.4%
1993	▲656.0	▲16,619.1	▼529.3	▼13,409.7	▼-1.3%	▼4.6%	▲22.6%	▲56.2%
1994	▲685.7	▲17,323.7	▲531.1	▲13,419.6	▲2.3%	▲4.7%	▲24.1%	▲58.7%
1995	▲728.9	▲18,373.0	▲613.9	▲15,475.6	▲4.1%	4.7%	▼22.9%	▲63.4%
1996	▲760.2	▲19,118.2	▲640.0	▲16,095.8	▲2.4%	▼3.6%	▼22.1%	▲67.5%
1997	▲803.2	▲20,146.4	▼589.4	▼14,782.9	▲3.9%	▼1.9%	▼20.6%	▼66.2%
1998	▲848.5	▲21,209.3	▲618.4	▲15,457.1	▲4.5%	▼1.8%	▼18.6%	▼64.2%
1999	▲901.3	▲22,413.0	▲636.0	▲15,814.2	▲4.7%	▲2.2%	▼15.6%	▼62.5%
2000	▲968.3	▲23,877.4	▼598.6	▼14,761.1	▲5.1%	▲3.5%	▼13.9%	▼57.8%
2001	▲1,029.1	▲25,244.7	▲627.8	▲15,400.9	▲3.9%	▲3.6%	▼10.5%	▼54.1%
2002	▲1,073.7	▲25,919.4	▲708.3	▲17,097.9	▲2.7%	▼3.1%	▲11.5%	▼51.3%
2003	▲1,127.5	▲26,721.1	▲907.3	▲21,501.1	▲3.0%	▼3.0%	▲11.5%	▼47.7%
2004	▲1,193.9	▲27,856.3	▲1,068.6	▲24,932.1	▲3.1%	3.0%	▼11.0%	▼45.4%
2005	▲1,276.4	▲29,232.4	▲1,154.4	▲26,438.0	▲3.7%	▲3.4%	▼9.2%	▼42.4%
2006	▲1,369.7	▲30,877.5	▲1,260.5	▲28,414.1	▲4.1%	▲3.5%	▼8.5%	▼39.1%
2007	▲1,457.4	▲32,218.4	▲1,474.2	▲32,588.6	▲3.6%	▼2.8%	▼8.2%	▼35.8%
2008	▲1,498.6	▲32,589.8	▲1,631.7	▲35,484.4	▲0.9%	▲4.1%	▲11.2%	▲39.7%
2009	▼1,451.3	▼31,300.8	▼1,489.9	▼32,131.4	▼-3.8%	▼-0.3%	▲17.9%	▲53.3%
2010	▲1,471.3	▲31,597.3	▼1,423.3	▼30,566.9	▲0.2%	▲1.8%	▲19.9%	▲60.5%
2011	▲1,489.6	▲31,872.4	▲1,480.5	▲31,676.7	▼-0.8%	▲3.2%	▲21.4%	▲69.9%
2012	▼1,483.6	▼31,724.6	▼1,325.6	▼28,344.8	▼-3.0%	▼2.4%	▲24.8%	▲90.0%
2013	▲1,512.1	▲32,452.7	▲1,355.2	▲29,085.0	▼-1.4%	▼1.4%	▲26.1%	▲100.5%
2014	▲1,558.3	▲33,544.4	▲1,371.6	▲29,524.8	▲1.4%	▼-0.2%	▼24.4%	▲105.1%
2015	▲1,621.5	▲34,938.6	▼1,195.7	▼25,764.2	▲3.8%	▼-0.5%	▼22.1%	▼103.3%
2016	▲1,733.0	▲37,309.9	▲1,232.6	▲26,535.5	▲3.0%	▲-0.2%	▼19.6%	▼102.8%
2017	▲1,843.9	▲39,626.5	▲1,312.1	▲28,196.8	▲3.0%	▲2.0%	▼17.2%	▼101.9%
2018	▲1,931.2	▲41,328.4	▲1,421.6	▲30,423.2	▲2.3%	▼1.7%	▼15.3%	▼100.5%
2019	▲2,006.7	▲42,600.4	▼1,393.2	▼29,576.3	▲2.1%	▼0.7%	▼14.1%	▼98.3%
2020	▼1,811.0	▼38,244.4	▼1,280.4	▼27,039.1	▼-10.8%	▼-0.3%	▲15.5%	▲120.0%
2021	▲1,983.1	▲41,838.2	▲1,426.2	▲30,089.5	▲6.7%	▲3.1%	▼14.0%	▼116.8%
2022	▲2,269.7	▲47,669.6	▼1,418.9	▼29,799.7	▲6.2%	▲8.8%	▼13.0%	▼111.6%
2023	▲2,529.5	▲52,017.9	▲1,620.5	▲33,325.4	▲2.5%	▼3.4%	▼12.1%	▼105.0%
2024	▲2,672.3	▲54,451.0	▲1,722.2	▲35,091.6	▲3.2%	▼2.8%	▼11.3%	▼101.8%
2025	▲2,811.9	▲56,554.8	▲1,799.5	▲36,192.3	▲2.9%	▼2.2%	▼11.1%	▼100.5%
2026	▲2,925.6	▲58,146.8	▲1,886.2	▲37,488.7	▲2.3%	▼1.9%	▼11.0%	▼99.0%
2027	▲3,030.4	▲59,607.1	▲1,961.5	▲38,583.5	▲1.9%	▲2.1%	▼10.9%	▼97.5%

== Sectors ==
The Spanish benchmark stock market index is the IBEX 35, which as of 2016 is led by banking (including Banco Santander and BBVA), clothing (Inditex), telecommunications (Telefónica) and energy (Iberdrola).

In 2022, the sector with the highest number of companies registered in Spain is Finance, Insurance, and Real Estate with 2,656,178 companies followed by Services and Retail Trade with 2,090,320 and 549,395 companies respectively.

=== Tourism ===
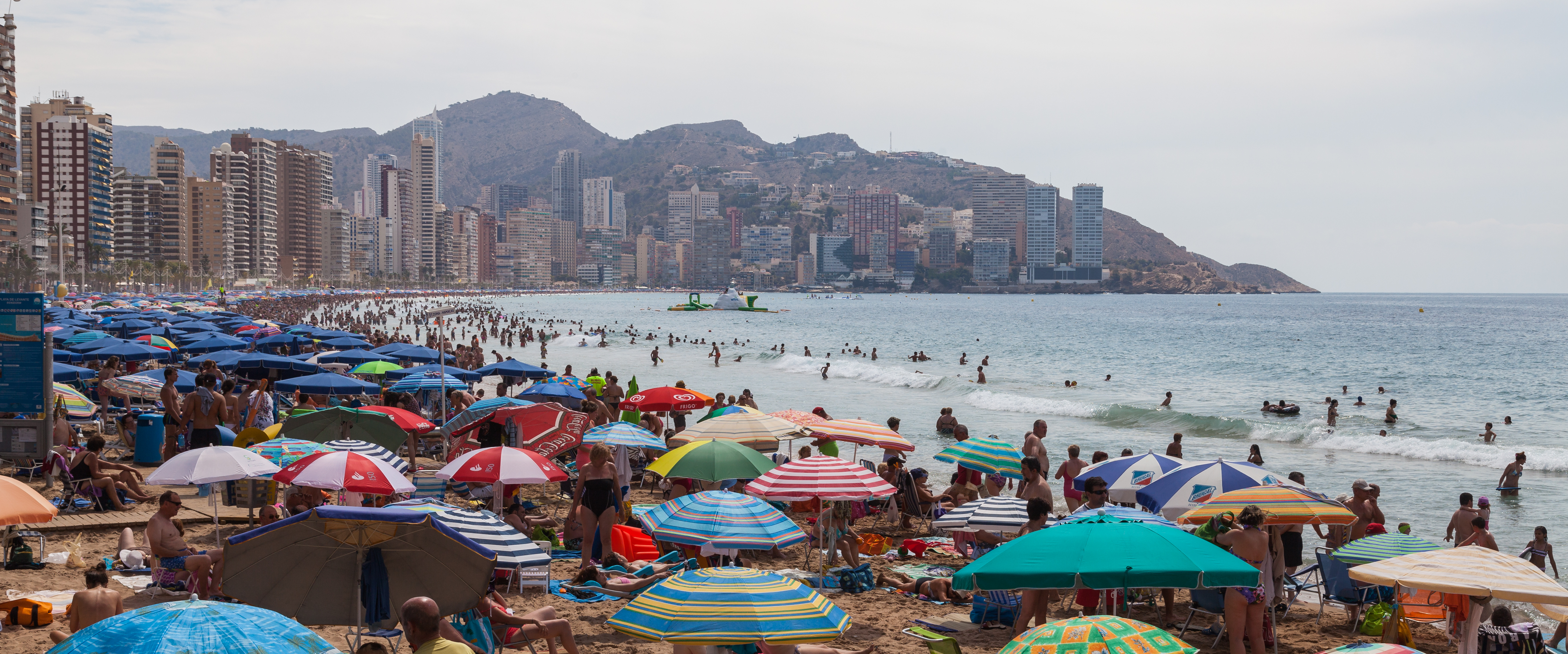
Beach swarmed by tourists, Benidorm

During the last four decades Spain's foreign tourist industry has grown into the second-biggest in the world. A 2015 survey by the World Economic Forum proclaimed the country's tourism industry as the world's most competitive. The 2017 survey repeated this finding.

By 2018 the country was the second most visited country in the world, overtaking the US and not far behind France. With 83.7 million visitors, the country broke in 2019 its own tourism record for the tenth year in a row.

The size of the business has gone from approximately €40 billion in 2006 to about €77 billion in 2016. In 2015 the total value of foreign and domestic tourism came to nearly 5% of the country's GDP and provided employment for about 2 million people.

The headquarters of the World Tourism Organization are located in Madrid.

=== Automotive industry ===
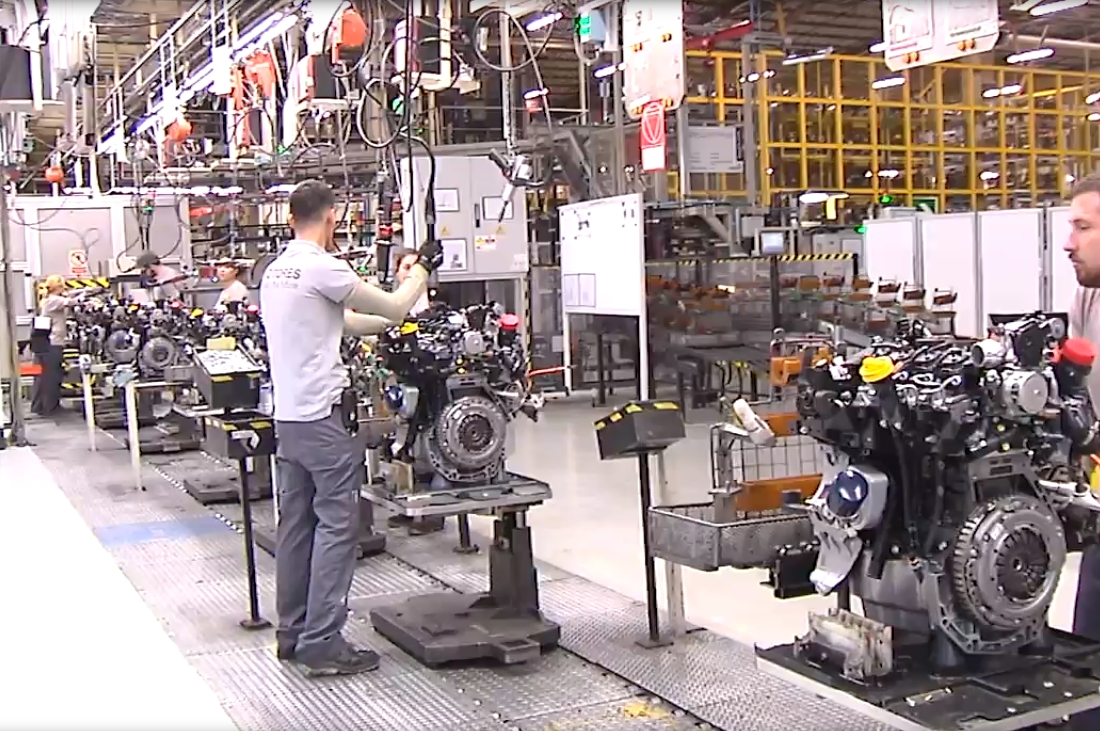
Automotive manufacturing in Valladolid

The automotive industry is one of the largest employers in the country. In 2015 Spain was the 8th largest automobile producer country in the world and the 2nd largest car manufacturer in Europe after Germany.

By 2016, the automotive industry was generating 8.7 percent of Spain's gross domestic product, employing about nine percent of the manufacturing industry. By 2008 the automobile industry was the 2nd most exported industry while in 2015 about 80% of the total production was for export.

German companies poured €4.8 billion into Spain in 2015, making the country the second-largest destination for German foreign direct investment behind only the U.S. The lion's share of that investment —€4 billion— went to the country's auto industry.

=== Energy ===
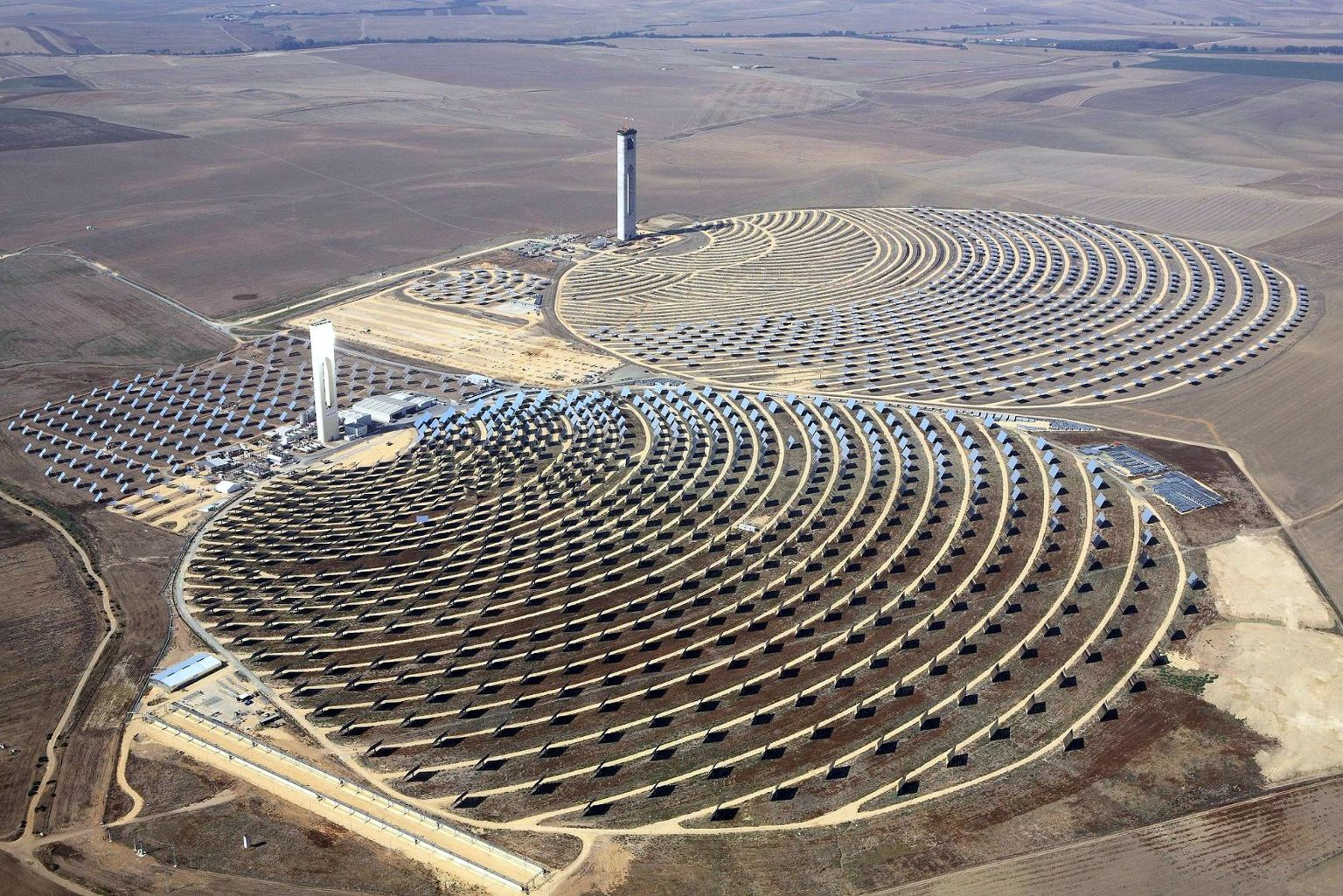
PS10 solar power plant and PS20 solar power plant in Seville

Spanish electricity usage in 2010 constituted 88% of the EU15 average (EU15: 7,409 kWh/person), and 73% of the OECD average (8,991 kWh/person).

In 2023, Spain consumed 244,686 gigawatt hours (GWh) of electricity, a 2.3% decline from 2022.

Spain is one of the world leaders in renewable energies, both as a producer of renewable energy itself and as an exporter of such technology. In 2013 it became the first country ever in the world to have wind power as its main source of energy.

=== Agribusiness and fishing ===
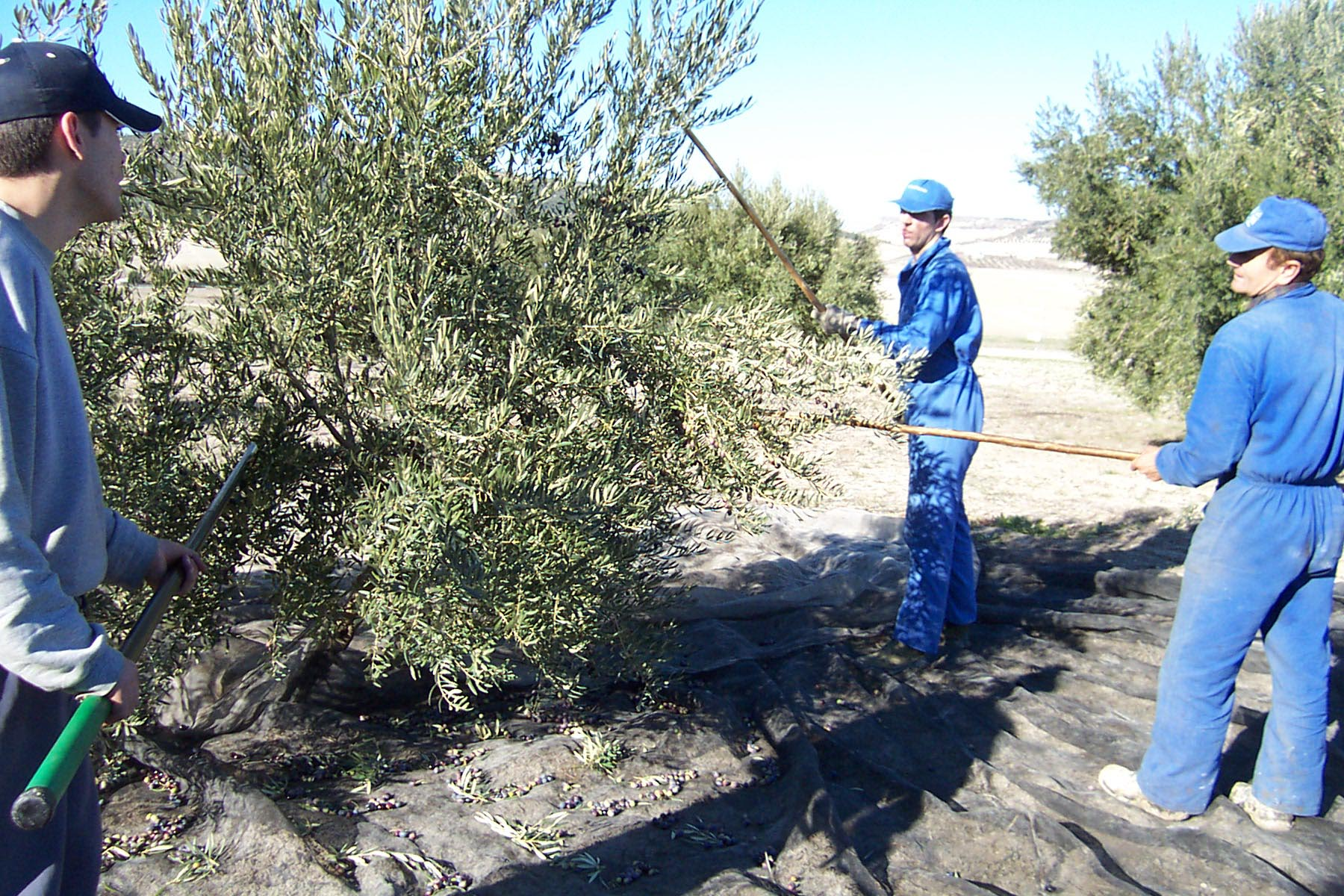
Olive harvest in Jaén

Agribusiness has been another segment growing aggressively over the last few years. At slightly over 40 billion euros, in 2015 agribusiness exports accounted for 3% of GDP and over 15% of the total Spanish exports.

The boom was shaped during the 2004-2014 period, when Spain's agribusiness exports grew by 95% led by pork, wine and olive oil. By 2012 Spain was by far the biggest producer of olive oil in the world, accounting for 50% of the total production worldwide. By 2013 the country became the world's leading producer of wine; in 2014 and 2015 Spain was the world's biggest wine exporter. However, poor marketing and low margins remain an issue, as shown by the fact that the main importers of Spanish olive oil and wine (Italy and France, respectively) buy bulk Spanish produce which is then bottled and sold under Italian or French labels, often for a significant markup.

Spain is the largest producer and exporter in the EU of citrus fruit (oranges, lemons and small citrus fruits), peaches and apricots. It is also the largest producer and exporter of strawberries in the EU.

=== Retail ===
In 2020, the food distribution sector was dominated by Mercadona (24.5% market share), followed by Carrefour (8.4%), Lidl (6.1%), DIA (5.8), Eroski (4.8), Auchan (3.4%), regional distributors (14.3%) and other (32.7%).

=== Mining ===
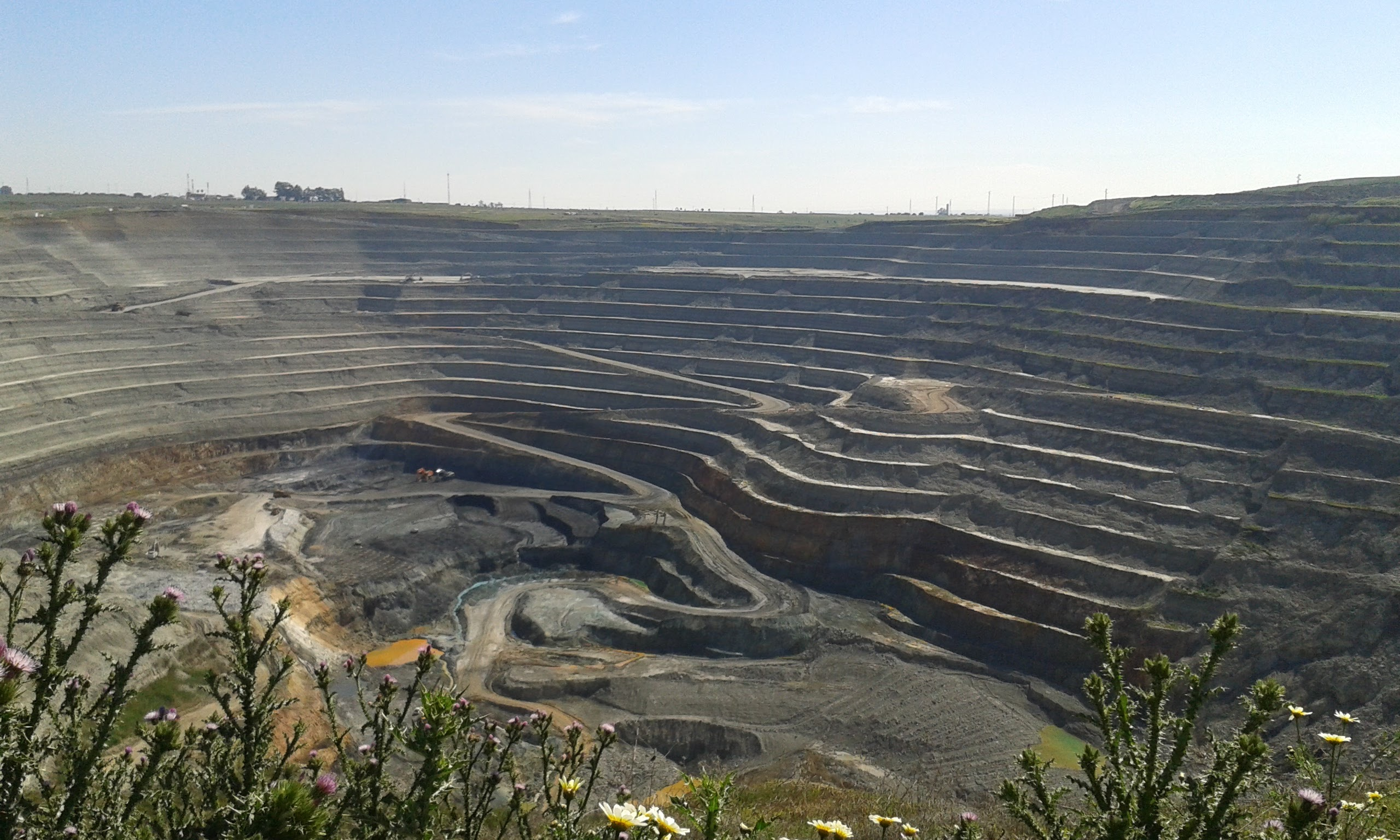
Las Cruces copper mine in Gerena

In 2019, the country was the 7th largest producer of gypsum and the 10th world's largest producer of potash, in addition to being the 15th largest world producer of salt.

Copper (of which the country is the second producer in Europe) is primarily extracted in the Iberian Pyrite Belt.

The province of Granada features two mines of Celestine, making the country a major producer of strontium concentrates.

== Banking system ==
Spanish private commercial banks played a central role in Spain's economic development, benefiting from their role as the state's creditor in the 19th century, from their ability to monetize public debt, and from state-sanctioned oligopolistic arrangements that lasted from the beginning of the 20th century until the late 1980s, when European rules forced a liberalization of the sector. It has been argued that the favorable treatment received by the main Spanish commercial banks and their close relationship to the Bank of Spain (Banco de España) following the end of the Franco regime allowed for a public-private partnership to restructure the large commercial banks into two large banks (Santander and BBVA) with the purpose of preparing the private institutions for international competition and external expansion once the European banking market was integrated in 1992 Alongside this financial mercantilism benefiting the commercial banking sector, Spanish regulators also allowed for the vast expansion of not for profit savings banks sponsored by regional governments who became heavily exposed to the housing mortgage and real estate development sectors during the Spanish economic boom of 1999–2007.

Prior to 2010, the Spanish banking system had been credited as one of the most solid of all western banking systems in coping with the ongoing worldwide liquidity crisis, thanks to the country's conservative banking rules and practices. Banks were required to have high capital provisions and to demand various guarantees and securities from intending borrowers. This allowed the banks, particularly the geographically and industrially diversified large banks like BBVA and Santander, to weather the real estate deflation better than expected. Indeed, Spain's large commercial banks have been able to capitalize on their strong position to buy up distressed banking assets elsewhere in Europe and in the United States.

Nevertheless, with the unprecedented crisis of the country's real estate sector, smaller local savings banks ("Cajas"), had been delaying the registering of bad loans, especially those backed by houses and land, to avoid declaring losses. In June 2009 the Spanish government set its banking bailout and reconstruction fund, the Fondo de reestructuración ordenada bancaria (FROB), known in English as Fund for Orderly Bank Restructuring. In the event, State intervention of local savings banks due to default risk was less than feared. On 22 May 2010, the Banco de España took over "CajaSur", as part of a national program to put the country's smaller banks on a firm financial basis. In December 2011, the Spanish central bank, Banco de España (equivalent of the US Federal Reserve), forcibly took over "Caja Mediterraneo", also known as CAM, (a regional savings bank) to prevent its financial collapse. The international accounting firm, PricewaterhouseCoopers, estimated an imbalance between CAM's assets and debts of €3,500 million, not counting the industrial corporation. The troubled situation reached its peak with the partial nationalization of Bankia in May 2012. By then it was becoming clear that the mounting real estate losses of the savings banks were undermining confidence in the country's government bonds, thus aggravating a sovereign debt crisis.

In early June 2012, Spain requested European funding of €41 billion "to recapitalize Spanish banks that need it". It was not a sovereign bailout in that the funds were used only for the restructuring of the banking sector a full-fledged bailout for an economy the size of the Spanish would have reached ten or twelve times that amount). In return for the credit line extended by the EMS, there were no tax or macroeconomic conditions.

As of 2017 the cost of restructuring Spain's bankrupt savings banks was estimated to be €60.7 billion, of which nearly €41.8 billion was put up by the state through the FROB and the rest by the banking sector. The total cost will not be fully understood until those lenders still controlled by the State (Bankia and BMN) are newly privatized. In this regard, by early 2017 the Spanish government was considering a merger of both banks before privatizing the combined bank to recoup an estimated 400 million euros of their bailout costs. During the course of this transformation, most regional savings banks such as the CAM, Catalunya Banc, Banco de Valencia, Novagalicia Banco, Unnim Banc or Cajasur have since been absorbed by the bigger, more international, Spanish banks, which imposed better management practices.

As of 2022, Spanish banks have halved their number of branches to about 20,000 in the decade since the 2008–2014 Spanish financial crisis and the subsequent international bailout in 2012. The remaining banks have reduced retail opening hours and pushed online banking. A retired urologist with Parkinson's disease gathered more than 600,000 signatures in an online petition "I'm Old, Not an Idiot" asking banks and other institutions to serve all citizens, and not discriminate against the oldest and most vulnerable members.

== Economic strengths ==
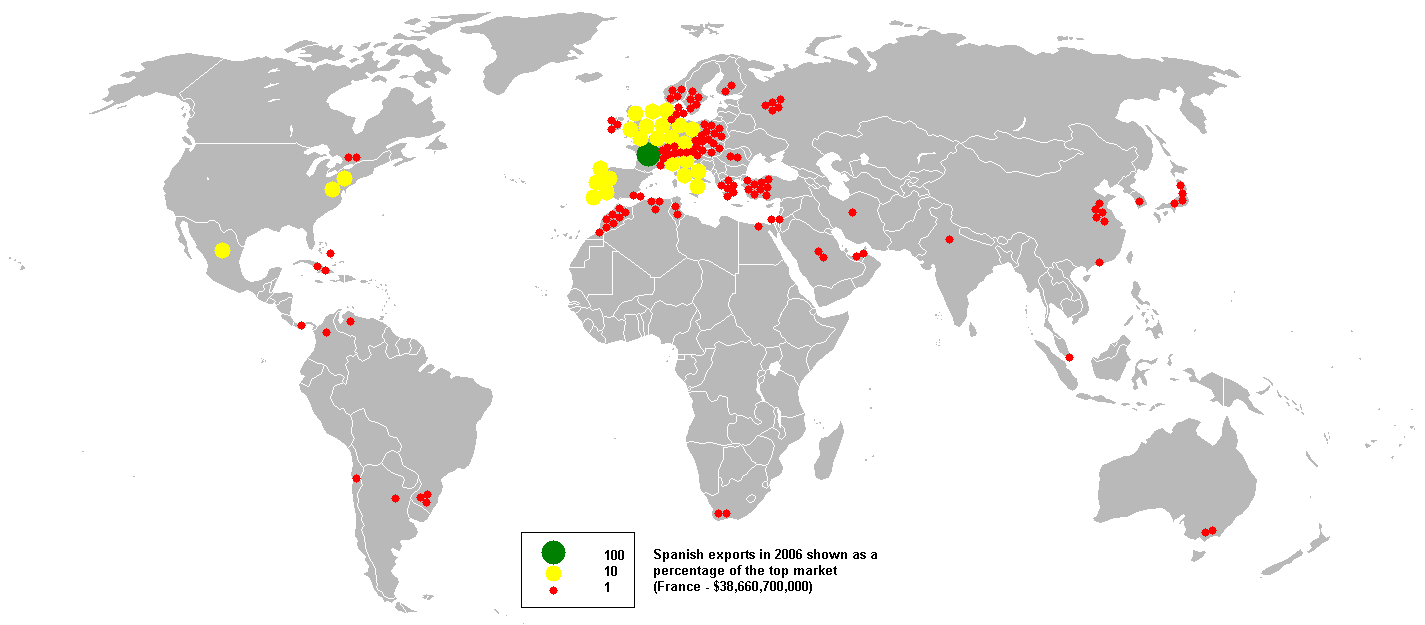
A map of Spanish export destinations in 2006

Since the 1990s some Spanish companies have gained multinational status, often expanding their activities in culturally close Latin America, Eastern Europe and Asia. Spain is the second biggest foreign investor in Latin America, after the United States. Spanish companies have also expanded into Asia, especially China and India. This early global expansion gave Spanish companies a competitive advantage over some of Spain's competitors and European neighbors. Another contribution to the success of Spanish firms may have to do with booming interest toward Spanish language and culture in Asia and Africa, but also a corporate culture that learned to take risks in unstable markets.

Spanish companies invested in fields like biotechnology and pharmaceuticals, or renewable energy (Iberdrola is the world's largest renewable energy operator), technology companies like Movistar (Telefónica), Abengoa, Mondragon Corporation, Gamesa, Hisdesat, Indra, train manufacturers like CAF and Talgo, global corporations such as the textile company Inditex, petroleum companies like Repsol and infrastructure firms. Six of the ten biggest international construction firms specialising in transport are Spanish, including Ferrovial, Acciona, ACS, OHL and FCC.

Spain is equipped with two global systemically important banks, Banco Santander and BBVA.

=== Infrastructure ===
In the 2012–13 edition of the Global Competitiveness Report Spain was listed 10th in the world in terms of first-class infrastructure. It is the 5th EU country with best infrastructure and ahead of countries like Japan or the United States. In particular, the country is a leader in the field of high-speed rail, having developed the second longest network in the world (only behind China) and leading high-speed projects with Spanish technology around the world.

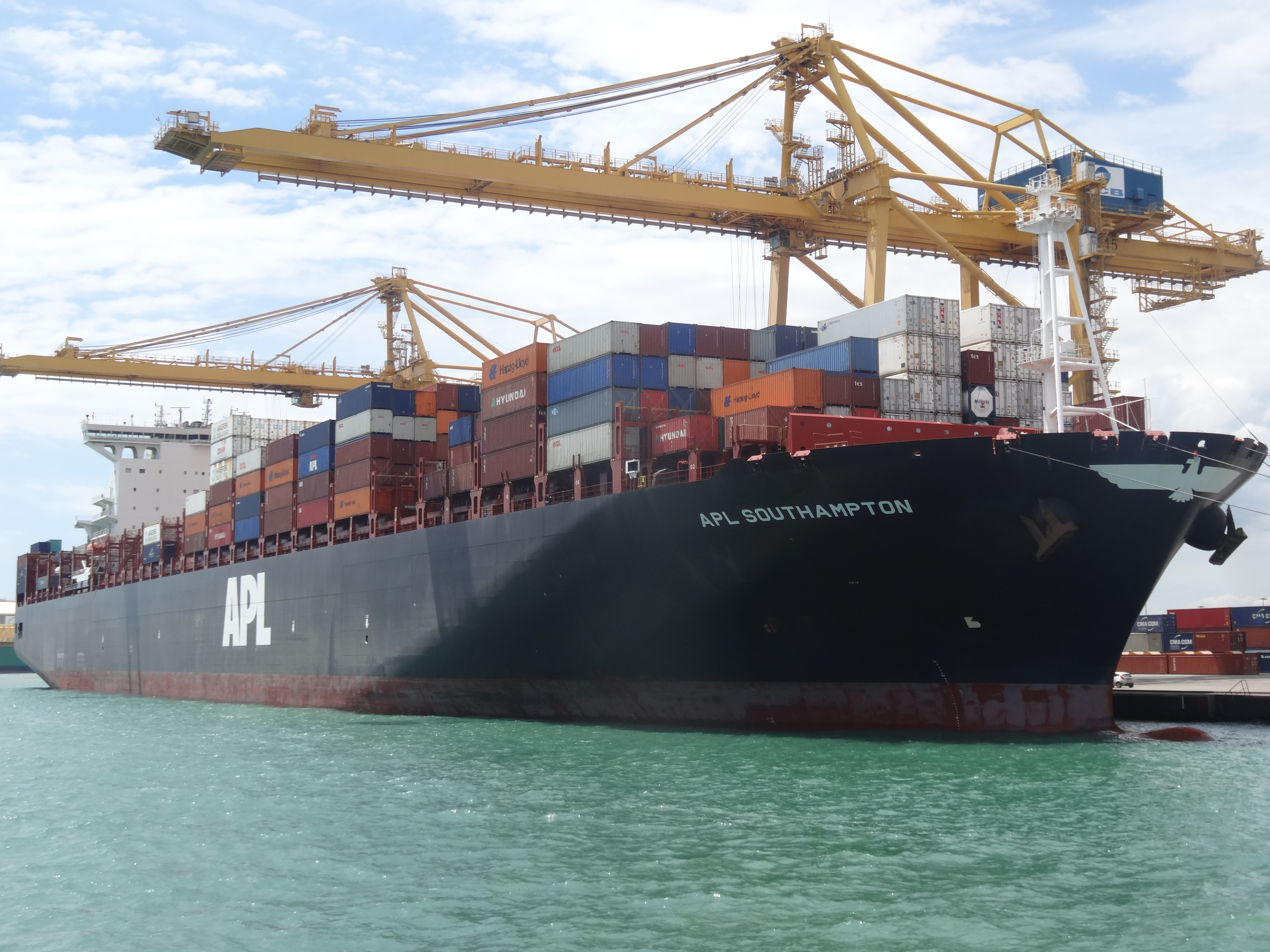
Container ship in the port of Barcelona

The Spanish infrastructure concession companies, lead 262 transport infrastructure worldwide, representing 36% of the total, according to the latest rankings compiled by the publication Public Works Financing. The top three global occupy Spanish companies: ACS, Global Vía and Abertis, according to the ranking of companies by number of concessions for roads, railways, airports and ports in construction or operation in October 2012. Considering the investment, the first world infrastructure concessionaire is Ferrovial-Cintra, with 72,000 million euros, followed closely by ACS, with 70,200 million. Among the top ten in the world are also the Spanish Sacyr (21,500 million), FCC and Global Vía (with 19,400 million) and OHL (17,870 million).

During 2013 Spanish civil engineering companies signed contracts around the world for a total of 40 billion euros, setting a new record for the national industry.

The port of Valencia in Spain is the busiest seaport in the Mediterranean basin, 5th busiest in Europe and 30th busiest in the world. There are four other Spanish ports in the ranking of the top 125 busiest world seaports (Algeciras, Barcelona, Las Palmas, and Bilbao); as a result, Spain is tied with Japan in the third position of countries leading this ranking.

== Trade and investments ==
Exports of Spain by product category (2019) Chemical products Transportation Machines Mineral products Plastics and rubbers Metals Foodstuffs Precious metals Textiles Instruments Animal products Vegetable products Paper goods Footwear and headwear Miscellaneous Stone and glass Wood products Animal and vegetable bi-products Animal hides Arts and antiques Weapons

Traditionally until 2008, most exports and imports from Spain were held with the countries of the European Union: France, Germany, Italy, UK and Portugal.

In recent years foreign trade has taken refuge outside the European Union. Spain's main customers are Latin America, Asia (Japan, China, India), Africa (Morocco, Algeria, Egypt) and the United States. Principal trading partners in Asia are Japan, China, South Korea, Taiwan. In Africa, countries producing oil (Nigeria, Algeria, Libya) are important partners, as well as Morocco. Latin American countries are very important trading partners, like Argentina, Mexico, Cuba (tourism), Colombia, Brazil, Chile (food products) and Mexico, Venezuela and Argentina (petroleum).

After the crisis that began in 2008 and the fall of the domestic market, Spain (since 2010) has turned outwards widely increasing the export supply and export amounts. It has diversified its traditional destinations and has grown significantly in product sales of medium and high technology, including highly competitive markets like the US and Asia.

Top trading partners for Spain in 2015

Imports into Spain 2015
Ranking	Country	Value (USD)	%
	World	$305,266MM	100.0%
1	Germany	$39,854MM	13.1%
2	France	$33,031MM	10.8%
3	China	$26,474MM	8.7%
4	Italy	$19,241MM	6.3%
5	United States	$14,247MM	4.7%
6	United Kingdom	$13,966MM	4.6%
7	Netherlands	$12,706MM	4.2%
8	Portugal	$11,901MM	3.9%
9	Belgium	$7,849MM	2.6%
10	Algeria	$7,198MM	2.4%

Exports from Spain for 2015
Ranking	Country	Value (USD)	%
	World	$278,122MM	100.0%
1	France	$42,998MM	15.5%
2	Germany	$30,077MM	10.8%
3	Italy	$20,758MM	7.5%
4	United Kingdom	$20,258MM	7.3%
5	Portugal	$19,914MM	7.2%
6	United States	$12,668MM	4.6%
7	Netherlands	$8,820MM	3.2%
8	Belgium	$7,384MM	2.7%
9	Morocco	$6,811MM	2.5%
10	Turkey	$5,650MM	2.0%

During the boom years, Spain had built up a trade deficit eventually amounting a record equivalent to 10% of GDP (2007) and the external debt ballooned to the equivalent of 170% of GDP, one of the highest among Western economies. Then, during the economic downturn, Spain reduced significantly imports due to domestic consumption shrinking while – despite the global slowdown – it has been increasing exports and kept attracting growing numbers of tourists. Spanish exports grew by 4.2% in 2013, the highest rate in the European Union. As a result, after three decades of running a trade deficit Spain attained in 2013 a trade surplus. Export growth was driven by capital goods and the automotive sector and the forecast was to reach a surplus equivalent to 2.5% of GDP in 2014. Exports in 2014 were 34% of GDP, up from 24% in 2009. The trade surplus attained in 2013 has been consolidated in 2014 and 2015.

Despite slightly declining exports from fellow EU countries in the same period, Spanish exports continued to grow and in the first half of 2016 the country beat its own record to date exporting goods for 128,041 million euros; from the total, almost 67% were exported to other EU countries. During this same period, from the 70 members of the World Trade Organization (whose combined economies amount to 90% of global GDP), Spain was the country whose exports had grown the most.

In 2016, exports of goods hit historical highs despite a global slowdown in trade, making up for 33% of the total GDP (by comparison, exports represent 12% of GDP in the United States, 18% in Japan, 22% in China or 45% in Germany).

In all, by 2017 foreign sales have been rising every year since 2010, with a degree of unplanned import substitution -a rather unusual feat for Spain when in an expansive phase- which points to structural competitive gains. According to the most recent 2017 data, about 65% of the country's exports go to other EU members.

== Government policies ==
Due to the lack of its own resources, Spain has to import all of its fossil fuels. Besides, until the 2008 crisis, Spain's recent performance had shown an inflationary tendency and an inflationary gap compared to other EMU countries, affecting the country's overall productivity. Moreover, when Spain joined the eurozone, it lost the recourse of resorting to competitive devaluations, risking a permanent and cumulative loss of competitive due to inflation. In a scenario of record oil prices by the mid-2000s this meant much added pressure to the inflation rate. In June 2008 the inflation rate reached a 13-year high at 5.00%.

Then, with the dramatic decrease of oil prices in the second half of 2008 plus the manifest bursting of the real estate bubble, concerns quickly shifted over to the risk of deflation, as Spain recorded in January 2009 its lowest inflation rate in 40 years, followed shortly afterwards, in March 2009 by a negative inflation rate for the first time since the gathering of these statistics started. During the 2009−early 2016 period, apart from temporary minor oil shocks, the Spanish economy has generally oscillated between slightly negative to near-zero inflation rates. Analysts reckoned that this was not synonymous with deflation, due to the fact that GDP had been growing since 2014, domestic consumption had rebounded as well and, especially, because core inflation remained slightly positive.

In 2017, moderate inflation between 1-2%, still below the ECB's target, returned as the impact of cheaper fuel prices faded and economic recovery took hold.

The global hike in prices in 2022 was less severe in Spain than it was for its peers, ending the year with the lowest inflation rate in the eurozone, at 5.5%. Prices continued to evolve moderately in 2023, with a lower-than-expected rate of 3.2% year-on-year announced on May 30.

== Mergers and acquisitions ==
Between 1985 and 2018 around 23,201 deals have been announced where Spanish companies participated either as the acquirer or the target. These deals cumulate to an overall value of 1,935 bil. USD (1,571.8 bil. EUR). Here is a list of the top 10 deals with Spanish participation:

Date announced	Acquiror name	Acquiror mid-industry	Acquiror nation	Target name	Target mid-industry	Target nation	Value of transaction ($mil)
10/31/2005	Telefónica SA	Telecommunications Services	Spain	O2 PLC	Wireless	United Kingdom	31,659.40
04/02/2007	Investor Group	Other Financials	Italy	Endesa SA	Power	Spain	26,437.77
05/09/2012	FROB	Other Financials	Spain	Banco Financiero y de Ahorros	Banks	Spain	23,785.68
11/28/2006	Iberdrola SA	Power	Spain	Scottish Power PLC	Power	United Kingdom	22,210.00
02/08/2006	Airport Dvlp & Invest Ltd	Other Financials	Spain	BAA PLC	Transportation & Infrastructure	United Kingdom	21,810.57
03/14/2007	Imperial Tobacco Overseas Hldg	Other Financials	United Kingdom	Altadis SA	Tobacco	Spain	17,872.72
07/23/2004	Santander Central Hispano SA	Banks	Spain	Abbey National PLC	Banks	United Kingdom	15,787.49
07/17/2000	Vodafone AirTouch PLC	Wireless	United Kingdom	Airtel SA	Other Telecom	Spain	14,364.85
12/26/2012	Banco Financiero y de Ahorros	Banks	Spain	Bankia SA	Banks	Spain	14,155.31
04/02/2007	Enel SpA	Power	Italy	Endesa SA	Power	Spain	13,469.98

== See also ==
- List of largest Spanish companies
- List of companies of Spain
- List of trade unions in Spain
- Unemployment in Spain
- Spanish Miracle
- Economic history of Spain
- Asian immigrants and the economy of Spain
