= Hospital Militar de San Carlos =

Coordinates: 36°28′47″N 6°11′42″W

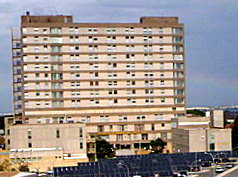

Geography
- Location: San Fernando in the Province of Cádiz, Andalusia, Spain

Organisation
- Type: General

History
- Opened: 1809

Links
- Lists: Hospitals in Spain

Hospital Militar de San Carlos is a hospital located in San Fernando in the Province of Cádiz, Andalusia, Spain. Construction of the original hospital building took place by the Franciscans in February 1809, during the war of independence, but the current building was completed in 1981. Located next to the Panteón de Marinos Ilustres, it was the tallest building in San Fernando until the Torres de la Casería de Ossio surpassed it by several metres.
