= Asian immigrants and the economy of Spain =

Chinese immigrants form the sixth largest immigrant group in Spain, after Romanian immigrants, Moroccan immigrants, Ecuadorian immigrants, British immigrants, and Colombian immigrants. They have enjoyed a significant degree of economic success that has also given them a level of economic power and influence that has not gone by unnoticed by the other Spanish. Undeterred by the 2008 financial crisis, the economic success of Chinese immigrants had created a perception of East Asian immigrants that has been both positive and negative. While a certain level of respect and acknowledgement of the Chinese had been created, their rising success in the midst of hardships on the part of most Spaniards had also bred skepticism and a rejection of the immigrants to a certain extent, especially during the crisis.

== Chinos ==
The traditional and most widespread way that most Asian immigrants in Spain earn their livelihoods is from owning small businesses, such as restaurants and small street stores. Even though the East Asian population in Spain didn't grow significantly until the 21st century, Chinese immigrants actually began to come to Spain in the 1980s, and took up the business of opening up restaurants. Soon, Chinese restaurants were present in all of the neighborhoods in Spain, and Chinese food became increasingly more known and consumed. According to Joaquín Beltrán, a professor of East Asian Studies at the Universidad Autónoma de Barcelona, the Chinese “restaurant was the icon of the Chinese presence in Spain.” Moreover, Chinese food from these restaurants became integrated into the Spanish life as well—“they changed some habits of consumption: the Spanish families found in the spring roll and in rice…a formula of cheap food.” There were only so many restaurants they could open up, however, so the immigrants that arrived later began to open up small stores instead. According to a blog post written by CJ Le, these small shops had quickly become the prevalent form of business that Chinese immigrants ran, because of the indisputable demand for these types of stores on the part of the Spanish. The Spanish “want, and therefore, buy cheap plastic objects, and we like going to a huge shop where we can find everything we need under one roof for an affordable price,” which created a sector in the Spanish market in which the immigrants could relatively easily join in and earn their living without having to take too much of a financial risk. It was—and is—a way in which immigrants can earn a living to get themselves settled and provide for their families. These stores—small corner shops—sell a wide assortment of goods, ranging anywhere from “school supplies, toys, games, electronics, kitchen stuff, shoes, purses, picture frames, fabric, yarn, lightbulbs, glue, hair ties, umbrellas, maps, etc,” all at very reasonable prices. They are often compared to “dollar stores” that exist in the United States, less so because everything's a dollar, or a euro—it's not—but more so because they sell all types of items in one place. In fact, according to a blog writer for the blog, “Get Behind the Muse”:

[Chinese immigrants] don’t seem to lavish a whole pile of investment on outward appearances. Thus, their corner shops are not pretty. There’s no clean-edged shelving with recessed LED lighting, bells ‘n’ whistles displays of the latest products, or space-age refrigerated cabinets that look like something Michael Jackson might have used to attempt to defy the aging process. Inside the Chinese corner shop things are pretty basic. Rough and ready—worse than that, things are old and tacky and somewhat ramshackle.

Besides this type of a store with a random, but abundant, assortment of goods, there are also a significant number of small shops that focus on food—mainly snacks—and drinks; they are very much like what people in the United States call convenience stores. In Spain, however, these types of corner shops are often colloquially called “chinos.” Technically speaking, “chino” is the Spanish word for Chinese, which includes the Chinese language, people from China/of Chinese descent, and things that relate to China. These shops were nicknamed “chinos,” because more often than not, they belonged to Chinese owners. And because many of the owners of these stores were Chinese, these stores were nicknamed “chinos.” Nowadays, however, they're not just exclusively owned by Chinese immigrants; they're typically owned by people of Asian heritage, yes, but not all of the Asian owners of these shops are Chinese. Nevertheless, not only are the stores still very commonly referred to as “chinos,” its owners, too, are often generalized and stereotyped as Chinese.

Additionally, besides having the reputation of having all kinds of items all in one place, as well as being owned by Chinese immigrants, these corner shops also have the reputation of being open all the time, even when the other Spanish stores are closed. During the weekdays, their hours are longer—they open earlier and they close later—and are open on Sundays, when many other Spanish stores are closed. They always seem to be open when you need it to be open, which has significantly contributed not only to the standard characteristics of these stores, but, more importantly, also to the success of many of the immigrants who own these stores, because people can come buy whatever good they need during hours when all of the other stores are closed.

=== Personal anecdotes ===
Although many details vary among the different stories of various immigrants that had been presented in the media, a common characteristic of these stories all seem to be the long hours that they worked in their restaurants or their stores to earn enough money to provide for themselves and their families. For example, the article, “How Spain’s Chinese Immigrants Went from Dishwashers to Doctors” in the newspaper, El País, reveals the story of Jiajia Wang's father. Her father had come here in 1997 using a fake passport, needing to escape China because they had violated China's one-child policy. Jiajia mentions the exhausting long days that her parents endured to earn enough money, and that her family owned a Chinese restaurant in Girona. Hong Guang Yugao, too, is a Chinese immigrant who El País describes in another article, “The Chinese Power in Spain,” as the perfect example of a Chinese immigrant in Spain. He worked more than 12 hours a day and only had a few days off during the month, while taking early morning Spanish classes every day. Through this, he was able to earn enough money to eventually open up two restaurants of his own. Similarly, in an interview with a Chinese owner of a convenience store, he mentions that he works 12–13 hours a day, and during the weekends. He says that running a convenience store is very easy, and that you don't need to think much to do it; it's an easier way to make money than manual labor. And even though running a restaurant was a very profitable business, it wasn't quite the case anymore by the time the video was filmed (2009), which left convenience stores the only kind of business that he could run in the first place. Moreover, the owner says that running a small shop was also a good choice, because you don't really need to know much of the Spanish language to successfully run the shop because people just come in, find what they're looking for, buy it, and then go back out. Thus, limited by language barriers and the profitability of the work, the immigrants don't seem to have many choices to begin with, which helps explain why so many immigrants—not just the Chinese, but also the other Asians—predominantly own these small corner shops throughout all of Spain.

=== Rising generation ===
The story, however, becomes a little different when it comes to the second generation immigrants—the children of these immigrants. A major characteristic of these Chinese-owned businesses, whether it be restaurants or corner stores, is that they are family-owned and family-run. It's a family business—every member of the family helps out and does their part in making the business successful. In fact, originally, Chinese students were reported to have higher dropout rates than those of other nationalities, because they took on jobs in the family businesses. By 2014, however, the number of second generation youth attending high school and university was higher than those of other nationalities. And with that change came a change in attitudes towards the traditional family-owned businesses. A large number of children of the Chinese immigrants who set up these businesses, however, want to deviate from such family-owned businesses. According to the article, “How Spain’s Chinese immigrants went from dishwashers to doctors” in El País, “many other children of Chinese immigrants who were either born in Spain or brought over to reunite with other family members are moving away from their parents’ traditional businesses, such as restaurants and variety stores.” And instead, they are pursuing all kinds of different degrees and starting to work as “teachers, doctors, lawyers, physicists, economists,” and more. As a result, as of 2015, there were 6,381 Chinese students studying in Spanish universities, many studying to become businessmen and lawyers as the children of the entrepreneurs who opened up their first restaurants in Spain.

Thus with the new rising generation of immigrants, we are seeing economic power coupled with an academic background, transforming their place in Spanish society as the “silent minority” to a group who is abandoning their traditional silence, speaking out, and occupying a larger visible presence in the Spanish economy and society.

== 2008 economic crisis ==
When financial crisis hit Spain in 2008, the Spanish unemployment rate grew at an alarming rate. In late 2007, the unemployment rate was reported to be 8.3%, but in the late 2010, it had risen to 20.1%. And while unemployment was a widespread phenomenon around the country, it hit the younger workers the hardest: the unemployment rate among workers who were 16 to 25 years old was 41% during this time, and 30% of foreigner younger workers were unemployed. As for the Chinese immigrants during this time, however, the story was very different: their economic success was enjoying a period of unprecedented growth. According to the National Federation of Self-Employed Workers, 30% of foreigners who started businesses in the last 10 months of 2012 were Chinese. Moreover, despite the crippling crisis surrounding the Spanish property bubble, or the housing bubble, real estate companies reported that the Chinese were buying houses at an unparalleled rate—houses that sold for €70,000 to €100,000, with the majority of the payment in cash.

Such economic success was made possible by several factors, but one of the major factors was precisely the effects that the economic crisis had on the Spanish people and their wallets. The crisis had helped Chinese-owned stores to flourish and take advantage of the fact that people were looking for bargain prices that didn't completely empty out their wallets. The relatively cheap prices of these Chinese-owned stores, then, attracted many customers, even those who would not have frequented them otherwise. According to the article, “Spain’s Chinese Immigrants Thrive in Tough Economy,” in The New York Times, “in a time of economic crisis, ubiquitous low-margin Chinese-owned bazaars, hairdressers, and supermarkets have become a lure for cost-conscious Spanish consumers.” In fact, success wasn't just limited to small-store owners; it also affected larger Chinese companies who had established markets in Spain. For example, the Chinese company, Haier, which produces and sells home appliances, had significantly benefitted from the economic crisis. Its executives stated that the crisis, “rather than being a deterrent, had provided an opportunity, as Spaniards were willing to consider competitively priced washing machines and air-conditioners, even if their brands were less well known.” Thus, while the crisis was a source of hardships on many Spaniards, it actually helped some businesses, such as these Chinese businesses, enjoy more success.

Spaniards’ responses to these successes were mixed. Overall, there hasn't been any major kind of backlash against Chinese—or Asian—immigrants in general, like there had been in other parts of Europe, such as Greece. However, that doesn't mean there weren't—and isn't—anti-immigrant sentiments as it relates to the economy. As Miguel Diaz puts it in his blog post, Chinese businesses have been growing because of their cheaper prices, which, in turn, have caused local Spanish businesses to close because they couldn't compete with the prices. Indeed, according to Yukiko Okazaki, the subdirector of the Fundación José Ortega y Gasset-Gregorio Marañón in Toledo, Spain, the rising economic success of Asian immigrants at the same time of the massive loss of jobs of the Spanish had led to, a certain extent, a rejection of Asians among the Spanish. Moreover, it had caused some Spaniards to question the legitimacy of their success, and bred suspicions that the Chinese were using illegal and back-door means to outcompete the local Spanish businesses. It has led to a certain degree of stereotyping and specific targeting by law enforcement, looking to crack down on what they suspect to be illegal means through which the Chinese are running their businesses.

In fact, in October, 2012, there was a nationwide investigation and crackdown on Chinese criminal gangs that led to the arrest of 80 people who were involved in money-laundering and tax evasion, which allowed for such low prices of goods sold by the Chinese. This, however, is the anomaly, not the norm of Chinese immigrants and the reason behind their economic success. According to Joacquín Beltrán Antolín, a professor at the Universitat Autònoma de Barcelona and an expert on Catalonia’s Chinese population, many people question the Asian immigrant businesses and assume that there must be some organized criminal network that helps them, but for the most part, this is not founded in truth. He says that “while Chinese entrepreneurs may avoid bank loans, they are, by and large, scrupulous in paying their taxes and playing by the rules.” The help they do get, however, is from their family: “many Chinese families have 40 members in Barcelona, all working together. Not many Catalans can say they have 40 family members here with a network of small businesses, but many Chinese can say it.”

== Effects on the general perception of Asian immigrants ==
The general perception of Asian immigrants in Spain is one of foreignness and “the outsider.” It is not uncommon to encounter remarks about Asians that might seem ignorant and founded on unjust stereotypes. For the most part, however, these marks are not made with ill intentions, but rather, bred from a lack of exposure to the topic.

Thus when the Asian immigrants appeared to be enjoying economic success in the past decade while the Spanish were struggling economically and losing their jobs, it created, to a certain degree, a rejection of Asians, as aforementioned. It led to skepticism about their success and a creation of a boundary between the Spanish and the Asian immigrants, with some Spaniards viewing Asians as foreigners who were out-competing them and taking away their jobs.

Nevertheless, the economic success of Asian immigrants had also led to a certain degree of respect rising from precisely their economic force and their influence on the economy. After all, in a capitalist society, the one who has money has power and influence. In fact, the Spanish government, noticing such economic success, passed a law in November, 2012, that offered “residency permits to foreigners who buy homes worth more than €160,000, with the specific aim of drawing Chinese and Russian investment,” and attract Chinese immigrants.

Moreover, the success of such Chinese businesses, together with the long hours that the business owners work and their demonstrated work ethic, has also created a certain degree of acknowledgement of Asians and their work ethic as their means of achieving success. There are sayings such as “trabajando como un chino”—“working like a Chinese” that is used to describe someone who is killing themselves working. There are negative connotations to this, of course, but it also shows a level of acknowledgement of the amount of work that the immigrants put in to gain their economic success.
