= Perception of East Asians in Spanish society =

Spain is home to a significant immigrant population, most of which has grown only very recently. Even right before turn of the 21st century, immigration to Spain was very small: immigrants were only 3% of the Spanish population in 1998, but 10 years later, immigrants formed 13% of the total population. Now, as of 2016, immigrants form over 9.8% of the total population. Currently, the biggest immigrant groups are Romanian, Moroccan, Ecuadorian, British and Colombian. Out of the East Asian countries, the biggest immigrant population is Chinese, which is actually the next largest immigrant group in line after the five aforementioned countries. Many Chinese immigrants are small business owners, including restaurants and corner stores, and the success of these businesses have contributed to the growing presence of Asian immigrants in the Spanish economy. Besides the Chinese, the only other immigrant groups from East Asia that form a significant part of the East Asian immigrant population in Spain are those of South Korea and Japan. In general, Koreans in Spain tend to be small business owners, South Korean company executives—known in Korean as 주재원, temporarily staying in Spain to work at the Spanish branch of his/her company—along with their immediate family members, and international students at Spanish universities. Similarly, many Japanese in Spain tend to be managers for Japanese company branches located in Spain or international students.

The general perception of East Asians in Spanish society is one of foreignness. There is a lack of political correctness to a certain extent when it comes to general discourse about Asians, but it is not necessarily ill-intentioned or meant to be negatively discriminatory or insulting; it is more from a lack of awareness that such statements and thoughts might be construed as offensive, and a relative absence of aforementioned political correctness.

== Population ==
Chinese immigrants are the largest East Asian immigrant group in Spain. However, it wasn't until the 21st century that the Asian immigrant population really started to take hold and grow. In fact, there were only 161 Chinese immigrant residents living in Spain in 1961, and between the years 1992–1996, only 4,821 immigrants from China had taken up residence in Spain, according to the National Immigrant Survey conducted by the National Institute of Statistics. Between 1997 and 2001, however, the number significantly increased: there were 19,112 Chinese immigrants that arrived in Spain during that time span, and by 2011, it was estimated that there was about 170,000 legal Chinese immigrants living in Spain—240,000, if you also count the immigrants staying illegally. Aside from the Chinese, there were 2,873 Korean immigrants living in Spain according to the Immigrant Survey published in 2006, and according to the statistics released by the South Korean government in 2011, there were 4,080 Koreans living in Spain as of that year. As for Japanese immigrants, it was noted that there were 5,167 Japanese immigrants residing in Spain as of 2001. In general, 19,680 immigrants had entered Spain from Asia and Oceania between the years 1987–1991. Then, following the same pattern as that of the Chinese immigrant population, there was a sharp rise in numbers at the turn of the century: 62,599 immigrants arrived in Spain from the years 1997–2001, and from 2002 to 2007, 68,545 immigrants had come in from Asia and Oceania, creating 216,244 immigrants from Asia and Oceania in Spain, as of 2007.

== Common misconceptions ==
Because Asian presence in Spain had really only started to grow in the last 20 years or so, there is still a widespread general unawareness about Asians and their culture. Many of the comments about Asians and Asian-ness is not necessarily one of discrimination with ill intentions, but simply one of inexperience, unfamiliarity, and naiveté with respect to the topic. For example, one of the prevalent misconceptions seem to be the automatic linkage of one's physical appearance—their race according to their physical characteristics—with one's national identity. If someone has the typical physical characteristics of an East Asian and looks to be of Asian heritage, it is a common occurrence for the people to assume that he/she is directly from Asia. Even if someone is from the United States but is of Asian heritage—for example, Chinese-American, Japanese-American, or Korean-American—it is common for his/her identity to be thought of as that of his/her Asian heritage, not of the United States. One's physical appearances that reveal an Asian heritage dictates his/her identity, not necessarily one's place of origin or place of current residence. The idea of a dual identity is a relatively foreign concept to many, which reveals the general lack of exposure to the idea of immigration and the process of adaptation, assimilation and acculturation. Moreover, not only is it assumed that a person who physically looks like an East Asian is directly from Asia, it is also often assumed that he/she is automatically from China, which simply speaks to what we have seen from the previous section with numbers of immigrants from China and Asia in general—the predominant group of Asian immigrants in Spain is the Chinese, so the Chinese immigrants had become the default, the standard, image of Asian immigrants in the eyes of many.

=== Dual identities ===
Not only that, the idea of a dual identity as it relates to an Asian heritage and an affiliation with Spain itself also seems to be a foreign concept. In a blog post written by Josephine Stefani, she mentions that many Chinese-Spaniards have a hard time being viewed as "Spanish," even if they were born and grew up in Spain. The idea of hyphenated identities, such as being Chinese-Spanish, is still relatively new, and because of this, many people simply assume that if you look Chinese, you were from China.

This has also been the case based on Sarah Ann Levine's experiences in Madrid, according to her blog post for the Berkley Center for Religion, Peace, and World Affairs at Georgetown University. She refers to the treatment of and the conversation surrounding Asians in Madrid as a general absence of political correctness that, from the perspective of someone coming from the United States where the preoccupation with political correctness makes everyone tread with extreme caution around sensitive topics—with one of the most sensitive topics being race—can appear very jarring. Nevertheless, Levine's experiences agree with those previously mentioned—she notes that "everyone who is Asian in Madrid is called a chino. There is no differentiation between Koreans, Japanese, or Chinese. Everyone is chino, which is offensive in itself. There is no reason to get to find out if they are, in fact, of Chinese descent. Many times, I have heard Madrileños talking about los chinos in a very negative and dismissive context."

== Impact of history ==
Spain had been, to some extent, a closed country, even though it is opening up a lot more now these days, with a lot more Spaniards who travel and work in Asian countries, especially China. It is also true, however, that when the Spanish financial crisis hit in 2008, there was a certain degree of rejection and hostility towards Asians, because the Chinese were rising in their economic status while the Spanish were declining in theirs and losing their jobs. They perceive that the immigrants are taking away jobs from the Spanish—a belief that is amplified by the fact that immigration has really only started to significantly increase in the last two decades or so—and this perception has undoubtedly bred some resentment towards the Asian population to some extent in recent years. At the same time, however, the economic power of Asian immigrants had become undeniable, and their financial successes had also bred to an extent, a certain degree of recognition of their presence in Spain.

=== 2008 Spanish Olympic basketball team controversy ===
In 2008, an international controversy was caused by a photo of the Spanish men's Olympic basketball team before the 2008 Summer Olympic Games in Beijing, China. The picture showed the team pulling the outer corners of their eyes to make them slanted. It was featured in a newspaper advertisement. This caused an uproar and a significant amount of backlash from those who construed the pose as a racist gesture towards the Chinese. Upon the publication of the picture, The Guardian, a British newspaper company, predicted that although "there is no obvious intention to upset their Olympic hosts in Beijing…the irresponsible picture is likely to cause controversy and could be interpreted so as to lead to accusations of racism". Similarly, NBC, a major American news outlet, reported that many Asian Americans found the picture to be "an offensive, racist gesture, something borne out of playground bullying and harassment," and stated that the photo had been criticized by the international media, with negative consequences for Madrid's bid to host the 2016 Summer Olympics. The team, however, denied any ill intentions with the making of the photo. One of the basketball players in the team, Jose Manuel Calderon, said that "the picture has been interpreted incorrectly," and that the pose was created as a response to the sponsor's request to "pose with a ‘wink’ to our participation in Beijing." According to Calderon, the pose was merely "an Oriental expression with our eye," a gesture that they made because they "thought it was something appropriate and that it would always be interpreted as somewhat loving". The Spanish media, such as El Mundo and El Pais seemed to take a neutral stance on this controversy, simply reporting on the issue and detailing what had happened and what had been said by the international media and those directly involved in the incident. Meanwhile, in the midst of such controversy, the spokesperson for the Chinese Embassy in Spain said that he did not take the gesture to be offensive or racist, and neither did his country. He maintained that the China–Spain relations were as good as usual. This sentiment was echoed by the Chinese spectators of the Olympic Games interviewed by NBC, who didn't understand what the gesture even meant, and did not find it to be as offensive as Chinese immigrants abroad.

== Integration into Spanish society ==
Whether such perception of Asians is made out of conscious bad intentions or simply ignorance, however, some Asian-Spaniards are still skeptical and pessimistic about the place of Asians in Spanish society. According to "Chinese-Catalans," written by Richard Schweid in the Barcelona Metropolitan, "some Chinese people here feel that Catalan society has a long way to go before it is ready to accept their presence and wholly integrate them". For every person who feels that he/she has "never felt discriminated against," and that he/she is "just one more Catalan," where "being Chinese gave me either an advantage or disadvantage," there is another person who disagree and is skeptical about the extent to which Asians are fully accepted into Spanish society. As Heidi Tsai puts it in the aforementioned article, "I can speak the language and hold a job, but that doesn’t feel like integration. You’re always the Chinese person who’s speaking Catalan. It doesn’t matter what you achieve, you’ll be judged by the way you look". In fact, the label as a "chino", or sometimes, "chinito", often seems to occur regardless of one's level of assimilation in Spanish society or one's fluency in Spanish, but instead primarily based one's physical appearance and the Asian heritage that it shows.

=== Exclusivity of Chinese immigrant communities ===
Some argue that the closed-off nature of the Chinese community and their tendency to keep to their own is actually what is hindering the Spanish society from fully integrating the Chinese—and Asians in general—as their own. As Gladys Nieto writes in "The Chinese in Spain," the Spanish population regards "the Chinese as a closed and somewhat mysterious community." It is not a rare occurrence to encounter exaggerated stereotypes of the Chinese and prejudices that makes references to and generalizes their social organization patterns in everyday conversations. While this reasoning—the tendency of the Chinese to stick to themselves—has merit, however, it is not fair to expect immigrants to not form some kind of affiliation, some kind of community, with people from their home country, no matter what country. In a country filled with foreign-everything—foreign language, foreign culture, foreign food, foreign customs, and more—a taste of home, a hint of home, that one can get by associating at times with people and things that remind them of their home country can actually be vital to his/her willingness to integrate themselves into their new society. Feelings of homesickness and missing different aspects about one's home country isn't always just something one can fight off and forget about; it is something that, when not satisfied or solved, can sometimes lead to negative feelings that inhibit him/her from wanting to assimilate into the new environment. Homesickness creates feelings of anxiety, sadness, nervousness, and almost an obsession with thoughts about "home," where "home" doesn't just mean the physical space provided by your house, but also "what’s normal, what is routine, the larger sense of social space, because those are things that help us survive."
