= Torres de la Casería de Ossio =

Coordinates: 36°28′59″N 6°11′58″W

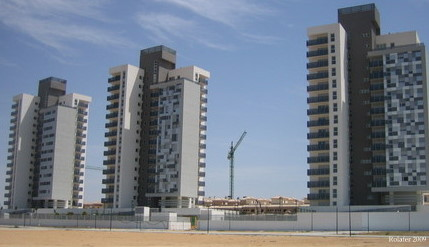
Torres de la Casería de Ossio tower complex

Torres de la Casería de Ossio is a complex of three towers of sixteen floors located in San Fernando in the Province of Cádiz, Andalusia, Spain. As of 2013 it is the tallest building in the city, surpassing the Hospital Militar de San Carlos by several metres when built in 2007.
