= Bell Island (Newfoundland and Labrador) =

Island in Conception Bay, Newfoundland and Labrador

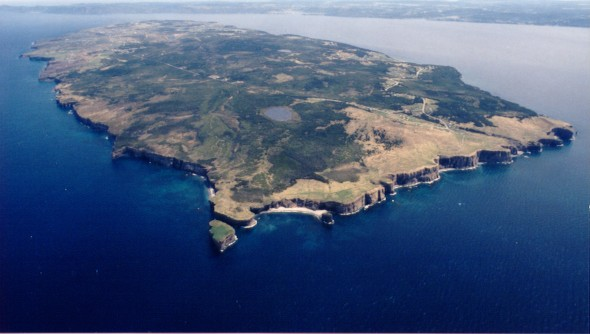
- Aerial view of Bell Island

- Location within Newfoundland

Geography
- Location: Conception Bay, Newfoundland
- Coordinates: 47°37′58″N 52°57′57″W
- Area: 34 km^{2} (13 sq mi)
- Coastline: 27 km (16.8 mi)
- Highest elevation: 148 m (486 ft)

Administration
- Canada
- Province: Newfoundland and Labrador

Demographics
- Population: 2,079 (2021)
- Bell Island Lighthouse
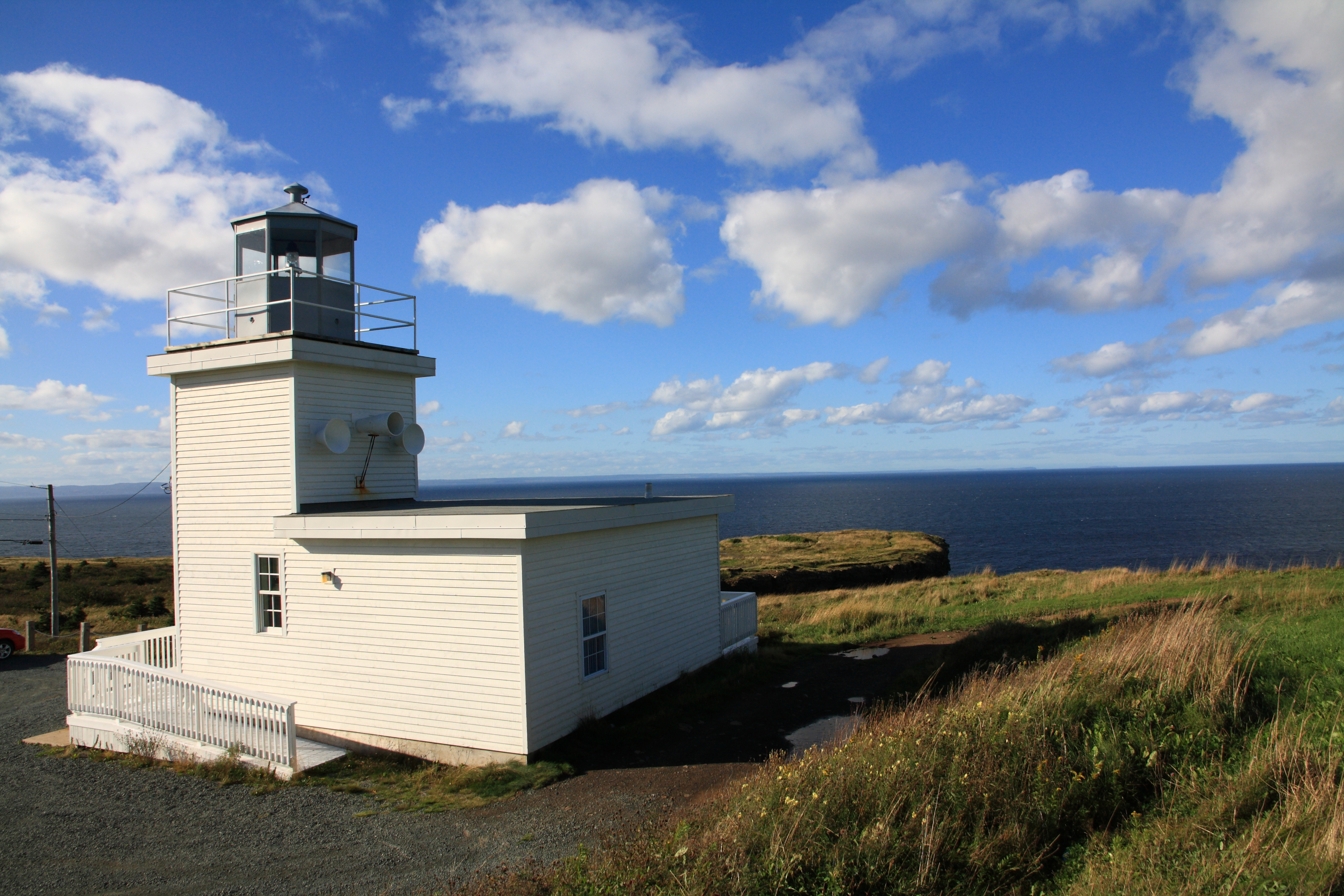
- Constructed: 1966
- Construction: wooden tower
- Height: 9 m (30 ft)
- Shape: quadrangular tower atop a 1-storey fog signal building
- Markings: white tower, grey metallic lantern
- Operator: Canadian Coast Guard
- Focal height: 53 m (174 ft)
- Range: 17 nmi (31 km; 20 mi)
- Characteristic: Fl W 6s

Bell Island is an island that is part of Newfoundland and Labrador, Canada's easternmost province. With an area of 34 square kilometres (13 sq mi), it is by far the largest island in Conception Bay, a large bay in the southeast of the island of Newfoundland. The provincial capital of St. John's is less than 20 kilometres (12 mi) to the east.

The coastline of Bell Island consists almost entirely of cliffs that tower up to 45 metres (148 ft) above the surf and also has several special rock formations. The island is home to four settlements with a total of over 2,000 inhabitants. The vast majority of them live in the main settlement of Wabana, which can be reached from Newfoundland via a ferry connection to Portugal Cove. To the south are the hamlets of Lance Cove, Bickfordville and Freshwater.

From 1895 to 1966, large-scale iron ore mining took place on Bell Island. As a result, the relatively small island acquired great international economic importance as it quickly grew into one of the most important iron ore producers in the world. In addition, the ore mined in the mines of Bell Island was very important to the Allied war industry during World War II, which led to Nazi Germany attacking twice. At its peak, more than 12,000 people lived there.

Since the end of mining, the population has fallen dramatically and there has been a severe economic downturn. Due to the few remaining jobs, the majority of residents now commute daily via ferry to the St. John's Metropolitan Area. In recent years, the local economy has turned to tourism to a significant extent, with the natural beauty, mining history and shipwrecks being the main draws.

Since 1988, Bell Island mining has been recognized by the federal government as a "national historic event".

According to the Canadian Broadcasting Corporation, there are concerns that some of the underground mines could collapse, causing both an earthquake and tidal wave.

== Toponymy ==
Originally the island was known as Great Bell Isle, although this evolved into the shortened form Bell Isle as early as the late 18th century. Bell Island has been in use as the official name since 1896, although the old name Bell Isle also continued to live on in popular speech for a hundred years.

The island takes its name from a distinctive cone-shaped sea stack near the western cape known as The Bell (sometimes called Bell Rock). The name of this rock comes from the fact that it is similar in shape to a traditional bell protruding upside down from the water.

== History ==
=== Early history ===
Before the arrival of the Europeans, Newfoundland was the territory of the now extinct Beothuk people. European fishermen and pirates already frequented the island early in the 16th century, mainly for the purpose of stocking up on potable water. The hamlet of Freshwater to the south and Freshwater Cove to the north are reminiscent of this. (Note: In both the north and south of Bell Island there is a cove called "Freshwater Cove". The southern cove of that name is near the hamlet of Freshwater.)

As early as 1578, the English merchant Anthony Parkhurst discovered that the island contained iron ore. Sources from 1610 and 1612 also indicate that Bell Island was known to have iron ore containing rock. Finally, in 1628, settler leader John Guy sent samples of Bell Island rocks to England for analysis. Some members of Guy's colony at Cuper's Cove attempted to claim the island thereon against the London and Bristol Company, but without success. Despite early knowledge that the island had at least some mining potential, the information was ultimately not used. The heavy rocks of Bell Island were historically mined on a limited scale, but only for use as ship ballast or for the manufacture of killicks, a Newfoundland-type anchor made of wood and stone. It was not until about the year 1819 that a small-scale iron ore mining operation was first reported (near Back Cove), albeit presumably briefly and without much success.

From the early 17th century, Bell Island, part of the so-called English coast of Newfoundland, was a seasonal base and thus non-permanent settlement for fishermen mainly from England, Ireland and the Channel Islands. In the 1670s and 1680s, it was a base for fishermen from Dartmouth, a harbour town in England's West Country. In the fishing season of 1681, for example, there were two ships and 26 boats that together accounted for a crew of 130 men.

=== Establishment of a permanent settlement ===
In the early 18th century, the first people had settled permanently on the island. The oldest Great Belle Isle census is from 1706 and records 85 residents. It concerned eight heads of households – namely five families with children and three single men – who together owned eight large and five small boats. As many as 59 people who resided on the island were (resident) staff of these families active in the labour-intensive fishing industry. Gregory Normore, a fisherman and farmer from Jersey, is believed to have settled on the island around 1740 and was married to a Newfoundland woman named Catherine. They were not the first inhabitants, but are considered the first in traditional lore and local folklore. This is mainly the case because Normore has a gravestone left and because the couple still has numerous descendants on the island in the 21st century.

During the entire 18th century, there was no demographic growth; in 1794, the population was still only 87. In the 19th century, however, there was a clear growth with already 338 inhabitants in 1845. The island thus grew into one of the many typical Newfoundland fishing villages, the so-called outports. The inhabitants were mainly of English and Irish descent; as such, early on, the community consisted of a mix of Catholics and Anglicans. In addition to fishing, they also lived from agriculture and livestock. These secondary activities were much more important there than elsewhere, as the island has very fertile soil by Newfoundland standards. Farmers there produced, both for their own consumption and for sale to the townspeople of St. John's, potatoes, strawberries, blackcurrants, turnips, and white cabbage.

Beginning in the 1830s, a real secondary sector also began to emerge on Bell Island. For example, from that period on a shipyard was active in Lance Cove and in 1848 a brick factory was opened there as well. There were also a number of people working in sectors such as woodworking and trade. Throughout the 19th century, a large proportion of men were also active in winter in seal hunting, then an important part of Newfoundland's economy.

In 1843, under the supervision of the Anglican Bishop of Newfoundland, the first church opened on the island, after a Protestant school had been opened two years earlier. The first Catholic church opened in 1884. In the following decades, they were followed by a house of worship of the methodists (1901) and of the Salvation Army (1910).

=== Beginning and flourishing of mining ===
In 1892 Messrs. Butler and Miller of Topsail obtained a mining licence for the iron ore on the island, which at the time was first identified as hematite. In 1894 they leased their rights to the New Glasgow Coal, Iron & Railroad Company (known as the "Scotia Company" (Note: Since 1898 this company was officially known as the "Nova Scotia Iron and Steel Company". In 1901, it changed its name to the "Nova Scotia Steel and Coal Company".)) of neighbouring Canada, which began mining the hematite in 1895. The weak and poor government of the Colony of Newfoundland was eager to see such foreign investors come. (Note: Newfoundland was originally a British colony and in 1907 became an independent country (or dominion) within the British Empire. It was not until April 1, 1949 that Newfoundland and thus Bell Island joined the Canadian Confederation.) The mining site was the easternmost in North America and was therefore given the name "Wabana", a combination of two terms from the native Abenaki language which should mean "place of the first light". (Note: The native Abenaki people have absolutely no connection with Newfoundland. The name was given by Thomas Cantley, the secretary of the New Glasgow Coal and Steel Company.) The location was ideal as the ore could be loaded onto ships immediately and, in addition, it was close to North American and European markets. On December 24, 1895, the first fully loaded ship departed for the steel industry of Nova Scotia. On July 3, 1896, the first ship departed for the United States and the first transatlantic shipload departed for the port of Rotterdam on November 22, 1897. As early as 1899 the Scotia Company definitively purchased the mining rights and shortly afterwards they sold a part of them to the Dominion Iron and Steel Company (DISCO). In the following decades, therefore, there were two companies operating side by side. Originally the extraction at Wabana concerned open-cast mining, but from 1903 the above-ground hematite was exhausted and only underground work could be done in underground mines.

With the start of mining, the economy of the island changed drastically and there was a very strong population growth. The Wabana mining site grew into a large and prosperous mining village. Gradually almost everyone on the island lived directly or indirectly from that industry. High production made Newfoundland a major iron ore exporter early in the 20th century. A large part of the mined ore was exported to Sydney, an industrial town in the north of Nova Scotia, where processing and smelting took place. However, the at the time industrially emerging country Germany was also a very important market. An important reason for this was that the Krupp steel group was willing to pay a higher price than the Canadians and Americans. (Note: The Krupp steel group had developed an efficient process to strip the Bell Island ore of its phosphorus. They then converted the phosphorus extracted from the hematite into phosphate to make fertiliser. In this way they were able to realize additional turnover with the purchased hematite.)

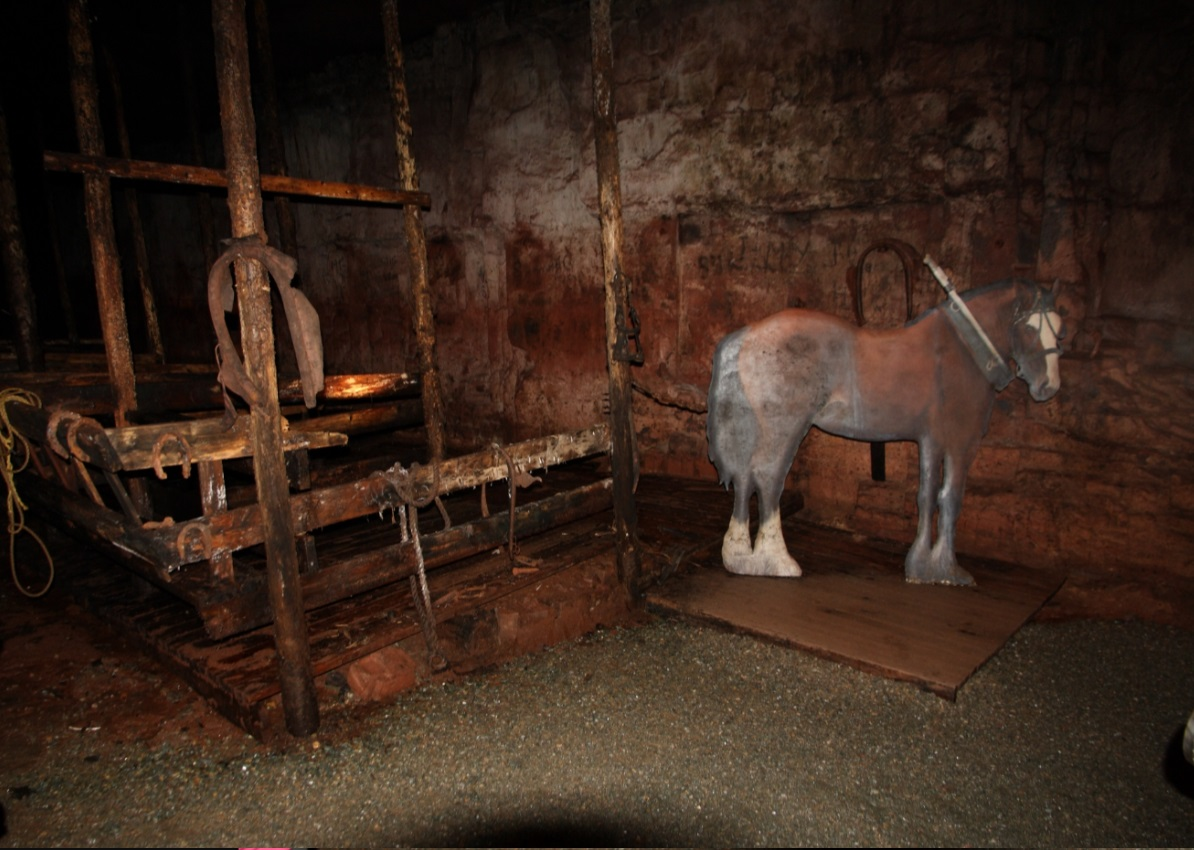
Underground horse stable in the No. 2 Mine

From the beginning there were occasional conflicts between the miners and other workers on the one hand and their employer on the other, especially regarding income. Already in 1896 a first (unsuccessful) strike took place when 180 miners demanded an increase in the hourly wage from 10 to 12 cents. In 1900 there was for the first time a real labour union on the island. They were largely behind the organization of the first large-scale strike (1600 workers) demanding 15 cents per hour. After bitter negotiations, the "Kelligrews Treaty" was negotiated, which gave the miners a limited raise to 12.5 cents an hour, but the union was dissolved. Accidents resulting in injuries or deaths also occurred regularly, to the extent that the Newfoundland government felt compelled to introduce mining legislation in 1906. In those early years the work was done under candlelight and there was also a lot of child labour. Until the 1950s horses were used as working animals to pull empty mine cars and they had underground stables as they stayed in the mines for weeks to months at a time.

Already in the early 20th century, mining jobs attracted a small number of immigrants from faraway places to Bell Island. These included a small group of Chinese as well as some Lebanese Christians. However, the vast majority of workers were Newfoundlanders from the immediate area, mainly from St. John's and from other coastal towns along Conception Bay and Newfoundland's east coast. In the early days of mining, a large proportion of them also continued to live in those places. They stayed in temporary residences in Wabana during the week and went back to their families on the weekends. There were also many men who fished part of the year at sea and went to work in the mines for several months outside the fishing season. Over the years, however, more and more workers and their families moved permanently to Bell Island. In 1911 the island already had more than 3000 inhabitants (compared to only about 700 inhabitants before the start of mining). It had grown into one of the major iron ore producers in the world.

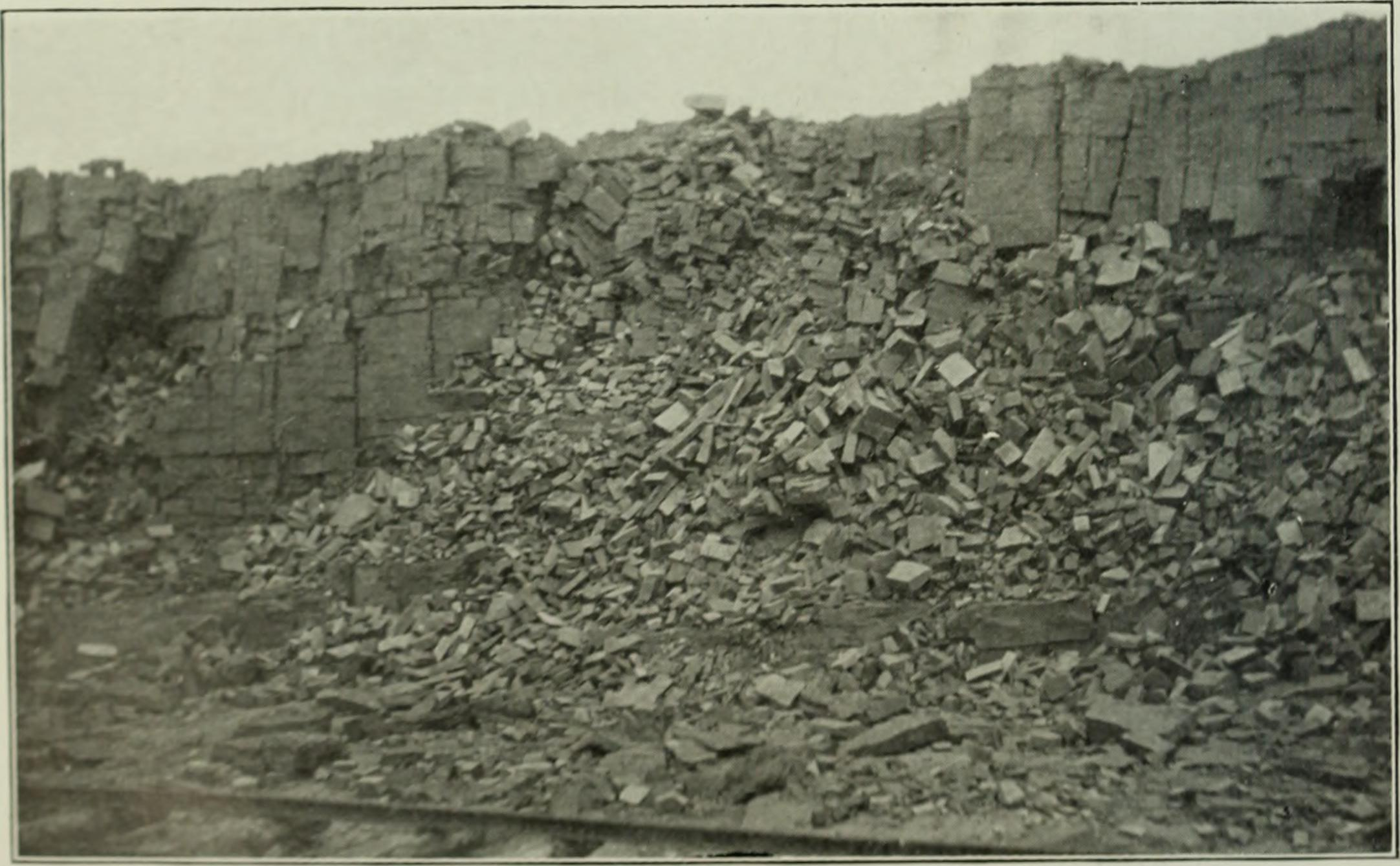
Photo of the original open-cast mine on Bell Island (c. 1900). The railway in the foreground was intended for mine carts.

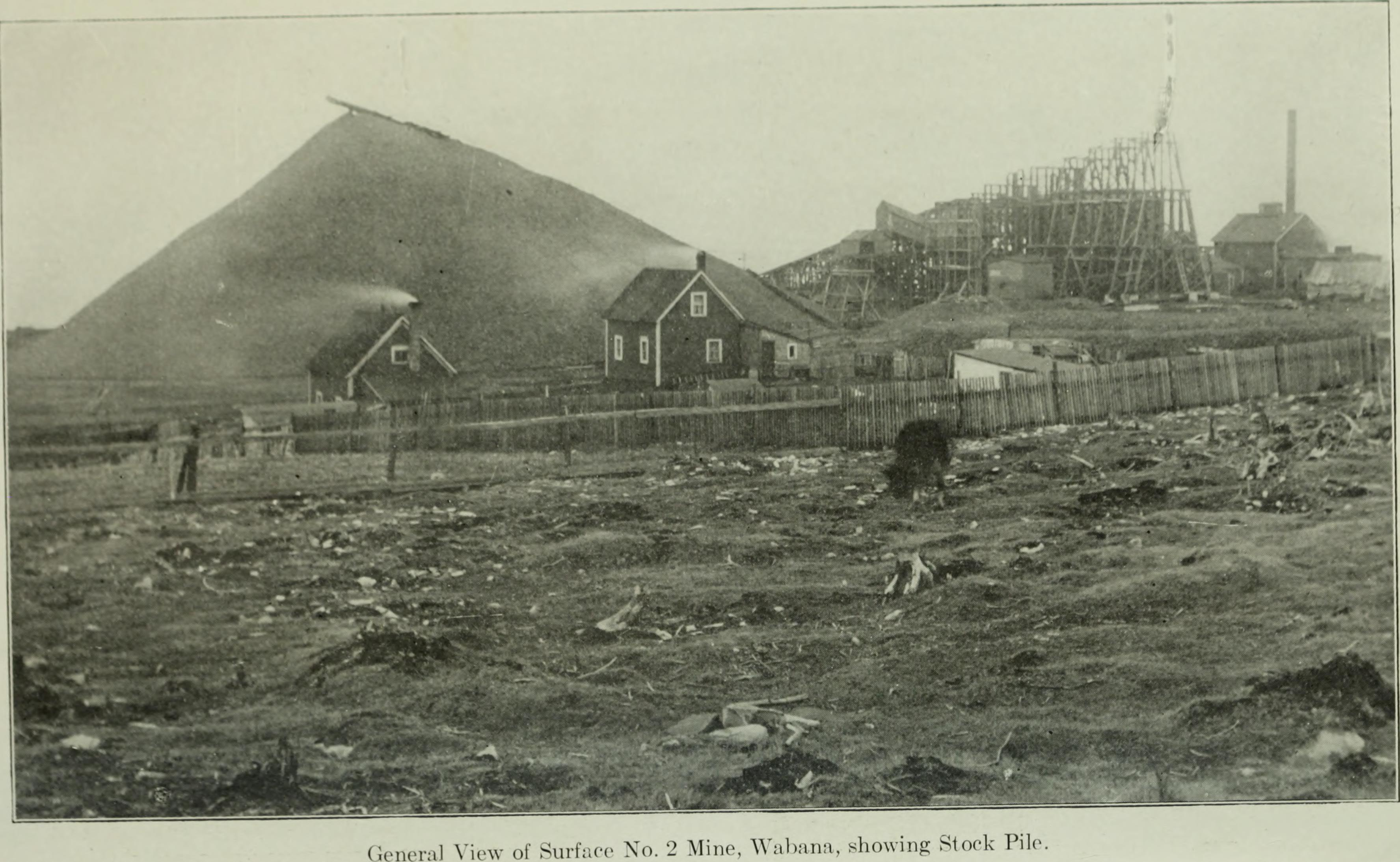
Above-ground portion of the No. 2 Mine with a huge pile of mined ore (early 20th century) next to it. Such heaps were built in winter, as shipping was then at a standstill.

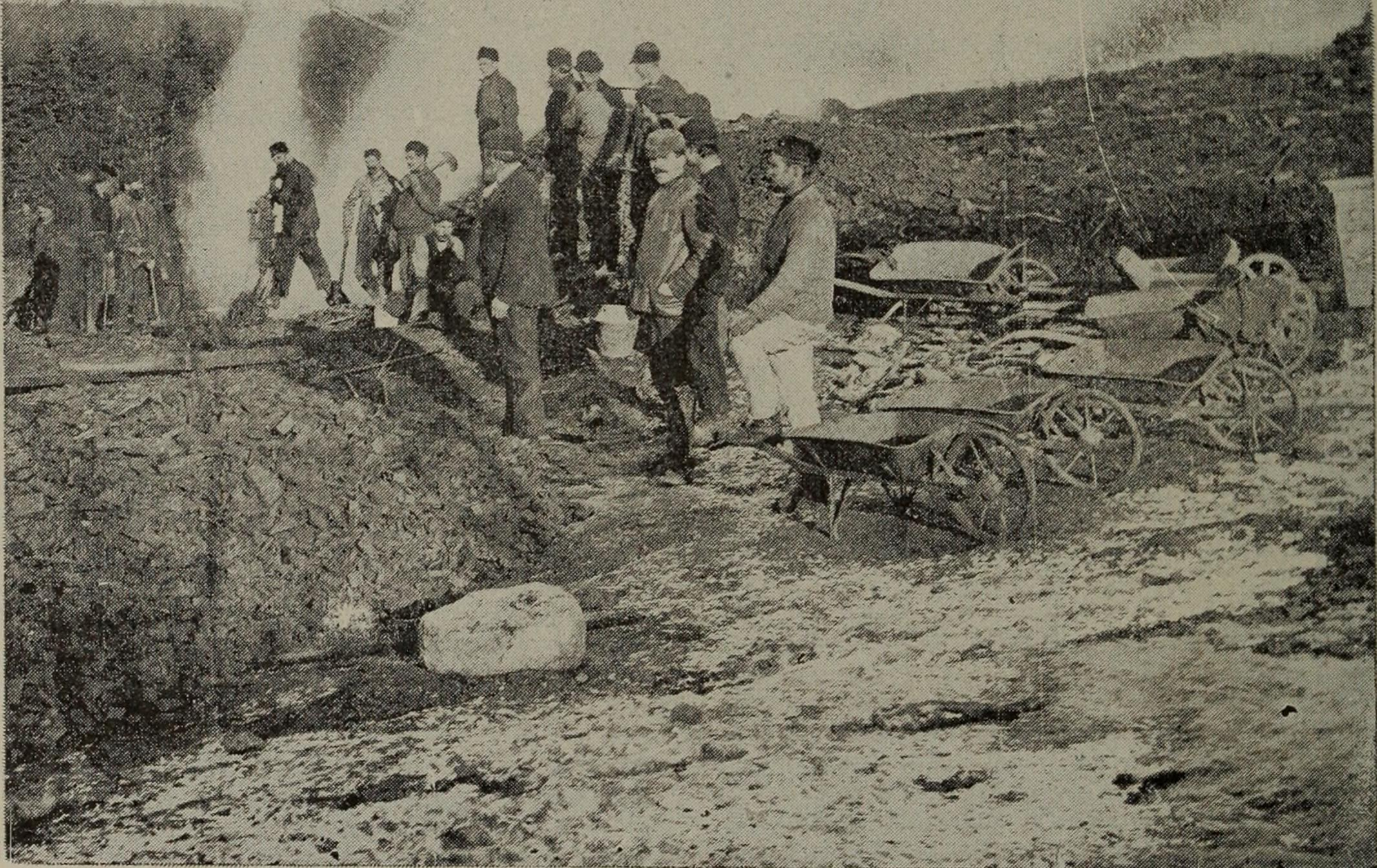
Miners with shovels and wheelbarrows working at an ore heap (c. 1907)

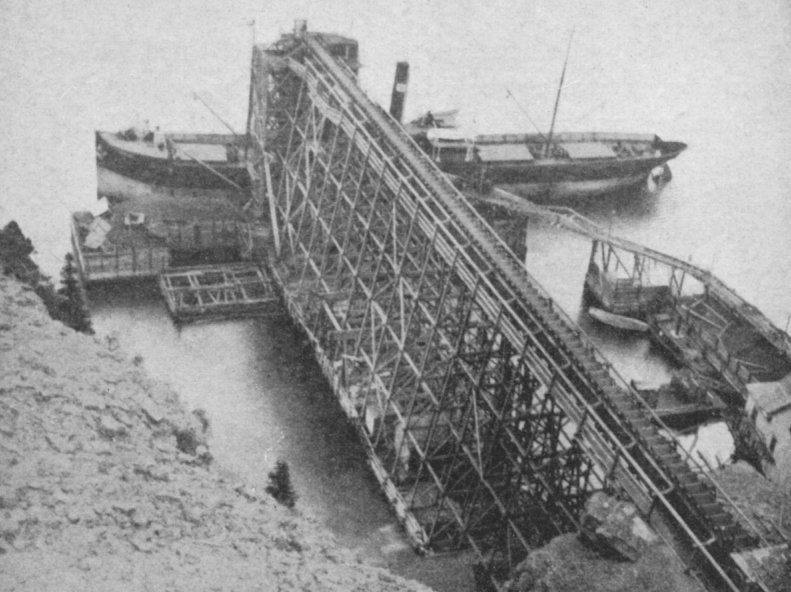
The loading pier in the port of Wabana (c. 1903)

=== First World War ===
In the decade before World War I, Germany had surpassed Canada for the first time as the largest buyer of iron ore. The total annual amount mined was already around 1 million tons. The outbreak of the war in 1914 therefore caused a major drop in exports as hostile Germany disappeared as a sales market. During the war, there was some concern in Newfoundland about German espionage, including the possible possession of detailed plans of the mines by German officers or the Krupp group (which produced combat weapons).

After the outbreak of the war in 1914, mining was almost completely stopped for a whole year. In total, 200 Bell Island men left for the front in Europe during that period, ranging from 16-year-olds to men in their late 30s. 24 of them enlisted on September 2, 1914, the first day Newfoundlanders could enlist for military service. A large proportion of those enlisting as soldiers were members of Christian youth groups such as the Church Lads Brigade and the Catholic Cadet Corps. They served as soldiers in battles of the Newfoundland Regiment in Northern France, Belgium and the Ottoman Empire or served in some cases as lumberjacks in Scotland. In the end, 29 Bell Islanders were killed on the European front and dozens more were wounded. Several were killed in Beaumont-Hamel and Monchy-le-Preux, two French places that have become infamous for Newfoundlanders. Other fatalities occurred in French places such as Cambrai and Ginchy, at the Ottoman Gallipoli or on Belgian soil at Passendale, Ypres, Ledegem and Vichte. Still others stayed in German prison camps after being captured by the enemy.

Production at the various Bell Islands mines resumed in 1915, although there was no real recovery until 1916. During the war there was a limited recovery due to war-related demand and limited rise in the iron price, although this was by no means sufficient to compensate for the loss of the German export market. The war also hampered other export opportunities. The end of the war meant another blow to the local economy, as the demand for iron fell even further.

=== Interbellum ===
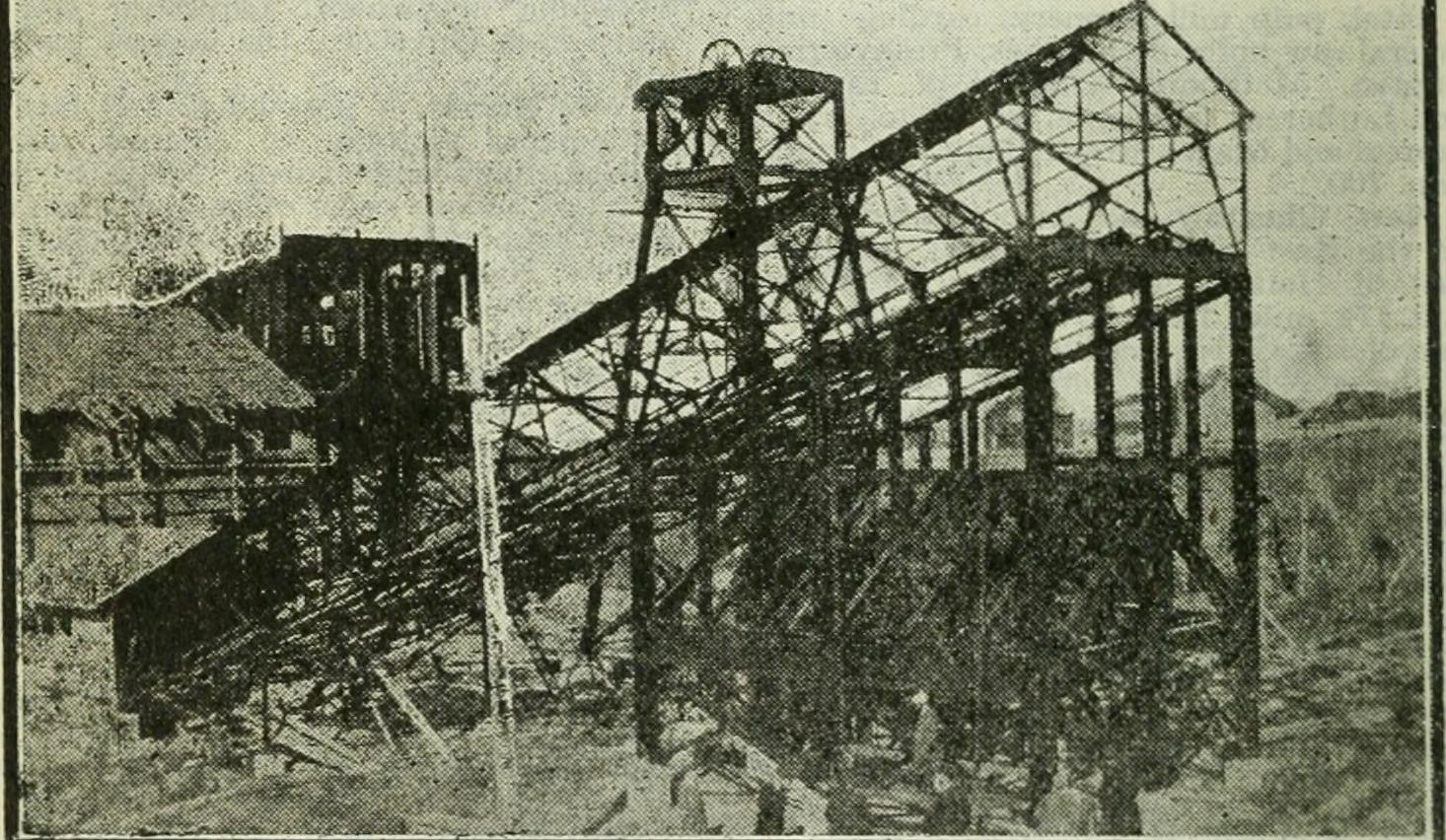
Iron ore conveyor trestle at loading pier (c. 1919)

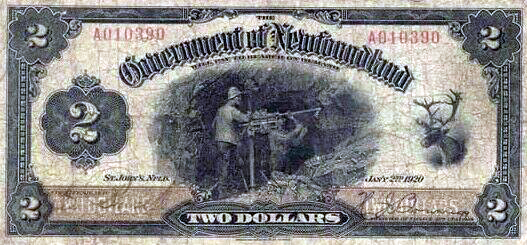
The Newfoundland 2 dollar bill, introduced in 1920, depicted the miners of Wabana

In 1920 the mines passed from the Scotia Company and DISCO to the British Empire Steel Company (BESCO). It was the beginning of a decade of mismanagement and high debt. (Note: BESCO went bankrupt in 1926, after which the National Trust Company managed the mines until 1930. (Neary, "Epic Tragedy", p. 211.)) Between 1920 and 1923, Newfoundland also went through an economic crisis. The combination of these resulted in many layoffs in the 1920s. Two mines even closed their doors. The government kept the unemployed workers busy by building Middleton Avenue (the road between West Mines and Freshwater). Spurred on by these difficulties, the workers reunited in 1922 in a union, although it had largely disintegrated by 1926. The population size, on the other hand, continued to grow continuously all this time. As early as 1923, Bell Island had surpassed Harbour Grace as the second largest place in the Dominion of Newfoundland (after the capital St. John's).

From 1920 onwards, Germany gradually resumed its imports. As early as the second half of the 1920s, the country had even once again become the main buyer of the Bell Island ore. This was very important for the livelihood of the islanders as it considerably reduced the malaise of the 1920s. The Germans had increasingly turned to Bell Island as the Treaty of Versailles had severely hampered most of their other import options. In 1920–1930, Germany imported some 6.2 million tons of iron ore from the Wabana mines, due to the occupation of the Ruhr (which was also damaging to Bell Island). That amounts to 55% of the total mined quantities in that period. (Note: In 1920-1930 the rest went largely to Canada (40%) and only a small part to the United Kingdom and the United States (together 5%).)

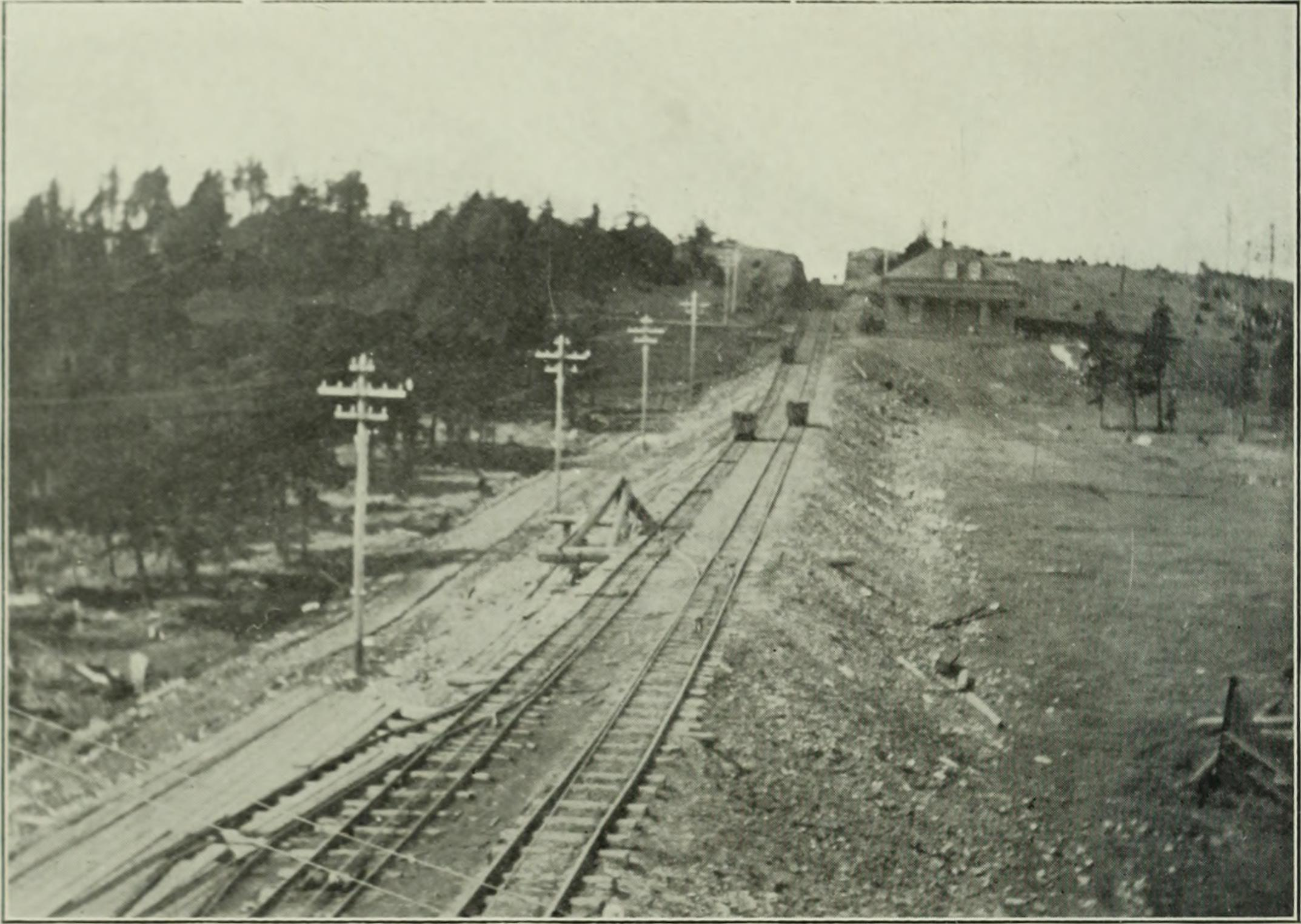
There were double tracks between the pier and the mines which were used to transport the ore via mine cars

At that time, Wabana had largely grown into a company town, built after the North American trends of the time, with workers being housed close to the mines. However, it was rather a hybrid between a typical company town and an ordinary settlement. This is because there was already a settlement before the industrial rise and because there always also were residents and businesses that were not directly connected to the mining companies. The government provided no, or at least no steadfast, local council for the Bell Islanders. With the exception of a few soon-discontinued council attempts in the 1910s and 1920s, there was no local government at all. (Note: Historian Peter Neary frames this in the "endemic weakness of local government" that was typical of "old Newfoundland".) This gap was partly filled by the supervisory staff of the mining companies, which provided a limited and somewhat paternalistic form of local government. Until 1949, six of the eight police officers were under contract with the mine company (and only two with the Newfoundland government).

At the beginning of the 20th century, thanks to mining and continuous population growth, the island got all kinds of modern facilities relatively early. For example, from 1907 the island was already connected to the electricity network, which was important for the further professionalization of the mining industry. That same year an official ferry connection was created, albeit then from Kelligrews, located on the south coast of the bay. In 1913, a tram line also opened, carrying passengers and goods over Beach Hill, the steep hill just past the ferry terminal. From 1922 a telephone cable also ran to the island and in 1931 a local radio station was established. With the Wabana Druggist there was already a first local monthly magazine in 1910, although the weekly magazine Bell Island Miner in particular was long-lasting (1913–1944). Other facilities provided the island in the early 20th century included shops, hotels, restaurants, a courthouse and sports clubs.

In 1930, the Dominion Steel Company (DOSCO) took control of the mining operation in its entirety. (Note: The mines had different owners, but DOSCO was the best known. From 1949 they were managed by Dominion Wabana Ore Ltd., a subsidiary of DOSCO. In 1957 they were taken over by A.V. Roe Ltd. and their assets were in turn taken over by Siddeley Hawker Canada in 1962. All the while, however, the operator remained popularly known as "DOSCO".) Shortly after the takeover, however, the Great Depression began, which led to years of reduced global demand for iron and steel. In the first half of that decade in particular, this was negative for the growth of the island economy. For several years there was a high unemployment rate reminiscent of the early 1920s, especially in 1934 when only one mine was open for a while. Most mining families continued to engage in small-scale farming, fishing, bird hunting and berry picking to supplement the family income. This was especially important in periods of economic crisis, such as the early 1930s, in order to be able to feed all mouths. In addition, on 14 January 1937, a devastating fire raged in the town square of Wabana, which reduced fourteen shops and seven houses to ashes.

From 1936, however, mining had started to prosper again. At that time, more than 6,000 people already lived on the island. It was the beginning of a positive trend for many years under the management of DOSCO. The German rearmament in the late 1930s, including the construction of tanks, aircraft and submarines, was a positive factor that meant a way out of the crisis for Bell Island (because of the accompanying demand for iron). On August 26, 1939, less than a week before the start of World War II, the last German freighter set out for home fully loaded.

=== Second World War ===
In 1936 the Newfoundland government already indicated in its defense plan that the mines of Wabana were one of the five strategically important places in the country. In March 1939, when another war with Germany seemed very likely, the Commission of Government governing Newfoundland identified Bell Island as one of the most likely targets of a German attack. After all, it was obvious that the iron ore would be very important for the Allied war industry. Due to the enormous strategic importance of the island, there needed to be constant vigilance. With the Newfoundland Militia; the government (again) established a national regiment, with the protection of Bell Island as one of its main tasks. Among other things, they manned the coastal defence battery that was built in 1940 and consisted of two QF 4.7-inch Mk IV rapid-firing naval guns, each built on top of a concrete platform. In addition, the Newfoundland government also had two searchlights installed. The government of neighbouring Canada paid for part of this defensive construction project as it was also of great importance to their industry in Nova Scotia. Also in 1940 the first lighthouse was built on the island, namely in the northeast.

The war years were a traumatic period for the Bell Islanders. The disaster began with a tragic accident that happened on November 10, 1940. Two ferries collided with each other that day during a blizzard, namely the crowded W. Garland and Little Golden Dawn (which besides the captain only had an engineer on board). W. Garland sank within minutes, killing 23 people. There were only six survivors in all, including the two people aboard Little Golden Dawn.

As had been feared years earlier, hostile Nazi Germany also effectively launched attacks on the Bell Island mining industry during World War II. In 1942 they launched the attack twice with a U-boat, the fearsome German type of submarine. It became known as the Battle of Bell Island.

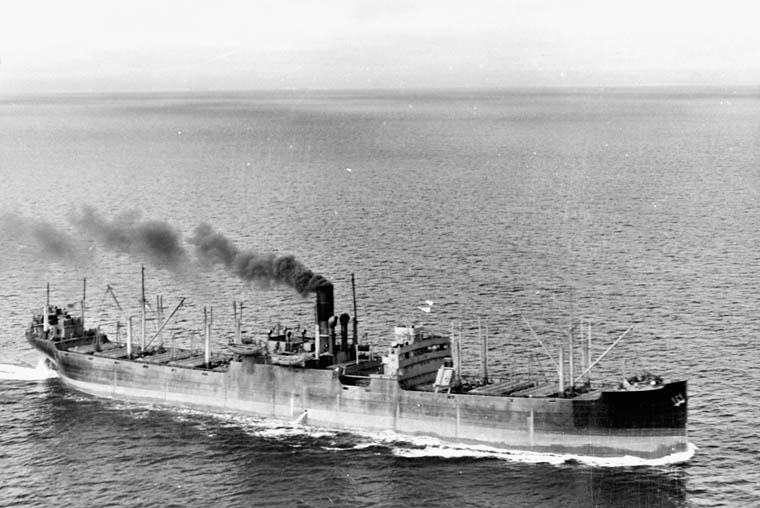
The SS Rose Castle is one of the cargo ships that was sunk by a Nazi-German U-boat in 1942 just off the Bell Island coast

In the night of 4–5 September 1942, the U-513 under the command of Rolf Rüggeberg entered Conception Bay. Around noon the submarine fired torpedoes heading for two fully loaded cargo ships: the Canadian Lord Strathcona and the British Saganaga. Saganaga, carrying 8,300 tons of iron ore, sank within three minutes. 29 people on board were killed. Lord Strathcona also sank, albeit with no fatalities. Amid the chaos, the U-boat was accidentally hit while coming to the surface and gunners from the coastal battery as well as gunners on the coal-carrying freighter "Evelyn B." fired on it. U-513 then fled Conception Bay in slightly damaged condition. After the attack, the government expanded the battery by installing additional searchlights, among other things.

On November 2, 1942 – just under two months later – another German attack followed. In the middle of the night, at about half past three, U-518 led by Friedrich Wissmann fired a torpedo towards the Greek coal transporting freighter Anna T. However, the projectile missed its target and struck the Scotia-cargo pier, which was severely damaged. The massive explosion also shook up virtually the entire island population and even shattered windows in some homes. It was one of the only Nazi attacks to hit North American soil in the entire war. Shortly afterwards, U-518 also attacked two freighters filled with ore just minutes apart. As with the first attack, it involved ships waiting to eventually cross the ocean in convoy. It concerned the Canadian Rose Castle (hit by two torpedoes) and P.L.M. 27, a British-owned Free French ship (hit by one torpedo). Rose Castle was wrecked with 10,300 tons of ore and much of the crew. Also the P.L.M. 27 sank to the bottom with 12 fatalities among those on board.

The attacks took a total of 65 lives. What was most important for the Germans is that thousands of tons of iron ore were lost and four large freighters were disabled. The importance attached to the missions is clear from the fact that in the second attack they specifically sought out some crew members who were already familiar with the waters of Conception Bay via cargo ships. In December 1942, Newfoundland government responded via the placement of anti-submarine nets in Conception Bay, after which there was no more attack. In 2019, Canada recognized the attacks as a national historic event and in 2022, the federal government put up an official memorial and information panel.

=== Peak of mining ===
World War II ultimately proved to be a period of growth for Bell Island's mining economy. The (again) temporary loss of Germany as a market was amply compensated by the demand from the British and Canadian war industries. Between 1936 and 1945, the average annual production was more than 1.15 million tons, which is higher than ever before. Growth continued unabated after the war, not least because the Germans resumed their imports in 1948. The period 1945–1959 was economically the most stable period in the history of the Bell Island mining industry, with major investments and expansions up to 1956. In the early 1950s, for example, the mining operator constructed an airstrip and a reservoir. All this was based on the massive demand for iron ore due to the post-war reconstruction of Europe. Until then, Bell Island also remained the sole supplier to Sydney's steel industry in Nova Scotia; which was also owned by DOSCO.

When Newfoundland joined the Canadian Confederation in 1949, the Bell Island mines could immediately call themselves the largest iron ore mining operation in Canada (with over 43% of the total national production). (Note: However, it only retained this status for a short time due to the opening of the huge iron ore mines in Labrador West in the early 1950s.) (Note: The constituency Harbour Main-Bell Island was one of the most opposing to Confederation in all of Newfoundland (Neary, Newfoundland, p. 324).) There was also a well-organized workers' union since 1941 and working conditions and safety were better at that time than in, for example, most American mines. It was during this heyday that the government officially granted Wabana municipality status in 1950, albeit to the dismay of a large part of the population (who were generally conservative). The inhabitants had rejected a municipality for the entire island in 1947 via a referendum. In 1960 there was a production of 2.81 million tons, the highest ever reached in a single year. The island's population peaked around 1959 towards 13,000. (Note: In 1961 the five-year census with 12,281 inhabitants determined the highest population ever. However, a decline had already been underway for a couple years.)

As early as the end of the 1950s, however, the mines encountered increasing problems due to the presence of new competitors on the market who could produce cheaper and, moreover, often delivered ore with fewer impurities. In the early 1950s, the open pit mines of the Labrador Peninsula, namely of Labrador City, Wabush and Fermont, were among the main competitors, certainly from the start of the Quebec North Shore and Labrador Railway from yonder to the seaport of Sept-Îles. In addition, the ore faced more difficulties in marketing, partly because of its high phosphorus content, which made it incompatible with the latest steelmaking technologies. In contrast, new open-cast mines in West Africa and South America produced large quantities of high-quality non-phosphorus ore. The complete lack of local anchoring of the mining government also played a role. As early as 1949, the closure of the deep and largely subsea No. 2 Mine took place, mainly because of the high cost of operating it. Opened in 1902, this mine extended up to 5.5 km out of shoreline and was up to 4.8 km deep, making it the largest submarine iron ore mine in the world.

The global impact of the closure of the No. 2 Mine on the employment rate had been limited overall. Due to the aforementioned problems, however, the No. 6 Mine closed in 1959, followed by the No. 4 Mine in 1962, which caused high unemployment. Since 1962 only the No. 3 Mine in operation. On April 19, 1966, the mining board announced that the latter mine would also close. When it effectively closed on June 30, 1966, 71 years of intensive iron ore mining came to an end. The steel industry linked to the mines in northern Nova Scotia also definitively stopped production that year. Joey Smallwood, the then Premier of Newfoundland, had contacts in 1966 with a possible West German buyer, but in October 1966 it was announced that this deal fell through. By the end of 1968, virtually all of the infrastructure had been dismantled and sold along with the work equipment.

The mines had been a very important source of iron ore for the economies of Canada and Germany for decades, as well as relevant quantities finding their way to the ports and steel industries of mainly the United Kingdom, the United States, Belgium and Netherlands. The total amount mined was almost 79 million tons. According to estimates based on, among other things, aeromagnetic research of the enormous non- explored undersea section, however, at least 2 billion tons of theoretically minable ore has remained untouched. Mining brought great wealth to the island, but the flip side of the coin was that over 100 miners died in 71 years.

=== Impact of the mine closures ===
The island ended up in a very serious economic depression due to the closure of the mines. As many as 95% of the working population lived directly from the mining operation. Because there was hardly any employment left, a real population exodus started already from the end of the 1950s. Between 1961 and 1971 more than half of the inhabitants left. Among them were hundreds of miners who moved with their families to the small town of Galt in Ontario because of the promise of factory jobs, to the extent that that place got "Little Bell Island" (or Little Bell Isle) as nickname. Other industrial towns in the province of Ontario, such as Windsor and Toronto, also attracted many former miners. The same was true to a lesser extent for some growth centres within the province of Newfoundland, such as the nearby capital St. John's and the western Labrador mining communities Wabush and Labrador City. One of the most famous figures within the Bell Island diaspora was Harry Hibbs. He became a folk musician based in his new home of Toronto and grew into an icon of traditional Newfoundland music. His famous song The Bell Island Song sings of the mine closures and the unemployed workers who consequently had no choice but to leave their homes and take the ferry one last time.

In the 1960s, Wabana quickly developed a desolate atmosphere due to the many empty houses, boarded-up commercial buildings and massive unemployment. In the first decade since the closure, the provincial government also further encouraged people to leave by giving any family that permanently relocated an amount of 1,500 Canadian dollar. This was part of the Provincial Resettlement Policy which sought to move people away from small, economically weak regions that were expensive to provide basic infrastructure. The provincial government then sold outdated homes for $1 apiece to anyone willing to demolish them for firewood. In contrast, the houses in good condition were used in some instances to temporarily house people living on benefits.

From the 1970s, the declining demographic trend slowed down, although it continued uninterruptedly in the following decades. Decades after the closures, the negative economic impact continues to be felt. In addition, the collapse of the Atlantic northwest cod fishery in 1992 was an additional blow to the Bell Island fishing industry. In the 21st century, the population count is still significantly lower in every five-year census compared to the previous one. Mainly because of the limited job possibilities, more people are leaving than there are moving towards the island. Above all there is also a large aging population, which means that there are far more deaths than births. Its proximity and fairly easy accessibility to the capital is one of the main reasons why the island still has a relatively high population and has not become one of Newfoundland's numerous ghost towns.

=== 21st century ===
The very outdated network of waterworks on the island was in such a bad state that since 2002 there has been an official guideline to boil the tap water for consumption. The tap water in some parts of Wabana takes on a yellow, brown or even black colour at times, often contains silt and leaves stains on clothing, tableware and in bathtubs. In 2022, only limited repairs have been carried out as there is only very little budget available for repairs. Since 2014 there has been a water treatment station, partly financed by the province, where every day between 200 and 500 inhabitants go with bottles and jars to get clean water. In 2015 and 2019, residents complained about the situation in the press. A similar issue occurs in dozens of other small and remote communities in Newfoundland and Labrador, affecting a total of 10% of the provincial population in 2022.

In 2006–2007, divers led by Steve Lewis of The Explorers Club explored and documented the flooded mine tunnels of Wabana. On February 4, 2007, American expedition member Joe Steffen died of an air embolism. The divers continued the project despite the loss of a colleague. In addition to providing historically interesting information and photos, they also built 2 km line, making future diving missions easier. In 2016, as part of historical research, including the creation of a visual archive, a new diving mission took place in parts of the more than 100 km of flooded mine tunnels. The Royal Canadian Geographical Society named it "Expedition of the Year".

In 2011, some volunteers started a radio project that lasted one week. Funds were then raised to establish a permanent radio station. On November 5, 2012, the Canadian Radio-television and Telecommunications Commission granted a licence to Radio Bell Island. The broadcasts started on January 28, 2013, and since then the island again has its own radio station.

The island has been somewhat politically infamous since the 2010s because of a longstanding feud between various local politicians and other locally well-known figures and their entourages. Over the years, there have been calls for an audit and allegations of alleged conflict of interest, mismanagement and defamation from various sides. Among other things, a fight about the distribution of bingo income caused a lot of commotion in 2016. The political turmoil has been discussed several times in the provincial press and at the end of 2017 Bell Island even made the national press. In 2018, the mayor of Wabana did a call to unity.

On April 23, 2019, a huge section of a northern cliff plunged down. This caused a huge bang and accompanying shock wave that could be heard and felt in several places along Conception Bay (and was initially reminiscent of the Bell Island Boom).

In the summer of 2019, divers from the Royal Canadian Navy undertook a salvage operation to retrieve unexploded explosives from the WWII shipwrecks off the coast of Bell Island. They then detonated the bombs on the Newfoundland mainland in a controlled manner. In 2021, the Navy completed the work by also clearing the firearms on board the ships as well as ammunition fired from the coastal battery. As two years earlier, the bombs were defused on land so as not to damage marine life and the touristic and historically important wrecks.

In October 2021, during the corona pandemic, the provincial government announced that Bell Island had the lowest vaccination rate in Newfoundland and Labrador. Only 66% of those eligible had vaccinated against COVID-19, compared to a provincial vaccination rate of 82% at the time. Gary Gosine, the mayor of Wabana, pointed to vaccination skepticism as one of the causes. Member of the House of Assembly David Brazil also pointed out that many residents leave early in the morning by ferry to St. John's and return late at night, making it more difficult for them to present themselves at a vaccination centre than elsewhere. Eastern Health, the Eastern Newfoundland health authority at the time, then decided to bring a mobile vaccination unit to the island.

During the same period, two of the three doctors on the island retired, with the last remaining doctor to retire in December 2021. This sparked a fear among the largely ageing population that there was no medical care would be more on the island except for one nurse at the local emergency room. After a charm offensive and accompanying Facebook campaign in the style of the movie The Grand Seduction, residents convinced one of the departed doctors to come back to the island in March 2022 (albeit on a contract of only 11 weeks). At the end of June 2022, Bell Island was again left without a doctor.

In the 21st century, some opinion makers and politicians suggested building a bridge or tunnel from Newfoundland to Bell Island.

== Geography ==
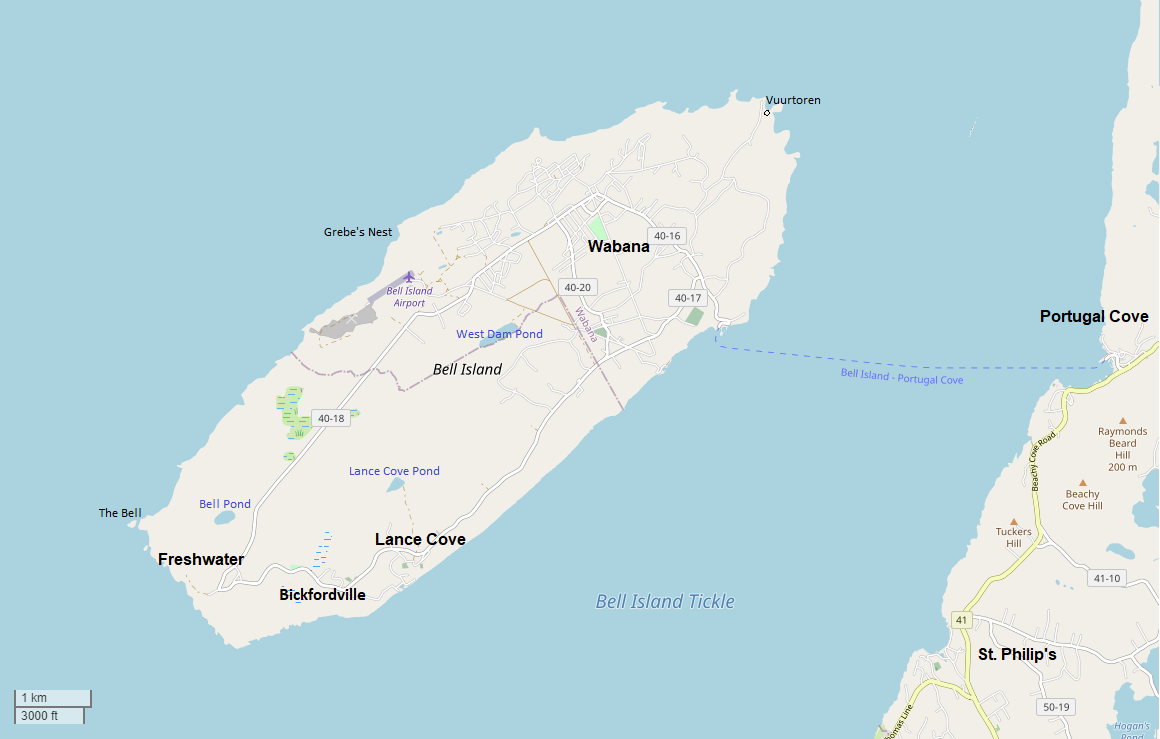
Map of Bell Island

Bell Island is 9.5 kilometres (5.9 mi) long and on average 3 kilometres (1.9 mi) wide, which gives it a slightly elongated shape along the southwest–northeast axis. It is located in the eastern part of Conception Bay, 38 kilometres (24 mi) off the coast of the eastern section of the Avalon Peninsula.

The municipality of Wabana in the north is the de facto capital of the island. It houses the ferry terminal, a supermarket, a gas station and the local clinic. In addition to Wabana centre, the municipality consists of three more neighbourhoods, namely West Mines to the west, The Green to the north and The Front (or Bell Island Front) to the southeast, near the ferry terminal. The Front gets its name from being on the side of the capital; the other side of the island is sometimes known as "The Back". In the unincorporated south of the island there are three more hamlets, namely Lance Cove, Bickfordville and Freshwater.

The nearest place on Newfoundland's "mainland" is Portugal Cove. That village is part of the municipality of Portugal Cove-St. Philip's, which is a de facto suburb of the provincial capital St. John's. Downtown St. John's is about 19 kilometres (12 mi) southeast of the island. The strait between Bell Island and Portugal Cove-St. Philip's is known as the Bell Island Tickle or popularly simply as "The Tickle". (Note: A tickle is a Newfoundland English term which means "narrow strait". (Roseman and Royal, p. 77.)) The shortest distance between Bell Island and the western side of Conception Bay is 11 kilometres (6.8 mi), namely between The Bell on the one hand and the promontory of the Port de Grave peninsula on the other hand. About 3 kilometres (1.9 mi) south of Bell Island lies the uninhabited Little Bell Island. That island, like the even further south Kellys Island, is clearly visible from Bell Island.

The coast is very rocky and consists almost entirely of steep cliffs tens of meters high that tower up to 45 kilometres (28 mi) above sea level. The island, which continues to gain in altitude especially close to the coastline, reaches a maximum height of 148 metres (486 ft). Because the central part of the island is relatively flat compared to the coast, seen from the sea it has a somewhat table mountain-like view. Since the island is so high above sea level, on a clear day there are excellent views of the Newfoundland mainland from either side. The cliffs are home to several sea caves and natural bridges and in several places overlook large rocks and sea stacks. Known are The Bell, Coadys Island and The Clapper, all on the southwest coast. There is also a ravine on the east coast that is known as The Scrape. The Front and Lance Cove are almost the only places where the coast is less steep and where you can land from the sea. To the north are Redmans Head and Eastern Head, two prominent capes between which a lighthouse has been built.

Especially between Bell Island and Little Bell Island, the waters are treacherous for shipping. This is partly due to a rock located at a depth of only 4.6 metres (15 ft) and the presence of several shipwrecks.

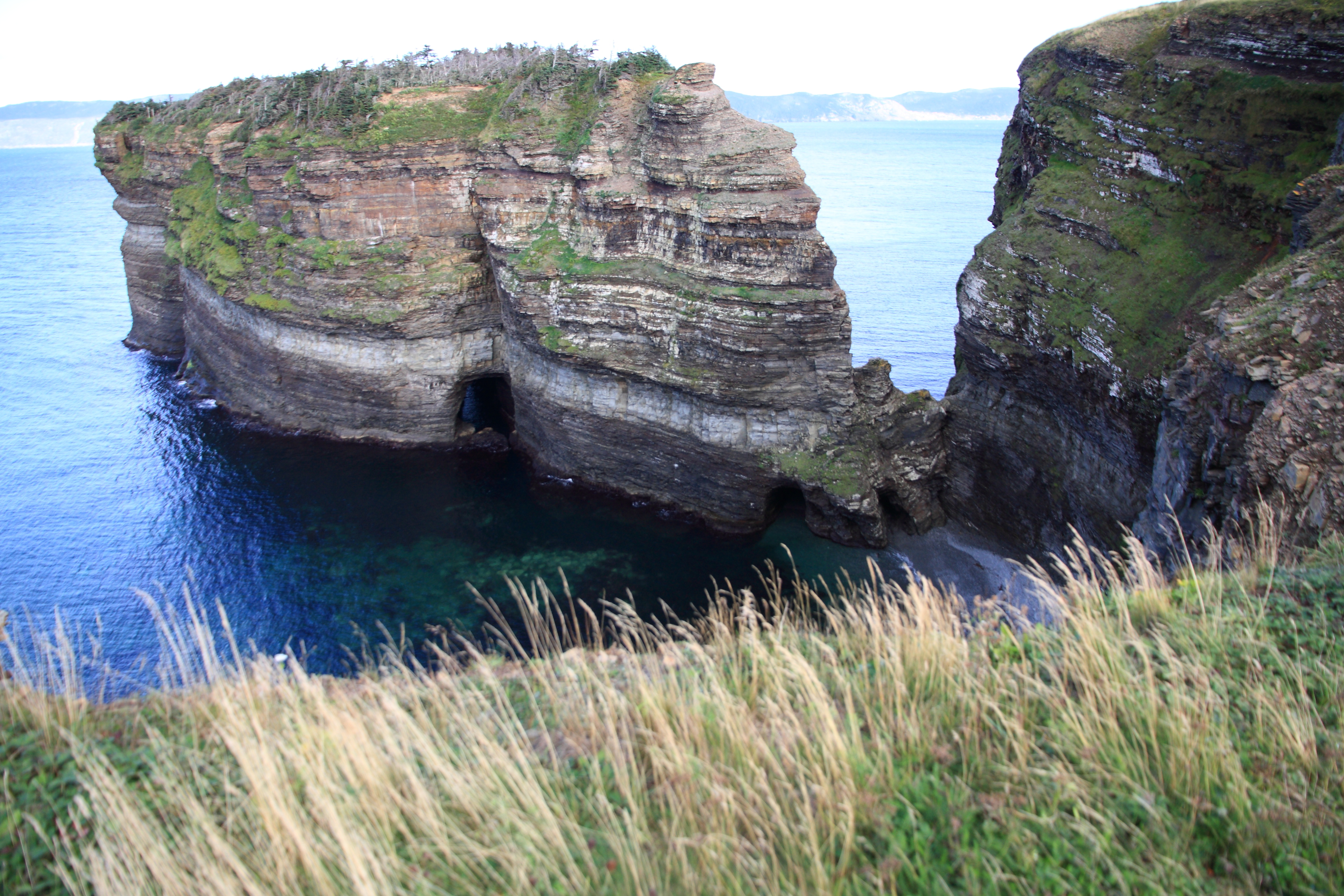
Rock formation with some sea caves

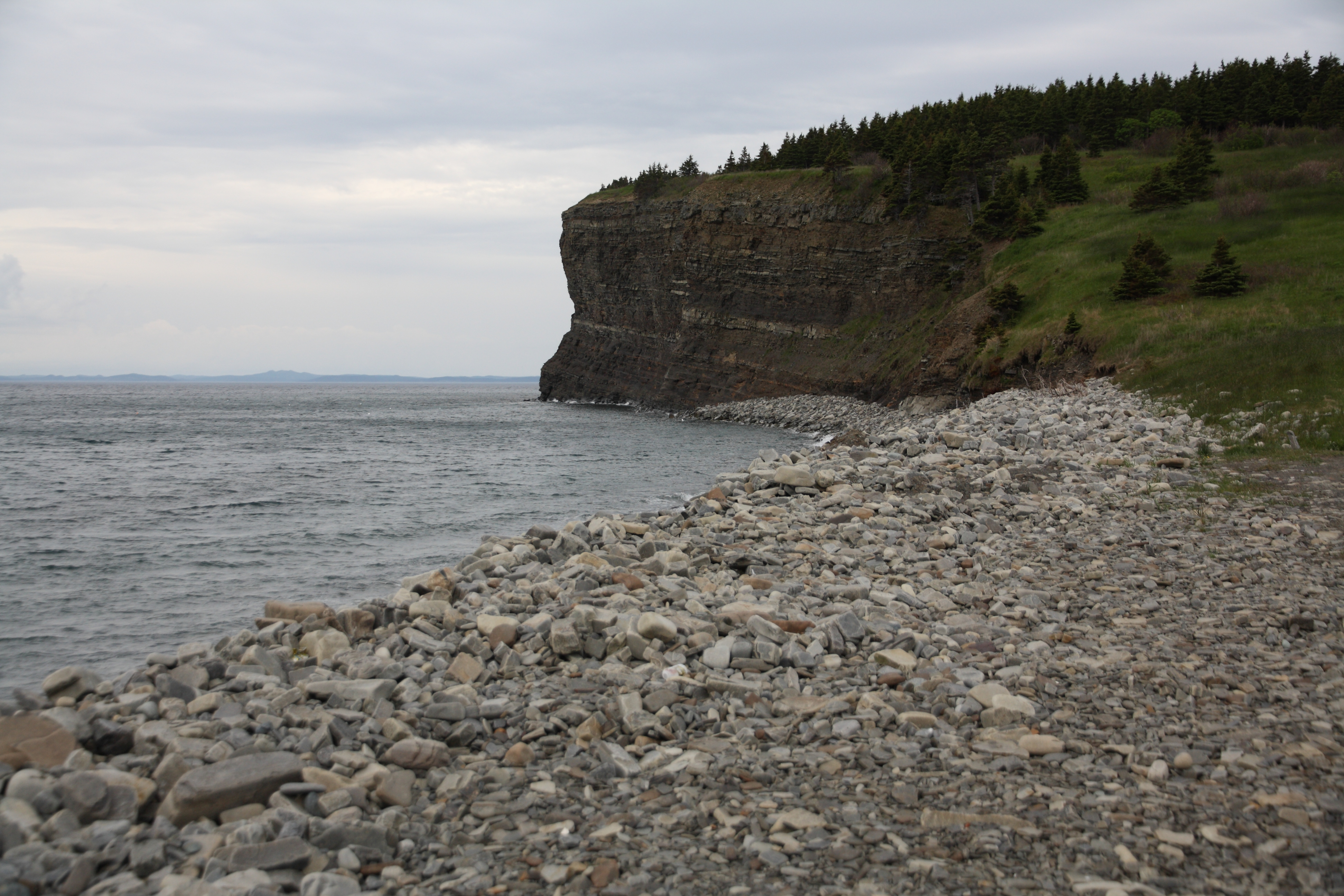
The pebble beach of Lance Cove with a cliff in the background

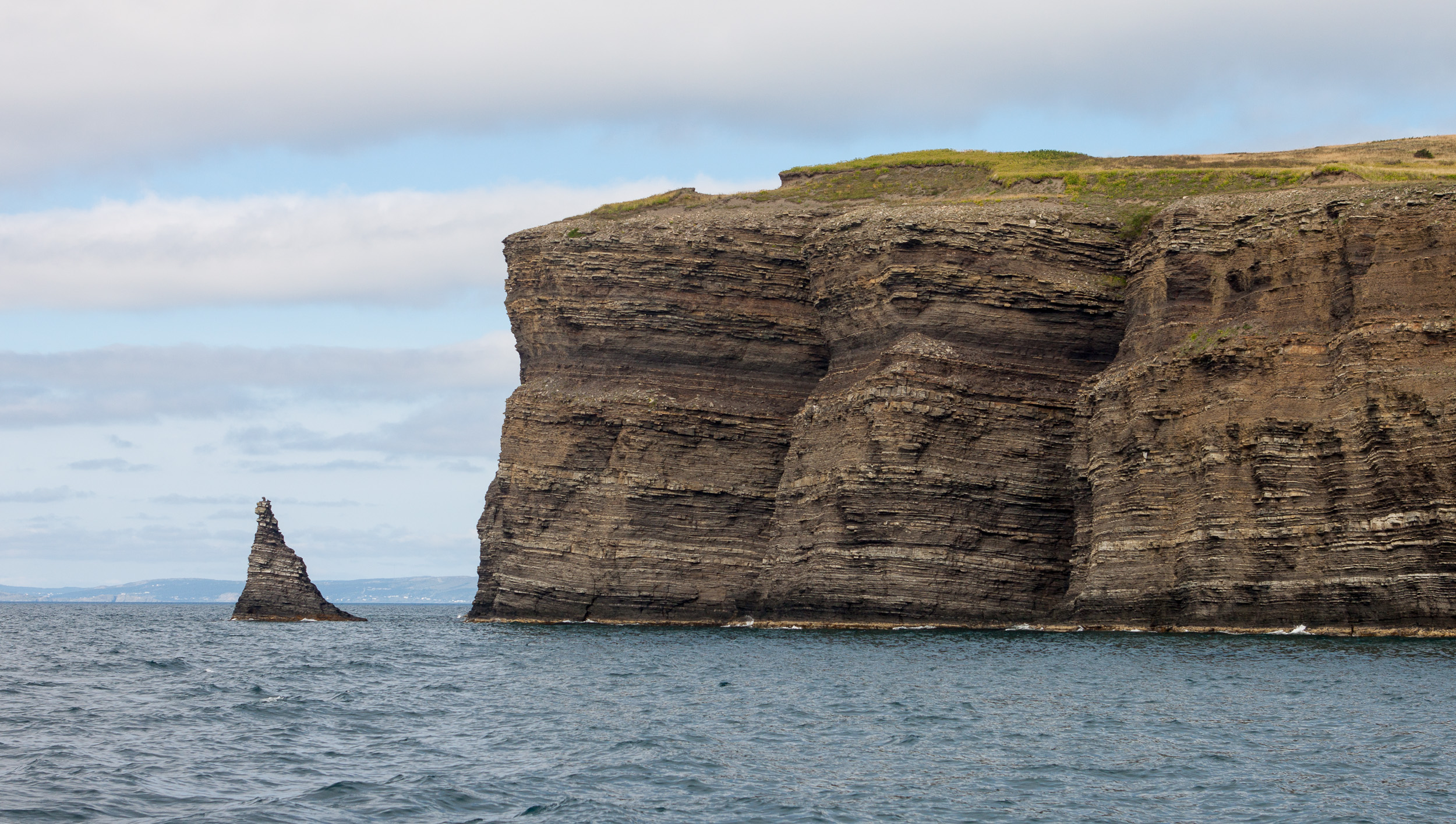
Bell Island's typical steep cliffs

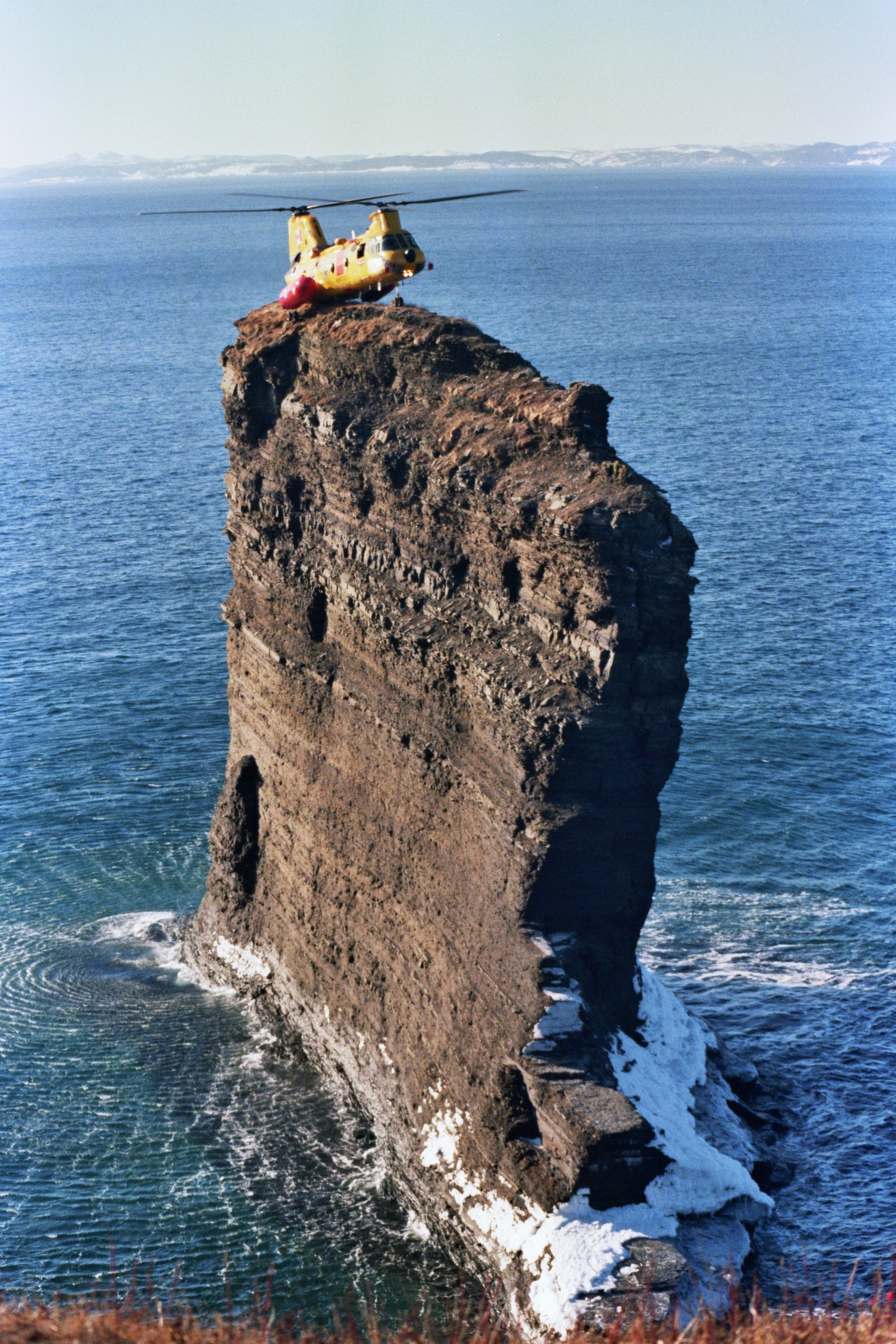
A Boeing Vertol CH-113 Sea Knight made a landing on one of Bell Island's sea stacks, during a training session in 1987

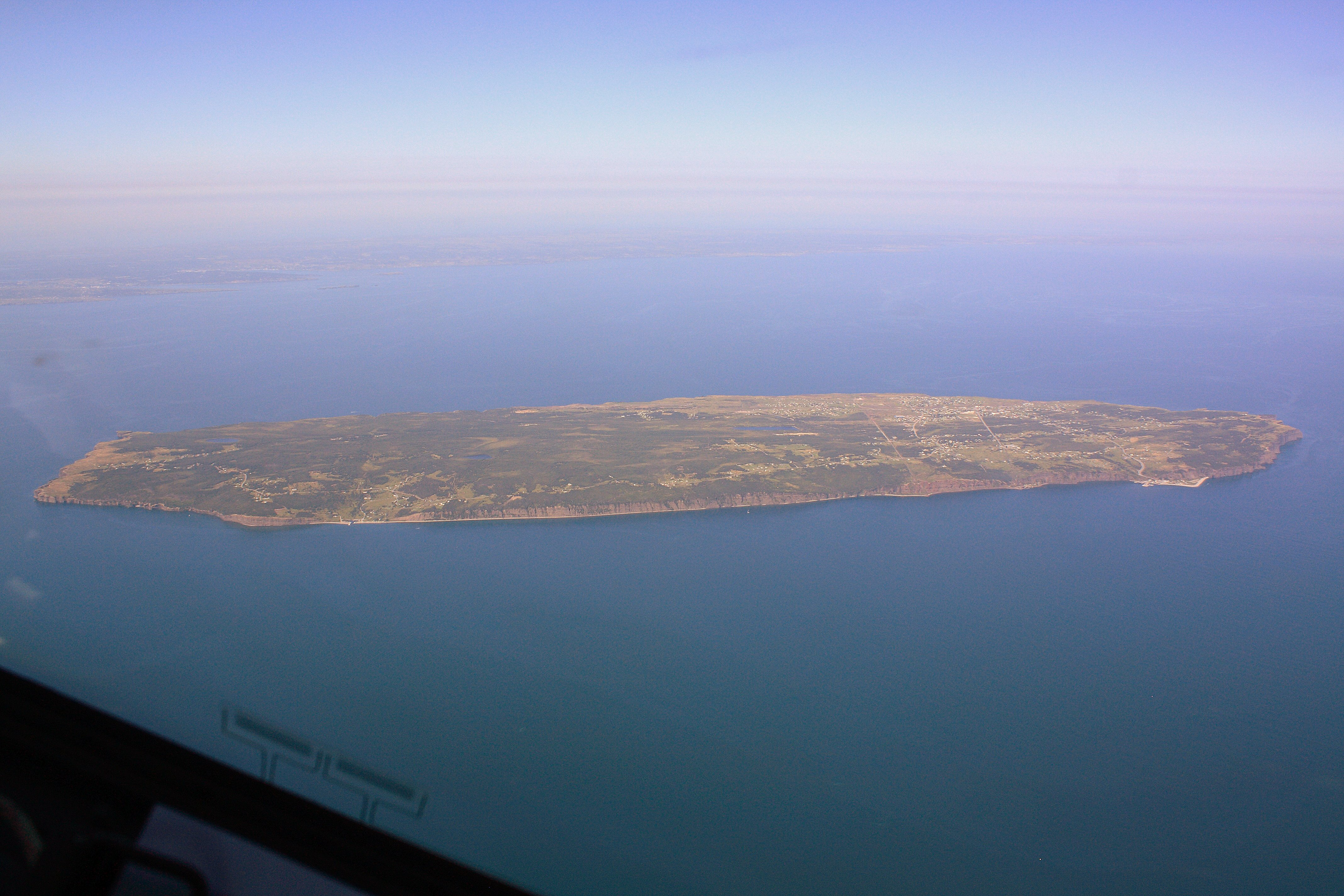
The island seen from the southeast out of an airplane window. The cliffs, the ferry dock and the various settlements and lakes are clearly visible

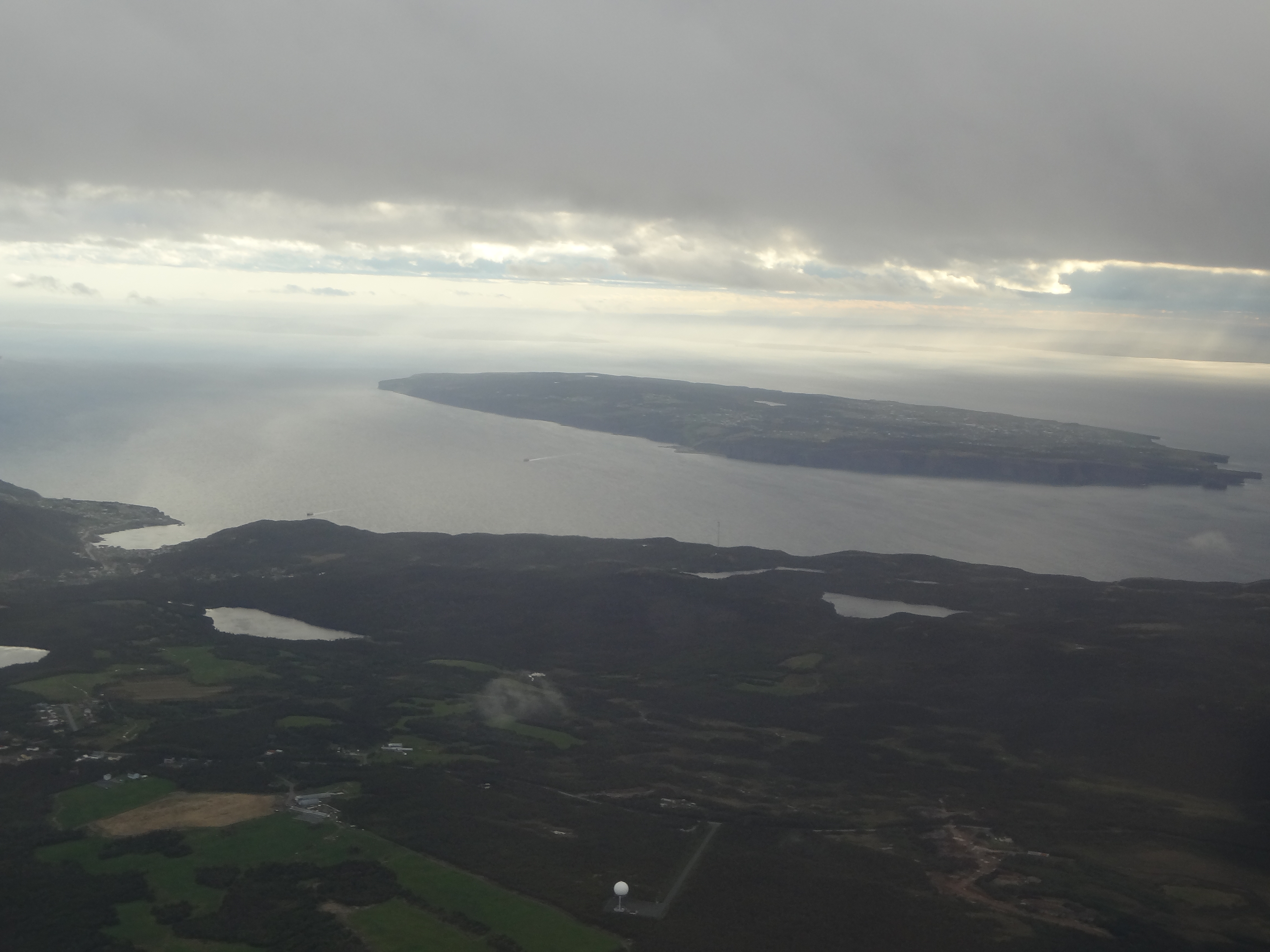
Aerial view from the northeast with a clear view of both The Tickle and Portugal Cove

Cliffs at the northeast tip of Bell Island directly next to the Bell Island Lighthouse. Near Jackmans Cove.

=== Hydrography ===
Bell Island has several soggy areas, including a number of real swamps, with some natural ponds scattered here and there. To the southwest are two relatively small lakes, namely Bell Pond (2.9 ha) and Lance Cove Pond (2.1 ha).

In addition, there is also the centrally located West Dam Pond (6.6 ha). That reservoir was constructed in 1954 by DOSCO at the highest point to have water for industrial applications and firefighting. A second goal was to ensure that more groundwater would remain on the island, so that the inhabitants' wells did not dry up in the summer months. The West Dam Pond has an average depth of 2 m and a maximum depth of 5 m. It drains through the Main Brook, which has a length of 5.5 km, making it the longest brook on the island. There are several other streams, including the Black Brook east of Lance Cove. Due to the combination of a steep coastline and many streams, there are several small waterfalls, such as the so-called Faerie's Waterfall near the old pier.

=== Geology and fossils ===
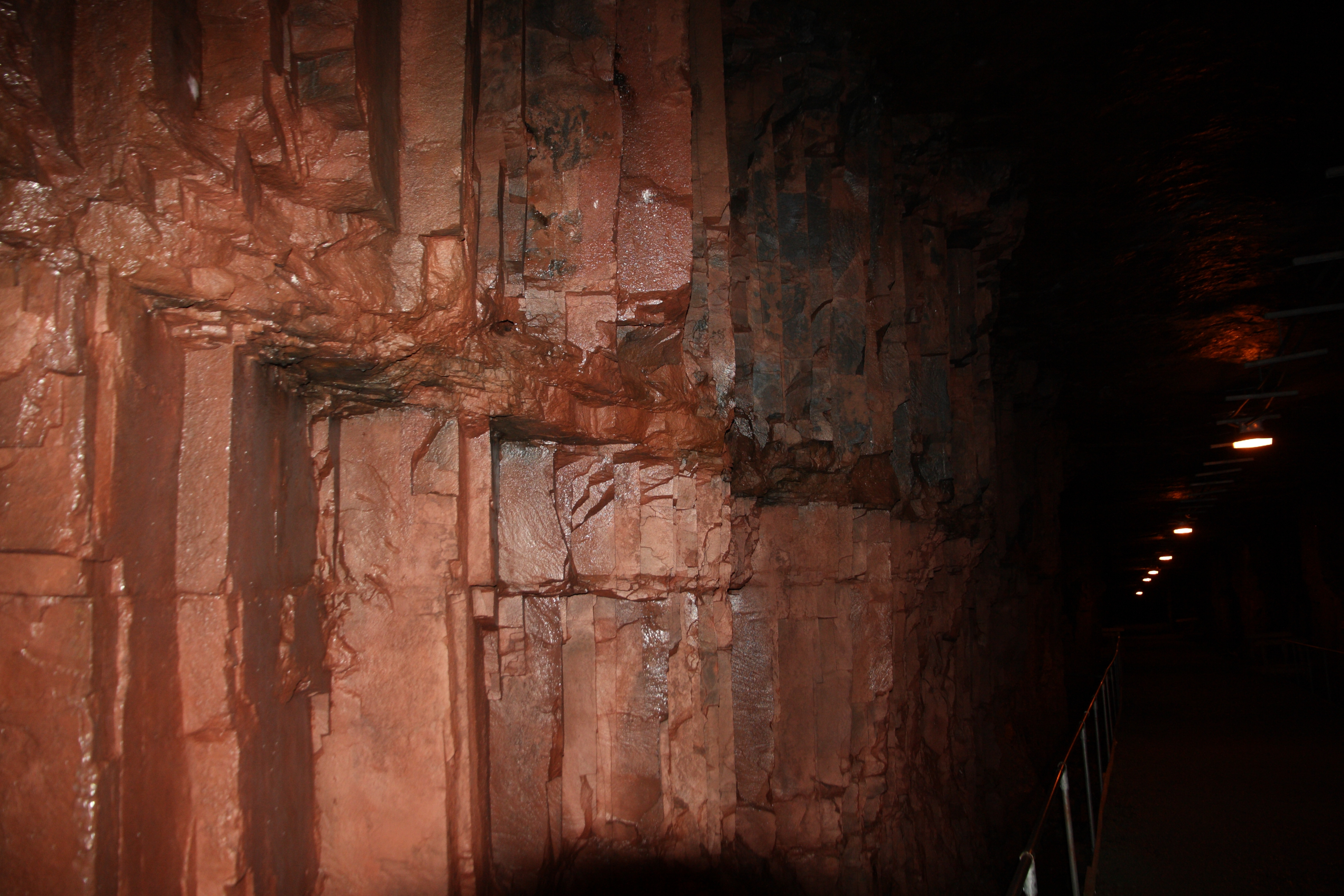
Red-coloured hematite rock in the No. 2 Mine

Bell Island can be characterized geologically as a huge boulder consisting of sandstone and shale rock that towers dozens of meters above the waters of Conception Bay, like a table mountain. The island is therefore an anomaly within the geological context of the Avalon Peninsula, whose soil consists almost exclusively of granite and shale rock and contains no sandstone. The bottom stratigraphically belongs to two groups. The northwest of Bell Island (and the seabed to its north) is part of the Wabana Group. All the rest of the island, including Little Bell Island and Kellys Island, belongs to the Bell Island Group. Both groups are cumulatively divided into eleven different formations, nine of which occur on Bell Island itself. (Note: From northwest to southeast, it concerns the Gravel Head, Gull Island, Grebes Nest Point, Scotia and Powers Steps formation within the Wabana Group; and the Dominion, Ochre Cove, Redmans and Beach formation in the Bell Island Group.)

The rock of the Bell Island Group consists of red-brown to glimmer-like gray sandstone and siltstone in which beds of oolitic hematite are embedded. The overlying Wabana Group consists of black shale and sandstone with layers of phosphate containing pebbles, oolitic hematite and pyrite. Hematite, an iron-ore containing mineral, is so abundant on the island (and especially in the Wabana Group) that Bell Island has one of the highest concentrations of that mineral in the world. The hematite causes the rock to have a red to reddish-brown colour in many places.

The iron ore rock is about 470 to 485 million years old and dates from the Early Ordovician. The Bell Island Group however contains on the surface in some places rock layers that are several tens of millions of years older. That group is after all Cambro-Ordovician and even contains to a limited extent rock from the even older Ediacaran. In the rock layers fossils of, among others, microbial mats, Rangeomorpha, trilobites and arthropods can be found, albeit in limited extent. This always concerns marine life, since the aforementioned rock layers were part of the bed of the northern Rheic Ocean (near the coast of the paleocontinent Avalonia).

The Cambrian layers of the island are especially interesting for paleontologists. In contrast to the limited number of fossilized animals, there are an exceptionally large number of trace fossils. These are fossilized traces of biological activity (such as step, crawl or digging traces). Especially Cruziana trace fossils are very numerous. This makes Bell Island a globally unique location for the study of the Cambrian substrate revolution, one of the most important events in the history of life. (Note: The "Cambrian Substrate Revolution" refers to the transition from a nearly anoxic seabed lined with microbial mats and limited animal digging to more extensive vertical digging, oxygenation of the subsoil and the evolution of the animal-dominated seabed we know today.) The Early Ordovician strata are also rich in trace fossils; notably Cruziana and Trichophycus, as well as a single example of Arthrophycus. These finds show a clear resemblance to similarly old layers in Western Europe and Morocco.

Map of eastern Newfoundland showing the Bell Island Group (click to enlarge)

Map of eastern Newfoundland showing the Wabana Group (click to enlarge)

=== Climate ===
According to the Köppen climate classification Bell Island has a Dfb-type climate. That equates to a temperate continental climate with warm summers and about the same amount of precipitation in each season. In a Dfb climate, the warmest month of the year has an average monthly temperature of less than 22 °C (72 °F), while the coldest month has an average monthly temperature below 0 °C (32 °F). At least four months have average monthly temperatures above 10 °C. For comparison: in Europe cities like Warsaw, Riga and Kyiv have the same climate type.

The island has an average annual rainfall of 125 centimetres (49 in), well above the Canadian average. It is unprotected from Conception Bay's winds. In summer it is mainly south-westerly winds and in winter mostly westerly or south-westerly winds. In winter the winds are at their strongest and there are regular storms with snow and sleet. In cold winters, the surrounding water can sometimes become unnavigable due to ice conditions.

=== Fauna and flora ===
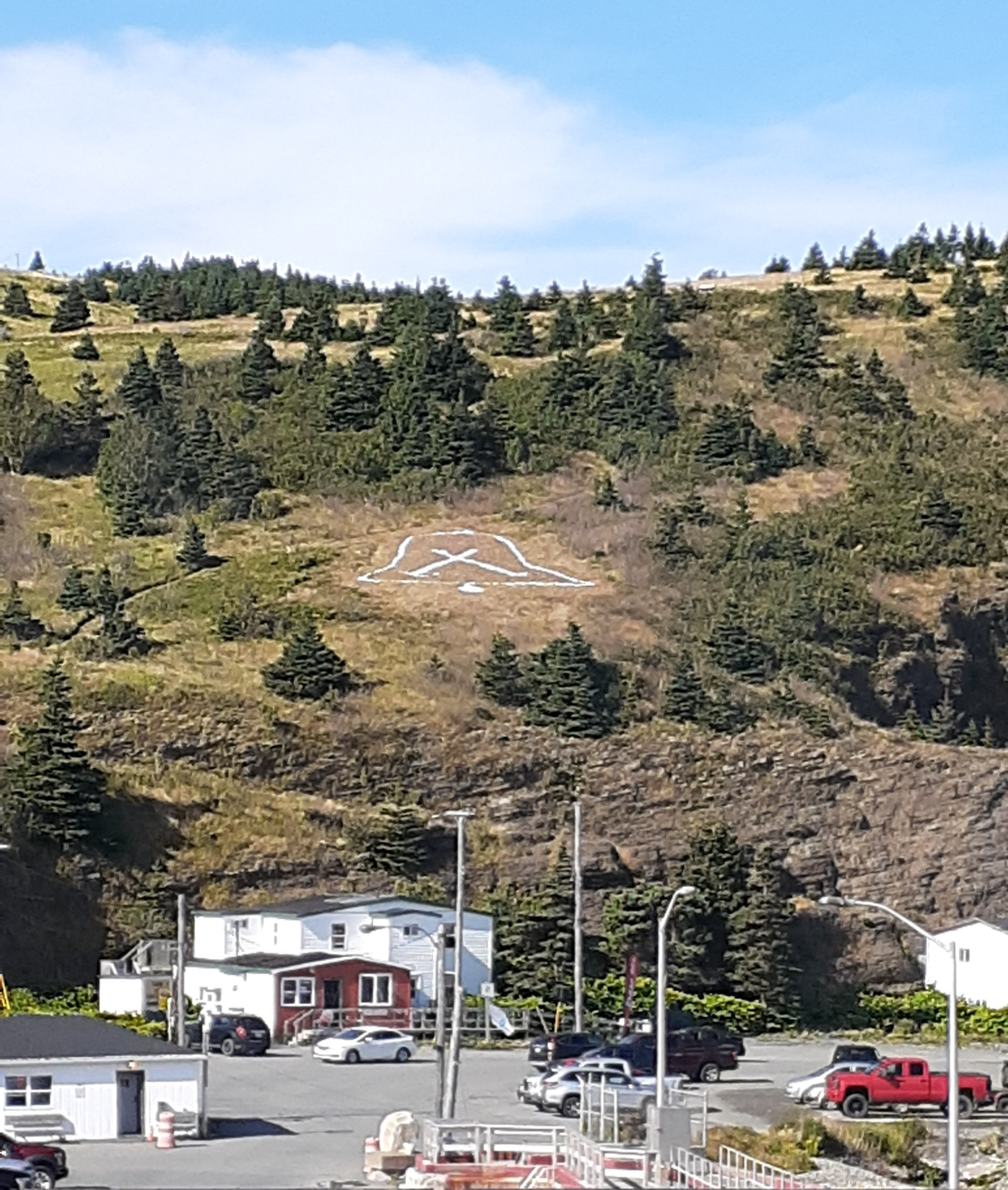
Beach Hill, just behind the ferry dock, consists of an alternation of grasses and conifers

==== Fauna ====
Bell Island's cliffs are ideal as a safe breeding site for a variety of seabird species. Black guillemots are particularly abundant during the breeding season along the Bell Island coast, including near the ferry dock and lighthouse. There are also several seabird species that are found throughout the year on and around the island. These include great black-backed gull, which breed annually on the south coast and near The Bell. Also several species within the family of sandpipers live on the island.

However, Bell Island also provides a home to typical land birds. In and around the rural parts and grasslands of the island, in addition to many different sparrow species, there are also falcons, including the merlin. The south for a large part consists of woodlands. American robins, evening grosbeaks and woodpeckers live there. The northern rock formation Grebe's Nest also has a large breeding ground for starlings.

Various marine mammals can also be found in the waters around the island, including seals and baleen whales (such as humpback whales and common minke whales). Especially in the summer months when there are large schools of capelin in Conception Bay, whales are often there as they feed on these fish. Commercially interesting species found in the waters around the island are cod, squids and bluefin tuna.

The shipwrecks around the island are home to lumpfish, jellyfish, corals, sea anemones, sponges, sea angels, Majidae and many other species of fish and crustaceans. The rock formations along the coast are home to starfish, sea urchins, sponges, eelpouts and flatfish.

==== Flora ====
Bell Island's grasslands and swamps are home to a rich variety of plants. It concerns, among others, various perennials such as compact rush, slender rush, bog rush, common cinquefoil, Conioselinum chinense, grassleaf speedwell, lupines and common hop. There are also perennials such as downy willowherb and annual flowering plants such as narrow-leaved vetch and smooth vetch.

The coniferous forests mainly consist of fir trees. These trees also grow in limited density in the parts of the island that transition from forest to grassland. In addition to coniferous trees, many shrubs grow in the forests, which bear berries edible for humans. These include the purple chokeberry, wild strawberries and some species of blueberries and gooseberries.

== Demographics ==
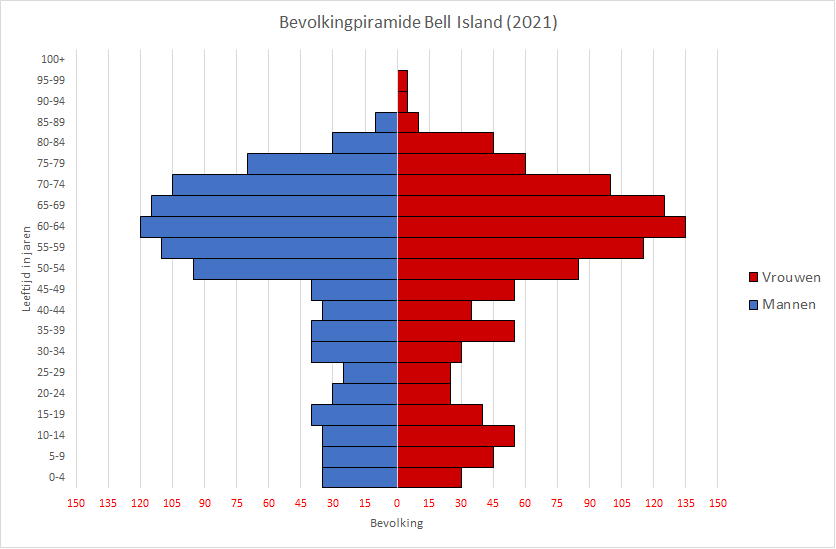
Population pyramid of Bell Island (2021). Men are shown in blue and women in red.

Bell Island is known to the federal government agency Statistics Canada as "Division No. 1, Subdivision R". (Note: Division No. 1, Subdivision R corresponds to the sum of the data of the town of Wabana on the one hand and that of "Division No. 1, Subd. R (Subdivision of Unorganized)", on the other hand. That unincorporated area currently – but not historically – completely coincides with the DPL Lance Cove.) According to the census of 2021, the municipality of Wabana has 1,815 inhabitants, or more than 87% of the total population. That same year, the unincorporated south of Bell Island had only 264 inhabitants. In total there were about 1000 men (48.1%) compared to about 1080 women (51.9%). (Note: The number of men and women together amounts to 2,080 instead of the established population of 2,079. The small discrepancy arises from the fact that Statistics Canada rounds this data to the nearest multiple of five.)

In 2021, the island had 1,374 homes, of which 1,095 were (permanently) inhabited. The 2,079 inhabitants therefore lived on average in a household consisting of 1.9 people. This number is relatively low due to the fact that the island has 455 one-person households. The 1,095 inhabited houses consisted of 925 detached houses, 60 semi-detached buildings, 10 row houses, 95 apartments and flats (of which 80 in a duplex) and 5 movable houses. The unincorporated south consisted almost exclusively of detached houses.

The population of the island, as in most parts of the province, has as strongly ageing population. Besides a natural process of aging, due to the few jobs and relative remoteness, there is also a large emigration of people of working age that is not compensated by immigration. Because of this, Bell Island's population pyramid has a remarkable shape that is similar to a mushroom. In 2021, no less than 1,305 Bell Islanders were age 50 or older, or nearly 63%. The median age was 56.8 years in Wabana and 62.0 years in the south, compared to a Canadian average of 41.6 years.

The population percentage living in a low-income family in 2020 was 41.4% in Wabana and 36.5% in the south, compared to a national rate of 11.1%. While in 2020 only 17.8% of Canadian families lived (partly) on an income provided by the government (such as a pension, unemployment benefit or sickness benefit), it was the case for nearly half of the families of Bell Island that same year.

=== Demographic development ===
In the decades before the start of mining (1845–1891), the island population grew very steadily with an average of about 8 net inhabitants per year. In the seventy years that followed, the annual average growth was more than 20 times faster. Between 1961 and 2021, the population decreased from 12,281 to 2,079. This amounts to a decrease of 10,202 inhabitants (-83.1%) in 60 years. The population in 2021 is the lowest in more than 110 years.

Year	Population
1706	85
1794	87
1845	338
1857	428
1869	504
1874	576
1884	651
1891	709

Year	Population
1901	1,320
1911	3,084
1921	4,357
1935	6,157
1945	8,171
1951	10,291
1956	11,724
1961	12,281

Year	Population
1966	9,090
1971	6,079
1976	5,446
1981	4,929
1986	4,612
1991	4,185
1996	3,596
2001	3,078

Year	Population
2006	2,784
2011	2,690
2016	2,468
2021	2,079

=== Language ===
According to the 2016 census, virtually all residents of Bell Island had the English language as mother tongue (and everyone spoke that language). Only about fifteen people had a different mother tongue. These included five Franco-Newfoundlanders, the province's French-speaking minority.

The vast majority of Bell Islanders did not speak any other language besides English in 2016. A total of 30 people (1.2%) were able to speak French – which is an official language in Canada like English. The most well-known unofficial languages in 2016 were Arabic and Greek; both languages were known by about 10 islanders. (Note: Statistics Canada collects data on the knowledge of non-official languages from a sample of 25% of the population per locality (excluding native speakers). The total estimated numbers are then rounded to the nearest multiple of five.)

=== Ethnicity ===
The population of Bell Island consists almost exclusively of whites. In 2016 there were also ten people who indicated that they had an indigenous identity. All of them were Métis. That year there was a total of about 50 people who were ethnically partly white and partly of indigenous descent, thus the majority among them regarded themselves as white rather than indigenous. About ten Arabs were the only visible minority on the island in 2016. (Note: By a visible minority, Statistics Canada means people who are neither white nor indigenous.) (Note: Statistics Canada collects data on visible minorities from a sample of 25% of the population per locality. The total estimated numbers are then rounded to the nearest multiple of five.)

== Government and facilities ==
=== Administrative division ===
==== Supralocal government ====
Since Canada is a federal state, much of the administrative power rests with the provincial administration, as does the determination of the supralocal administrative division. Newfoundland and Labrador as a Canadian province is an exception as it has no level of government between the local and provincial levels. (Note: For example, Quebec has regional county municipalities and Nova Scotia has counties.)

On the island of Newfoundland, there is a very limited form of regional government through the regional service boards. However, they are not a full-fledged level of government per se, but rather a public entity resembling an inter-municipal cooperation. Bell Island has been part of the Eastern Regional Service Board since 2008. That RSB has the processing of garbage and wastewater, the management of drinking water and the organization of the fire brigade as its competences.

==== Local government ====
On a local level, the Wabana mining village has been officially recognized as a town since 1950. However, a large part of the buildings on the outer edge of the northern mining village fell outside the municipal boundaries. In 1965 Wabana annexed part of the unincorporated territory and the then approximately 3000 inhabitants living in that area. Since then, the municipal territory roughly encompasses the northern half of Bell Island.

The sparsely populated southern part of the island, where the hamlets of Lance Cove, Bickfordville and Freshwater are located, consists of an unincorporated area. This means that the people in those places do not come under the administration of a municipal government and thus have no municipal services, municipal tax, or property tax.

Lance Cove does have some local government to a limited extent as the place is recognized as a local service district (LSD). That is a local form of government in which a group of (unpaid) elected officials is responsible for facilitating certain basic services to the community. This concerns matters such as the street lighting, the snow removal of local roads, the garbage collection service and maintenance and repairs to the sewers and to the waterworks. However, unlike a municipality, an LSD board cannot make independent decisions without ministerial permission and does not have the right to levy taxes or manage a budget. They can only operate by passing on the costs incurred to the residents via an invoice.

The people who live in Freshwater, Bickfordville, just outside the boundaries of Wabana or in some remote homes have no local government of any kind. The LSD Lance Cove only offers services to that place, not to the entire unincorporated area. The administrative situation on the island is therefore very diffuse, which has already caused problems. For example, on July 1, 2021, the Municipality of Wabana terminated its garbage collection contract with the Eastern Regional Service Board, which also included a provision arranging the collection of garbage in the municipality-free island portion. Wabana declined to have anything to do with this, forcing residents of the south suddenly had to get rid of their waste themselves. In the course of August 2021, a regular waste collection service started again through a local contractor.

=== Facilities ===
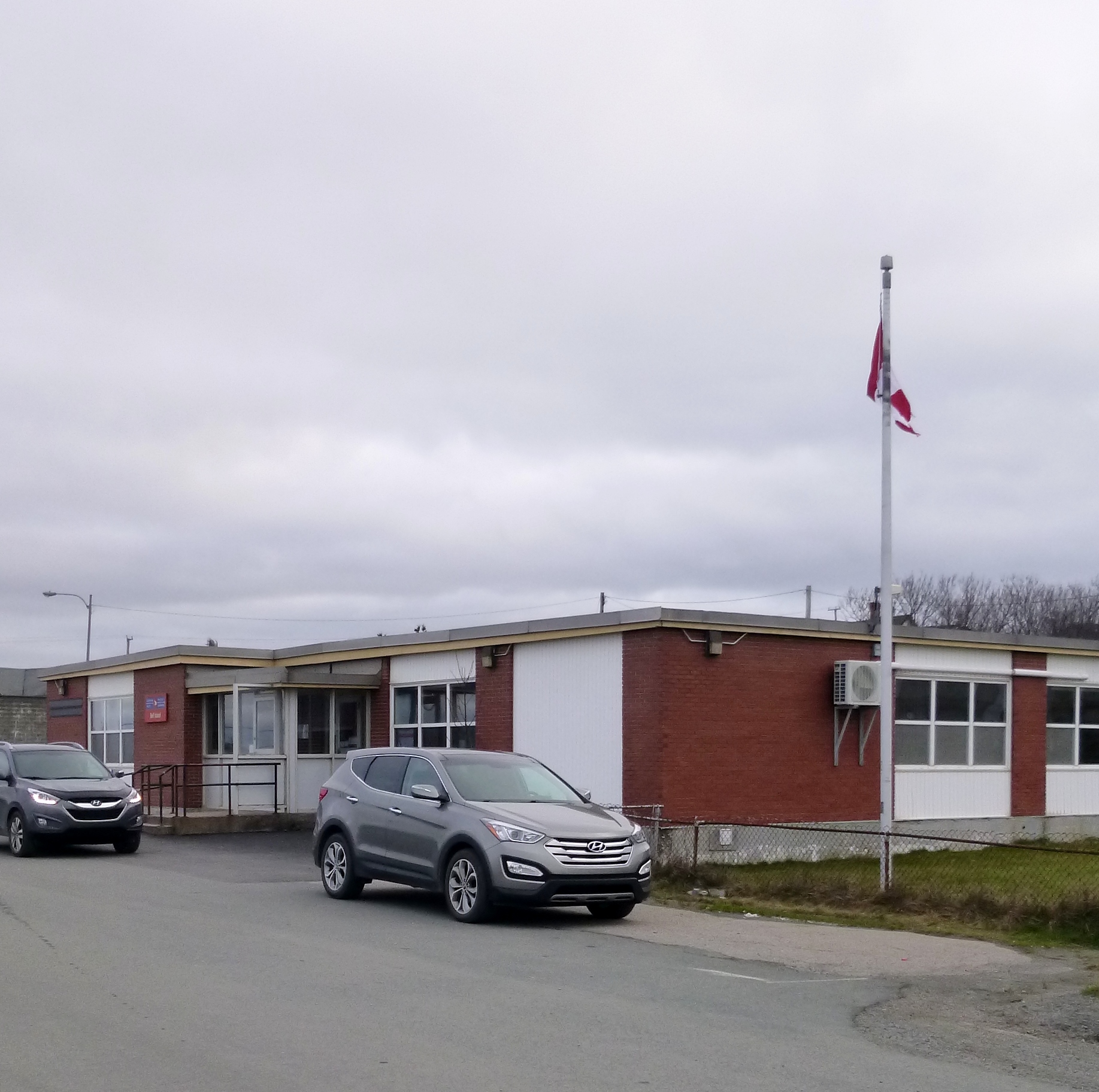
Post office in Wabana

In Wabana there is a fire station as well as a police station of the Royal Canadian Mounted Police. There is also an office of the Royal Canadian Legion, the veterans organization of the Canadian Armed Forces. Wabana also houses the island's post office, a supermarket, a gas station, and several convenience stores. The Bell Island Public Building was established in 1942 and currently houses the public library and child protection offices.

The municipality also houses two Bell Island schools, St. Augustine's Elementary School and St. Michael's Regional High School. Children can therefore attend both primary and secondary education locally. Until the end of the 20th century, there was also a school where students could receive a vocational education. The former school building is now named the "Wabana Complex" and houses the town council.

Since 1965, Wabana has also houses a small hospital, the Dr. Walter Templeman Health Care Centre. This health care facility (also known as the Bell Island Primary Health-care Clinic) is overseen by the province's Health Authority, NL Health Services. The hospital function has been reduced due to the decline in the population, so that it is now more like an outpatient clinic.

There are three church buildings on Bell Island for the Christian residents. Specifically the Anglican Church of St. Cyprian and St. Mary, the Catholic St. Michael's Church and the Jackson United Church of the Protestant United Church of Canada (which was formerly a Methodistic church). Historically, other Christian denominations also had a place of worship there.

=== Transport infrastructure ===
On the east side of the island, in the territory of the town of Wabana, there is a ferry port. This is the departure and arrival point of the two ferries that make the 20 minute crossing from the island to Portugal Cove and back several times a day. The route utilizes the MV Legionnaire with a capacity of 200 persons and 64 cars and the MV Flanders with a capacity of 240 persons and 36 cars. There are a total of 32 crossings on weekdays (16 in each direction) between 5.30 am and 10.35 pm. On weekends, there are 26 crossings every day (13 in each direction) between 6.50 am and 10.35 pm. Commuters who do not have a car should take a taxi to the city in Portugal Cove as there is no public transport available there. Over the decades, however, the ferry connection has often been called unreliable, sometimes leading to protest and frustration. A berth for cargo ships is also provided.

In addition, just west of the West Mines neighbourhood is a 701 m airstrip known as "Bell Island Airport" (ICAO: CCV4). This tarmac airstrip is usually abandoned as it is only used in very cold winters or in emergencies, when sea ice has blocked the passage of the ferries.

Bell Island also houses a street network, including a loop that largely follows the perimeter of the island via Middleton Avenue and Lance Cove Road, among others. The street plan of the main settlement Wabana somewhat resembles a maze and thus is diametrically opposed to the villages built almost entirely along the coastline that are typical of Newfoundland.

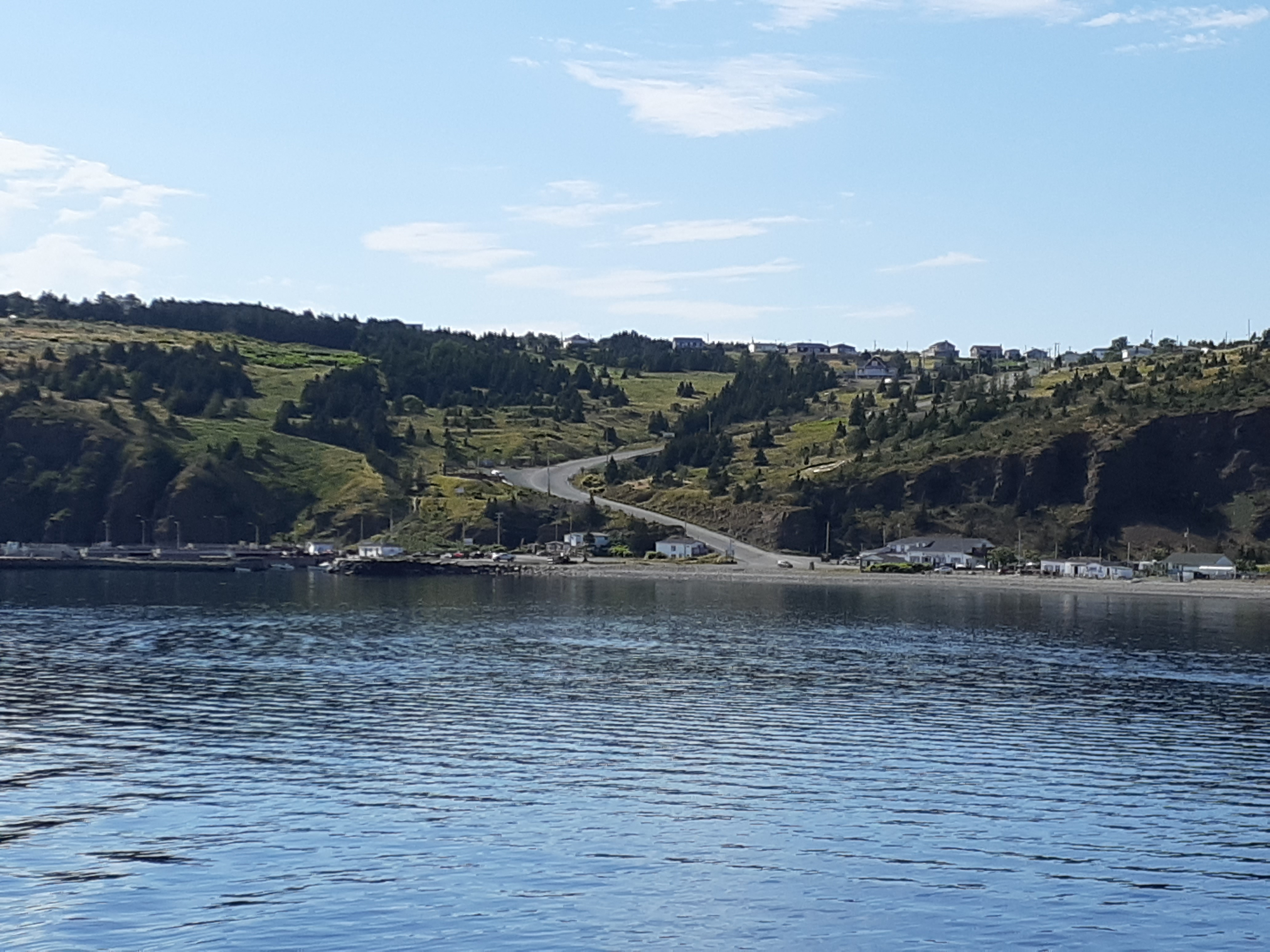
View of Beach Hill, located at "The Front", with the ferry dock on the left

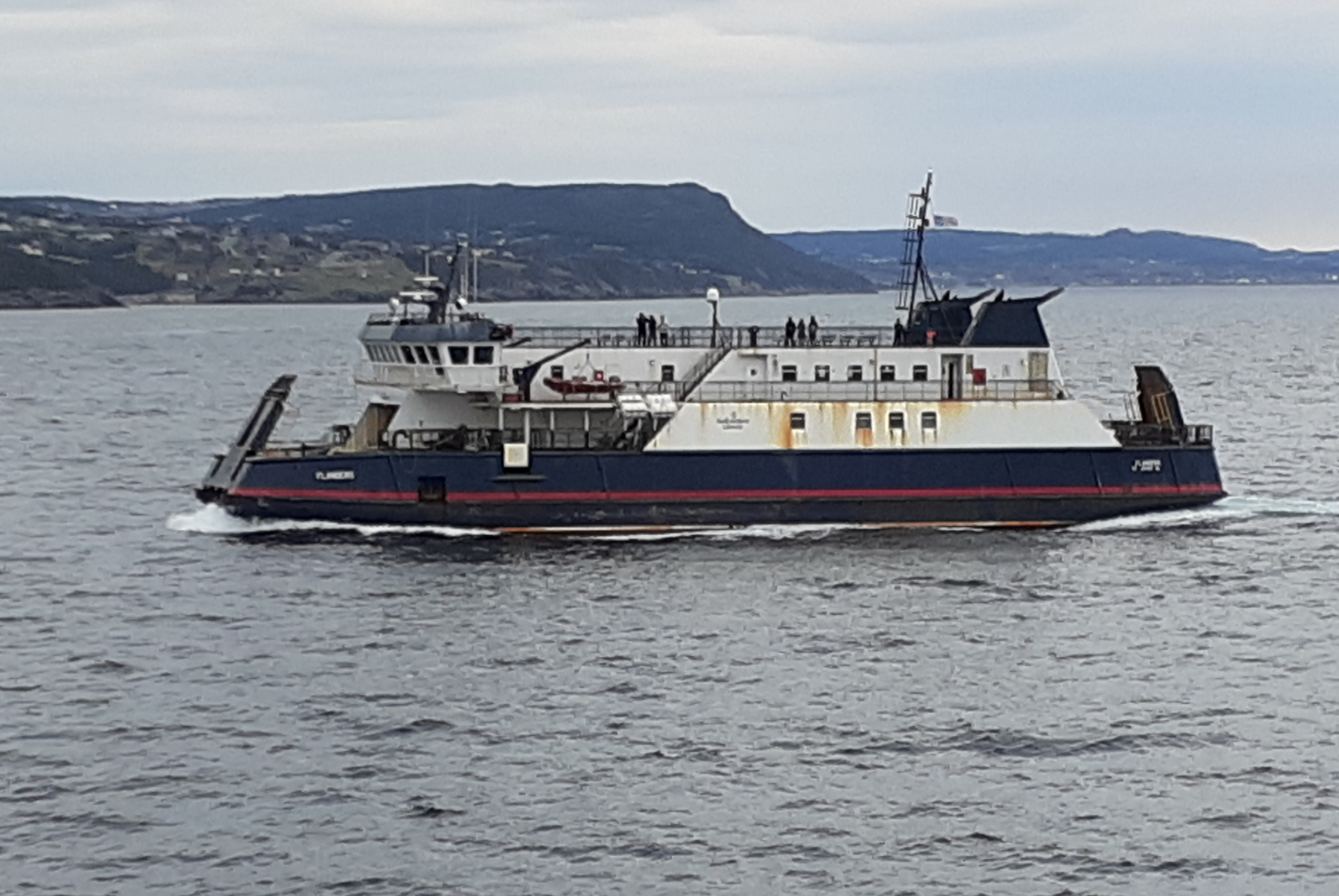
The MV Flanders is one of two ferries that make the daily crossing from Bell Island to Portugal Cove

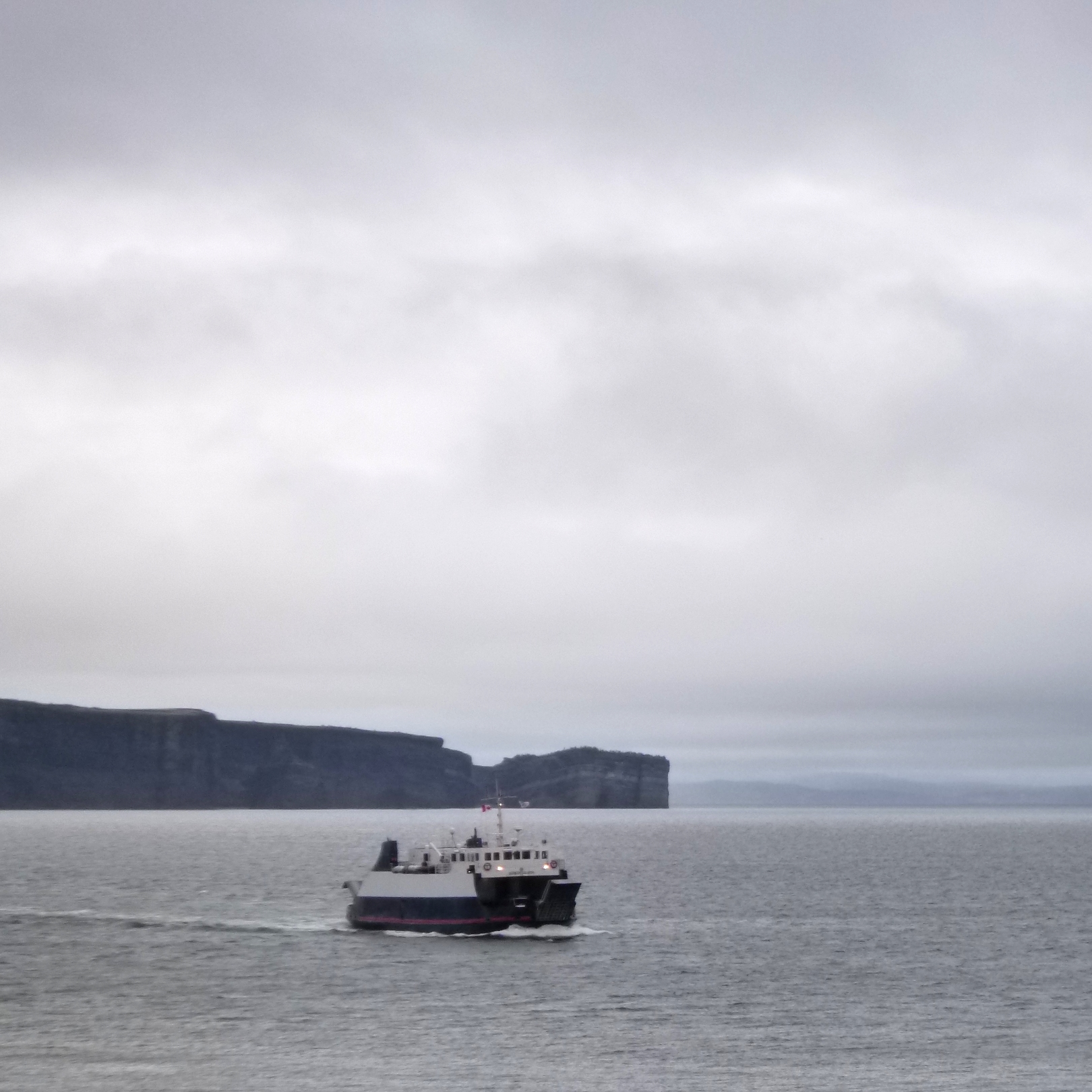
One of the ferries heading to Portugal Cove (with Bell Island in the background)

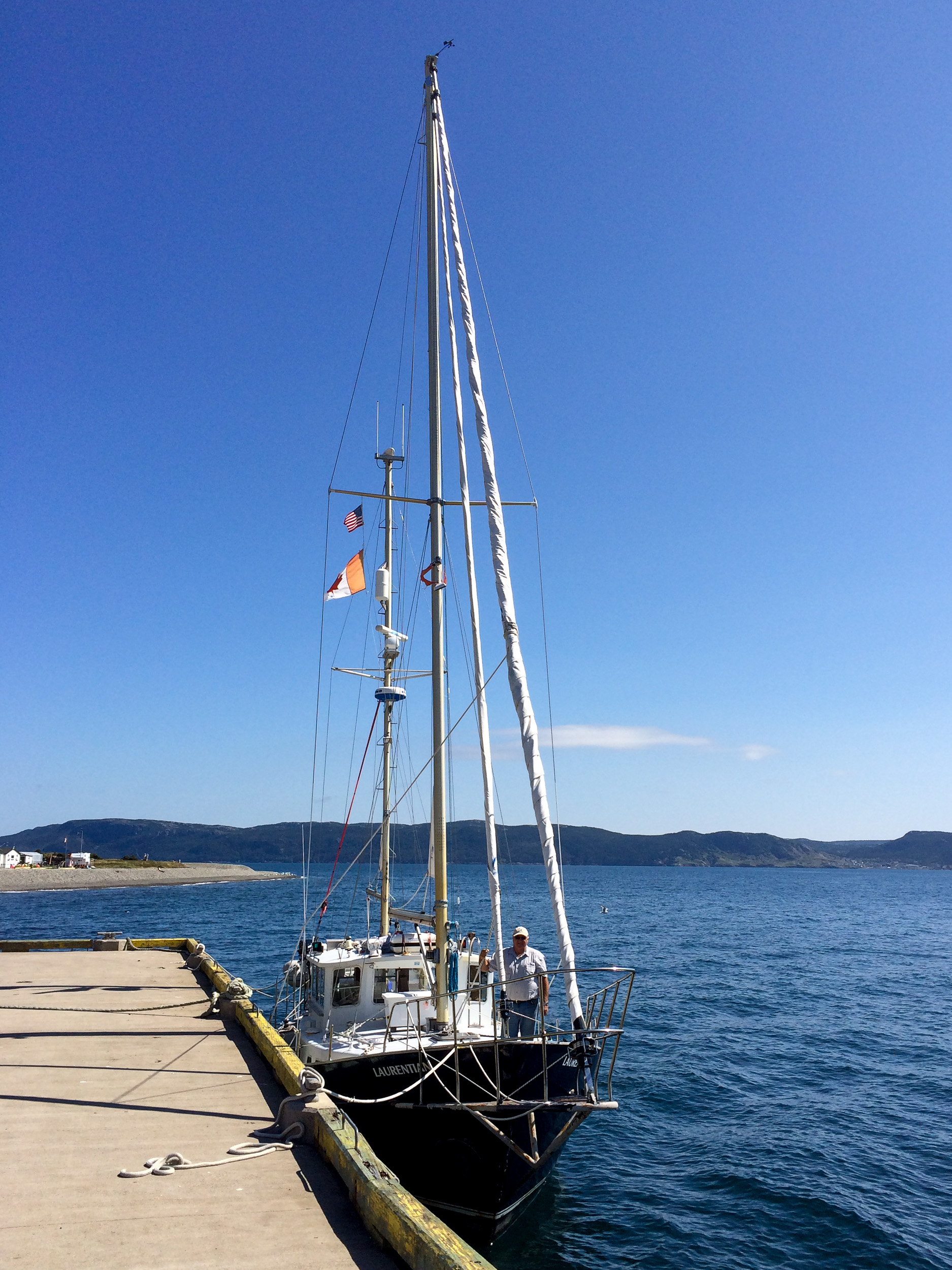
A sailboat docked at a pier in The Front

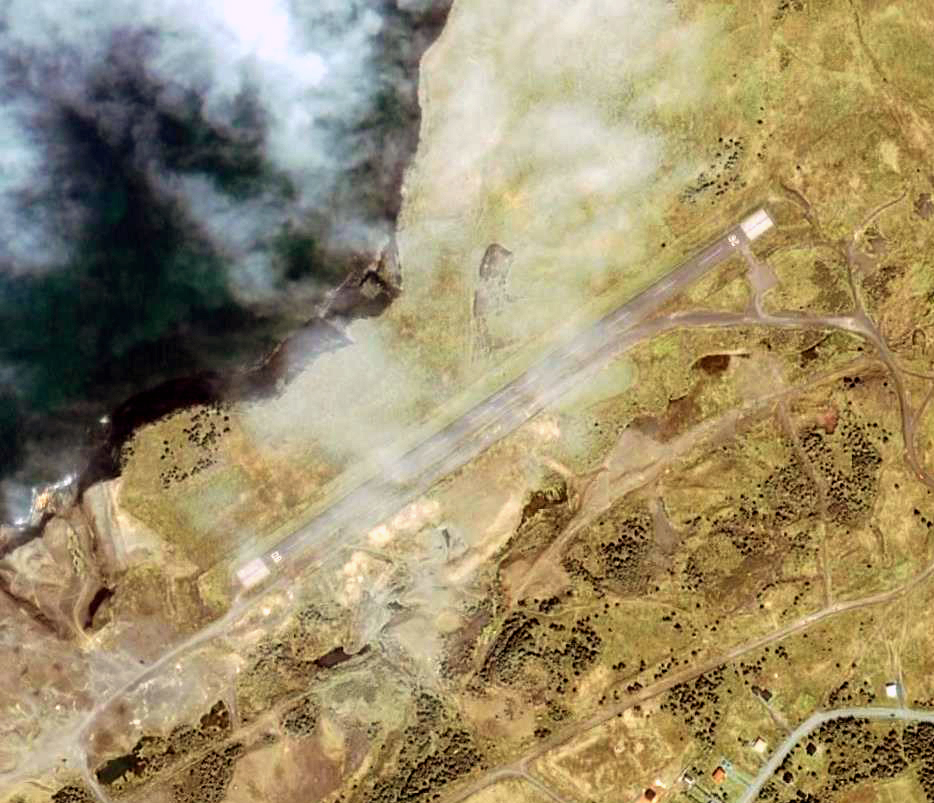
Satellite image of Bell Island Airport

== Economy ==
Bell Island has only a limited number of jobs compared to its population due to the relatively difficult local economic situation. These few jobs are primarily located in the education, service, health and tourism sectors. Especially since the late 1990s, Bell Island has been strongly committed to tourism as an economic sector. Both the provincial and federal government have financially funded Bell Island tourism.

Some residents get their income from (self-employed) work in the local primary sector, just like before the mining period. This concerns both fishing and agriculture. For several families, a vegetable garden and wild berry picking has traditionally been an additional source of income, albeit to a much lesser extent than in the mid-20th century.

Most of the remaining non-elderly residents, however, work in the St. John's Metropolitan Area and commute daily by ferry. This has transformed Wabana into a commuter town. The ferry connection is thus vital for residents not only to go to work but also to buy certain things that are not available on Bell Island itself.

== Tourism ==
The Newfoundland and Labrador provincial government promotes Bell Island as a tourist destination with a ferry connection to Portugal Cove. Seabirds, marine mammals and, depending on the season, icebergs can be spotted during the crossing. In addition to a bed and breakfast, the island also has several cottages and Airbnb apartments that can be rented by tourists. Those who do not have a (rental) car, can use the local taxi service.

Tourist attractions on the Bell Island coast includes rock formations that can be visited on foot or boat trips, several beaches, a large part of them only accessible from the sea, and snorkelling and kayaking. A network on walking trails called the Gregory Normore Coastal Walking Trails leads along the entire island coast, passing the lighthouse and Keeper's Cafe. In the centre of the island there are also a few mountain bike trails through the forests. Due to its natural beauty, the island is also known as "the Belle of the Bay".

The Bell Island Community Museum, which is open from early June to late September, document the history of mining on the island, and attracts an average of 13,000 visitors annually. It houses a permanent exhibition that of mining artifacts, and a large collection of photographs by the photographer Yousuf Karsh. Visitors can also visit the "No. 2 Mine" on a guided tour. The mine has been recognized as provincial heritage since 2006 and can be entered through the basement of the museum. (Note: Only the parts above sea level can still be visited, as the even lower (undersea) part of the "No. 2 Mine" was flooded in 1949.) Murals have been painted on several buildings in the Town of Wabana, including the town office, referencing the mining past.

The two World War Two defensive guns of the coastal battery, which are located near the ferry port, are still in good condition and can be visited. There is also a WWII memorial at Lance Cove, as well as a memorial to the victims of the ferry disaster. However, the war has been for the largest part beneficial to diving tourism, as four ships sunken by U-boats are located relatively close to the island's shores. Experienced divers can also dive into the submerged mining tunnels if they have permission and certification.

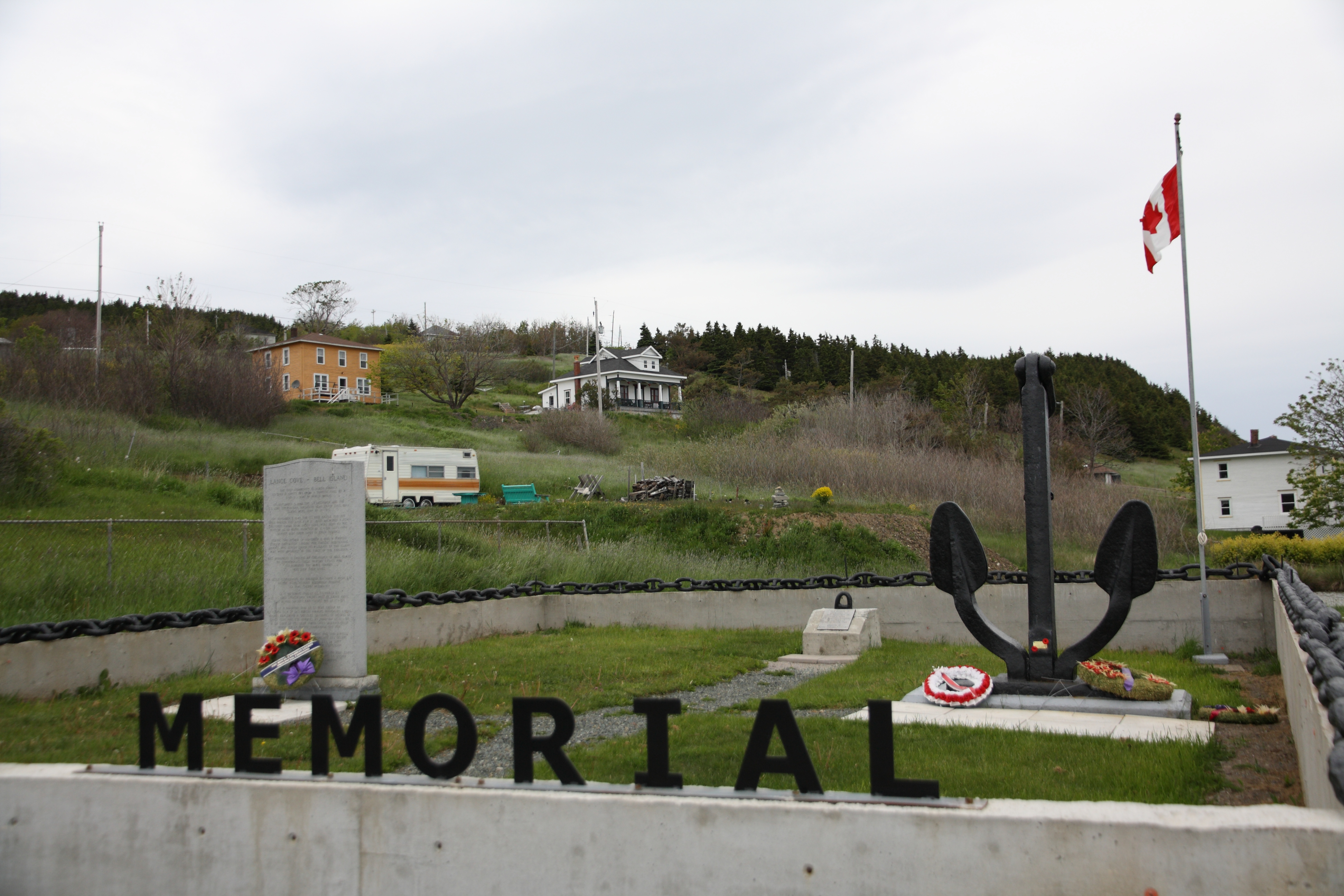
Monument in Lance Cove commemorating the events of WWII

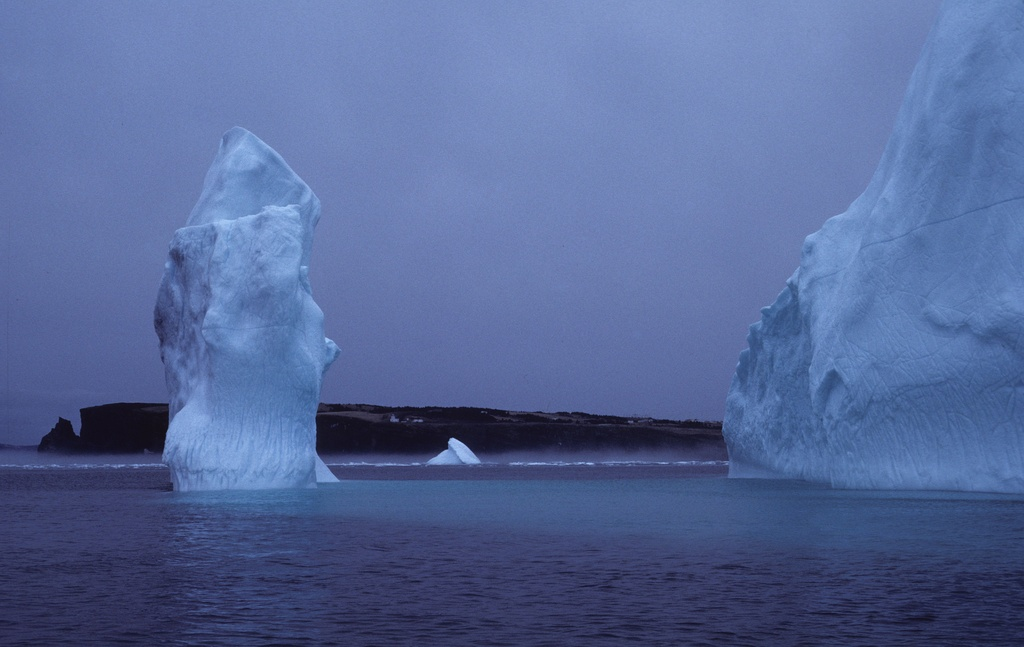
Icebergs in Conception Bay, near Bell Island

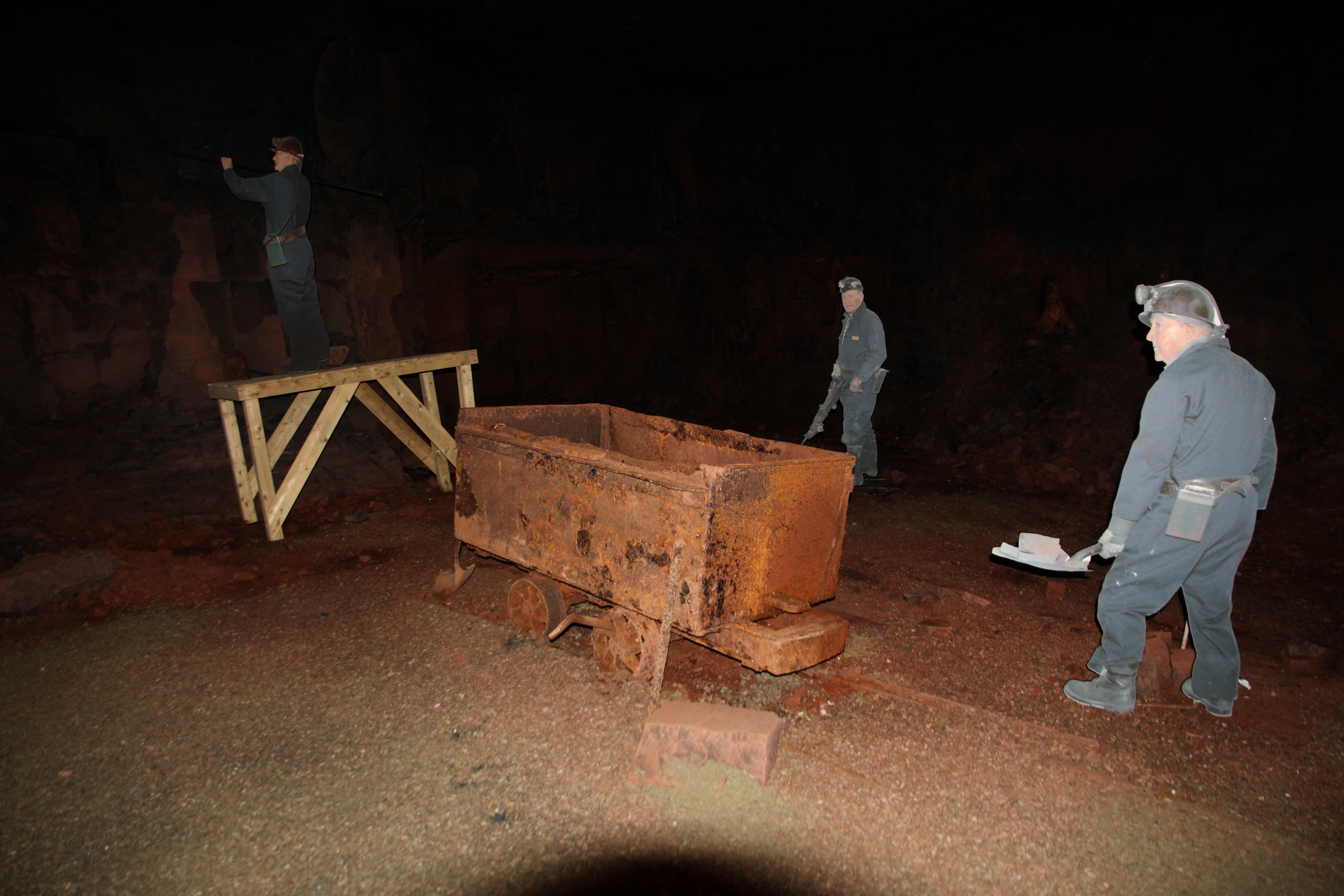
Depiction of miners in the No. 2 Mine

== Culture ==
=== Events ===
Bell Island hosts several annual events that all take place in the summer months. The Belle-Fest Days, a multi-day cultural festival, features performances by local singers, accordionists and other musicians who play typical Newfoundland music, stage performances and historical extras.

A smaller multi-day event are the Town Square Days in the town square of Wabana with food and drink stalls and music and dance. At Harry's Lookout, a point on the coast named after local musician Harry Hibbs, there are occasional performances in the summer.

At the beginning of June, the museum hosts an annual candlelight commemoration evening in memory of the deceased miners.

=== Sports ===
The island is home to the Bell Island Minor Hockey Association. This ice hockey association has both adult and youth sections known in competition as the "Bell Island Miners". They complete their home games at the Monsignor Bartlett Memorial Arena. Other sports that sometimes have tournaments or competitions on Bell Island at the amateur level include field hockey, softball, curling and volleyball.

In the mining days curling was a popular sport on the island and there was a curling club. In the 21st century, the Bell Island Curling Club is just a drinking establishment and no longer a sports club, although the building on Petries Hill does house the "Bell Island Sports Hall of Fame". There was also a tennis club for many years that regularly hosted matches against teams from Harbour Grace, St. John's and Carbonear, although it no longer exists in the 21st century.

The Vinland Motorsport association organizes events for fast cars and motorcycles on the deserted airstrip.

=== Claims of Paranormal Activity ===
Bell Island has long had a reputation as a "ghost island", with all kinds of folktales about supernatural beings and phenomena. During the mining days, the community had people from different cultural backgrounds, mixing all kinds of folklore. The local community embraces the island's supernatural reputation and the local tourist office likes to put Bell Island in the spotlight as "North America's most haunted island". An organized walk through the many ghost stories takes place on Friday and Saturday evenings in the summer with an accompanying stage performance at a mine shaft.

Most famous is the Bell Island hag (also called the Woman in White or White Woman), an evil female figure who is said to roam the island's swamps and farmland, mainly around Dobbin's Garden, in white costume. Approaching her victim, she transforms into a horrible creature that wears gray rags, moves on all fours and smells terribly of sulphur. It victim is temporarily paralyzed by the unbearable stench and gets the feeling that the hag is crawling over him or her. There are several origin stories of the hag, although the most popular one holds that she is a girl murdered by Germans. However, another tradition holds that it is actually a male figure who merely pretends to be a woman. The Canadian Post gave the Bell Island hag national exposure in 2016 by giving it its own stamp during the Halloween period.

According to local folklore, Butler's Marsh, the swamps near West Mines, are also home to fairies. Contrary to most traditions, however, they are evil and deformed male fairies, albeit led by a queen. The fairies lure their victims into the swamps, where they are never seen again. They are a well-known deterrent to young children when they misbehave. Also, the ghosts of killed miners are said to roam the underground passages, especially those of the No. 4 Mine.

== Bell Island Boom ==
On Sunday, April 2, 1978, a huge bang was heard at Bell Island just before noon. The bang was so loud that people reported hearing it as far as 100 km away. The blast sent a shock wave that shook buildings on the island and killed some animals. The energy release was so powerful that the Vela satellites (which the US government used to detect nuclear tests by other powers) noticed the phenomenon, now known as the Bell Island Boom.

There were multiple reports of damaged electrical wiring and destroyed electrical appliances. The epicentre was around the Bickford family farm in the hamlet of Bickfordville, near Lance Cove. They claimed to have seen a gigantic bluish flame and both their television set and fuse box had exploded. The chicken coop was completely destroyed and all the chickens had died. Neighbours soon discovered three large pits in the snow behind the farm, which were considered to be the epicentre. The son who was cycling nearby at that time also stated that he saw two luminous spheres flying by.

All sorts of hypotheses about the cause quickly emerged, from rational explanation attempts to conspiracy theories. In general, based on the evidence, it is assumed that it was a superbolt, a rare and very powerful type of lightning occurring only about once per two million lightning strikes or so, normally high in the atmosphere or above the ocean. This was also the conclusion of two scientists at the Los Alamos Scientific Laboratory who detected "superbolts" using data from the Vela satellites and therefore conducted an on-site investigation shortly after the incident. Based on the testimony of the luminous spheres there are often also references to ball lightning, an even rarer lightning phenomenon that has not yet been scientifically explained, though skeptics note that eyewitness statements are notoriously unreliable.

However, some people did not believe these theories and all kinds of speculation arose, ranging from a failed secret test by the US or the Soviets, possibly from an EMP weapon or a weather modification attempt, up to and including alien UFOs.

Theories about the incident have been broadcast on TV channels the History Channel and the Travel Channel, and it has been featured in books and podcasts.

== Prominent former residents ==
- David Jackman (1902–1967), union leader and member of the NL House of Assembly
- Steve Neary (1925–1996), provincial MHA, provincial minister and interim party leader of the Liberal Party of Newfoundland and Labrador
- Harry Hibbs (1942–1989), icon of traditional Newfoundland folk music
- David Brazil (born 1963), provincial MHA and interim party leader of the Progressive Conservative Party of Newfoundland and Labrador
- Allan Hawco (born 1977), actor and producer; known for his leading role in Republic of Doyle

== See also ==
- List of islands of Newfoundland and Labrador
- List of communities in Newfoundland and Labrador
- List of lighthouses in Canada

== Bibliography ==
- Bassler, Gerhard P., Vikings to U-Boats: The German Experience in Newfoundland and Labrador, Montreal, 2006. ISBN 9780773531246.
- Bishop-Stirling, Terry and Webb, Jeff A., "The Twentieth Century", A Short History of Newfoundland and Labrador, Newfoundland Historical Society, Portugal Cove-St. Phillip's, 2008, p. 103-140. ISBN 9780978338183.
- Carew, Stanley, "Bell Island Was Exciting For a Growing Boy", Smallwood, J.R. e.a. red., The Book of Newfoundland, Vol. 6, St. John's, 1975, p. 227-232. OCLC 317527823.
- Dwyer, Paul J., From Miners and Fishers to Soldiers and Sailors, St. John's, 2016. OCLC 1301975297.
- Ernst, Chloë, Scenic Driving Atlantic Canada: Nova Scotia, New Brunswick, Prince Edward Island, Newfoundland & Labrador, Kearney (Nebraska), 2011. ISBN 9780762764815.
- Hammond, John W., The beautiful isles: a history of Bell Island from 1611-1896, 2nd edition, St. John's, 1979. ISBN 9780969068815.
- MacKinnon, Richard, "Company Housing in Wabana, Bell Island, Newfoundland" (Research Notes), Material Culture Review, Vol. 14, 1982, p. 67-71.
- McIlroy, Duncan, The Application of Ichnology to Palaeoenvironmental and Stratigraphic Analysis, The Geological Society, Londen, 2004. ISBN 9781862391543.
- Neary, Peter, Newfoundland in the North Atlantic World, 1929-1949, Kingston and Montreal, 1988. ISBN 0773506683.
- Neary, Peter, "The Epic Tragedy of Bell Island", Smallwood, J.R. e.a. red., The Book of Newfoundland, Vol. 6, St. John's, 1975, p. 201-226. OCLC 317527823.
- Pickerill, Ron K., Fillion, Denis and Brenchley, Pat J., "A note on the occurrence of Arthrophycus in the Bell Island Group of eastern Newfoundland", Atlantic Geology, 27 (1), Montreal, 1991 p. 73-77. ISSN 0843-5561.
- Pollock, Jeffrey C., "Geology and History of the Wabana Iron Mines, Bell Island, Newfoundland", Geoscience Canada, Vol. 46 (Nr. 2), January 2019, p. 69-83. ISSN 0315-0941.
- Roseman, Sharon R. and Royal, Diane, "Commuting to Garden: Subsisting on Bell Island", Keske, C. red., Food Futures: Growing a Sustainable Food System for Newfoundland and Labrador, St. John's, 2018, p. 49-83. ISBN 9781894725453.
- Rusted, Joan, St. John's. A Brief History, St. John's, 2011. ISBN 9781550813463.
- Sharpe, Christopher A. and Shawyer, A.J., "Building a Wartime Landscape", High, S. red., Occupied St John's: A Social History of a City at War, 1939-1945, Montreal, 2010, p. 21-80. ISBN 9780773537507.
- Slumkoski, Corey J.A., Inventing Atlantic Canada: Regionalism and the Maritime Reaction to Newfoundland's Entry Into Canadian Confederation, Toronto, 2011. ISBN 9781442611580.
- Southey, Victor, "History and Problems of the Wabana Submarine Iron Mines", Canadian Mining and Metallurgical Bulletin (Canadian Institute of Mining and Metallurgy), Vol. 62 (Nr. 684), Montreal, April 1969, pg. 371–396. ISSN 0317-0926.
- Weir, Gail, The Miners of Wabana: The Story of the Iron Ore Miners of Bell Island, Canada's Atlantic Folklore and Folklife Series, St. John's, 2nd edition, 2006. ISBN 0920911692.
- White, Neil, Company Towns: Corporate Order and Community, Toronto, 2012. ISBN 9781442643277.
- Williams, Harold, Geology of the Appalachian—Caledonian Orogen in Canada and Greenland, Geological Survey of Canada, Ottawa, 1995. ISBN 9780813754512.
