= Freshwater (disambiguation) =

Freshwater is any naturally occurring water except seawater and brackish water.

Freshwater or Fresh Water may also refer to:

== Places ==
=== Australia ===
- Freshwater, New South Wales
- Freshwater, Queensland
  - Freshwater railway station, Queensland
- Freshwater National Park, a national park in Queensland

=== Canada ===
- Freshwater, Bell Island, Newfoundland and Labrador
- Freshwater, Conception Bay, Newfoundland and Labrador
- Freshwater, Placentia Bay, Newfoundland and Labrador

=== United Kingdom ===
- Freshwater, Isle of Wight, England
  - Freshwater railway station
- Freshwater East and Freshwater West, Wales

=== United States ===
- Freshwater, California
- Freshwater, Virginia

== People ==
- Benzion Freshwater (born 1948), British property investor
- John Freshwater (born 1956), controversial Ohio science teacher
- Perry Freshwater (born 1973), English rugby player

== Arts and entertainment ==
- Freshwater (film), a 2016 American thriller film
- Fresh Water (film), a 2021 Canadian documentary film
- Freshwater (opera), by Andy Vores, 1994
- Freshwater (play), by Virginia Woolf, 1935
- Fresh Water (album), by Alison MacCallum, 1972
- Freshwater High, a fictional school in TV series Fish Hooks
- Freshwater (novel), by Akwaeke Emezi
- "Fresh Water" (Planet Earth), a 2006 television episode

== Other uses ==
- Freshwater tribe, or Agua Dulce people, a Timucua people of northeastern Florida
- Freshwater people, Aboriginal and Torres Strait Islander people
- Saltwater and freshwater economics
- LB&SCR A1X Class W8 Freshwater, a steam locomotive on the Isle of Wight Steam Railway
- Freshwater-class ferry, an Australian ferry

== See also ==
- Freshwater Bay (disambiguation)
- Freshwater Creek, California
- Freshwater East
- Freshwater Place
- Freshwater River, New Zealand
- Freshwater Senior Campus
- Freshwater West
