= Freshwater National Park =

National park in Australia

- IUCN category II (national park)
- Location within Queensland
- Location: Queensland
- Nearest city: Redcliffe
- Coordinates: 27°10′32″S 152°59′23″E
- Area: 0.94 km^{2} (0.36 sq mi)
- Established: 1973
- Governing body: Queensland Parks and Wildlife Service

Freshwater is a national park in Queensland, Australia, 34 km north of Brisbane. The park is west of Redcliffe, near Deception Bay, within Caboolture Shire.

The park's vegetation is a remnant of the Open Sclerophyll Woodland which was once common in this area. The dominant trees are Eucalyptus species, notably scribbly gum - Eucalyptus racemosa with smooth white trunks, and some Angophora species, while the shrub layer varies from an Open Heath area dominated by low grasstrees in the south of the park to dense Casuarina stands, and small swampy areas with paperbark trees (Melaleuca sp.). A small creek runs through the north end of the park. Sighted in the Open Heath area are low growing plants such as the fringed lilly Thysanotus tuberosus, tall sundew Drosera peltata, which is a carnivorous plant, flat-stemmed cord rush Eurychorda complanata and Wallum grevillea Grevillea leiophylla, which is a delicate pink flowered grevillea growing to only about 30 cm. This is only a small selection of the numerous beautiful plants to be found in this park. This park is one of the few protected places of Open Woodland/Low Heathland in the area. Much of this type of vegetation has been cleared for development.

Though very small, and surrounded by development, roads and a highway, the park is rich with wildlife. In spring it teams with birds, most noticeable being the many species of honeyeaters. Australian fairywrens such as the beautiful blue variegated fairywren and the brilliant red and black red-backed fairywren both occur here. In a very large old gum tree wedge-tailed eagles have made a nest, and the adults are often seen soaring over the park. Calls from white-throated gerygones, spangled drongos and rainbow bee-eaters make a pleasant background sound in the park.

The invertebrate fauna is rich, with many species of dragonflies and damselflies being quite obvious in summer. The magnificent large dragonfly Hemianax papuensis hawks through the park all year long, while in summer the beautiful Rhyothemis graphiptera, with wings barred with glistening dark purple, waft slowly along the tracks, and deep red Diplacodes bipunctata males sun themselves on twigs low to the ground.

== See also ==
- Protected areas of Queensland
