= Lance Cove, Newfoundland and Labrador =

Local service district in Canada

Coordinates: 47°36′N 52°59′W

Location of Lance Cove, Bell Island in Newfoundland and Labrador

Lance Cove, Newfoundland and Labrador is a local service district and designated place in the Canadian province of Newfoundland and Labrador.

Lance Cove is a village on Bell Island that is located south of Wabana and east of Bickfordville. The Way Office was established in 1888 and the first Way Master was William Clements.

== Geography ==
Lance Cove, Bell Island is in Newfoundland within Subdivision R of Division No. 1.

== Demographics ==
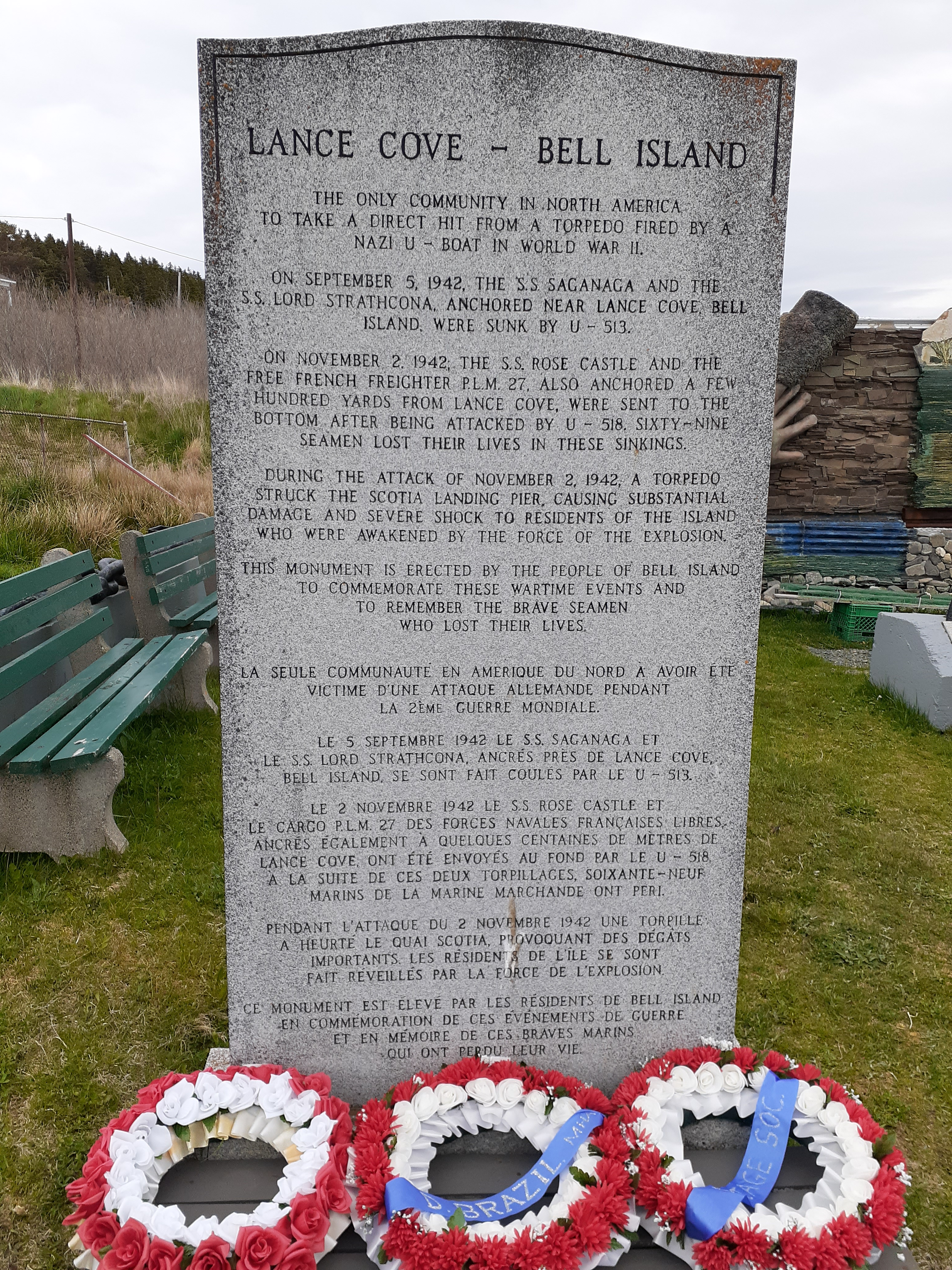
1942 U-Boat attack memorial

As a designated place in the 2021 Census of Population conducted by Statistics Canada, Lance Cove, Bell Island recorded a population of 264 living in 144 of its 193 total private dwellings, a change of -18% from its 2016 population of 322.

== Government ==
Lance Cove, Bell Island is a local service district (LSD) that is governed by a committee responsible for the provision of certain services to the community. The chair of the LSD committee is Sharon Hammond.

== See also ==
- Bell Island (Newfoundland and Labrador)
- List of designated places in Newfoundland and Labrador
- List of local service districts in Newfoundland and Labrador
- Newfoundland outport
- Wabana, Newfoundland and Labrador
