= Hardscrabble, California =

Hardscrabble, California may refer to:

- Freshwater, California
- Ione, California
