= Bickfordville =

Hamlet in Newfoundland and Labrador

Coordinates: 47.601°N 52.991°W

Location of Bickfordville in Newfoundland and Labrador

Bickfordville is a hamlet in the Canadian province of Newfoundland and Labrador. The community is located in the south of Bell Island in Newfoundland's eastern Conception Bay.

== History ==
The place owes its name to the fact that a large part of the population there bears the surname Bickford. Until 1970 there was a local branch of the Loyal Orange Association in Bickfordville.

In 1947 a referendum was held on the island to decide whether or not to grant it a municipality status; with "no" as a result. Bickfordville then had 43 adults of which 12 voted for and 31 against.

On April 2, 1978, the island was hit by a huge and never fully cleared explosion that came to be known as the Bell Island Boom. Bickfordville was at the epicenter of this event.

== Geography ==
The settlement of Bickfordville is located in the south of Bell Island, a large island in Conception Bay off the coast of southeastern Newfoundland. The place is located in an unincorporated area and is located between the hamlets of Freshwater and Lance Cove. The hamlet consists of the houses and other buildings along Bickford's Road and part of Lance Cove Road.

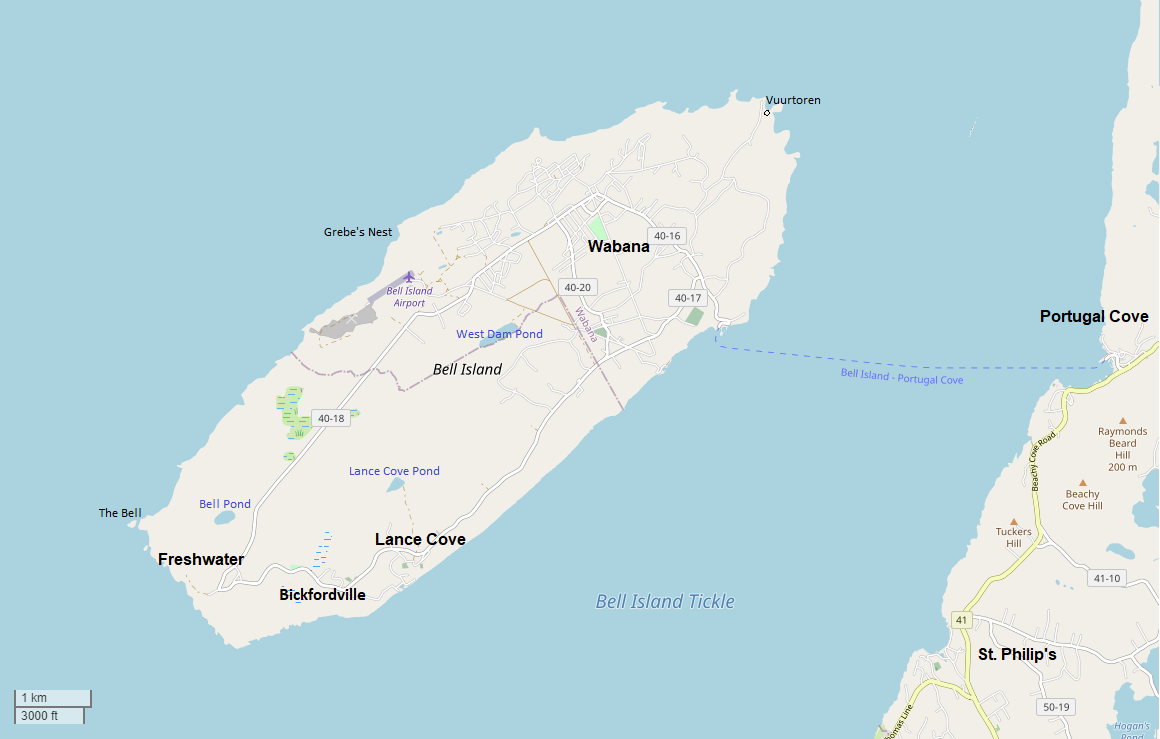
Detailed map of Bell Island with indication of Bickfordville
