= Freshwater, Bell Island, Newfoundland and Labrador =

Location of Freshwater in Newfoundland and Labrador

Freshwater is a village in Newfoundland and Labrador. It is located in Conception Bay on Bell Island, just west of Bickfordville and south of Wabana.

== History ==
Before World War 2, Freshwater was a tiny fishing settlement. Between 1941 and 1964, the population of Freshwater increased by a significant percentage due to the establishment of the naval base at Argentia. However, the population of Freshwater declined between 1972 and 1981. Freshwater now has a local community centre called La Fontaine. The community centre offers various activities for residents.
