= Freshwater Elementary School District =

School district in California, United States

Address
- 75 Greenwood Heights Drive Eureka, California, 95503; United States

District information
- Type: Public
- Grades: K–8
- NCES District ID: 0614520

Students and staff
- Students: 323
- Teachers: 15.0 (FTE)
- Staff: 19.13 (FTE)
- Student–teacher ratio: 21.53

Other information
- Website: www.freshwatersd.org

The Freshwater Elementary School District has two schools located about 5 miles northeast of Eureka, California, in unincorporated Freshwater. The district oversees public education through grade 8, in a portion of west central Humboldt County, California. Generally the area served includes students who live, in addition to portions of Freshwater and Kneeland, in all of the unincorporated community of Indianola, and unincorporated neighborhoods between these and the northeast limit of the City of Eureka.

The district operates Freshwater Elementary School, a K-6 public school, and Freshwater Charter Middle School for seventh and eighth graders, both of which are on the same site. The original school was a one-room schoolhouse dating from the late 19th-century. In the 1920s, a two-room all wood construction school was built. A new, modern, ten room school was built in 1952 and has been renovated and expanded several times since.

The school board consists of five members:

- Mike Haley
- Dustin Owens
- John Wegis
- Rebecca Baugh
- Audrey Dieker

The superintendent/principal is Sinon Talty, with a part-time vice-principal, Suzanne Nickols. These administrators oversee both schools on the site.

== Freshwater Elementary School ==
The primary operation and largest school operated by the district is a rural K-6 public school located 5 miles northeast of Eureka, California. The school setting is on a large parcel among redwood trees and includes expansive areas for recreation and appreciation for nature of the California North Coast. There are 19 teachers and 31 staff which support the education of 271 students. The district modernized 10 classrooms in 2003 and recently finished building two new classrooms, a band room and a large community gym to augment a smaller multi-purpose building and gym that has existed since the most recent school was built on the site in 1952.

== Freshwater Charter Middle School ==
The district developed and operates a charter school for seventh and eighth graders on the same site as the Elementary school. Four staff in the district are solely responsible for educating students in this setting, which prepares students to advance to high school.
