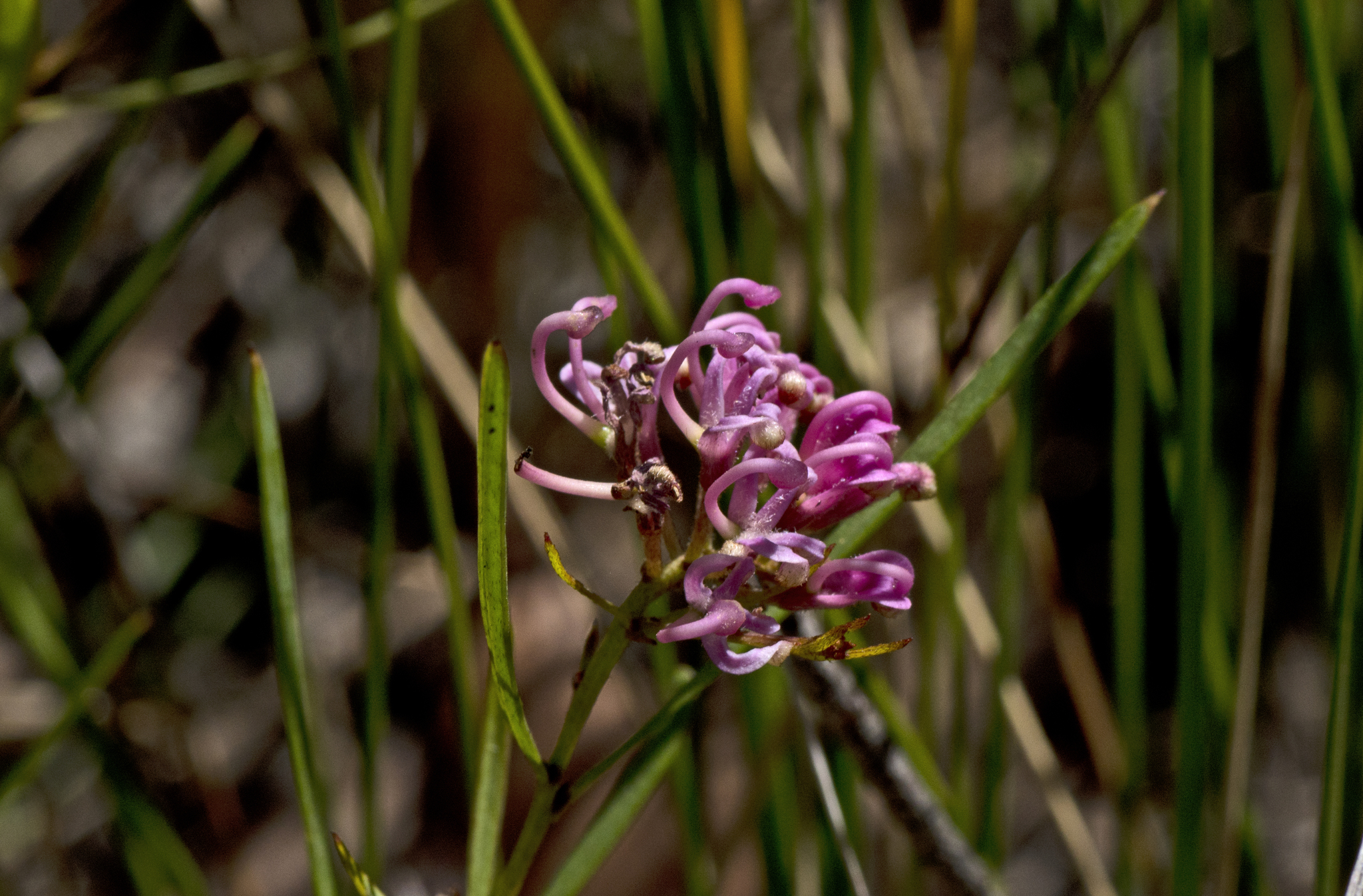
- Near Wamuran

Conservation status
- Endangered (IUCN 3.1)

Scientific classification
- Kingdom: Plantae
- Clade: Embryophytes
- Clade: Tracheophytes
- Clade: Angiosperms
- Clade: Eudicots
- Order: Proteales
- Family: Proteaceae
- Genus: Grevillea
- Species: G. leiophylla

Binomial name
- Grevillea leiophylla F.Muell. ex Benth.

= Grevillea leiophylla =

Species of shrub endemic to Queensland, Australia

Grevillea leiophylla, commonly known as wallum grevillea, or dwarf spider oak, is a species of flowering plant in the family Proteaceae and is endemic to Queensland. It is a weakly erect to low-lying shrub with narrowly oblong to egg-shaped or more or less linear leaves, and clusters of pale to deep pink flowers.

== Description ==
Grevillea leiophylla is a weakly erect to low-lying shrub that typically grows to a height of 20–60 cm (7.9–23.6 in), and has ridged branchlets. Its leaves are often crowded, narrowly oblong, narrowly egg-shaped with the narrower end towards the base or more or less linear, 20–60 mm (0.79–2.36 in) long and 1–3 mm (0.039–0.118 in) wide. The flowers are arranged on the ends of branches in groups of 8 to 24 on one side of the rachis and pale to deep pink, the style pink turning red with age, and the pistil 6–10 mm (0.24–0.39 in) long. Flowering mainly occurs from August to November, and the fruit is a follicle with small lumps and about 9 mm (0.35 in) long.

== Taxonomy ==
Grevillea leiophylla was first formally described in 1870 by George Bentham in Flora Australiensis from an unpublished manuscript by Ferdinand von Mueller. The specific epithet (leiophylla) means "smooth-leaved".

== Distribution and habitat ==
Wallum grevillea grows in shrubby woodland, forest, wallum or grassland in south-eastern Queensland, possibly as far north as Yeppoon.

== See also ==
- List of Grevillea species
