= Freshwater Creek =

River in California, United States

Physical characteristics
- Source: Freshwater Creek headwaters
  - location: north of Barry Ridge
  - coordinates: 40°43′29″N 123°57′06″W
- 2nd source: South Fork Freshwater Creek headwaters
  - location: west of Barry Ridge
  - coordinates: 40°42′50″N 123°59′35″W
- 3rd source: Little Freshwater Creek headwaters
  - coordinates: 40°42′46″N 124°03′01″W
- Mouth: Eureka Slough
  - coordinates: 40°48′06″N 124°07′04″W
- Length: 23 km (14 mi)
- Basin size: 9,227 hectares (35.63 sq mi)

Freshwater Creek is a 23 kilometres (14 mi) long creek in Humboldt County, California that is a tributary of the Eureka Slough that in turn feeds Humboldt Bay. It flows (via Eureka Slough) into the south-east corner of the Arcata Bay sub-bay of Humboldt Bay. Its downstream reach is also known as Freshwater Slough and its upstream reach as Freshwater Gulch.

The lower Slough reach is tidal and brackish, as Eureka Slough itself has salt water; but the upper reaches are non-tidal and have fresh water, this being the straightforward reason for the name "freshwater". Along with Jacoby Creek (also in Arcata Bay), Elk River (in Entrance Bay), and Salmon Creek (in South Bay) Freshwater Creek is one of the primary sources of fresh water entering Humboldt Bay.

== Basin, hydrology, and biota ==
The creek basin is roughly 9,227 hectares (35.63 sq mi), with 32.4 square miles (8,400 ha) of that above Freshwater Corners and 28.5 square miles (7,400 ha) above Freshwater town. The creek is at approximately sea level at its mouth and 823 metres (2,700 ft) above at its headwaters. The highest that the creek basin as a whole rises above sea level is 2,800 feet (850 m) in the south east.

At the mouth the rough annual rainfall is 100 centimetres (39 in) and at the headwaters it is 150 centimetres (59 in). Most of the rainfall, between 35% and 40%, occurs in December and January. Snowfall is rare. The mean temperature of the creek water ranges from 15 °C (59 °F) in summer to 8 °C (46 °F) in winter. Prevailing winds are from the Pacific Ocean.

In the tidal lower 6 kilometres (3.7 mi) reach, the Slough, the creek is surrounded mainly by ranchland and residential properties. The creek gradient is low (34 feet per mile (6.4 m/km)), with levees along most of the channel; the riparian forest thin; and the water brackish.

In the upper non-tidal reaches the riparian forest thickens with vegetation, conifers, and hardwood trees. The gradient is much steeper at 315 feet per mile (59.7 m/km).

Most of the main river course is sparsely populated, with most of the watershed of the upper reaches being timberland that is owned and managed by the Pacific Lumber Company. Most of the residential properties, including those of Freshwater, are along the banks of the main creek.

Logging activity has caused heavy erosion of the watershed, and Eureka Slough, via the Freshwater Slough, receives silt from the basin.

== Tributaries and other locations ==
The general course of the creek is west-south-west for 5 miles (8.0 km) and then north-west for the rest of its roughly 23 kilometres (14 mi) total length.

- Its major tributaries are:
  - McReady Gulch, mouth at 40°45′49″N 124°03′55″W headwaters at 40°47′43″N 124°02′40″W
  - Cloney Gulch, mouth at 40°45′27″N 124°02′58″W headwaters at 40°46′34″N 124°00′27″W
  - Graham Gulch, mouth at 40°45′13″N 124°02′55″W headwaters at 40°45′12″N 124°00′10″W
  - South Fork Freshwater Creek, mouth at 40°43′53″N 124°02′52″W
  - Little Freshwater Creek, mouth at 40°45′25″N 124°03′50″W

The eponymous town of Freshwater is located along the main creek.

The land, railroad, and logging mill on the Creek were owned by the Excelsior Redwood Company until being bought at the turn of the 20th century by H. C. Smith of Minnesota, whose company after corporate reorganization was to become the Pacitic Lumber Company. The railway had originally been the Humboldt Logging Railway built by the South Bay RR & Land Company in the 1880s when it had logged out Salmon Creek.

The Creek is bridged by Myrtle Avenue, Howard Heights road, Steele Lane, the Freshwater Park Bridge, and on a private road.

== See also ==
- List of rivers of California

== Sources ==
- Wood, Beatrice Dawson (1913). "Freshwater Gulch, Freshwater Creek, Freshwater Slough". Gazetteer of surface waters of California: Part III, Pacific coast and Great Basin streams. Water-supply Papers. Vol. 297. Washington, D.C.: United States Geological Survey.
- Goin, Jonathan J. (May 2009). Spawning migration dynamics of ocean-returning salmonids (Oncorhychus spp.) in Freshwater Creek, California (MSc. thesis). Humboldt State University.
- Gudde, Erwin Gustav (1960). "Freshwater Lagoon". California Place Names: The Origin and Etymology of Current Geographical Names. University of California Press.
- Humboldt Bay Harbor Marina Regulatory Permit Application. United States Army Corps of Engineers. 1977. 10643–21.
- Barnhart, Roger A.; Boyd, Milton J.; Pequegnat, John E. (1992). The Ecology of Humboldt Bay, California: An Estuarine Profile. United States Department of the Interior, Fish and Wildlife Service.
- O'Hara, Susan J.P.; Service, Alex (2018). Mills of Humboldt County, 1910–1945. Images of America. Arcadia Publishing. ISBN 9781467127769.
- Carranco, Lynwood; Labbe, John T. (1975). Logging the Redwoods. Caxton Press. ISBN 9780870043734.
- Flood plain information: Freshwater Creek, Humboldt County, California. United States Army Corps of Engineers. October 1975.
