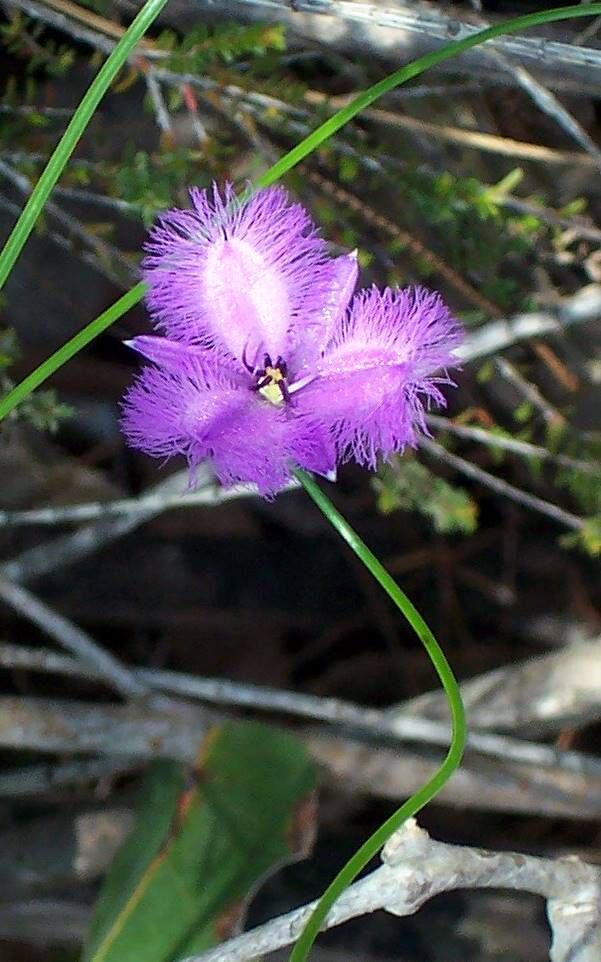
- In Ku-ring-gai Chase National Park, Australia

Scientific classification
- Kingdom: Plantae
- Clade: Embryophytes
- Clade: Tracheophytes
- Clade: Spermatophytes
- Clade: Angiosperms
- Clade: Monocots
- Order: Asparagales
- Family: Asparagaceae
- Subfamily: Lomandroideae
- Genus: Thysanotus
- Species: T. tuberosus

Binomial name
- Thysanotus tuberosus R.Br.

Synonyms
- Chlamysporum tuberosum (R.Br.) Kuntze; Thysanotus elatior R.Br. p.p.

= Thysanotus tuberosus =

Fringe-lily

Species of plant

Thysanotus tuberosus, commonly known as fringed violet, fringed lily, or common fringe lily, is a species of flowering plant in the Asparagaceae family, and is endemic to Australia. It is a tufted herb with a small rootstock, tuberous cylindrical to elliptic roots, channelled linear, annual leaves and umbels of up to eight mauve flowers with lance-shaped sepals, egg-shaped, fringed petals and six stamens with anthers of different lengths.

== Description ==
Thysanotus tuberosus is a tufted herb with a small rootstock, tuberous roots, cylindrical to elliptic tubers about 10–20 mm (0.39–0.79 in) long, 35–50 cm (14–20 in) from the rootstock. The 5 to 15 leaves are produced annually, linear, 200–600 mm (7.9–23.6 in) long, channelled below and more or less terete near the tip. The flowers are borne in panicles with up to eight flowers on each branch, each flower on a pedicel 6–22 mm (0.24–0.87 in) long. The perianth segments are 7–19 mm (0.28–0.75 in) long, the sepal lance-shaped, about 2.0–2.5 mm (0.079–0.098 in) long. The petals are mauve, egg-shaped, 5–7 mm (0.20–0.28 in) wide with a fringe about 5 mm (0.20 in) long. There are six stamens with twisted anthers, the outer 3 anthers 2.5–4.5 mm (0.098–0.177 in) long, the inner ones 3–9 mm (0.12–0.35 in) long, and the style is 4–9 mm (0.16–0.35 in) long. Flowering occurs from September to April, and the capsule is 3–7 mm (0.12–0.28 in) in diameter.

== Taxonomy ==
Thysanotus tuberosus was first formally described in 1810 by Robert Brown in his Prodromus Florae Novae Hollandiae.

In 1981, Norman H. Brittan described two subspecies of S. tuberosus in the journal Brunonia, and the names are accepted by the Australian Plant Census:

- Thysanotus tuberosus subsp. parviflorus (Benth.) Brittan (previously known as Thysanotus tuberosus var. parviflorus Benth.) has perianth segments usually 7.5–10 mm (0.30–0.39 in) long and about 5 mm (0.20 in) wide.
- Thysanotus tuberosus R.Br. subsp. tuberosus

== Distribution and habitat ==
Fringed lily grows in a wide variety of situations, from semi-arid parts of south eastern Australia to coastal areas receiving more than 1,300 mm (51 in) of rain per year. It is found in Queensland, New South Wales, the Australian Capital Territory, Victoria and South Australia. Both subspecies are found throughout the species' range, although they are often difficult to separate as the characters overlap.
