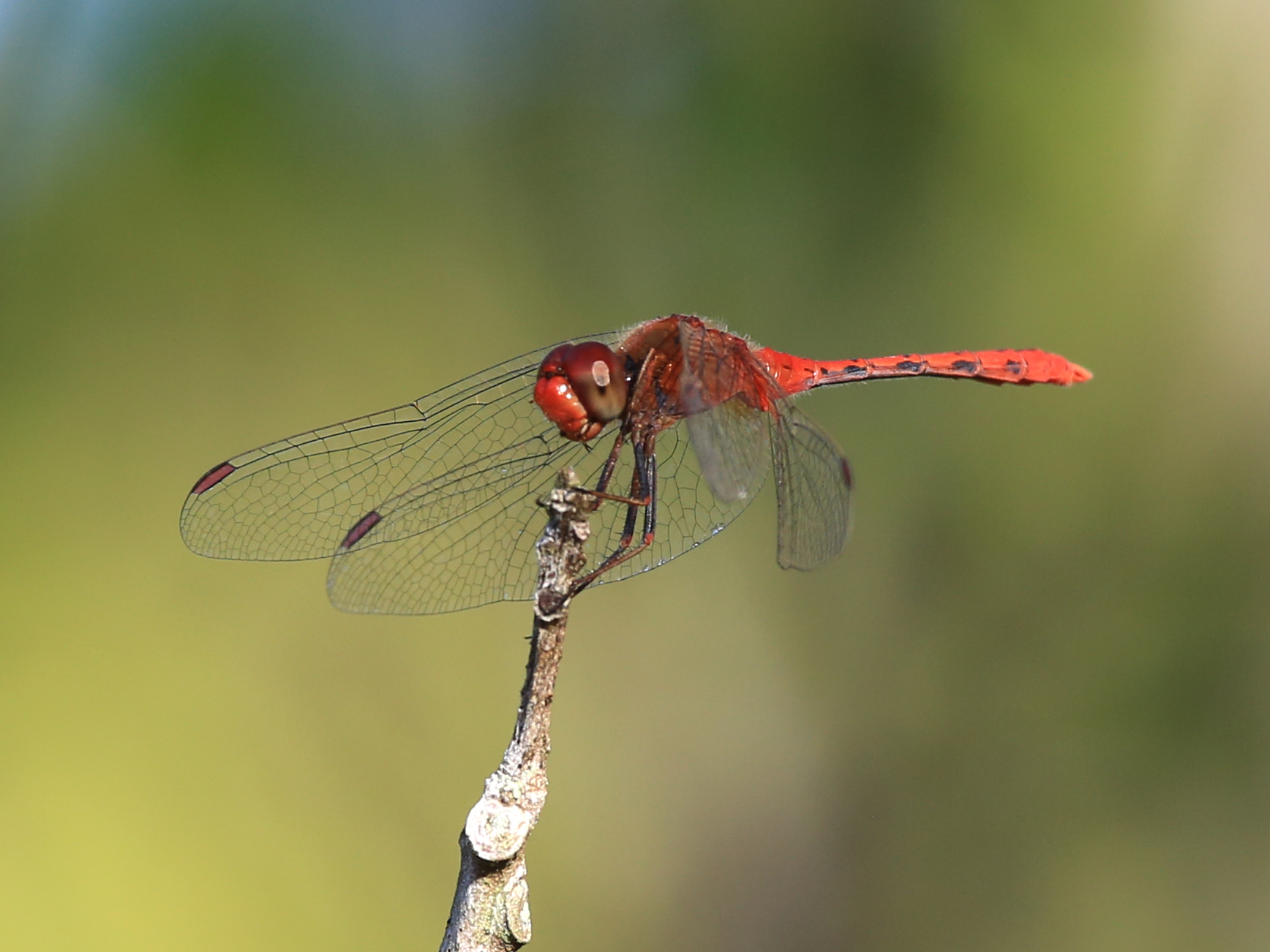
- Male
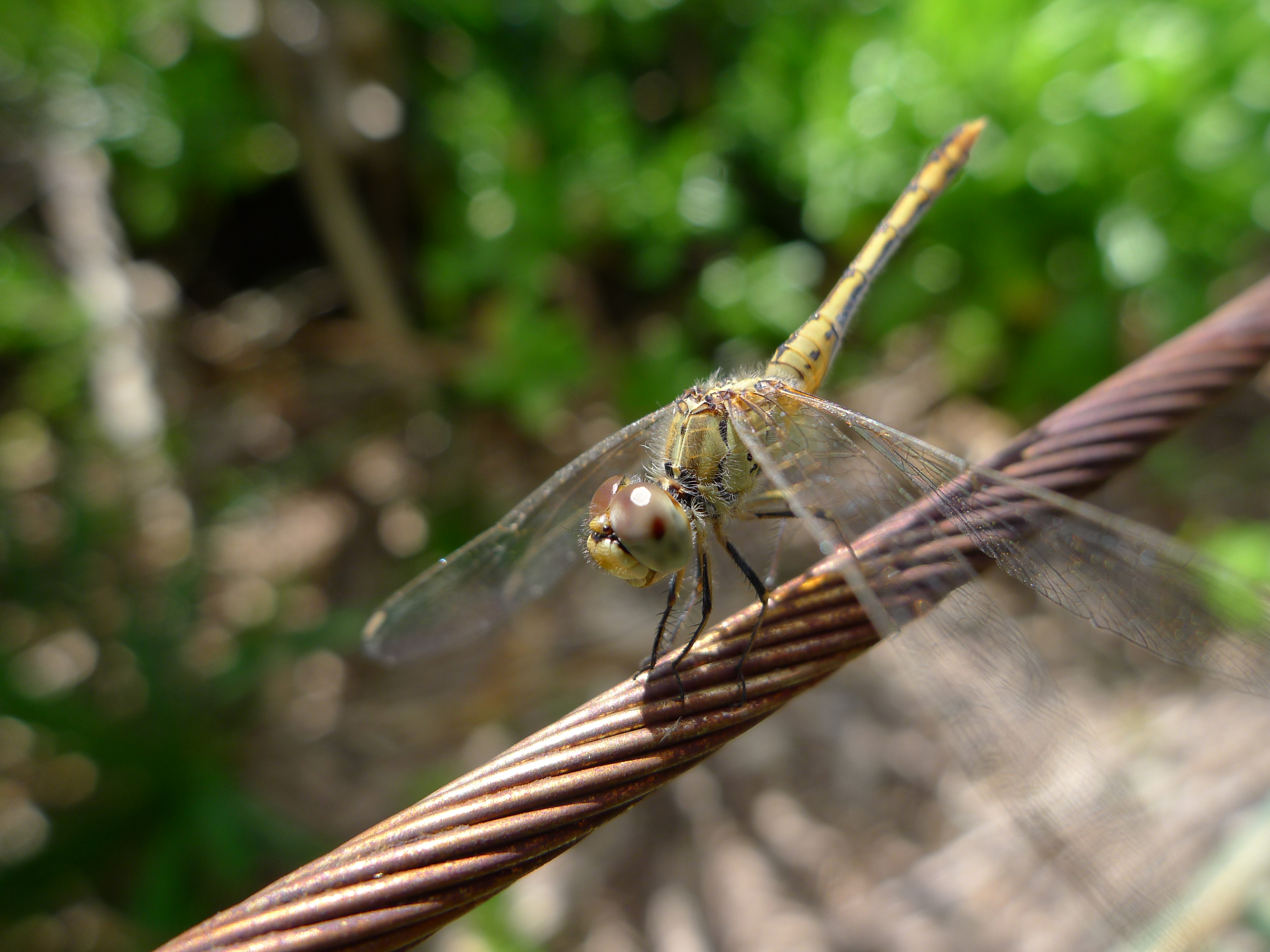
- Female

Conservation status
- Least Concern (IUCN 3.1)

Scientific classification
- Kingdom: Animalia
- Phylum: Arthropoda
- Clade: Pancrustacea
- Class: Insecta
- Order: Odonata
- Infraorder: Anisoptera
- Family: Libellulidae
- Genus: Diplacodes
- Species: D. bipunctata

Binomial name
- Diplacodes bipunctata (Brauer, 1865)

Synonyms
- Libellula (Diplax) bipunctata Brauer, 1865; Diplax pacificus Kirby, 1884; Sympetrum novaezealandiae McLachlan, 1894

= Diplacodes bipunctata =

Wandering percher

Species of dragonfly

Diplacodes bipunctata (Māori: tiemiemi) is a species of dragonfly in the family Libellulidae, known as the wandering percher or red percher dragonfly.

== Description ==
Diplacodes bipunctata is a small to medium-sized dragonfly with a wingspan of about 55 millimeters. The wings are colorless except for a yellowish spot at the base of the hindwing. The male has a bright orange or red abdomen with dark markings along the dorsal line and sides, and the female is yellowish with similar markings. There are two dark spots at the side of the synthorax, one of which is the metastigma.

== Range ==
Diplacodes bipunctata is a widespread species occurring in New Zealand and in a number of islands in the south-Pacific. In New Zealand it is most common in Northland, but occasional specimens have been found as south as Fiordland. In Australia it is found throughout the continent except in Tasmania. It is found near a wide variety of freshwater pools, streams and swamps.

== Biology ==
This species is an early colonizer of appropriate habitat types in freshwater and brackish waters.

== Etymology ==
The genus name Diplacodes combines Diplax, a genus name derived from the Greek δίς (dis, "twice") and πλάξ (plax, "flat and broad"), with the Greek suffix –ώδης (-ōdēs, "resembling" or "having the nature of"). The name refers to the similarity of the genus to Diplax and Diplacina.

The species name bipunctata is derived from the Latin bi- ("two") and punctum ("point" or "spot"), referring to the two black spots on the side of the thorax.

== Gallery ==
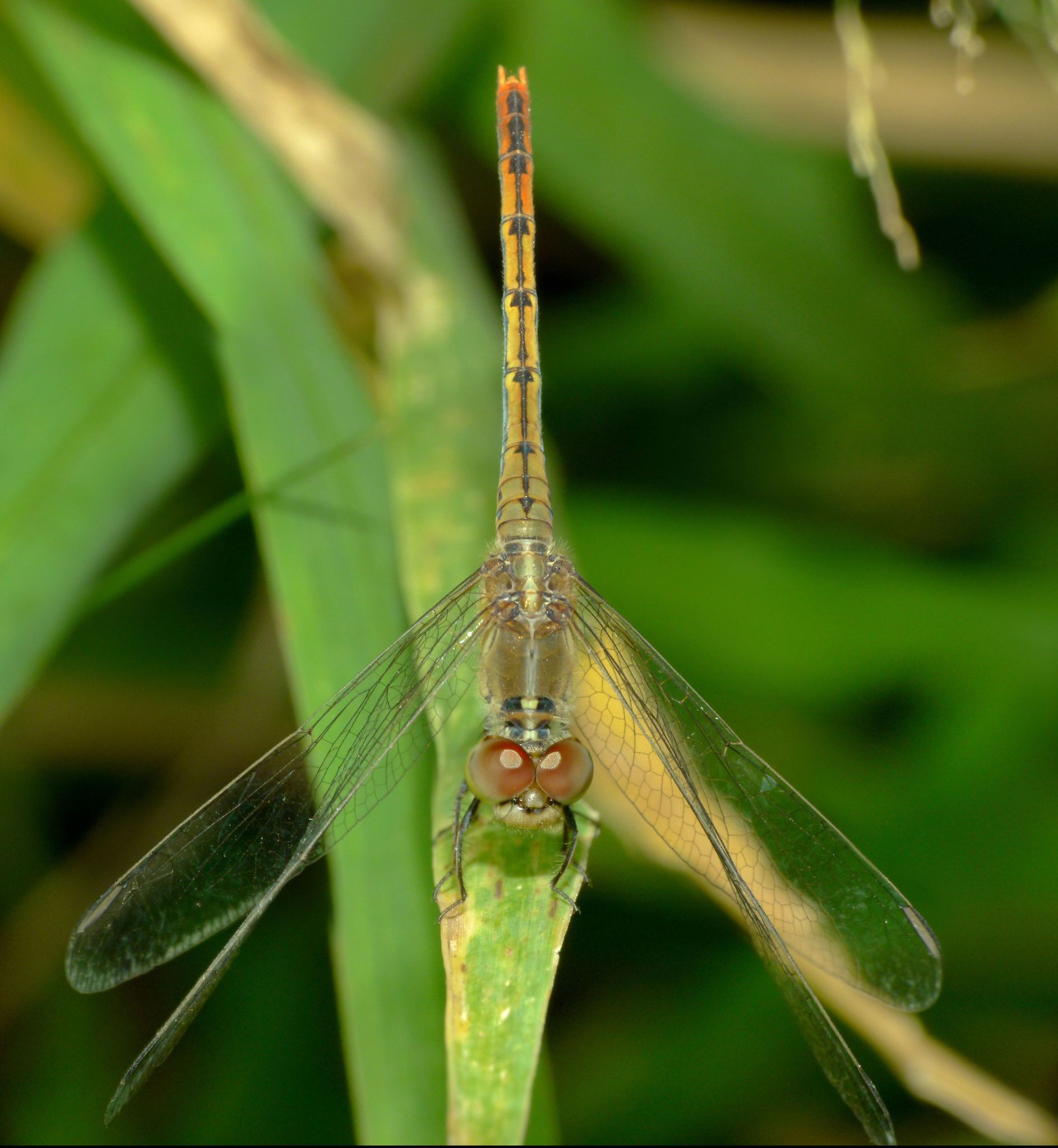
Female

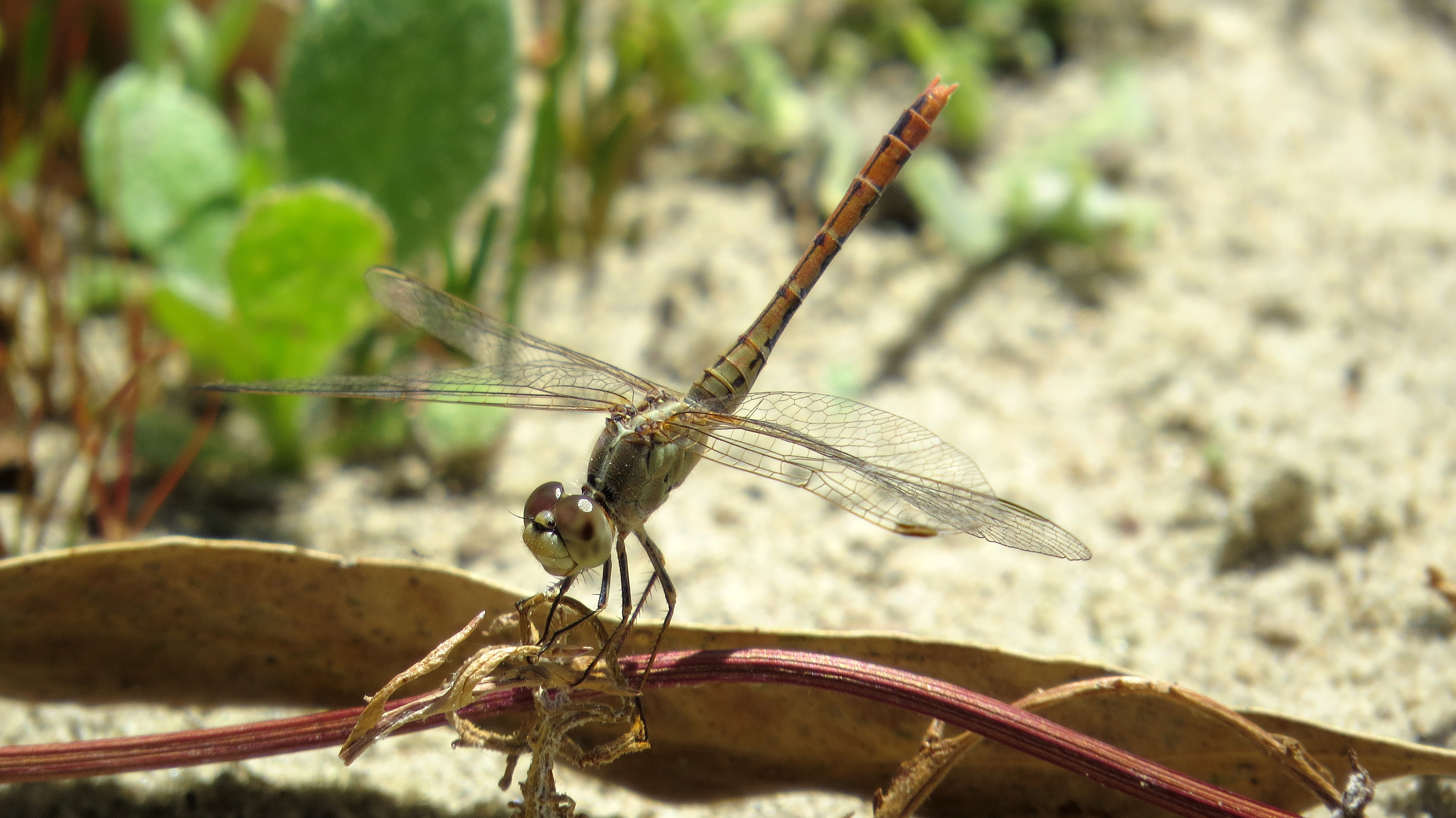
Female

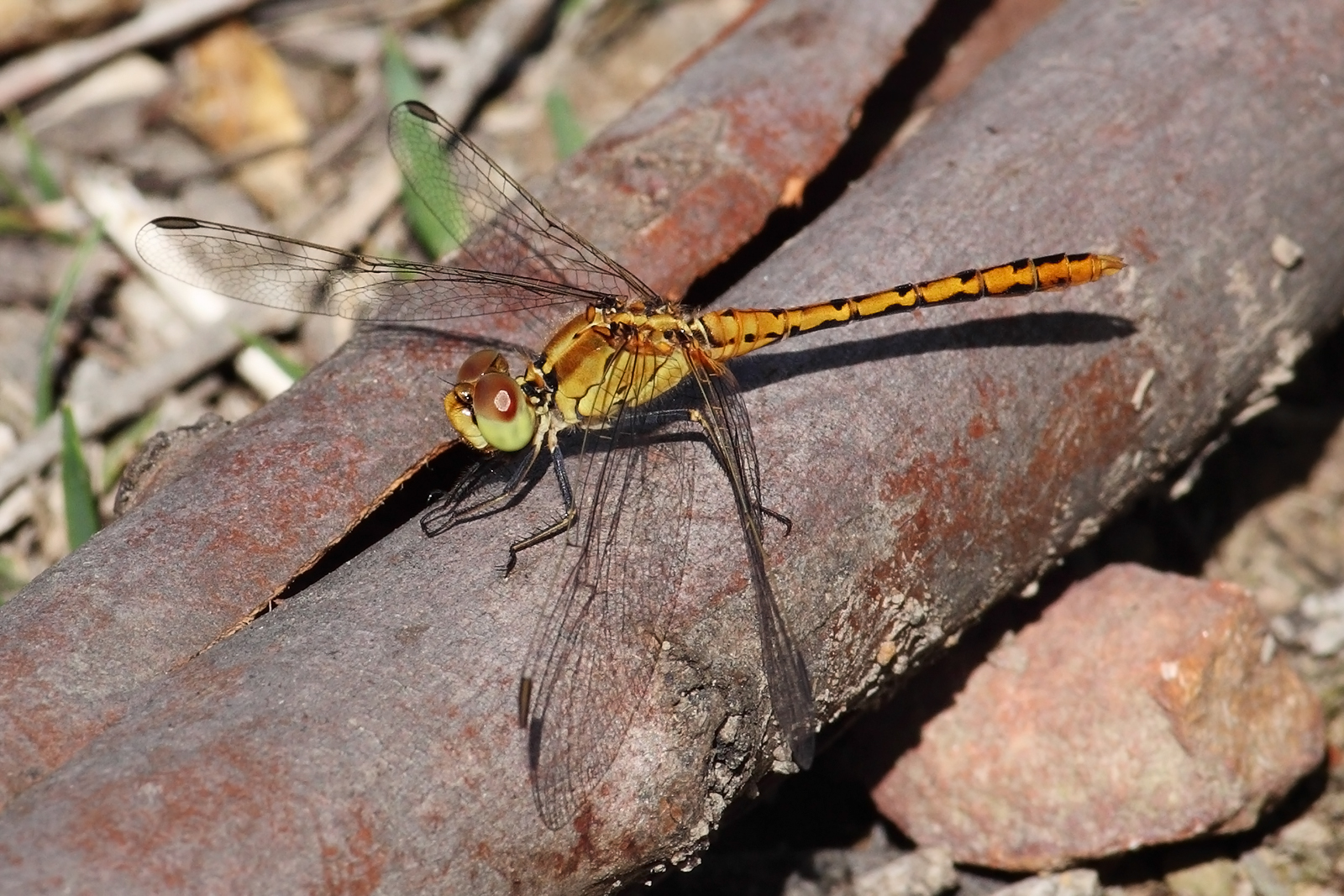
Immature male

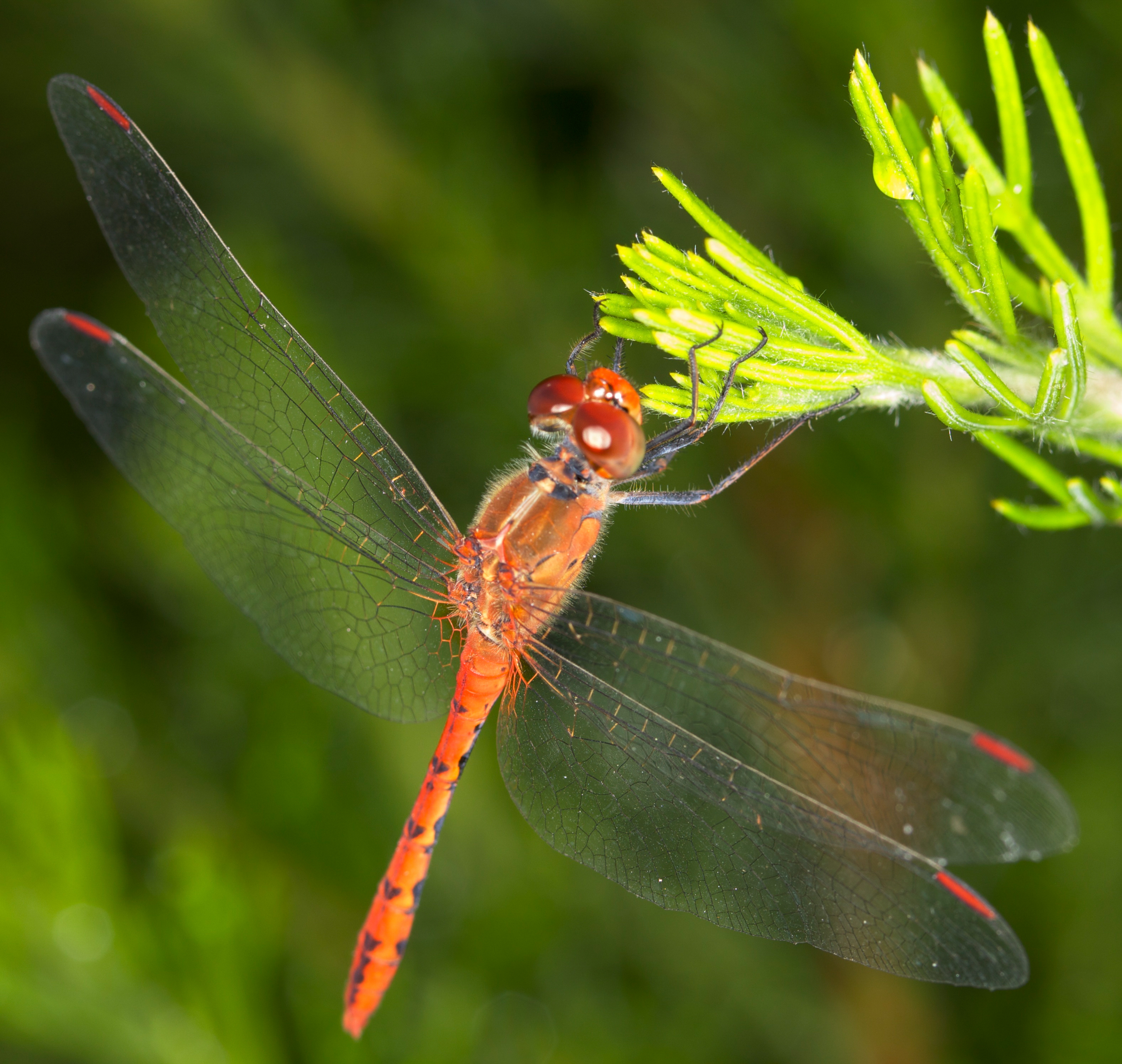
Male

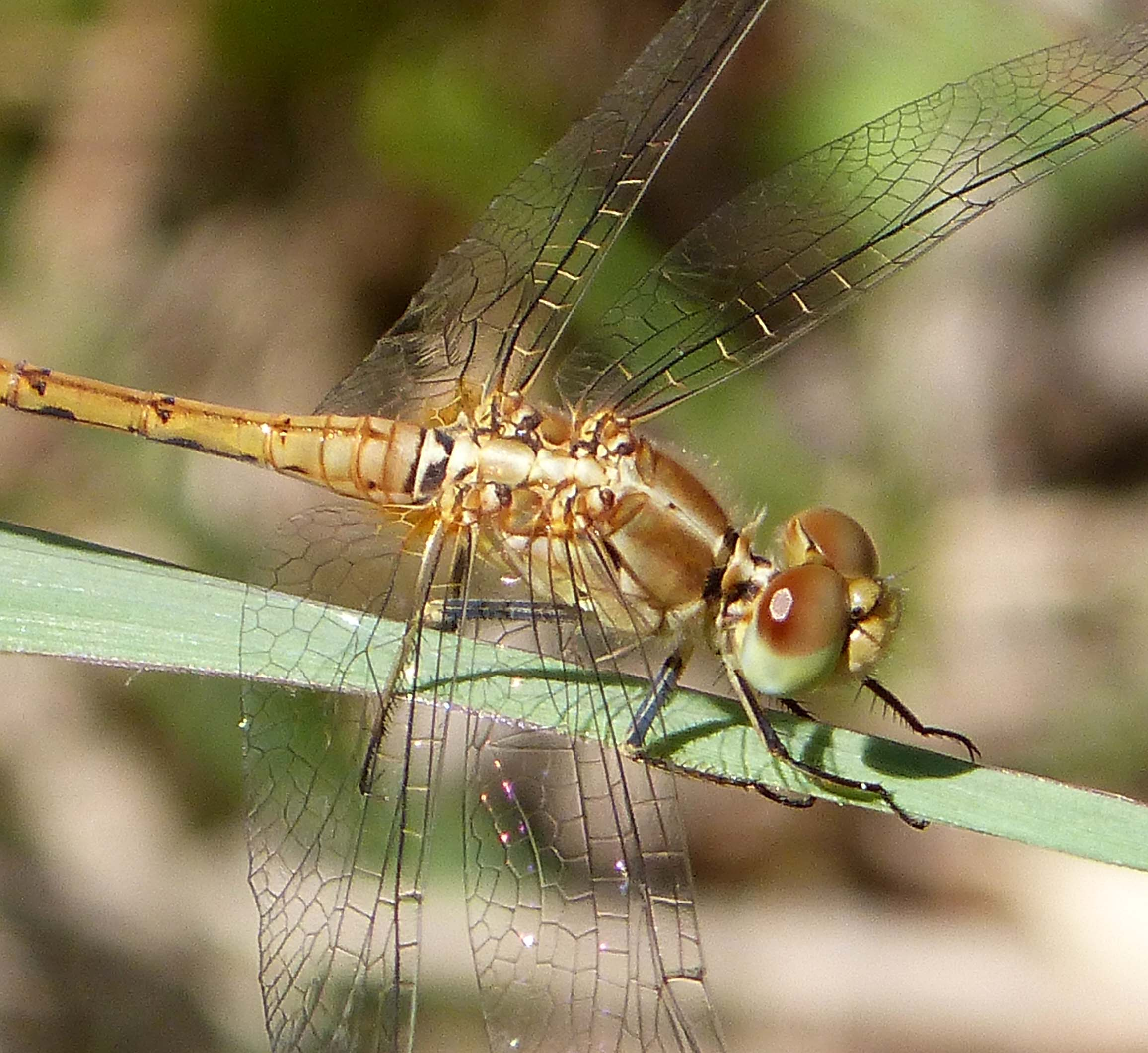
Immature male

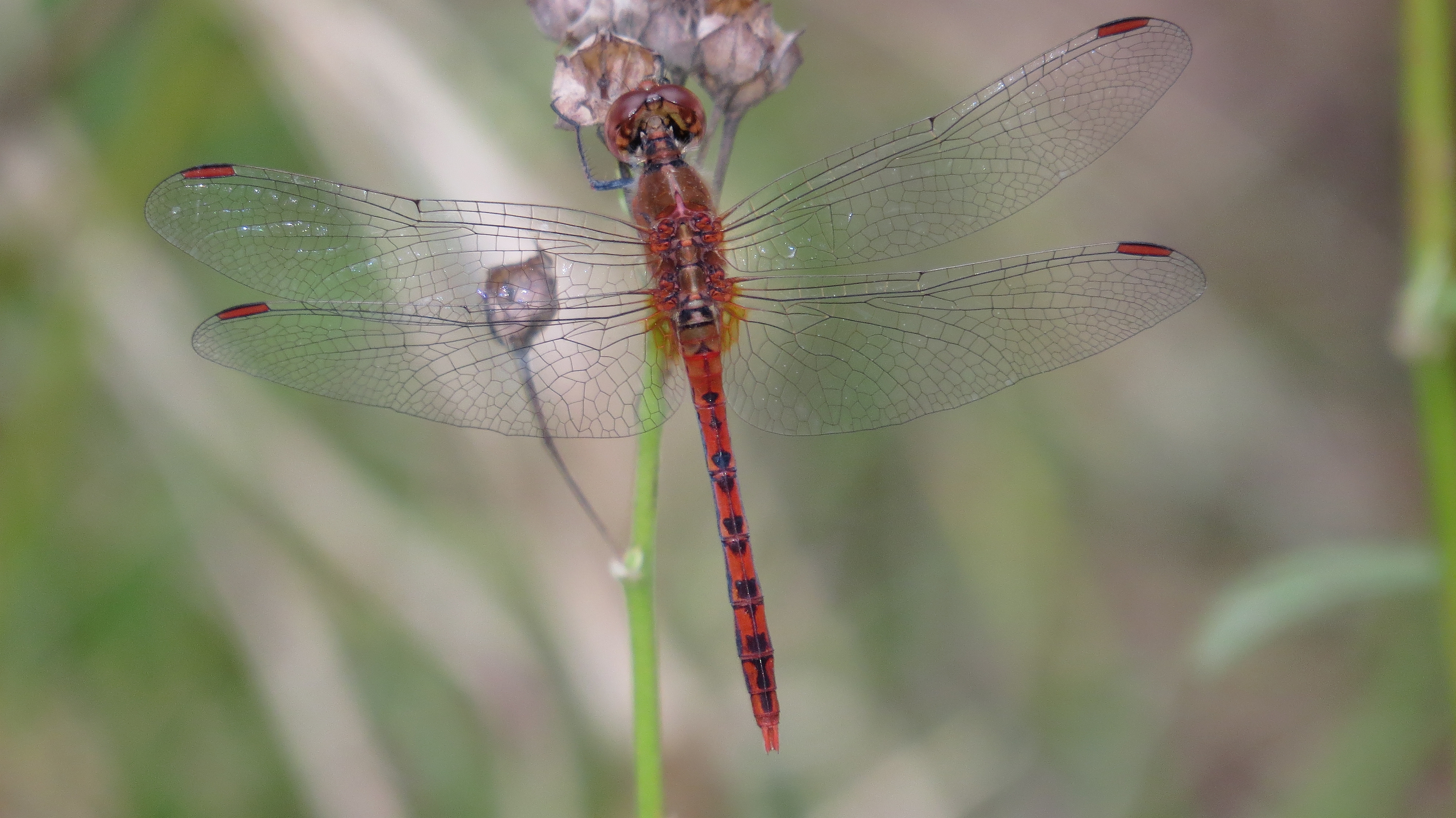
Male with outspread wings

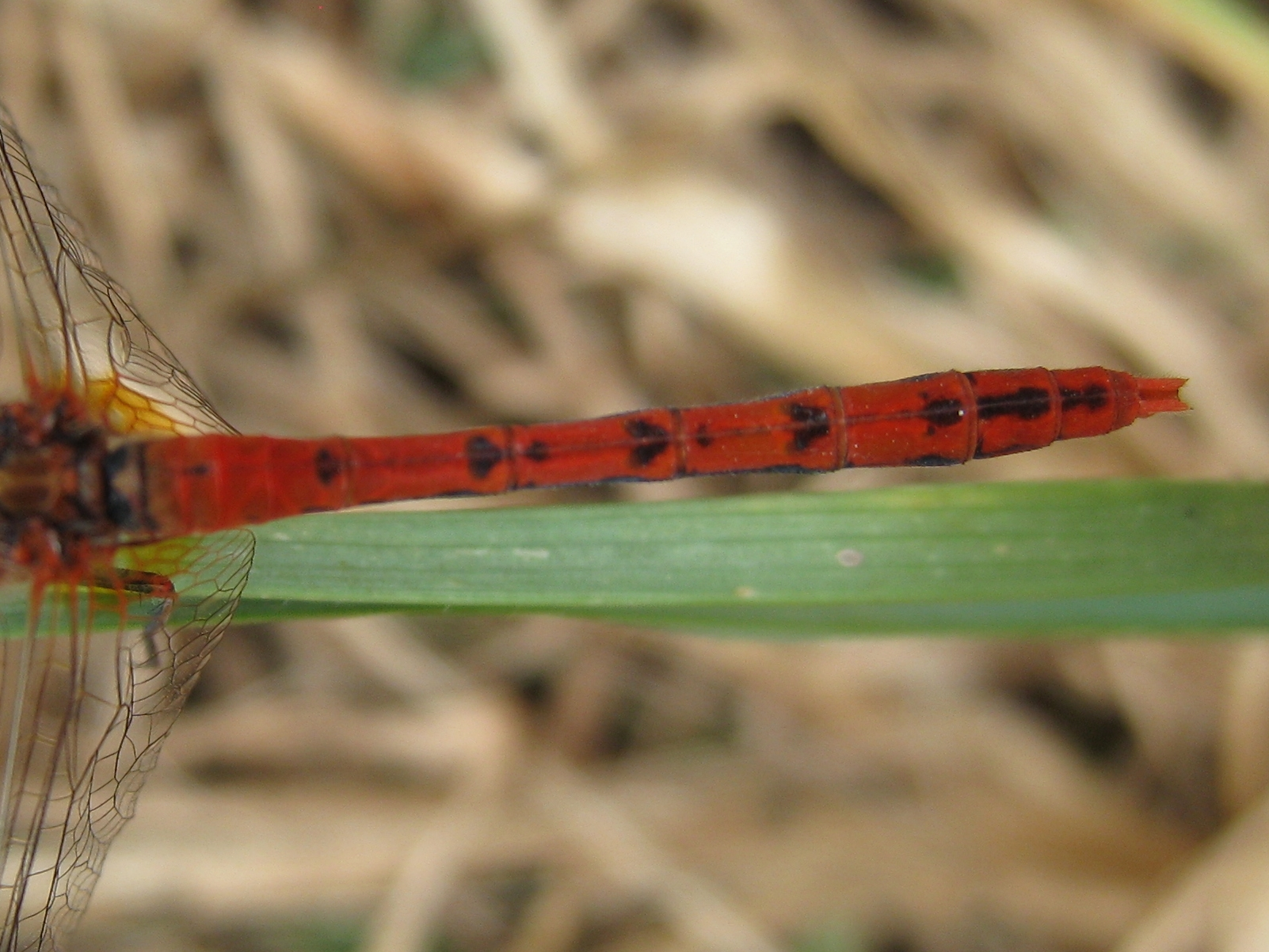
Male tail

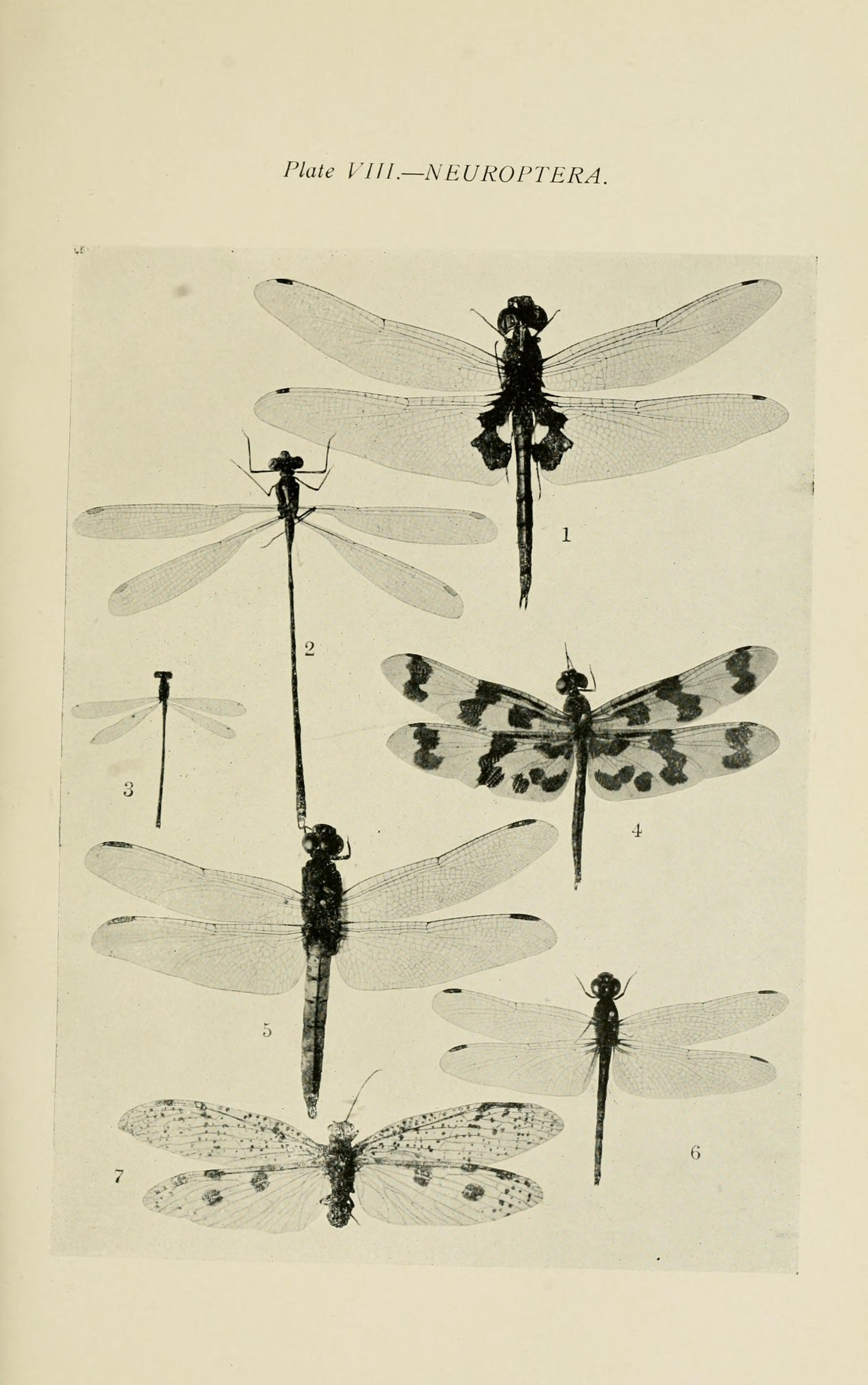
6. Diplacodes bipunctata from Australian Insects 1907, by W.W. Froggatt

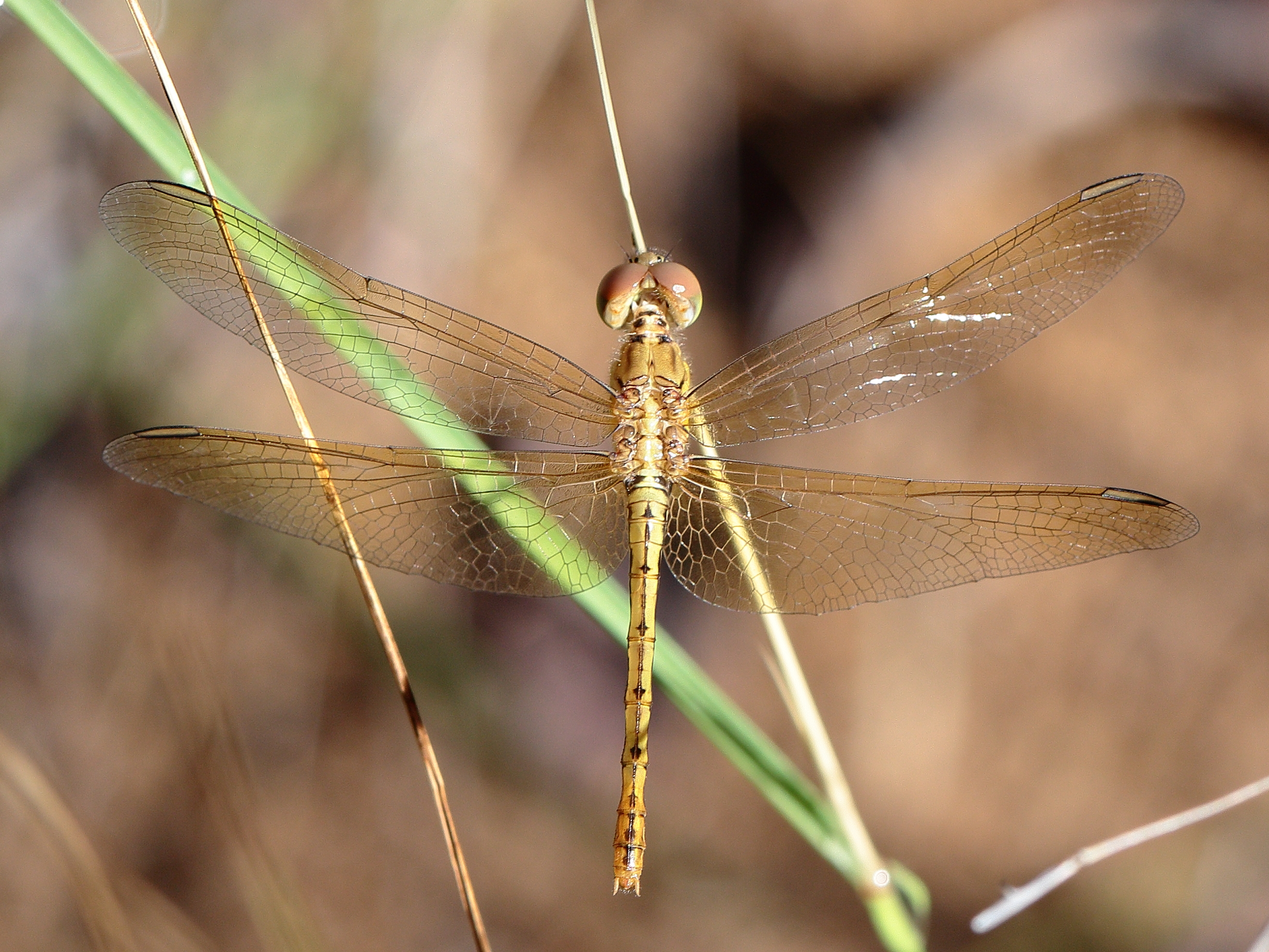
Adult female from above

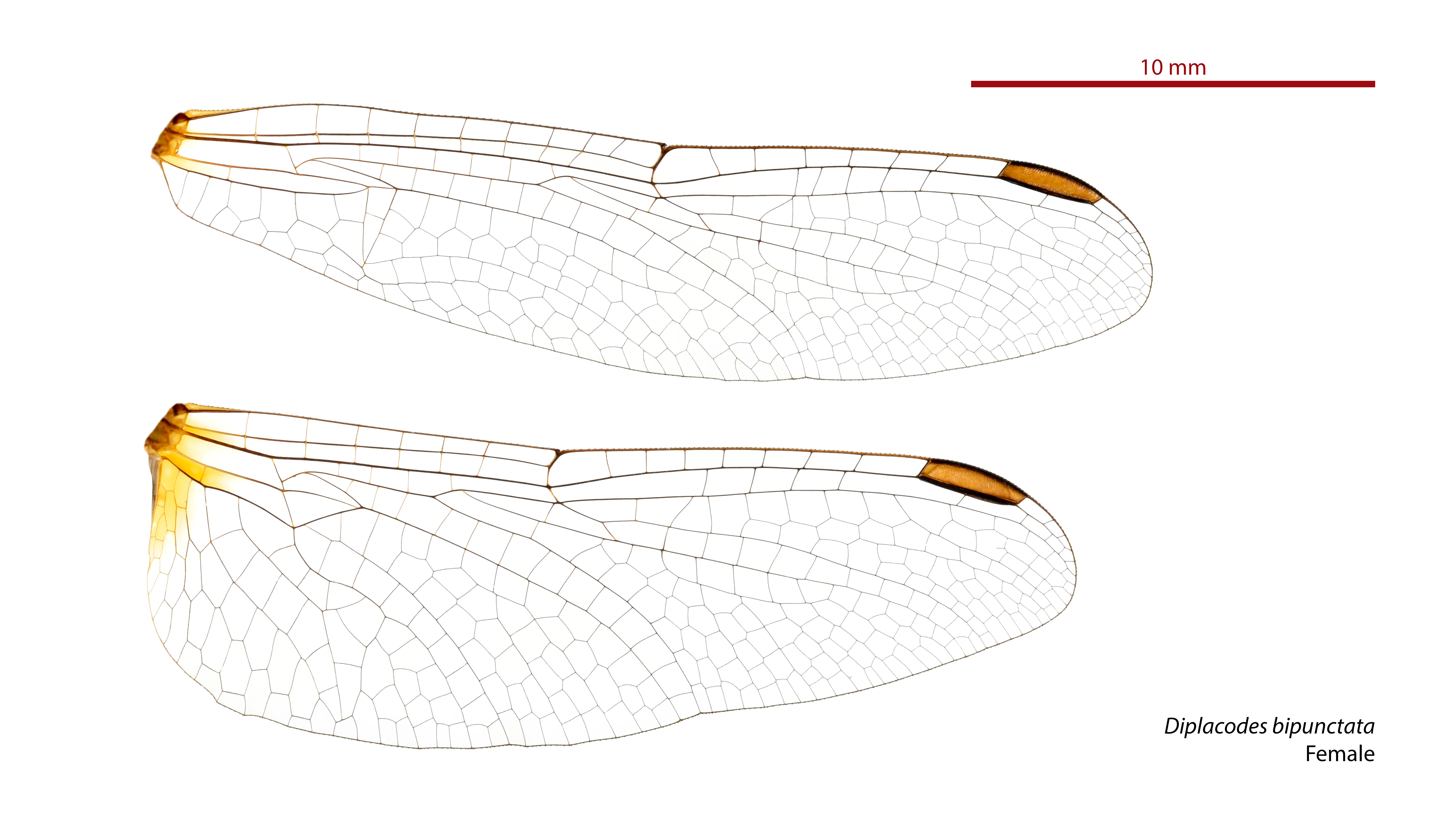
Female wings

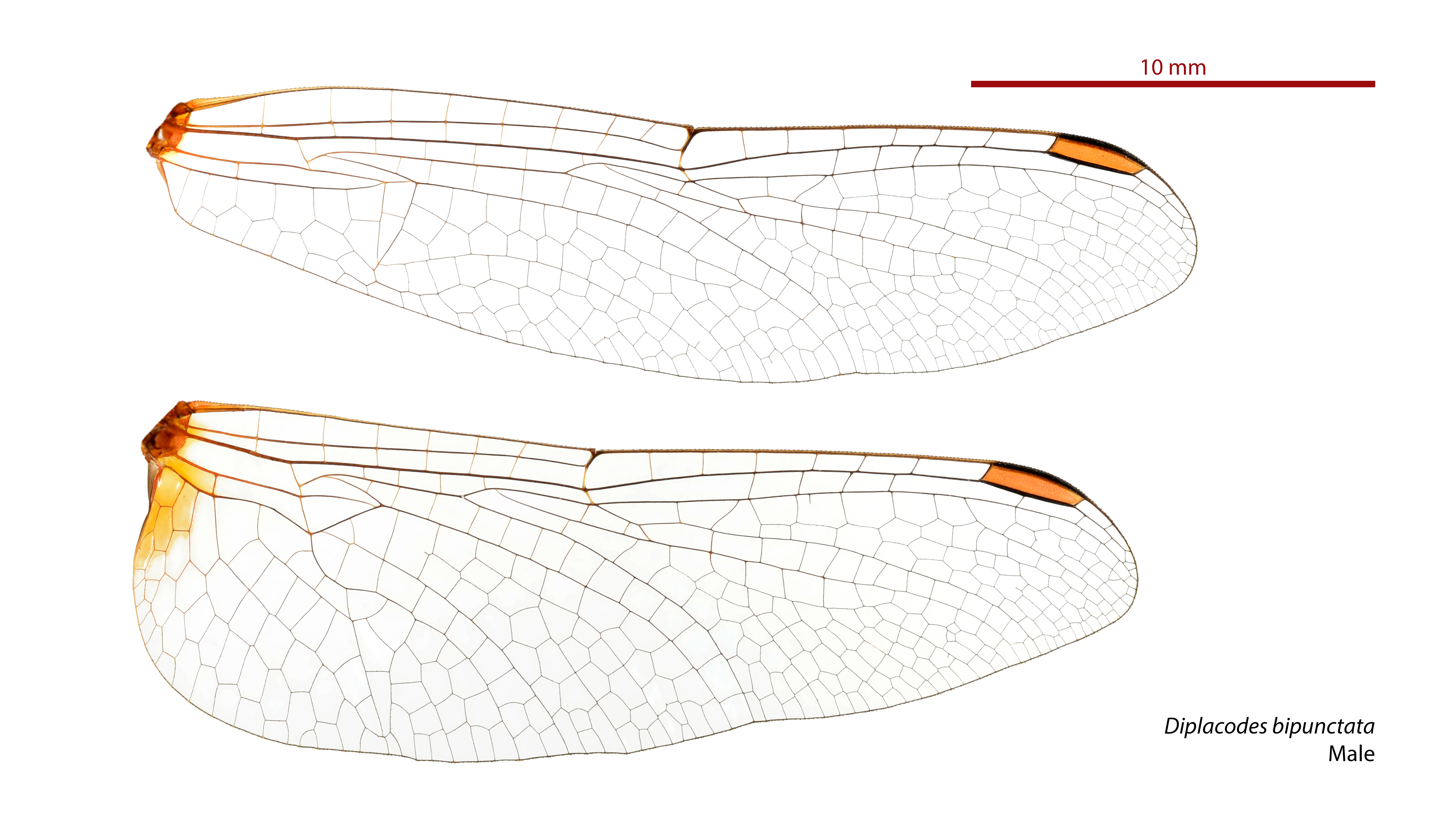
Male wings
