= Freshwater Bay =

Freshwater Bay can refer to:

- Freshwater Bay (Western Australia)
- Freshwater Bay, Barbados
- Freshwater Bay, Newfoundland, bay near Gambo, Newfoundland and Labrador, Canada
- Freshwater Bay, Isle of Wight, village on the south coast of the Isle of Wight, England
- Freshwater Bay, Portland, bay on the Isle of Portland, Dorset, England
- Freshwater Bay (Alaska), US
- Freshwater Bay (Washington), US
