= Freshwater, California =

Unincorporated community in California, United States

Freshwater
- Unincorporated community
- Location in California Freshwater (the United States)
- Coordinates: 40°45′41″N 124°03′42″W
- Country: United States
- State: California
- County: Humboldt
- Elevation: 92 ft (28 m)

Freshwater (formerly, Wrangletown, Garfield, Lambertville, and Hardscrabble) is an unincorporated community in Humboldt County, California, United States. It is located on Freshwater Creek, a major tributary to Humboldt Bay (and the previous source of municipal water to the City of Eureka, California), 7.5 miles (12 km) south of Arcata, at an elevation of 92 feet (28 m). The area is the site of a now logged massive old-growth redwood forest and prevalent remaining second-growth forest. The trees in the area are storied to have been some of the largest coast redwoods to have ever existed. On September 24, 1964, the large area and all its residents became part of unincorporated Eureka, within the 95503 zipcode. Freshwater Park, a Humboldt County Park, which has picnic areas and a swimming area each summer, is located nearby on Freshwater Creek.

== Education ==
Freshwater is the site of the Freshwater Elementary School District, and home of the Freshwater School, a public K-6 school, and Freshwater Charter Middle School for seventh and eighth grade students. The original school was a one-room schoolhouse. In the 1920s, a two-room brick and mortar school was built. A new school was built in 1952 and has been renovated and expanded several times since.

The actual original town site of Freshwater is the site of Garfield Elementary School District, which operates a small K-6 public school.

Both school districts in the area known as "Freshwater" are also within the Eureka Unified High School District, and students usually attend Eureka High School following successful completion of primary education.
