= Wabana, Newfoundland and Labrador =

Wabana
- Town
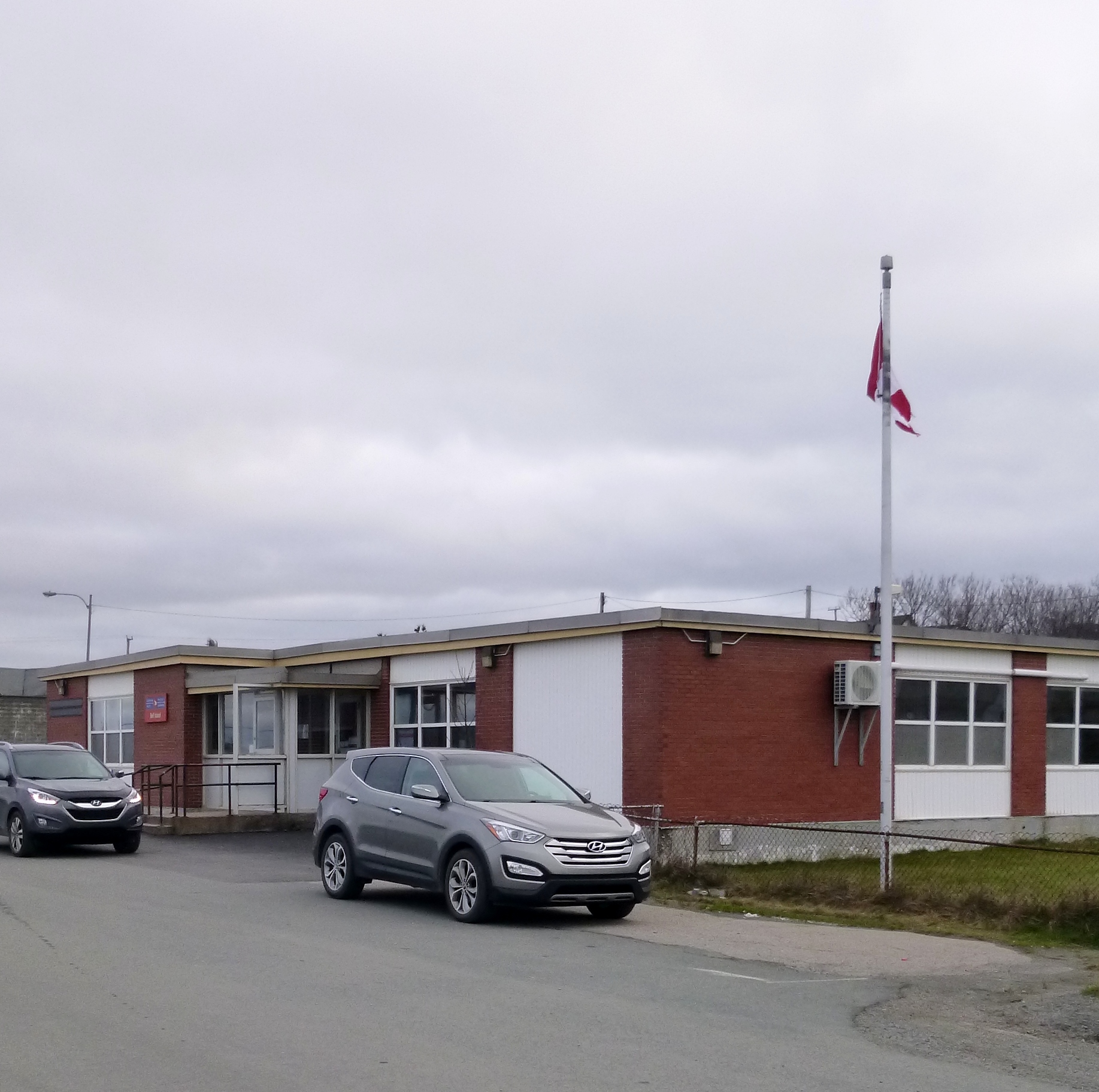
- Post office in Wabana

- Location of Wabana in Newfoundland
- Coordinates: 47°39′N 52°56′W
- Country: Canada
- Province: Newfoundland and Labrador
- Incorporated: 1950

Government
  - Mayor: Philip Tobin
  - MHA: Fred Hutton (LIB)

Population (2021)
  - Total: 1,815
- Time zone: UTC-3:30 (Newfoundland Time)
  - Summer (DST): UTC-2:30 (Newfoundland Daylight)
- Area code: 709
- Highways: Car Ferry to Portugal Cove–St. Philip's

Wabana is a Canadian town and the largest, and only incorporated, community on Bell Island in the province of Newfoundland and Labrador.

== Geography ==
The town is situated on the northeast end of the island and was incorporated in 1950. Bell Island's soil contains red hematite (or iron ore); this resource was the main reason for Wabana's development. In addition to Wabana centre, the municipality consists of three more neighbourhoods, namely West Mines to the west, The Green to the north and The Front (or Bell Island Front) to the southeast, near the ferry terminal.

== Economy ==
Wabana came to prominence during the 1890s when the Butler family from Port de Grave staked mining claims on the north side of the island. These were sold to the Nova Scotia Steel Company and later sold to the Dominion Steel Corporation in the early 1900s. The first mine opened in 1896 and the site of the mines was named Wabana by Thomas Cantly, an official with Nova Scotia Steel Co. – the name being Abenaki for "place where the light shines first."

The mines saw Wabana's population swell to 14,000 within a few years, the second largest community in the Dominion of Newfoundland. A hundred and one workers lost their lives over the course of Bell Island's iron ore industry.

A further 65 sailors on merchant ships were lost on two separate attacks by German U-boats in the fall of 1942; further, four cargo ships for carrying iron ore to the steel mill at Sydney, Nova Scotia sunk.

Wabana's population declined following World War II as the underground mines began to face shortfalls in production, being forced to compete with more efficient open pit mines in Labrador and Minnesota. The parent company, Dominion Steel and Coal Corporation (DOSCO), had been in operation since 1930 and was taken over by other conglomerates in the late 1950s. The steel mill and coal mines in Nova Scotia were facing uncertain futures and their shut down was announced in 1965 (although they were subsequently nationalized).

The expected announcement of the shut down of the iron ore mines in Wabana came on April 19, 1966. Following their closure, the mines were left to flood and the population of Wabana has since steadily declined.

Today, the working population mostly commutes to St. John's on a daily basis, while in the summer a tour of one of the decommissioned mines draws tourism to the island. The island is served by the provincial government ferry system, via the MV Flanders and MV Legionnaire.

Wabana houses the island's post office, a supermarket, a small hospital, two schools, three churches, and several convenience stores. Bell Island's only gas station is located in Wabana.

== Demographics ==
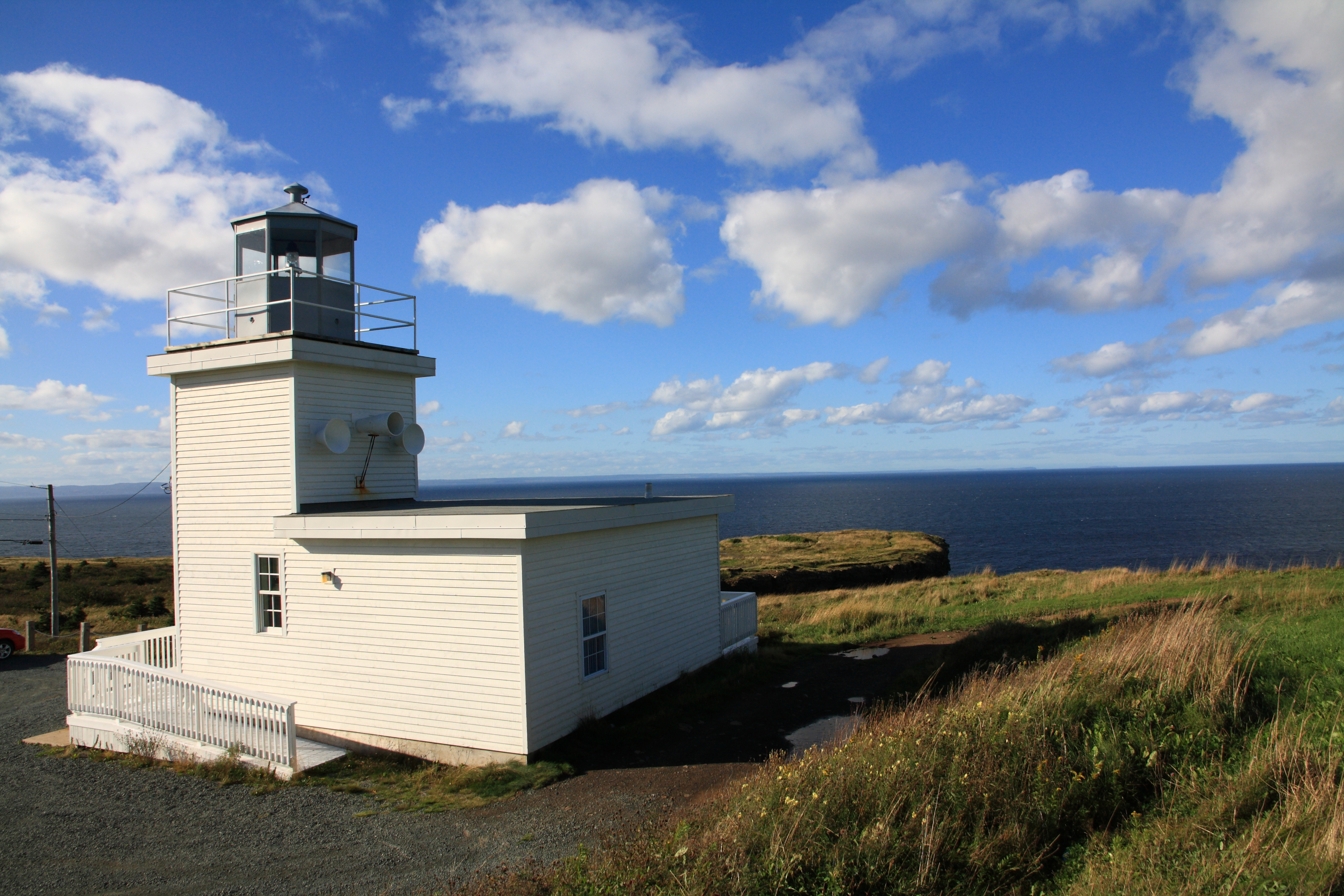
Bell Island Lighthouse

In the 2021 Census of Population conducted by Statistics Canada, Wabana had a population of 1,815 living in 951 of its 1,181 total private dwellings, a change of −15.4% from its 2016 population of 2,146. With a land area of 14.49 km^{2} (5.59 sq mi), it had a population density of 125.3/km^{2} (324.4/sq mi) in 2021.

Historical Populations
Year	Pop.	±%
1951	6,460	—
1961	8,026	+24.2%
1966	7,884	−1.8%
1991	3,608	−54.2%
1996	3,136	−13.1%
2001	2,679	−14.6%
2006	2,418	−9.7%
2011	2,346	−3.0%
2016	2,146	−8.5%
2021	1,815	−15.4%

== Notable people ==
- Allan Hawco, writer, actor, and producer
- David Brazil, politician, former MHA
- David Jackman, politician, former MHA
- Harry Hibbs, musician
